= 2000 United States House of Representatives elections in Florida =

United States House of Representatives elections in Florida, 2000
- November 7, 2000

All 23 Florida seats to the United States House of Representatives
	Majority party	Minority party
Party	Republican	Democratic
Last election	15	8
Seats won	15	8
Seat change	Steady	Steady
Popular vote	2,130,626	1,976,189
Percentage	47.62%	44.17%
Republican
50–60%
60–70%
70–80%
80–90%
90>%
Democratic
50–60%
60–70%
70–80%
80–90%
90>%

The 2000 congressional elections in Florida were held on November 7, 2000, to determine who would represent the state of Florida in the United States House of Representatives. Representatives are elected for two-year terms; those elected served in the 107th Congress from January 3, 2001, until January 3, 2003. The election coincided with the 2000 United States presidential election.

At the time, Florida had twenty-three seats in the House, apportioned according to the 1990 United States census. Its delegation to the 106th Congress of 1999-2001 consisted of fifteen Republicans and eight Democrats. No seats switched parties in 2000, though the incumbents in Districts 4, 8, and 12 retired. Thus, Florida's delegation to the 107th Congress consisted of fifteen Republicans and eight Democrats. The election for 8th and 22nd districts were competitive, with both decided by a margin of less than 2%. The latter district, which was based in the Miami area, underwent a recount in the midst of a controversial recount of votes for the presidential election.

The Primary election was held September 5, 2000, while the general election was held November 7, 2000. Florida did not have early voting until 2004, in response to the presidential election in 2000.

== Overview ==
The table below shows the total number and percentage of votes, as well as the number of seats gained and lost by each political party in the election for the United States House of Representatives in Florida. All vote totals come from the Florida Secretary of State's website along with the individual counties' election department websites.

United States House of Representatives elections in Florida, 2000
Party	Votes	Percentage	Seats	+/–
Republican	2,130,626	47.62%	15	0
Democratic	1,976,189	44.17%	8	0
Others	183,460	4.10%	0	0
Totals	4,473,735	100.00%	23	—
Voter turnout	70.1%			

== District 1 ==
2000 Florida's 1st congressional district election
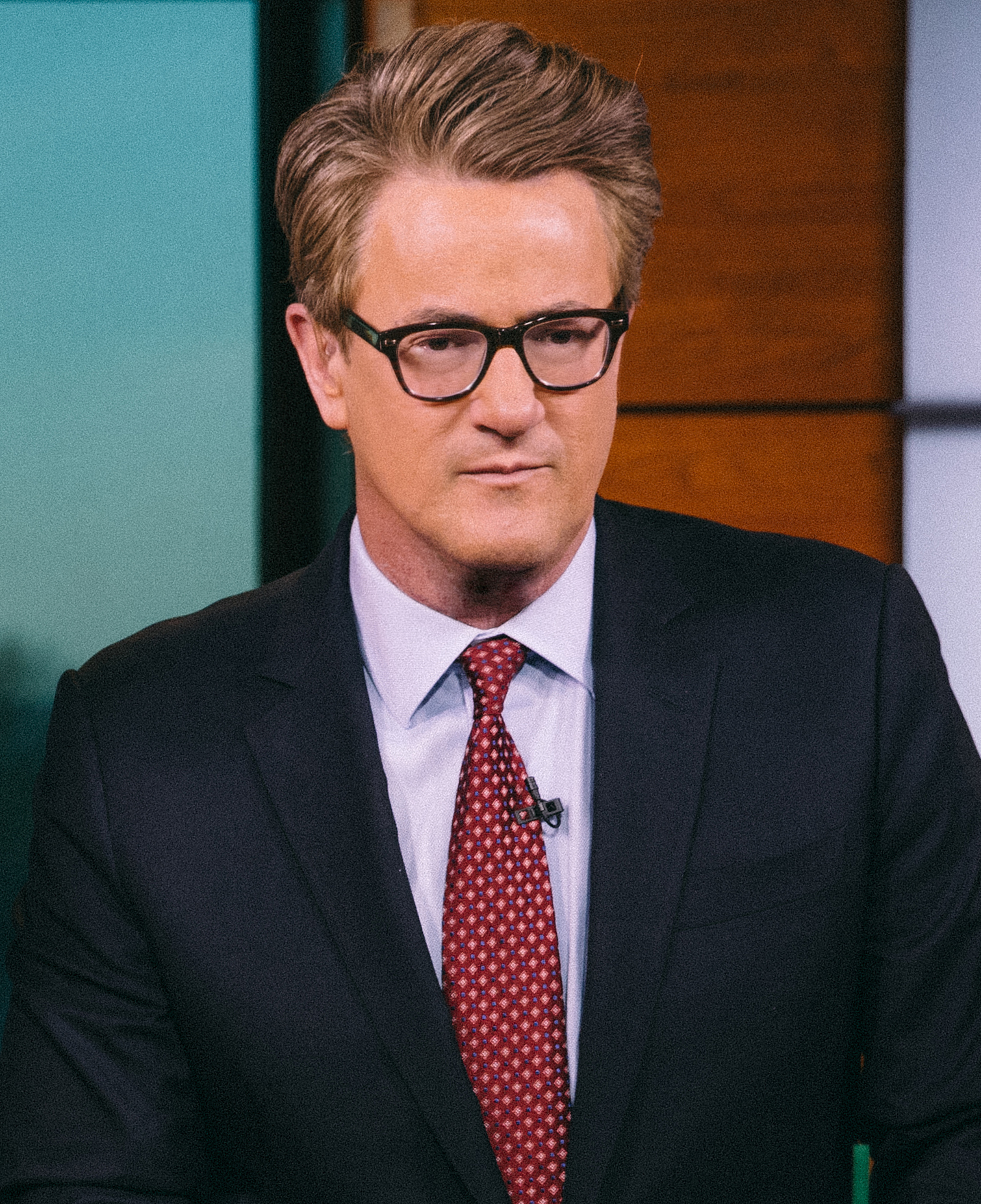
Nominee	Joe Scarborough
Party	Republican
Popular vote	226,473
Percentage	100.0%
U.S. Representative before election
Joe Scarborough
Republican
Elected U.S. Representative
Joe Scarborough
Republican

Republican Joe Scarborough was first elected in 1994 and decided to seek a fourth term in 2000. During the primary, Scarborough was challenged by Pensacola attorney David Condon. As expected, Scarborough prevailed over Condon, winning by a margin of 77.4%-22.6%. This was the only seat tantamount to the election in Florida, because the winner of the Republican primary would face no Democratic opposition. In the general election on November 7, 2000, Scarborough received only token opposition from four write-in candidates - Dave Blue, Mark Coutu, Fred Hoole, and Dudley Wiley. Scraborough won the election with 99.5% of the vote. Primary election results

Republican primary results
Party	Candidate	Votes	%
Republican	Joe Scarborough	54,032	77.4
Republican	David Condon	15,808	22.6
Total votes		69,840	100

General election results

Florida 1st Congressional District 2000
Party	Candidate	Votes	%
Republican	Joe Scarborough	226,473	99.95
Write-In	Mark S. Coutu	376	0.02
Write-In	Fred Hoole	311	0.01
Write-In	Dudley Wiley	192	0.01
Write-In	Dave Blue	187	0.74
Total votes		227,539	100.0
Turnout			
Republican hold			

== District 2 ==
2000 Florida's 2nd congressional district election
- November 7, 2000
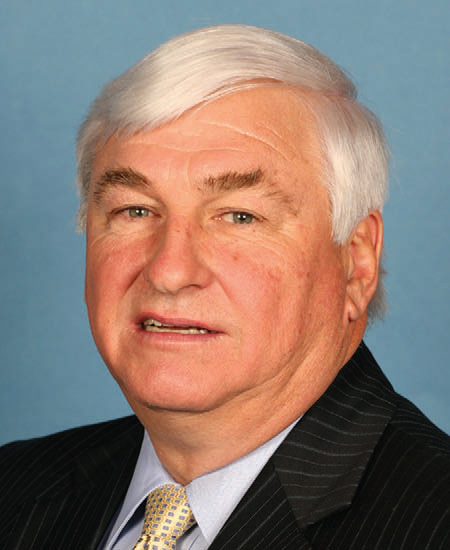

Nominee	Allen Boyd	Doug Dodd
Party	Democratic	Republican
Popular vote	185,579	71,754
Percentage	72.1%	27.9%
- County results Boyd: 60–70% 70–80% 80–90%
U.S. Representative before election
Allen Boyd
Democratic
Elected U.S. Representative
Allen Boyd
Democratic

Incumbent Allen Boyd, who had been in office since 1997, sought a third term during this election cycle. He faced no challenges for the Democratic nomination. Likewise, Republican Doug Dodd received no opposition in his respective primary. Thomas A. Frederick also entered the race as a write-in candidate. Boyd prevailed in this then-left leaning district, winning with 72.1% of the vote. General election results

Florida 2nd Congressional District 2000
Party	Candidate	Votes	%
Democratic	Allen Boyd	185,579	72.1
Republican	Doug Dodd	71,754	27.9
Write-In	Thomas A. Frederick	70	0.0
Total votes		257,403	100.0
Turnout			
Democratic hold			

== District 3 ==
2000 Florida's 3rd congressional district election
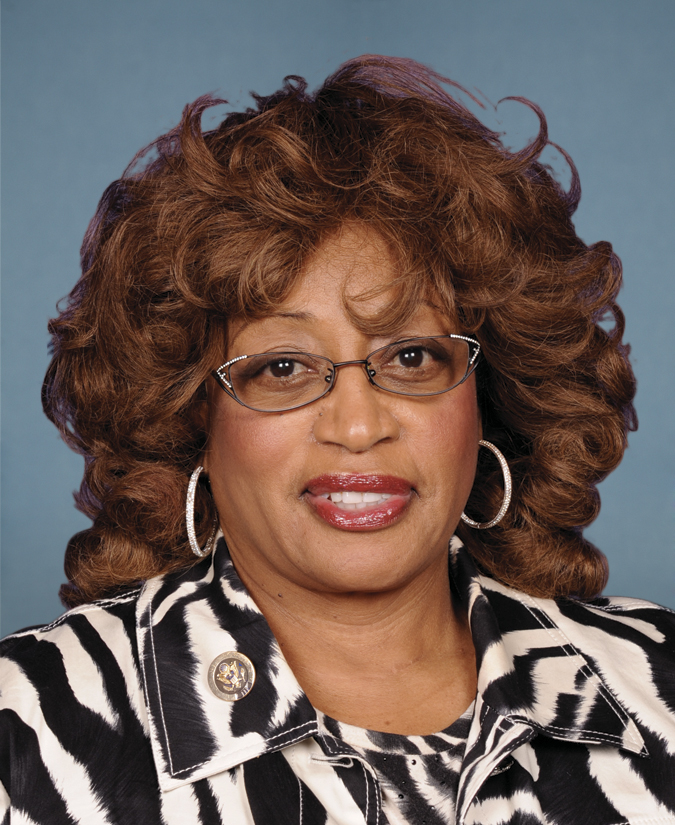

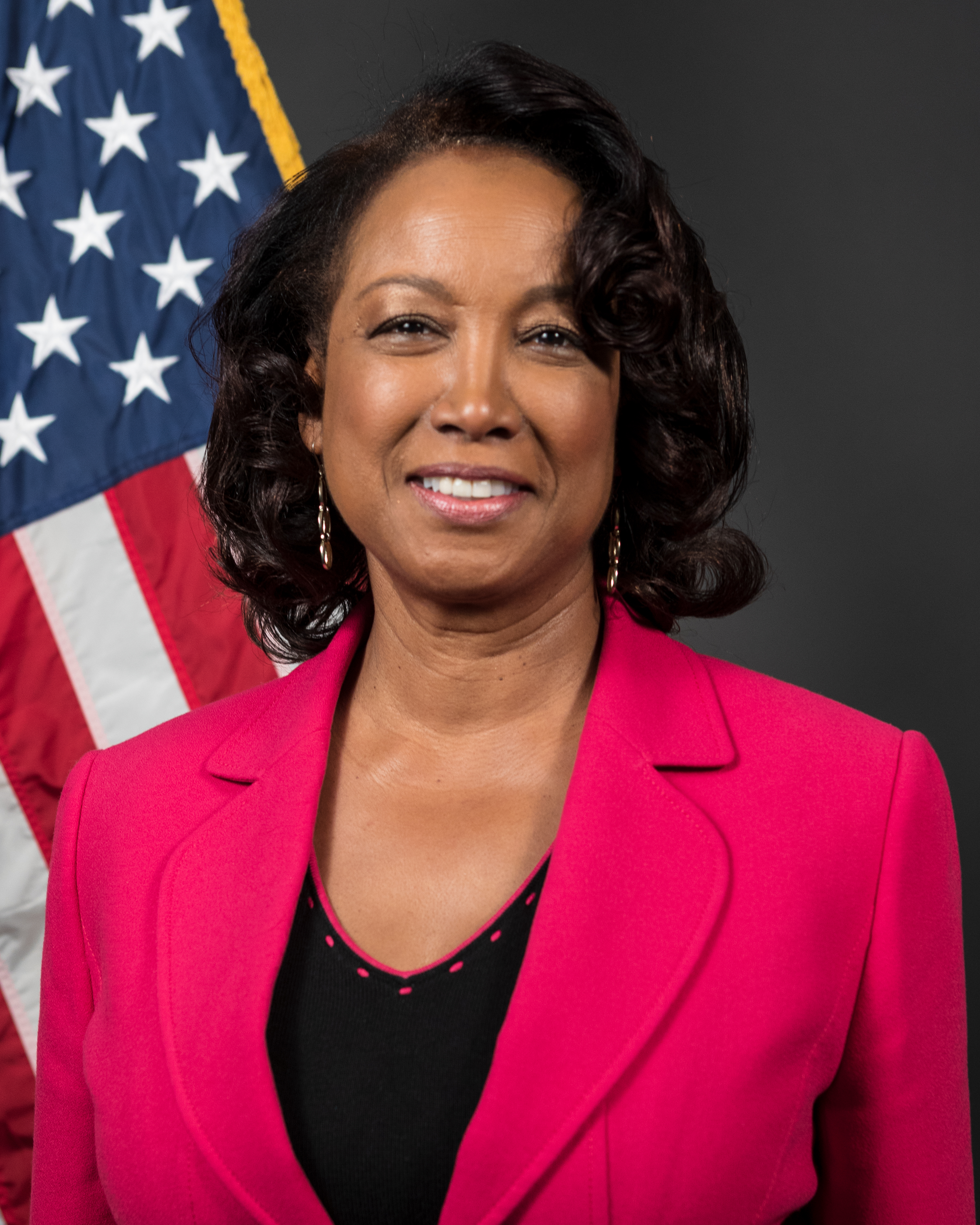
Nominee	Corrine Brown	Jennifer Carroll
Party	Democratic	Republican
Popular vote	102,143	75,228
Percentage	57.6%	42.4%
- County results Carroll: 50–60% 60–70% 70–80% Brown: 50–60% 60–70% 70–80%
U.S. Representative before election
Corrine Brown
Democratic
Elected U.S. Representative
Corrine Brown
Democratic

As in District 2, neither incumbent Corrine Brown (D) or Jennifer Carroll (R) faced opposition in their respective primaries. Write-in candidate Carl Sumner also entered the race. On election day, Brown defeated future-Lieutenant Governor Carroll and Sumner by comfortable margin, receiving 57.6% of the vote in this left-leaning district. General election results

Florida 3rd Congressional District 2000
Party	Candidate	Votes	%
Democratic	Corrine Brown	102,143	57.6
Republican	Jennifer Carroll	75,228	42.4
Write-In	Carl Sumner	1	0.0
Total votes		177,372	100.0
Turnout			
Democratic hold			

== District 4 ==
2000 Florida's 4th congressional district election
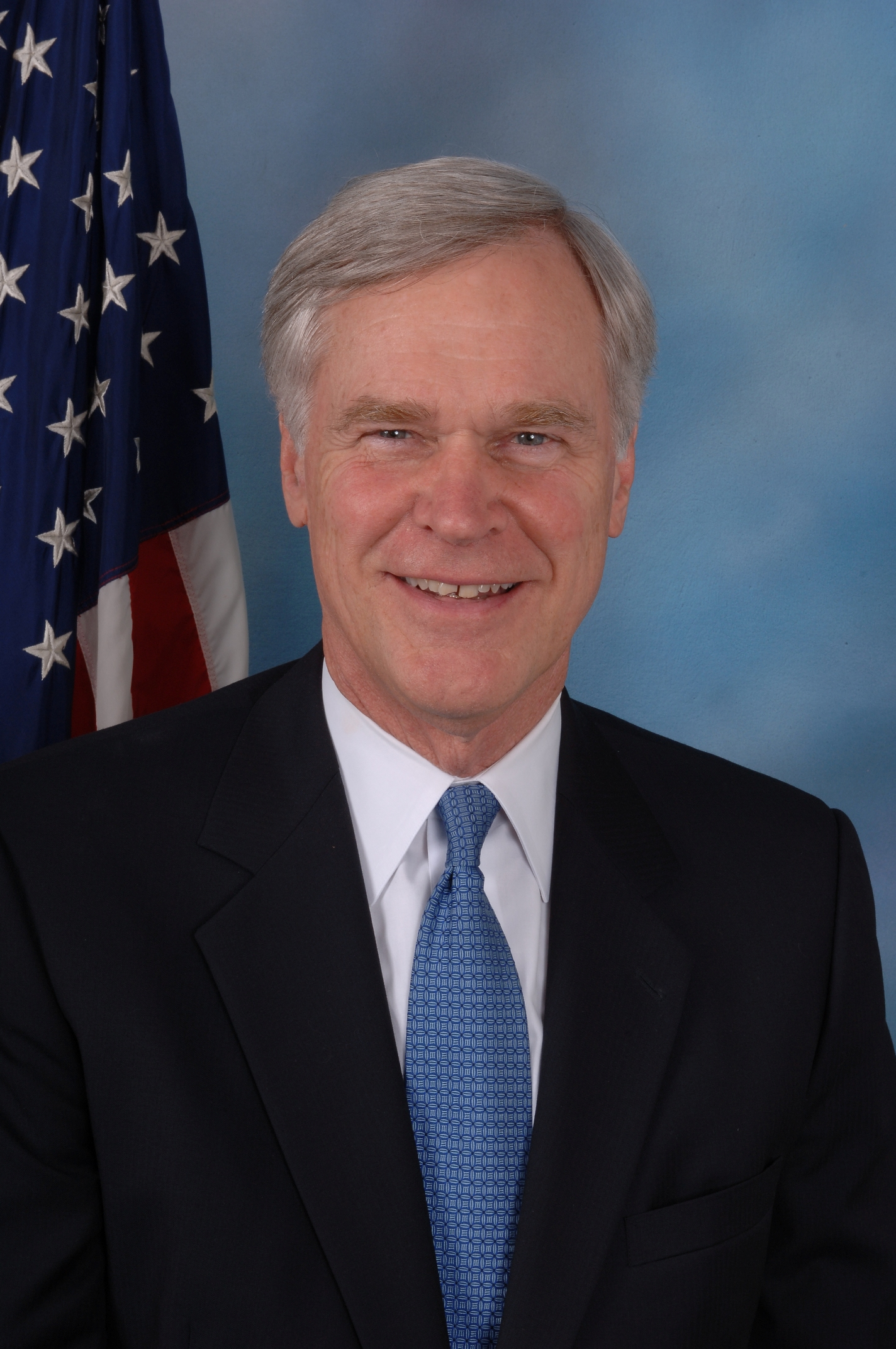

Nominee	Ander Crenshaw	Tom Sullivan
Party	Republican	Democratic
Popular vote	203,090	94,587
Percentage	67.0%	31.2%
- County results Crenshaw: 50–60% 60–70% 70–80%
U.S. Representative before election
Tillie K. Fowler
Republican
Elected U.S. Representative
Ander Crenshaw
Republican

Incumbent Tillie K. Fowler (R) declined to run for re-election in 2000, leaving an open seat. The two candidates in the Republican primary were CEO and President of America's Choice Title Company Dan Quiggle and Ander Crenshaw, President of the Florida Senate and son-in law of former Governor of Claude R. Kirk, Jr. Crenshaw easily defeated Quiggle and received over two-thirds of the votes. Former Jacksonville mayor Tommy Hazouri, Jacksonville City County President Eric Smith, and former State Representative Mike Langton considered running for the Democratic nomination, but all declined, leaving only Jacksonville lawyer Kevin Sanders and businessman Tom Sullivan. On the day of the primary, Sullivan won, garnering about 62.2% of the vote. In addition, independent Deborah K. Pueschel and write-in candidate Vince W. Ray entered the race. Republican Crenshaw soundly defeated Sullivan, Pueschel, and Ray on election day. Primary election results

Republican primary results
Party	Candidate	Votes	%
Republican	Ander Crenshaw	47,588	69.6
Republican	Dan Quiggle	20,816	30.4
Total votes		68,404	100

Democratic primary results
Party	Candidate	Votes	%
Democratic	Tom Sullivan	29,009	62.2
Democratic	Kevin Sanders	17,652	37.8
Total votes		46,661	100

General election results

Florida 4th Congressional District 2000
Party	Candidate	Votes	%
Republican	Ander Crenshaw	203,090	67.0
Democratic	Tom Sullivan	94,587	31.2
Independent	Deborah K. Pueschel	5,609	1.8
Write-In	Vince W. Gray	0	0.0
Total votes		303,286	100.0
Turnout			
Republican hold			

== District 5 ==
2000 Florida's 5th congressional district election
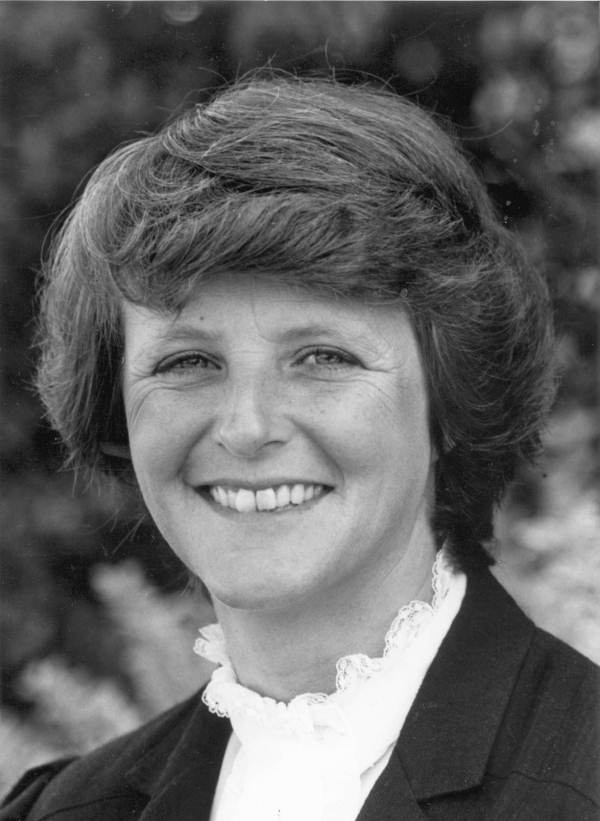

Nominee	Karen Thurman	Pete Enwall
Party	Democratic	Republican
Popular vote	180,338	100,244
Percentage	64.3%	35.7%
- County results Thurman: 50–60% 60–70%
U.S. Representative before election
Karen Thurman
Democratic
Elected U.S. Representative
Karen Thurman
Democratic

Democratic incumbent Karen Thurman ran for a fifth term in 2000. She went unchallenged in the primary for her party's nomination. However, the Republican primary featured a tough contest between Pete Enwall and Jim King, both of whom were businessmen from Gainesville. During the week before the primary, the St. Petersburg Times hosted a candidate forum between Enwall and King. Enwall claimed that King's campaign fliers distorted his views on social issues and accused King of mudslinging. On the day of the primary, Enwall narrowly defeated King, garnering about 51.4% of the vote. Write-in candidate Don Johnson also entered in the general election. Thurman trounced Enwall and Johnson, receiving nearly two-thirds of the vote. Primary election results

Republican primary results
Party	Candidate	Votes	%
Republican	Pete Enwall	19,405	51.4
Republican	Dan Quiggle	18,375	48.6
Total votes		37,780	100

General election results

Florida 5th Congressional District 2000
Party	Candidate	Votes	%
Democratic	Karen Thurman	180,338	64.3
Republican	Pete Enwall	100,244	35.7
Write-In	Don Johnson	16	0.0
Total votes		280,598	100.0
Turnout			
Democratic hold			

== District 6 ==
2000 Florida's 6th congressional district election
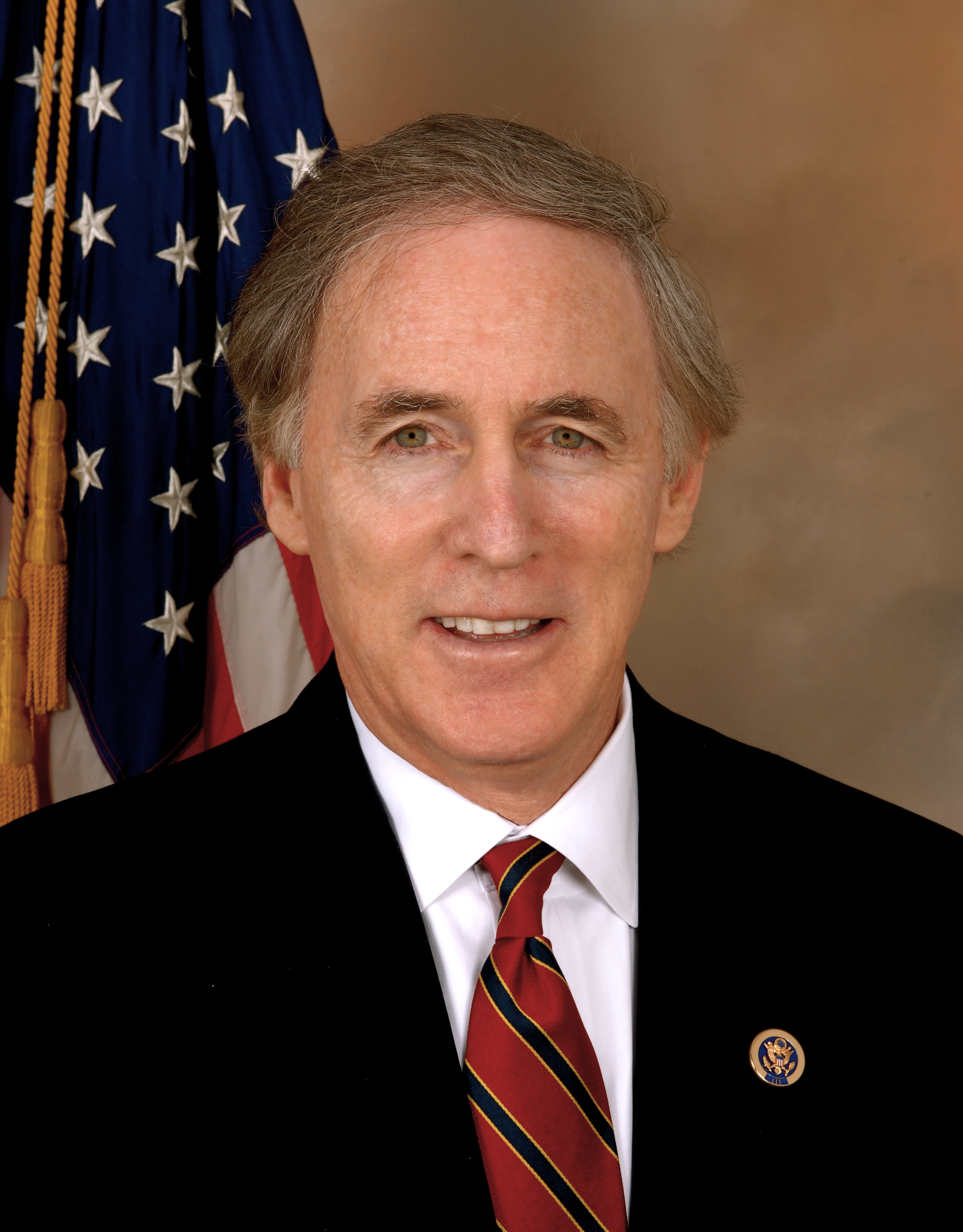
Nominee	Cliff Stearns
Party	Republican
Popular vote	178,789
Percentage	99.9%
U.S. Representative before election
Cliff Stearns
Republican
Elected U.S. Representative
Cliff Stearns
Republican

Republican Cliff Stearns, who had been in office since 1989, ran for a seventh term in 2000. He faced no primary challengers or a Democratic candidate in the general election. Timothy Clower, a Jacksonville taxi business owner and a write-in candidate for this election, intended to use the term limits issue against Stearns, as he promised in 1988 that he would serve only six terms. Barbara Elliott of Bradenton also ran as a write-in candidate. The term limits issue failed to gain traction, as Stearns was re-elected almost unanimously, winning approximately 99.9% of the votes. General election results

Florida 6th Congressional District 2000
Party	Candidate	Votes	%
Republican	Cliff Stearns	178,789	99.9
Write-In	Timothy Clower	152	0.1
Write-In	Barbara Elliott	31	0.0
Total votes		178,972	100.0
Turnout			
Republican hold			

== District 7 ==
2000 Florida's 7th congressional district election
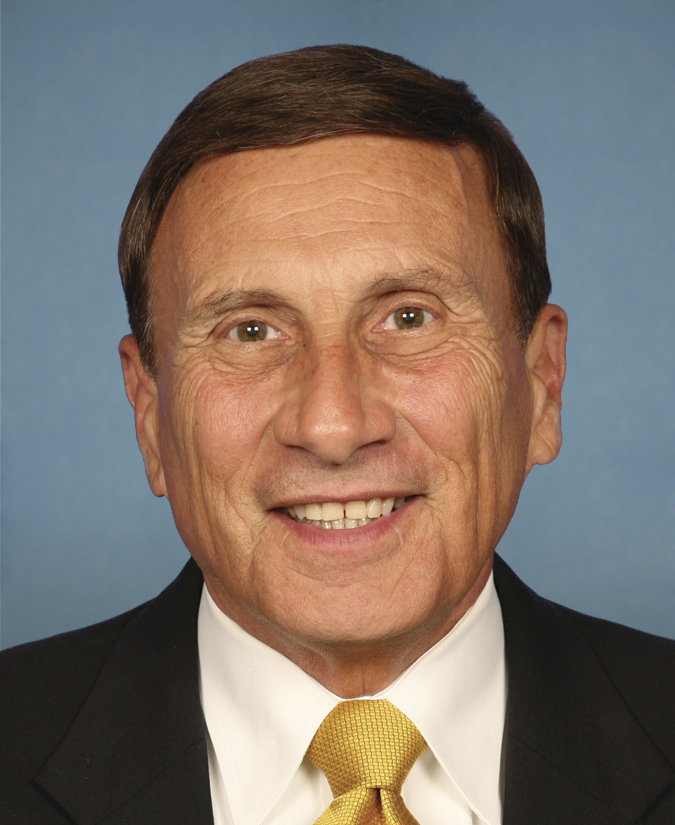

Nominee	John Mica	Dan Vaughen
Party	Republican	Democratic
Popular vote	171,018	99,531
Percentage	63.2%	36.8%
- County results Mica: 50–60% 60–70%
U.S. Representative before election
John Mica
Republican
Elected U.S. Representative
John Mica
Republican

Republican John Mica has been elected every two years since 1992. He sought re-election again in 2000. Mica faced did not face a primary challenge; neither did his Democratic opponent, Dan Vaughen, a DeLand lawyer and ethics in law professor at the University of Central Florida. Additionally, Norman E. Nelson was eligible as a write-in candidate. Mica was endorsed by the Orlando Sentinel, which noted that "John Mica is the kind of representative others should strive to be." Mica prevailed in a landslide, collecting about 63.2% of the votes. General election results

Florida 7th Congressional District 2000
Party	Candidate	Votes	%
Republican	John Mica	171,018	63.2
Democratic	Dan Vaughen	99,531	36.8
Write-In	Norman E. Nelson	11	0.0
Total votes		270,560	100.0
Turnout			
Republican hold			

== District 8 ==
2000 Florida's 8th congressional district election
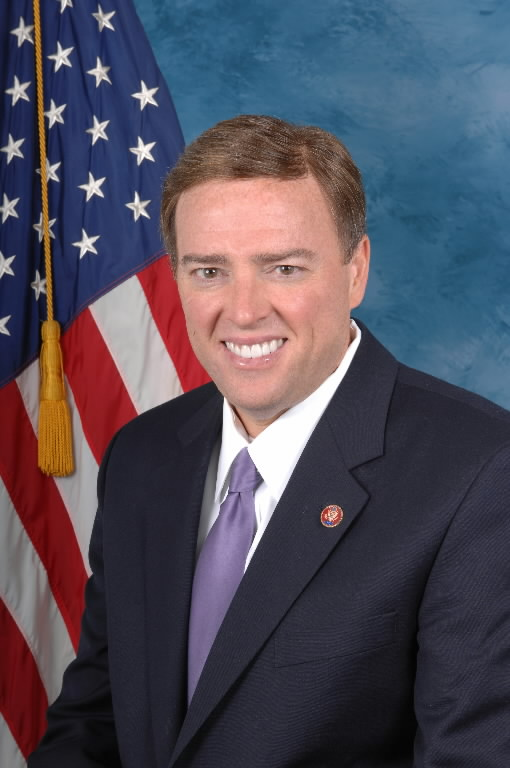

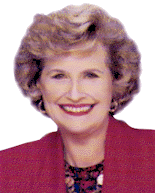
Nominee	Ric Keller	Linda Chapin
Party	Republican	Democratic
Popular vote	125,253	121,295
Percentage	50.8%	49.2%
- County results Keller: 50–60% Chapin: 50–60%
U.S. Representative before election
Bill McCollum
Republican
Elected U.S. Representative
Ric Keller
Republican

Republican Bill McCollum, who was first elected to this district in 1992, decided to run for the Senate seat of retiring incumbent Connie Mack III. This allowed for a very competitive Republican primary. By as early as August 1999, four candidates declared for the Republican nomination, including businessman Bob Hering, attorney Ric Keller, Orlando attorney Hector "Tico" Perez, and State Representative Bill Sublette. However, Perez withdrew from the race in December, around the time that then-State Senator Daniel Webster declined to run.

=== Republican primary ===
==== Candidates ====
- Bob Hering, businessman
- Ric Keller, attorney
- Bill Sublette, state representative from Orlando

===== Withdrew =====
- Tico Perez, Orlando attorney

===== Declined =====
- Daniel Webster, state senator from Clermont

==== Results ====
Republican primary results
Party	Candidate	Votes	%
Republican	Bill Sublette	18,196	43.4
Republican	Ric Keller	12,981	31.0
Republican	Bob Hering	10,736	25.6
Total votes		41,913	100

==== Run-off results ====
Republican run-off results
Party	Candidate	Votes	%
Republican	Ric Keller	16,292	51.9
Republican	Bill Sublette	15,077	48.1
Total votes		31,369	100

=== General election ===
==== Polling ====
Poll source	Date(s)	Sample size	Margin of error	Ric Keller (R)	Linda Chapin (D)	Other / undecided (Note: Calculated by taking the difference of 100% and all other candidates combined.)
SurveyUSA	November 1, 2000	500	—	55%	43%	2%
Voter/Consumer Research (R) (Note: Poll conducted for Ric Keller.)	October 30, 2000	400	—	47%	41%	12%
Zogby Analytics	October 29, 2000	400	—	50%	38%	12%
Mason-Dixon Polling & Strategy	October 21, 2000	426	—	39%	44%	17%

==== Results ====
Florida 8th Congressional District 2000
Party	Candidate	Votes	%
Republican	Ric Keller	125,253	50.8
Democratic	Linda Chapin	121,295	49.2
Write-In	Clay O. Hill	6	0.0
Write-In	Charlie Klein	39	0.0
Total votes		246,593	100.0
Turnout			
Republican hold			

== District 9 ==
2000 Florida's 9th congressional district election
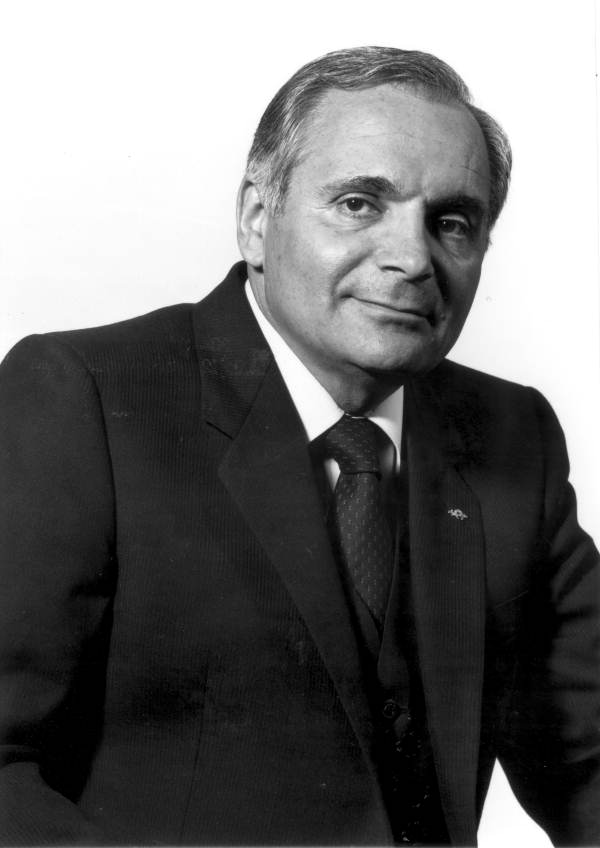

Nominee	Michael Bilirakis	Jon Duffey
Party	Republican	Reform
Popular vote	210,318	46,474
Percentage	81.9%	19.1%
- County results Bilirakis: 80–90%
U.S. Representative before election
Michael Bilirakis
Republican
Elected U.S. Representative
Michael Bilirakis
Republican

Republican Michael Bilirakis, first elected to the seat in 1982, sought another term in 2000. He was not challenged for the Republican nomination, nor did he face a Democratic opponent in the general election. Instead, Reform Party member Jon Duffey and write-in candidate Marie Ospina entered the race. Bilirakis won overwhelmingly, receiving 81.9% of the votes.

General election results

Florida 9th Congressional District 2000
Party	Candidate	Votes	%
Republican	Michael Bilirakis	210,318	81.9
Reform	Jon Duffey	46,474	19.1
Write-In	Marie Ospina	2	0.0
Total votes		256,794	100.0
Turnout			
Republican hold			

== District 10 ==
2000 Florida's 10th congressional district election

Nominee	C. W. Bill Young	Josette Green	Randy Heine
Party	Republican	Natural Law	Independent
Popular vote	146,799	26,908	20,296
Percentage	75.7%	13.9%	10.5%
- County results Young: 70–80%
U.S. Representative before election
Bill Young
Republican
Elected U.S. Representative
C. W. Bill Young
Republican

Results

Florida's 10th congressional district election, 2000
Party	Candidate	Votes	%
Republican	C. W. Bill Young	146,799	75.67%
Natural Law	Josette Green	26,908	13.87%
Independent	Randy Heine	20,296	10.46%
Total votes		194,003	100.00%

== District 11 ==
2000 Florida's 11th congressional district election
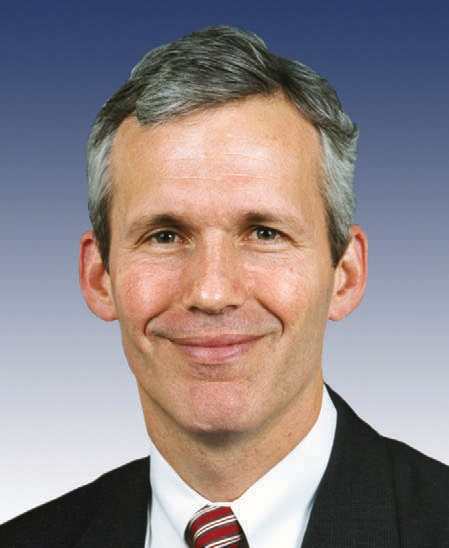

Nominee	Jim Davis	Charlie Westlake
Party	Democratic	Libertarian
Popular vote	149,465	27,197
Percentage	84.6%	15.4%
- County results Davis: 80–90%
U.S. Representative before election
Jim Davis
Democratic
Elected U.S. Representative
Jim Davis
Democratic

Results

Florida's 11th congressional district election, 2000
Party	Candidate	Votes	%
Democratic	Jim Davis	149,465	84.60%
Libertarian	Charlie Westlake	27,197	15.39%
Write-in	Write-ins	21	0.01%
Total votes		176,683	100.00%

== District 12 ==
2000 Florida's 12th congressional district election
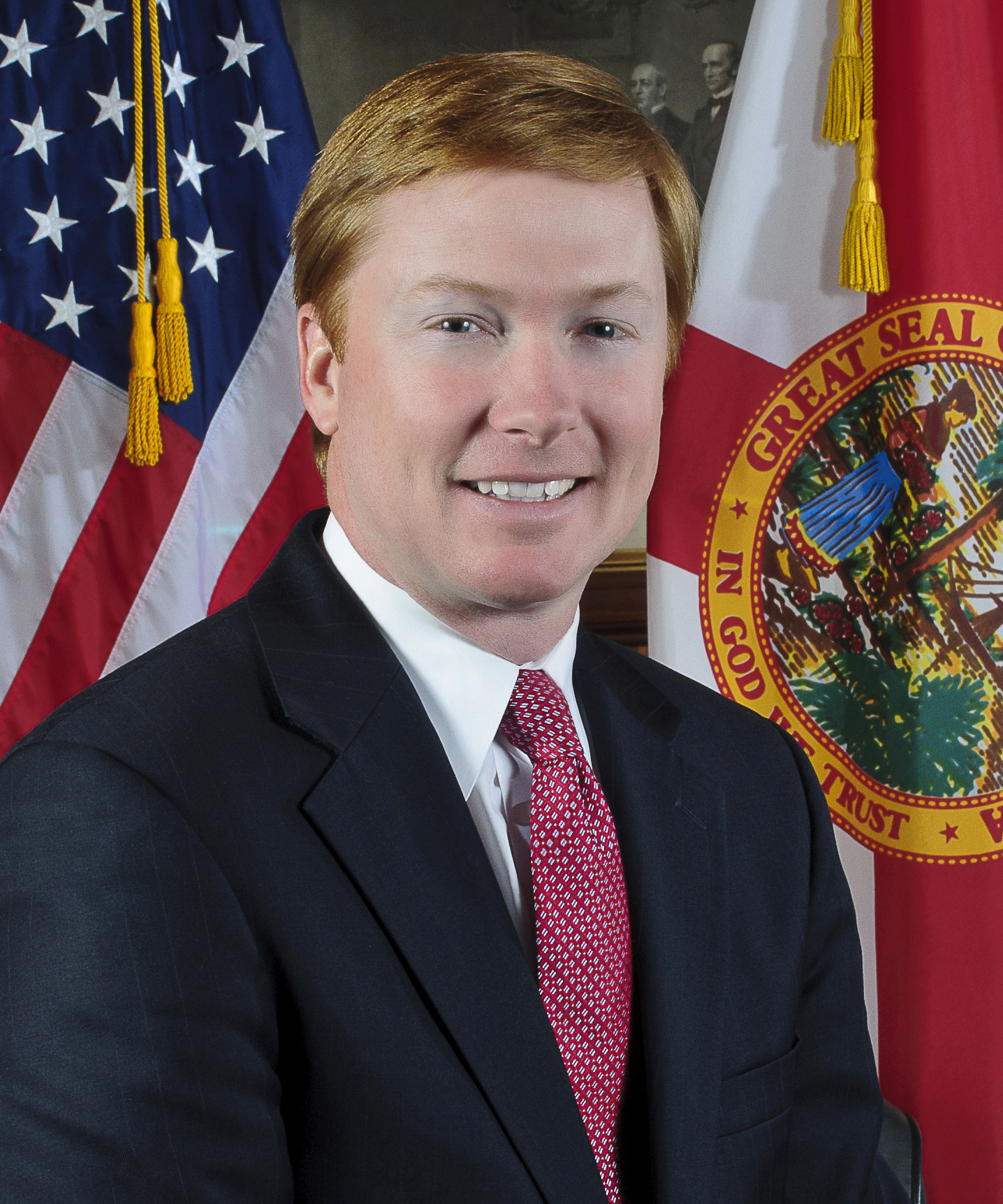

Nominee	Adam H. Putnam	Mike Stedem
Party	Republican	Democratic
Popular vote	125,224	94,395
Percentage	57.0%	43.0%
- County results Putnam: 50–60% 60–70%
U.S. Representative before election
Charles T. Canady
Republican
Elected U.S. Representative
Adam H. Putnam
Republican

Results

Florida's 12th congressional district election, 2000
Party	Candidate	Votes	%
Republican	Adam H. Putnam	125,224	57.02%
Democratic	Mike Stedem	94,395	42.98%
Write-in	Write-ins	6	0.00%
Total votes		219,625	100.00%

== District 13 ==
2000 Florida's 13th congressional district election
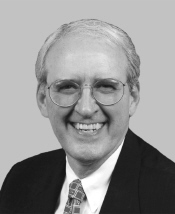

Nominee	Dan Miller	Daniel E. Dunn
Party	Republican	Democratic
Popular vote	175,918	99,568
Percentage	63.8%	36.1%
- County results Miller: 50–60% 60–70%
U.S. Representative before election
Dan Miller
Republican
Elected U.S. Representative
Dan Miller
Republican

Results

Florida's 13th congressional district election, 2000
Party	Candidate	Votes	%
Republican	Dan Miller	175,918	63.83%
Democratic	Daniel E. Dunn	99,568	36.13%
Write-in	Write-ins	101	0.04%
Total votes		275,587	100.00%

== District 14 ==
2000 Florida's 14th congressional district election
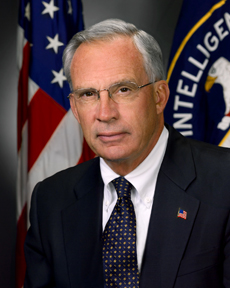

Nominee	Porter J. Goss	Sam Farling
Party	Republican	Natural Law
Popular vote	242,614	41,988
Percentage	85.2%	14.8%
- County results Goss: 80–90%
U.S. Representative before election
Porter Goss
Republican
Elected U.S. Representative
Porter J. Goss
Republican

Results

Florida's 14th congressional district election, 2000
Party	Candidate	Votes	%
Republican	Porter J. Goss	242,614	85.24%
Natural Law	Sam Farling	41,988	14.75%
Write-in	Write-ins	13	0.00%
Total votes		284,615	100.00%

== District 15 ==
2000 Florida's 15th congressional district election
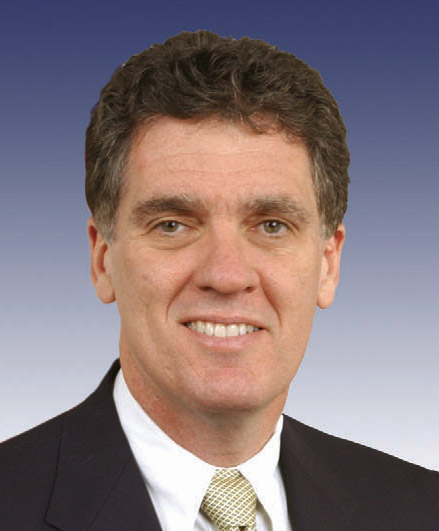

Nominee	Dave Weldon	Patsy Ann Kurth
Party	Republican	Democratic
Popular vote	176,189	117,511
Percentage	58.8%	39.2%
- County results Weldon: 50–60% 60–70%
U.S. Representative before election
Dave Weldon
Republican
Elected U.S. Representative
Dave Weldon
Republican

Results

Florida's 15th congressional district election, 2000
Party	Candidate	Votes	%
Republican	Dave Weldon	176,189	58.84%
Democratic	Patsy Ann Kurth	117,511	39.24%
Independent	Gerry L Newby	5,744	1.92%
Write-in	Write-ins	1	0.00%
Total votes		299,445	100.00%

== District 16 ==
2000 Florida's 16th congressional district election
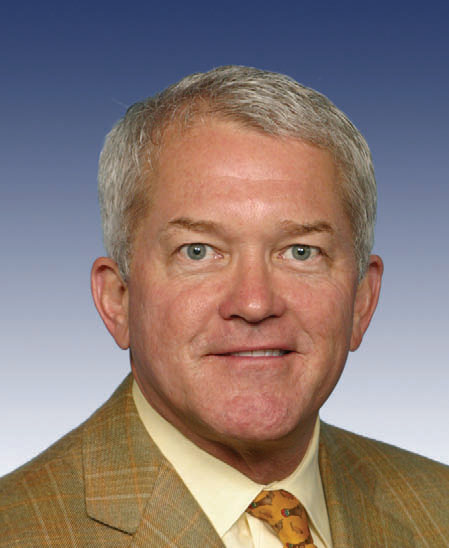

Nominee	Mark Foley	Jean Elliott Brown
Party	Republican	Democratic
Popular vote	176,153	108,782
Percentage	60.2%	37.2%
- County results Foley: 50–60% 60–70% 70–80%
U.S. Representative before election
Mark Foley
Republican
Elected U.S. Representative
Mark Foley
Republican

Results

Florida's 16th congressional district election, 2000
Party	Candidate	Votes	%
Republican	Mark Foley	176,153	60.22%
Democratic	Jean Elliott Brown	108,782	37.19%
Reform	John McGuire	7,556	2.58%
Write-in	Write-ins	9	0.00%
Total votes		292,500	100.00%

== District 17 ==
2000 Florida's 17th congressional district election
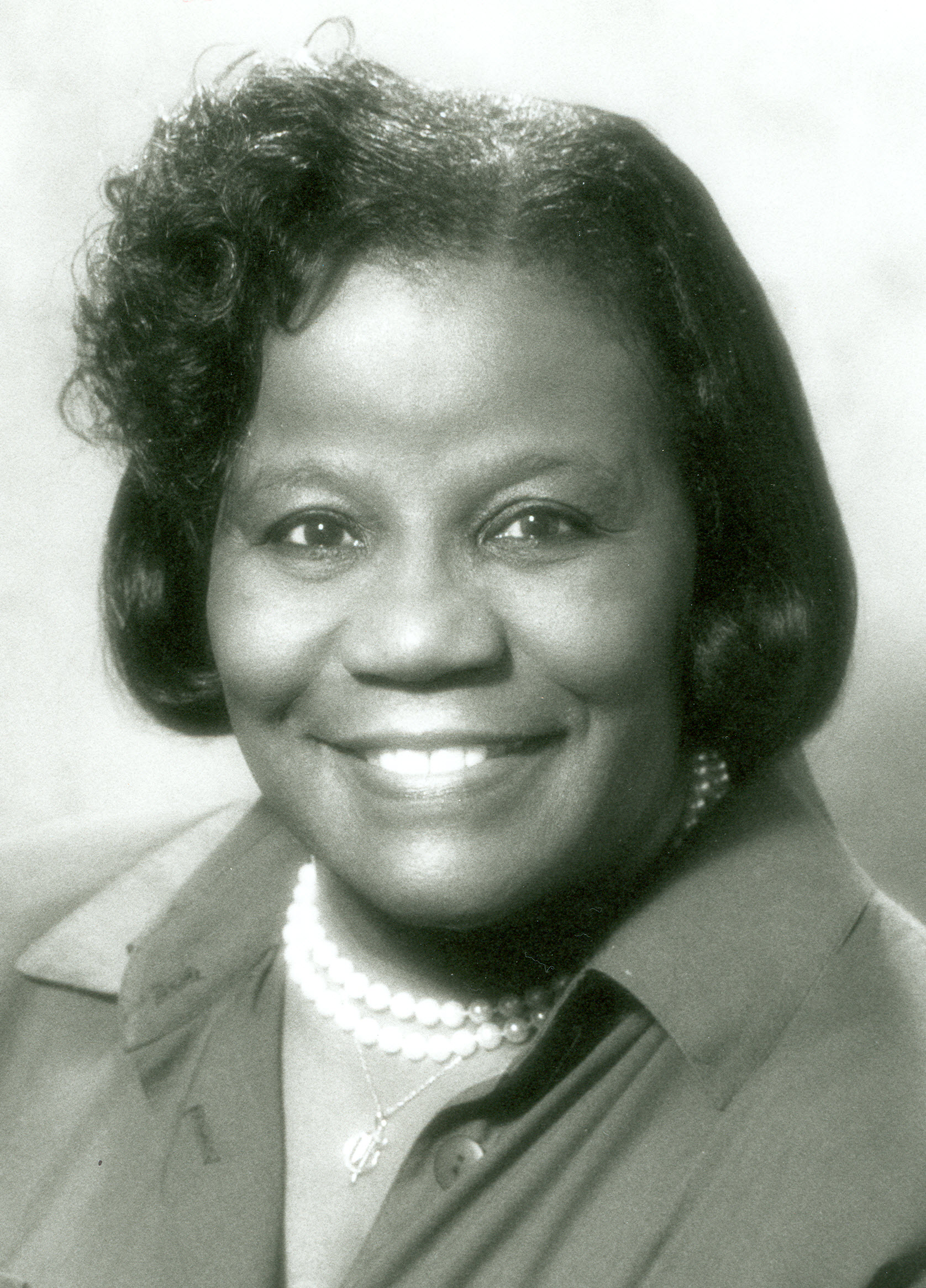
Nominee	Carrie P. Meek
Party	Democratic
Popular vote	100,715
Percentage	100.0%
U.S. Representative before election
Carrie Meek
Democratic
Elected U.S. Representative
Carrie P. Meek
Democratic

Results

Florida's 17th congressional district election, 2000
Party	Candidate	Votes	%
Democratic	Carrie P. Meek	100,715	100.00%
Write-in	Write-ins	3	0.00%
Total votes		100,718	100.00%

== District 18 ==
2000 Florida's 18th congressional district election
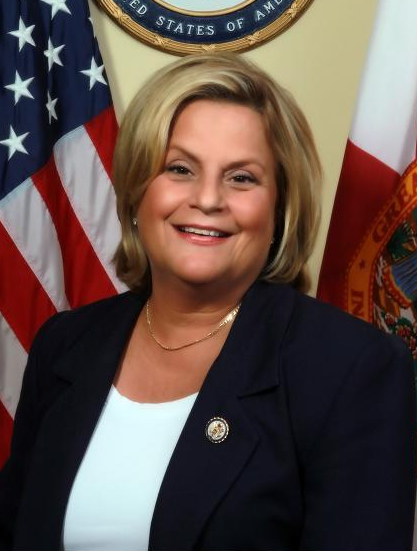
Nominee	Ileana Ros-Lehtinen
Party	Republican
Popular vote	112,968
Percentage	100.0%
U.S. Representative before election
Ileana Ros-Lehtinen
Republican
Elected U.S. Representative
Ileana Ros-Lehtinen
Republican

Results

Florida's 18th congressional district election, 2000
Party	Candidate	Votes	%
Republican	Ileana Ros-Lehtinen	112,968	99.98%
Write-in	Write-ins	23	0.02%
Total votes		112,991	100.00%

== District 19 ==
2000 Florida's 19th congressional district election
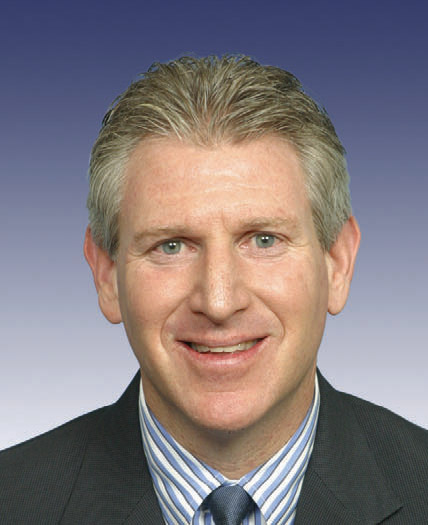

Nominee	Robert Wexler	Morris Kent Thompson
Party	Democratic	Republican
Popular vote	171,080	67,789
Percentage	71.6%	28.4%
- County results Wexler: 70–80%
U.S. Representative before election
Robert Wexler
Democratic
Elected U.S. Representative
Robert Wexler
Democratic

Results

Florida's 19th congressional district election, 2000
Party	Candidate	Votes	%
Democratic	Robert Wexler	171,080	71.62%
Republican	Morris Kent Thompson	67,789	28.38%
Total votes		238,869	100.00%

== District 20 ==
2000 Florida's 20th congressional district election
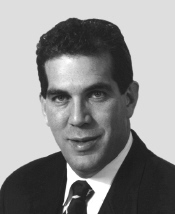
Nominee	Peter Deutsch
Party	Democratic
Popular vote	156,765
Percentage	99.9%
U.S. Representative before election
Peter Deutsch
Democratic
Elected U.S. Representative
Peter Deutsch
Democratic

Results

Florida's 20th congressional district election, 2000
Party	Candidate	Votes	%
Democratic	Peter Deutsch	156,765	99.88%
Write-in	Write-ins	187	0.12%
Total votes		156,952	100.00%

== District 21 ==
2000 Florida's 21st congressional district election
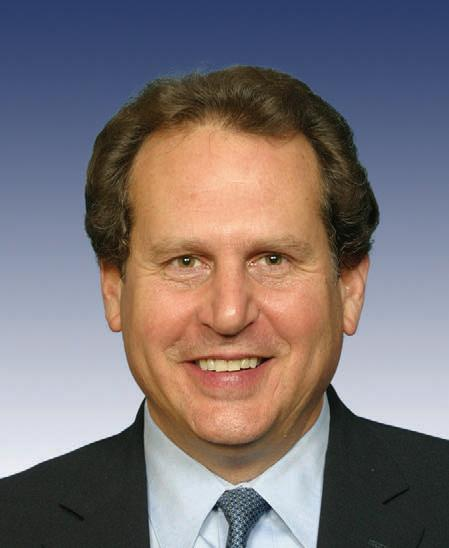
Nominee	Lincoln Diaz-Balart
Party	Republican
Popular vote	132,317
Percentage	100.0%
U.S. Representative before election
Lincoln Díaz-Balart
Republican
Elected U.S. Representative
Lincoln Diaz-Balart
Republican

Results

Florida's 21st congressional district election, 2000
Party	Candidate	Votes	%
Republican	Lincoln Diaz-Balart	132,317	99.98%
Write-in	Write-ins	25	0.02%
Total votes		132,342	100.00%

== District 22 ==
2000 Florida's 22nd congressional district election

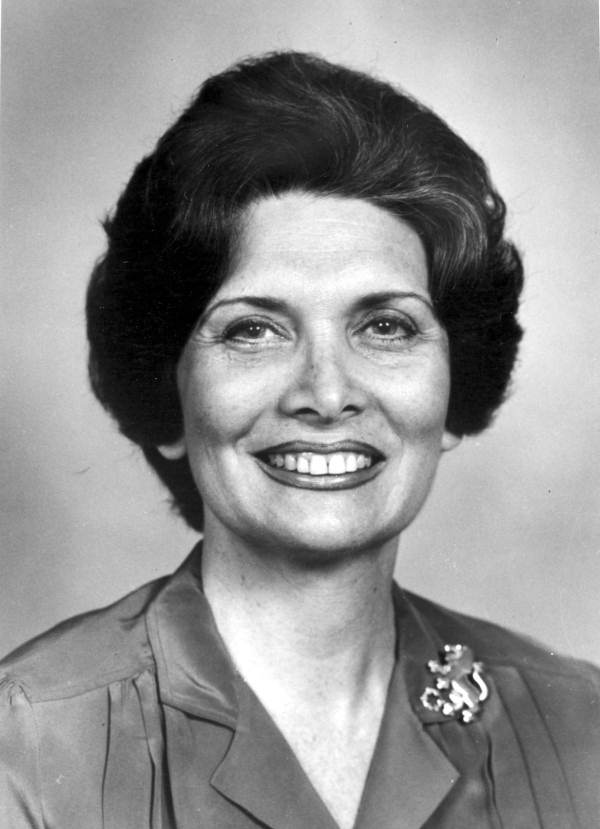
Nominee	E. Clay Shaw, Jr.	Elaine Bloom
Party	Republican	Democratic
Popular vote	105,855	105,256
Percentage	50.1%	49.9%
- County results Shaw: 50–60% Bloom: 60–70%
U.S. Representative before election
Clay Shaw
Republican
Elected U.S. Representative
E. Clay Shaw, Jr.
Republican

=== General election ===
==== Polling ====
Poll source	Date(s)	Sample size	Margin of error	Clay Shaw (R)	Elaine Bloom (D)	Other / undecided (Note: Calculated by taking the difference of 100% and all other candidates combined.)
SurveyUSA	October 31, 2000	500	—	45%	52%	3%

==== Results ====
Results

Florida's 22nd congressional district election, 2000
Party	Candidate	Votes	%
Republican	E. Clay Shaw, Jr.	105,855	50.14%
Democratic	Elaine Bloom	105,256	49.86%
Write-in	Write-ins	1	0.00%
Total votes		211,112	100.00%

== District 23 ==
2000 Florida's 23rd congressional district election
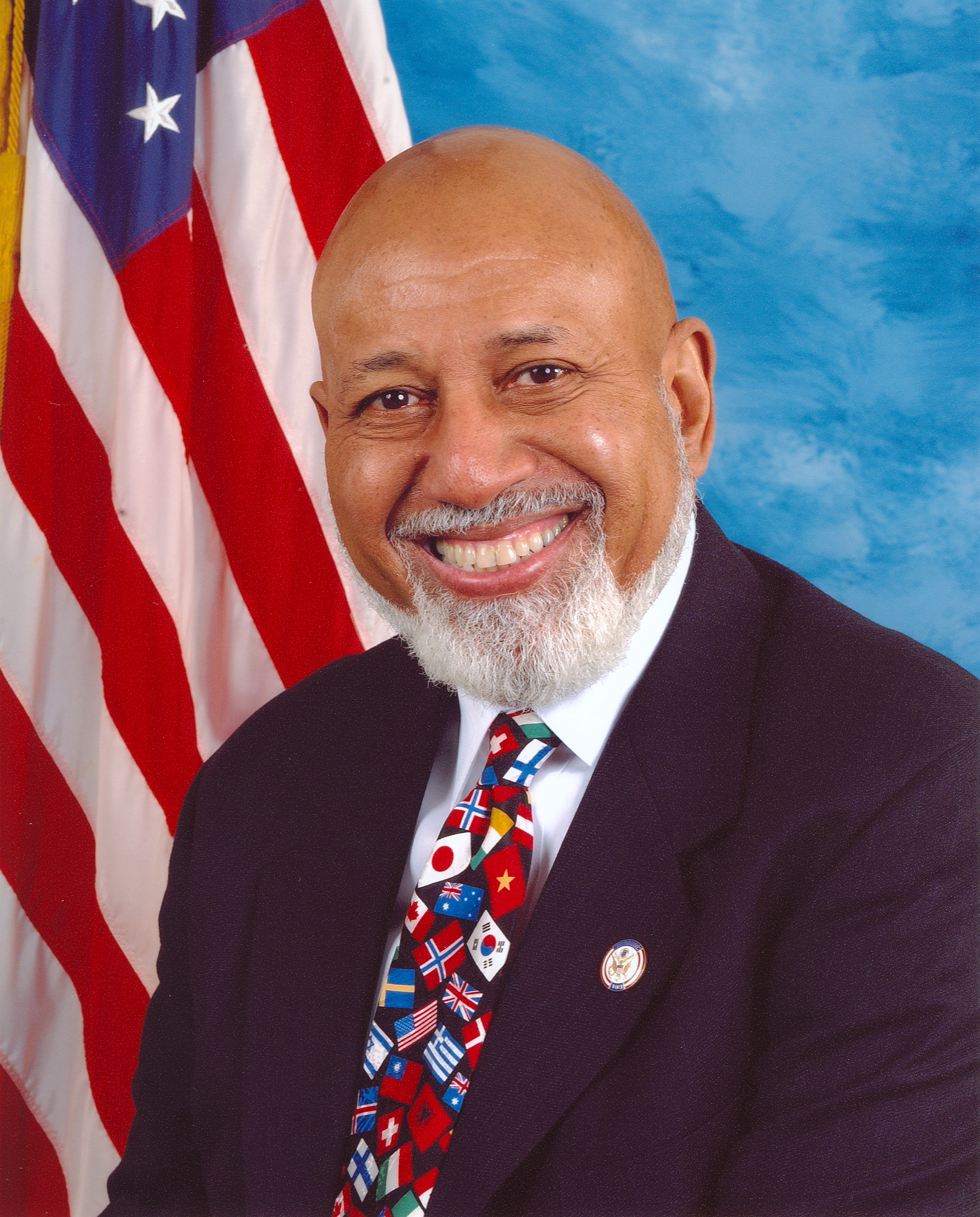

Nominee	Alcee L. Hastings	Bill Lambert
Party	Democratic	Republican
Popular vote	89,179	27,630
Percentage	76.3%	23.6%
- County results Hastings: 50–60% 60–70% 70–80% 80–90% 90–100%
U.S. Representative before election
Alcee Hastings
Democratic
Elected U.S. Representative
Alcee L. Hastings
Democratic

Results

Florida's 23rd congressional district election, 2000
Party	Candidate	Votes	%
Democratic	Alcee L. Hastings	89,179	76.34%
Republican	Bill Lambert	27,630	23.65%
Write-in	Write-ins	4	0.00%
Total votes		116,813	100.00%
