= 1998 Orange County, Florida Chairman election =

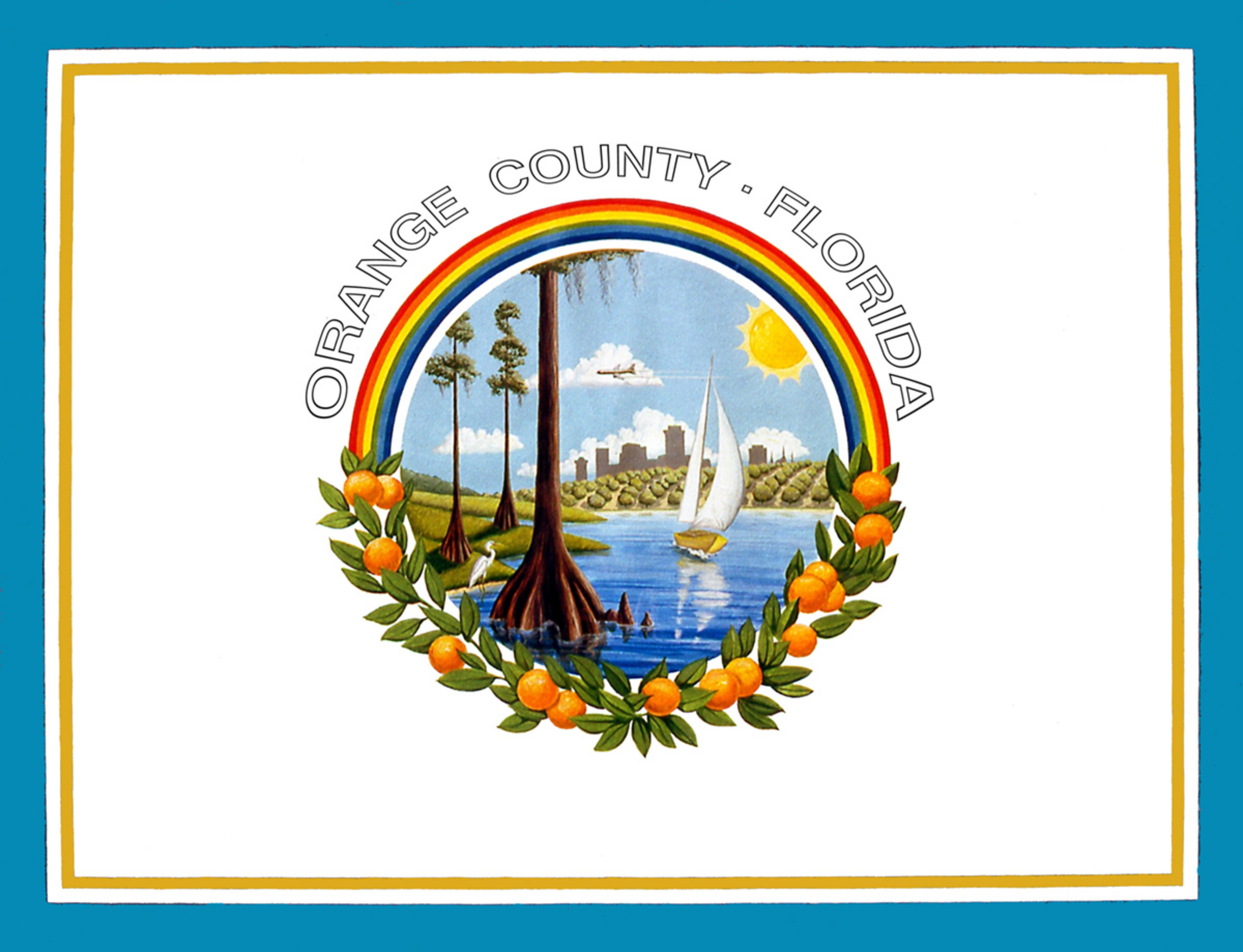
- September 1, 1998; November 3, 1998
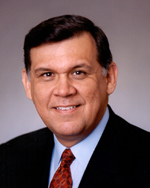

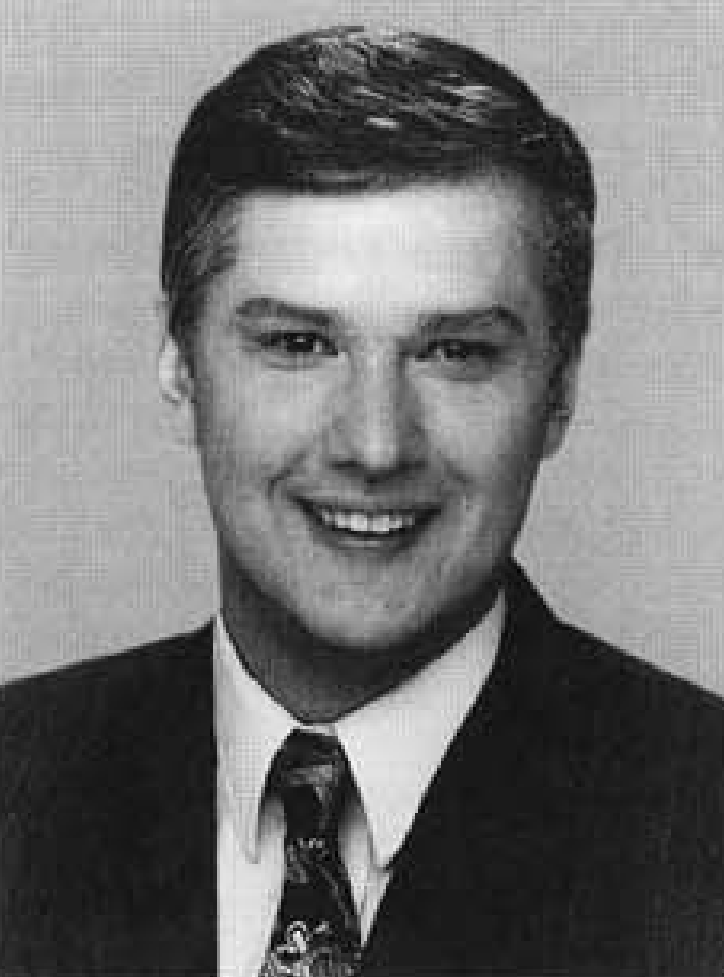

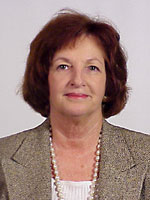
Candidate	Mel Martínez	John Ostalkiewicz	Fran Pignone
First round	32,982; 39.96%	33,573; 40.68%	11,451; 13.88%
Runoff	100,434; 59.99%	66,988; 40.01%	Eliminated
Chairman before election
Linda Chapin
Nonpartisan
Elected Chairman
Mel Martínez
Nonpartisan

The 1998 Orange County, Florida, Chairman election took place on November 3, 1998, following a primary election on September 1, 1998. Incumbent Chairman Linda Chapin was term-limited and barred from seeking a third consecutive term. Though the race was formally nonpartisan, two Republican candidates advanced to the general election. State Senator John Ostalkiewicz placed first in the primary with 41 percent of the vote, and Orlando Utilities Commission President Mel Martínez placed second with 40 percent. In the general election, Martínez defeated Ostalkiewicz in a landslide, winning 60 percent of the vote. However, halfway through Martínez's term, he would resign to become U.S. Secretary of Housing and Urban Development.

== Primary election ==
=== Candidates ===
- John Ostalkiewicz, State Senator (Republican)
- Mel Martínez, President of the Orlando Utilities Commission, 1994 Republican candidate for Lieutenant Governor (Republican)
- Fran Pignone, former Orange County Commissioner, 1994 candidate for Chairman (Democratic)
- Alex Lamour, mortgage broker
- Jim Newslow, retired doctor

=== Results ===
1998 Orange County, Florida, Chairman primary election
Party	Candidate	Votes	%
Nonpartisan	John Ostalkiewicz	33,573	40.68%
Nonpartisan	Mel Martínez	32,982	39.96%
Nonpartisan	Fran Pignone	11,451	13.88%
Nonpartisan	Alex Lamour	3,274	3.97%
Nonpartisan	Jim Newslow	1,248	1.51%
Total votes		82,528	100.00%

== General election ==
=== Results ===
1998 Orange County, Florida, Chairman general election
Party	Candidate	Votes	%
Nonpartisan	Mel Martínez	100,434	59.99%
Nonpartisan	John Ostalkiewicz	66,988	40.01%
Total votes		167,422	100.00%
