= 1990 Orange County, Florida Chairman election =

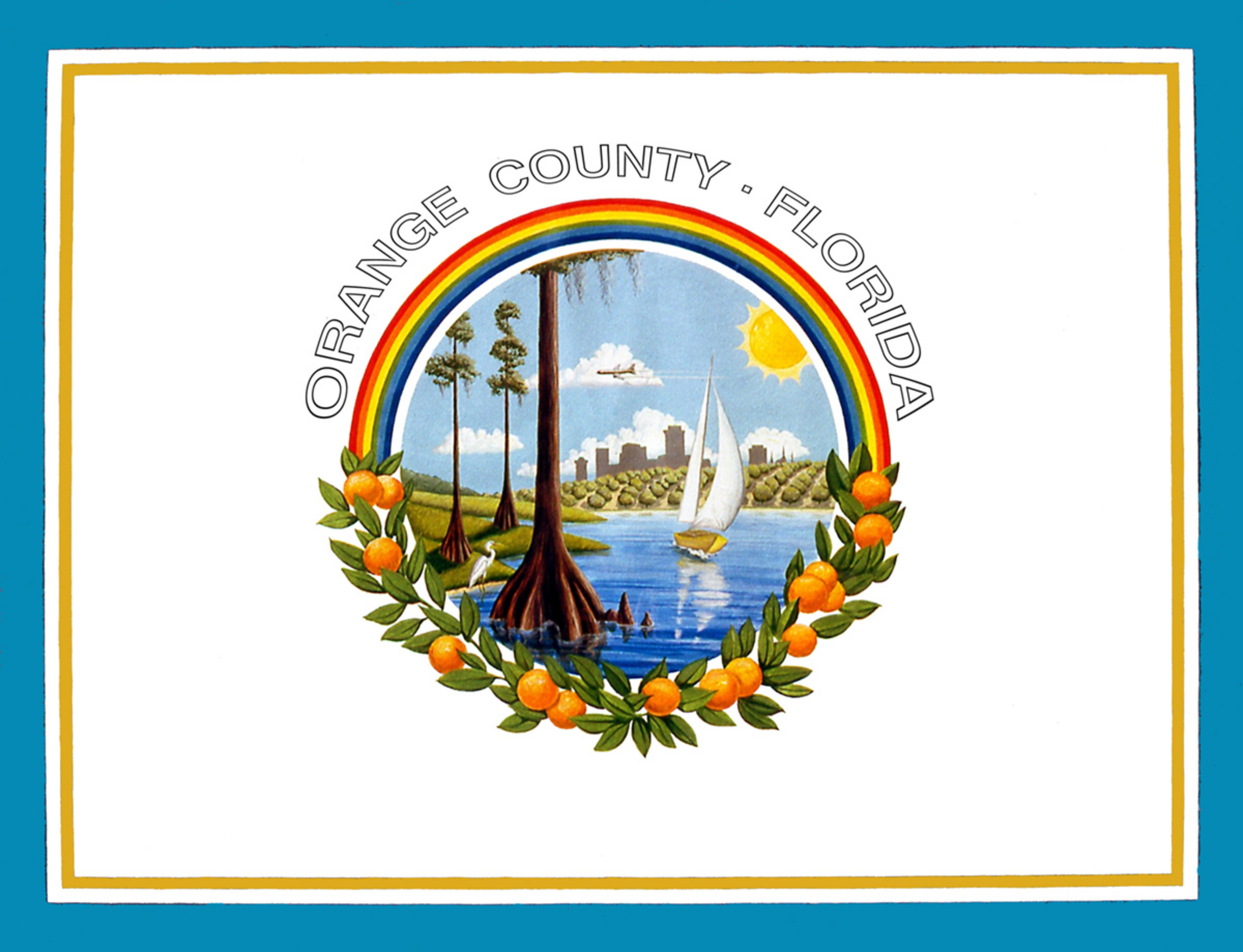
- November 6, 1990
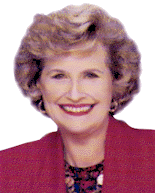

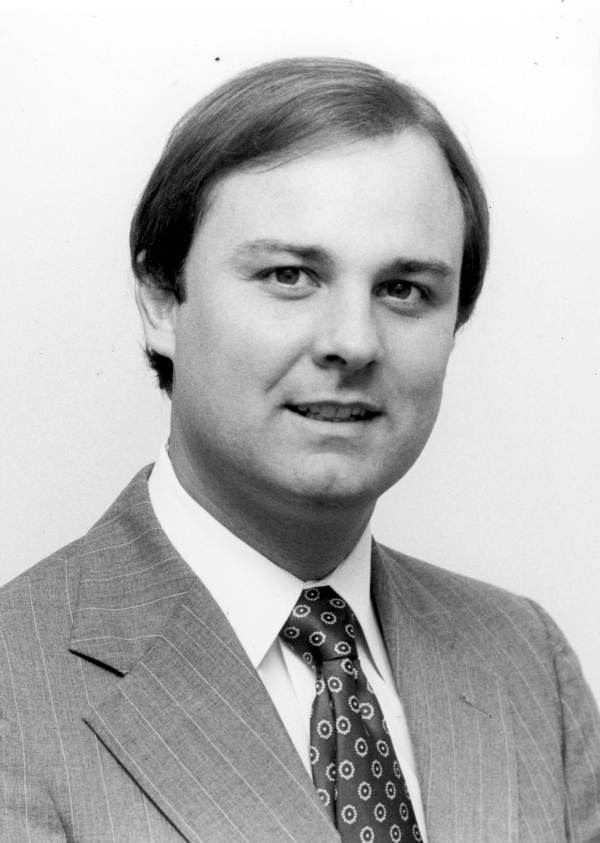
Nominee	Linda Chapin	Tom Drage
Party	Democratic	Republican
Popular vote	80,844	72,860
Percentage	52.60%	47.40%
Chairman before election
Position established
Elected Chairman
Linda Chapin
Nonpartisan

The 1990 Orange County, Florida Chairman election took place on November 6, 1990, to elect the Chairman of Orange County, Florida. The 1990 election was the first election for the position after voters approved the Orange County Charter in 1986 and amended it in 1988 to establish a county-wide executive position. County Commissioner Linda Chapin won the Democratic nomination unopposed and faced Republican State Representative Tom Drage in the general election. Chapin narrowly defeated Drage, winning 53 percent of the vote to his 47 percent, becoming the first elected Chairman of the county.

In 1992, Orange County voters amended the County Charter to implement nonpartisan elections for Chairman and the County Commission. As a result, this is the only election for Mayor or Chairman of Orange County to have taken place with partisan identifications on the ballot.

== Democratic nomination ==
County Commissioner Linda Chapin was the only candidate to file for the Democratic nomination and won the primary unopposed.

== Republican primary ==
=== Candidates ===
- Tom Drage, State Representative
- Tom Dorman, County Commissioner

==== Declined ====
- Bill Barnes, Orange County School Board member
- Jacob Stuart, President of the Greater Orlando Chamber of Commerce

=== Results ===
Republican primary results (unofficial)
Party	Candidate	Votes	%
Republican	Tom Drage	15,041	56.05%
Republican	Tom Dorman	11,795	43.95%
Total votes		26,836	100.00%

== General election ==
=== Results ===
1990 Orange County, Florida Chairman general election (unofficial)
Party	Candidate	Votes	%
Democratic	Linda Chapin	80,844	52.60%
Republican	Tom Drage	72,860	47.40%
Total votes		153,704	100.00%
Democratic win (new seat)			
