= Florida's 8th congressional district =

U.S. House district for Florida

Coordinates: 28°09′53″N 80°41′56″W

- Map of district boundaries
- Representative: Mike Haridopolos; R–Indian Harbour Beach
- Area: 2,412 mi^{2} (6,250 km^{2})
- Distribution: 94.11% urban; 5.89% rural
- Population (2025): 838,836
- Median household income: $80,160
- Ethnicity: 71.6% White; 11.6% Hispanic; 9.1% Black; 4.6% Two or more races; 2.3% Asian; 0.8% other
- Cook PVI: R+8

Florida's 8th congressional district is an electoral district for the U.S. Congress and was reassigned in 2012, effective January 2013, from the inland central part of Florida to the central Atlantic coast. The district includes Titusville, Melbourne, Cocoa, Cape Canaveral, and Vero Beach. The district includes all of Brevard and Indian River counties and parts of Orange County. The district also includes the Kennedy Space Center and Cape Canaveral Space Force Station.

Currently, the residents of the eighth district are represented by Republican Mike Haridopolos, who has held the seat since 2025.

== Composition ==
For the 118th and successive Congresses (based on redistricting following the 2020 census), the district contains all or portions of the following counties and communities:

Brevard County (31)

All 31 communities

Indian River County (15)

All 15 communities

Orange County (2)

Christmas (part; also 10th), Wedgefield (part; also 10th)

== List of members representing the district ==
Member	Party	Years	Cong ress	Electoral history	District location
District created January 3, 1953
Donald R. Matthews (Gainesville)	Democratic	January 3, 1953 – January 3, 1967	83rd 84th 85th 86th 87th 88th 89th	Elected in 1952. Re-elected in 1954. Re-elected in 1956. Re-elected in 1958. Re-elected in 1960. Re-elected in 1962. Re-elected in 1964. Lost renomination.	
William C. Cramer (St. Petersburg)	Republican	January 3, 1967 – January 3, 1971	90th 91st	Redistricted from the 12th district and re-elected in 1966. Re-elected in 1968. Retired to run for U.S. Senator.	
Bill Young (Seminole)	Republican	January 3, 1971 – January 3, 1973	92nd	Elected in 1970. Redistricted to the 6th district.	
James A. Haley (Sarasota)	Democratic	January 3, 1973 – January 3, 1977	93rd 94th	Redistricted from the 7th district and re-elected in 1972. Re-elected in 1974. Retired.	
Andy Ireland (Winter Park)	Democratic	January 3, 1977 – January 3, 1983	95th 96th 97th	Elected in 1976. Re-elected in 1978. Re-elected in 1980. Redistricted to the 10th district.	
Bill Young (St. Petersburg)	Republican	January 3, 1983 – January 3, 1993	98th 99th 100th 101st 102nd	Redistricted from the 6th district and re-elected in 1982. Re-elected in 1984. Re-elected in 1986. Re-elected in 1988. Re-elected in 1990. Redistricted to the 10th district.	
Bill McCollum (Longwood)	Republican	January 3, 1993 – January 3, 2001	103rd 104th 105th 106th	Redistricted from the 5th district and re-elected in 1992. Re-elected in 1994. Re-elected in 1996. Re-elected in 1998. Retired to run for U.S. Senator.	1993–2003 [data missing]
Ric Keller (Orlando)	Republican	January 3, 2001 – January 3, 2009	107th 108th 109th 110th	Elected in 2000. Re-elected in 2002. Re-elected in 2004. Re-elected in 2006. Lost re-election.	1993–2003 [data missing]
Ric Keller (Orlando)	Republican	January 3, 2001 – January 3, 2009	107th 108th 109th 110th	Elected in 2000. Re-elected in 2002. Re-elected in 2004. Re-elected in 2006. Lost re-election.	2003–2013
Alan Grayson (Orlando)	Democratic	January 3, 2009 – January 3, 2011	111th	Elected in 2008. Lost re-election.	2003–2013
Daniel Webster (Orlando)	Republican	January 3, 2011 – January 3, 2013	112th	Elected in 2010. Redistricted to the 10th district.	2003–2013
Bill Posey (Rockledge)	Republican	January 3, 2013 – January 3, 2025	113th 114th 115th 116th 117th 118th	Redistricted from the 15th district and re-elected in 2012. Re-elected in 2014. Re-elected in 2016. Re-elected in 2018. Re-elected in 2020. Re-elected in 2022. Retired.	2013–2023
Bill Posey (Rockledge)	Republican	January 3, 2013 – January 3, 2025	113th 114th 115th 116th 117th 118th	Redistricted from the 15th district and re-elected in 2012. Re-elected in 2014. Re-elected in 2016. Re-elected in 2018. Re-elected in 2020. Re-elected in 2022. Retired.	2023–2027
Mike Haridopolos (Indian Harbour Beach)	Republican	January 3, 2025– present	119th	Elected in 2024. Re-elected in 2026.	2023–2027

== Recent election results from statewide races ==
Year	Office	Results
2008	President	McCain 55% - 44%
2010	Senate	Rubio 55% - 15%
2010	Governor	Scott 58% - 42%
2010	Attorney General	Bondi 60% - 33%
2010	Chief Financial Officer	Atwater 61% - 31%
2012	President	Romney 57% - 43%
2012	Senate	Nelson 51% - 49%
2014	Governor	Scott 57% - 43%
2016	President	Trump 58% - 37%
2016	Senate	Rubio 59% - 36%
2018	Senate	Scott 58% - 42%
2018	Governor	DeSantis 58% - 40%
2018	Attorney General	Moody 61% - 37%
2018	Chief Financial Officer	Patronis 60% - 39%
2020	President	Trump 58% - 41%
2022	Senate	Rubio 63% - 36%
2022	Governor	DeSantis 65% - 35%
2022	Attorney General	Moody 67% - 33%
2022	Chief Financial Officer	Patronis 65% - 35%
2024	President	Trump 61% - 38%
2024	Senate	Scott 59% - 38%

== Election results ==
=== 1992 election ===
Incumbent Republican Bill McCollum (68.5%) won over Democrat Chuck Kovaleski (31.5%). McCollum, who previous served in FL-5 since 1981, was shifted to the 8th District after the redistricting.

=== 1994 election ===
Incumbent Republican Bill McCollum ran unopposed in the mid-terms. His re-election was part of the 1994 Republican Revolution.

=== 1996 election ===
Incumbent Republican Bill McCollum (67.47%) won easily over progressive Democrat and actor Al Krulick (32.52%).

=== 1998 election ===
Incumbent McCollum faced Krulick for the second time. McCollum won 66%-34%, a nearly identical margin from 1996. He won his seat for the tenth (and final) time. Despite some minor losses in the midterm for the GOP, McCollum was among the 15 Florida Republican incumbents who all won re-election.

=== 2000 election ===
Twenty year veteran Republican incumbent Bill McCollum retired from the seat, to run (unsuccessfully) for the open Senate seat in Florida. The open seat in District 8 would be fought between former Orange County Commission Chairwoman Linda Chapin (Democrat) and attorney Ric Keller (Republican).

Keller endured a rough primary, which went to a runoff between himself and state representative Bill Sublette. Sublette had received the most votes in the September 5th primary (43.41%), but not enough to avoid a runoff. On October 3, Keller flipped the results, and won the two-man primary 51.94%-48.06%.

Chapin quickly raised over $1.4 million in campaign contributions, more than Sublette and Keller combined. In the general election, Chapin touted her public experience over Keller, who was political newcomer and a virtual unknown. Keller attacked Chapin as anti-gun rights, and for a record of fiscal irresponsibility. He famously cited her spending of $18,500 in county funds for a bronze sculpture of a frog.

Keller narrowly won the traditionally Republican-leaning district by a margin of 51% to 49%.

Florida's 8th congressional district election, 2000
Party	Candidate	Votes	%
Republican	Ric Keller	125,253	50.79
Democratic	Linda Chapin	121,295	49.19
Write-ins	Charlie Klein	39	0.02
Write-ins	Clay O. Hill	6	0.00
Total votes		246,593	100.00
Republican hold			

=== 2002 ===
After the 2001 Congressional re-apportionment, Florida's 8th District was redistricted from a near equal representation (Democrat-Republican) to one that included seven percent more Republicans than Democrats.

Keller readily won the 2002 Congressional election against Democrat Eddie Diaz, winning with 65% of the vote.

=== 2004 ===
In 2004 Keller won his third term with 60% of the vote against Democratic challenger Stephen Murray.

=== 2006 election ===
In the 2006 election, Ric Keller was elected to his fourth two-year term, defeating Democrat Charlie Stuart, Independent Wes Hoaglund, and three write-in candidates.

Keller managed to hold on to his seat in the midst of a Democratic wave that was sweeping the country that November. Keller had been slipping in popularity, winning by lower margins in each election. He also had been mildly lampooned by local media with the nickname "Cheeseburger Ric," for introducing the so-called "Cheeseburger Bill" to the House floor in 2003 and again in 2005.

Florida's 8th congressional district election, 2006
Party	Candidate	Votes	%
Republican	Ric Keller (inc.)	95,258	52.79
Democratic	Charlie Stuart	82,526	45.73
Independent	Wes Hoaglund	2,640	1.46
Write-ins		20	0.01
Total votes		180,444	100.00
Republican hold			

=== 2008 election ===
Despite a prior pledge to serve only four terms, Congressman Ric Keller was running for his fifth term in the House of Representatives. Todd Long, a conservative Orlando attorney and radio talk show host, announced he would challenge Keller in the Republican primary, promising to make an issue of the broken term-limits pledge. The Keller-Long primary fight intensified over the summer, with Keller's term limit retraction, as well as his vote against The Surge making him increasingly vulnerable to defeat. However, just days before the August 26 primary, Keller sent out a mailer exposing Long's arrest record, a DUI, and another trespass warning. Keller won the primary with a 53%-47% margin, but his reputation took a hit, as many saw the mailer as a political "dirty trick".

Keller's Democratic opponent was attorney and progressive activist Alan Grayson, who emerged as the surprise victor of a large Democratic primary field which included moderate Democrat and long-time Central Florida political operative Charlie Stuart, attorney Mike Smith, engineer Alexander Fry, and recent law school graduate Quoc Van.

Grayson defeated Keller in the November general election receiving 52% of the vote, the same share as Barack Obama on the top of the ballot. Democratic activists in the district had mounted an aggressive campaign to register traditionally Democratic union workers and an increasing Hispanic (primarily Puerto Rican) demographic in the district. The general election was heated, with "mudslinging" and attack ads by both sides on television and in mailers. The race gained considerable national attention.

Florida's 8th congressional district election, 2008
Party	Candidate	Votes	%
Democratic	Alan Grayson	172,854	52.0
Republican	Ric Keller (incumbent)	159,490	48.0
Total votes		332,244	100.00
Democratic gain from Republican			

=== 2010 election ===
Freshman Democratic incumbent Alan Grayson ran unopposed for the nomination, while the Republican side was won by former State Senate Majority Leader and Speaker of the Florida House of Representatives Daniel Webster. After less than two years in congress, Grayson had become known as a firebrand liberal and outspoken critic on the House floor, often to the point of controversy even from members of his own party. GOP leaders early on targeted Grayson and this district, which had traditionally leaned republican, for challenge in the mid-term election.

Daniel Webster had initially rejected the suggestions by the Florida GOP to run for the seat, but in April 2010, he changed his mind and entered the race. Webster's name recognition and endorsements from Jeb Bush and Mike Huckabee helped him emerge as the front-runner. Webster won the GOP primary on August 24, 2010, defeating six other candidates, with 40% of the vote.

In the general election, Webster ran a traditional, conservative family values-based campaign. However, Grayson had a deep war chest fueled by a nationwide campaign fundraising network. Grayson ran attack ads, calling Webster a "draft-dodger" (Webster had received student deferments and a draft classification as medically unfit for service), and another calling Webster "Taliban Dan" for his perceived extreme right religious views on social issues.

Grayson's attack ads were criticized, and observers suggest they ultimately backfired. With just days left before voters went to the polls, Grayson was considered increasingly vulnerable to defeat. On election day, Webster defeated Grayson soundly by an 18-point margin, part of a sweeping 63-seat gain by House Republicans in the midterm election.

Florida's 8th congressional district election, 2010
Party	Candidate	Votes	%
Republican	Daniel Webster	123,464	56.13
Democratic	Alan Grayson (incumbent)	84,036	38.20
Florida TEA Party	Peg Dunmire	8,324	3.78
Independent	George Metcalfe	4,140	1.88
No party	Steven Gerritzen (write-in)		
Total votes		219,964	100
Republican gain from Democratic			

=== 2012 election ===
Previous incumbent Daniel Webster was redistricted to run instead for the 10th district. The "new" District 8 would comprise areas that formerly made up the 15th district.

Bill Posey, effectively running as the incumbent, won re-election with nearly 60% of the vote against Democratic nominee Shannon Roberts and non-partisan candidate Richard Gillmor.

Florida's 8th congressional district election, 2012
Party	Candidate	Votes	%
Republican	Bill Posey	205,432	58.9
Democratic	Shannon Roberts	130,870	37.5
No Party Affiliation	Richard Gillmor	12,607	3.6
Total votes		348,909	100.0

=== 2014 election ===
Florida's 8th congressional district election, 2014
Party	Candidate	Votes	%
Republican	Bill Posey (incumbent)	180,728	65.8
Democratic	Gabriel Rothblatt	93,724	34.2
Independent	Christopher L. Duncan (write-in)	61	0.0
Total votes		274,513	100.0
Republican hold			

=== 2016 election ===
Florida's 8th congressional district election, 2016
Party	Candidate	Votes	%
Republican	Bill Posey (incumbent)	246,483	63.1
Democratic	Corry Westbrook	127,127	32.6
Independent	Bill Stinson	16,951	4.3
Total votes		390,561	100.0
Republican hold			

=== 2018 election ===
Florida's 8th congressional district election, 2018
Party	Candidate	Votes	%
Republican	Bill Posey (incumbent)	218,112	60.5
Democratic	Sanjay Patel	142,415	39.5
Total votes		360,527	100.0
Republican hold			

=== 2020 election ===
Florida's 8th congressional district election, 2020
Party	Candidate	Votes	%
Republican	Bill Posey (incumbent)	282,093	61.4
Democratic	Jim Kennedy	177,695	38.6
Total votes		459,788	100.0
Republican hold			

=== 2022 election ===
Florida's 8th congressional district election, 2022
Party	Candidate	Votes	%
Republican	Bill Posey (incumbent)	222,128	64.9
Democratic	Joanne Terry	120,080	35.0
Total votes		342,208	100.0
Republican hold			

=== 2024 election ===
Florida's 8th congressional district election, 2024
Party	Candidate	Votes	%
Republican	Mike Haridopolos	280,352	62.24
Democratic	Sandy Kennedy	170,096	37.76
Total votes		450,448	100.0
Republican hold			
