= Milt's Stop & Eat =

Restaurant in Moab, Utah

Coordinates: 38.56768°N 109.542634°W

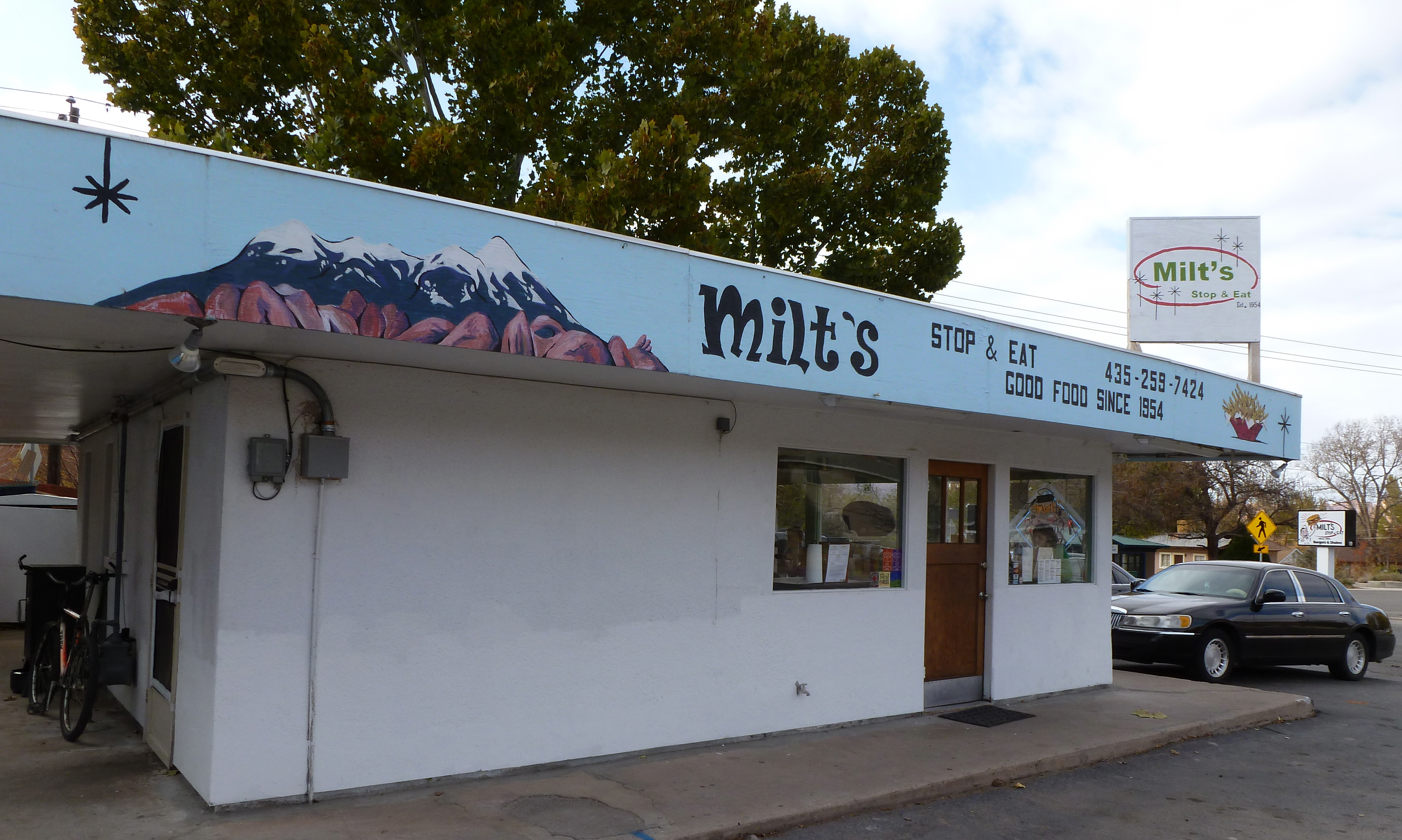
- Company type: Private
- Industry: Restaurants
- Genre: Fast food
- Founded: 1954; 72 years ago, in Moab, Utah, United States
- Founder: Milt Galbraith
- Number of locations: 1 (356 Millcreek Dr, Moab, UT)
- Areas served: Moab, Utah
- Website: MiltsStopAndEat.com

Milt's Stop & Eat is a restaurant in Moab, Utah. It is a walk-up style eatery that also features dine-in service. The restaurant was founded in 1954, during the emergence of fast food restaurants in the United States, and is the oldest restaurant in the city. Milt's Stop & Eat serves fast-food staples.

== History ==
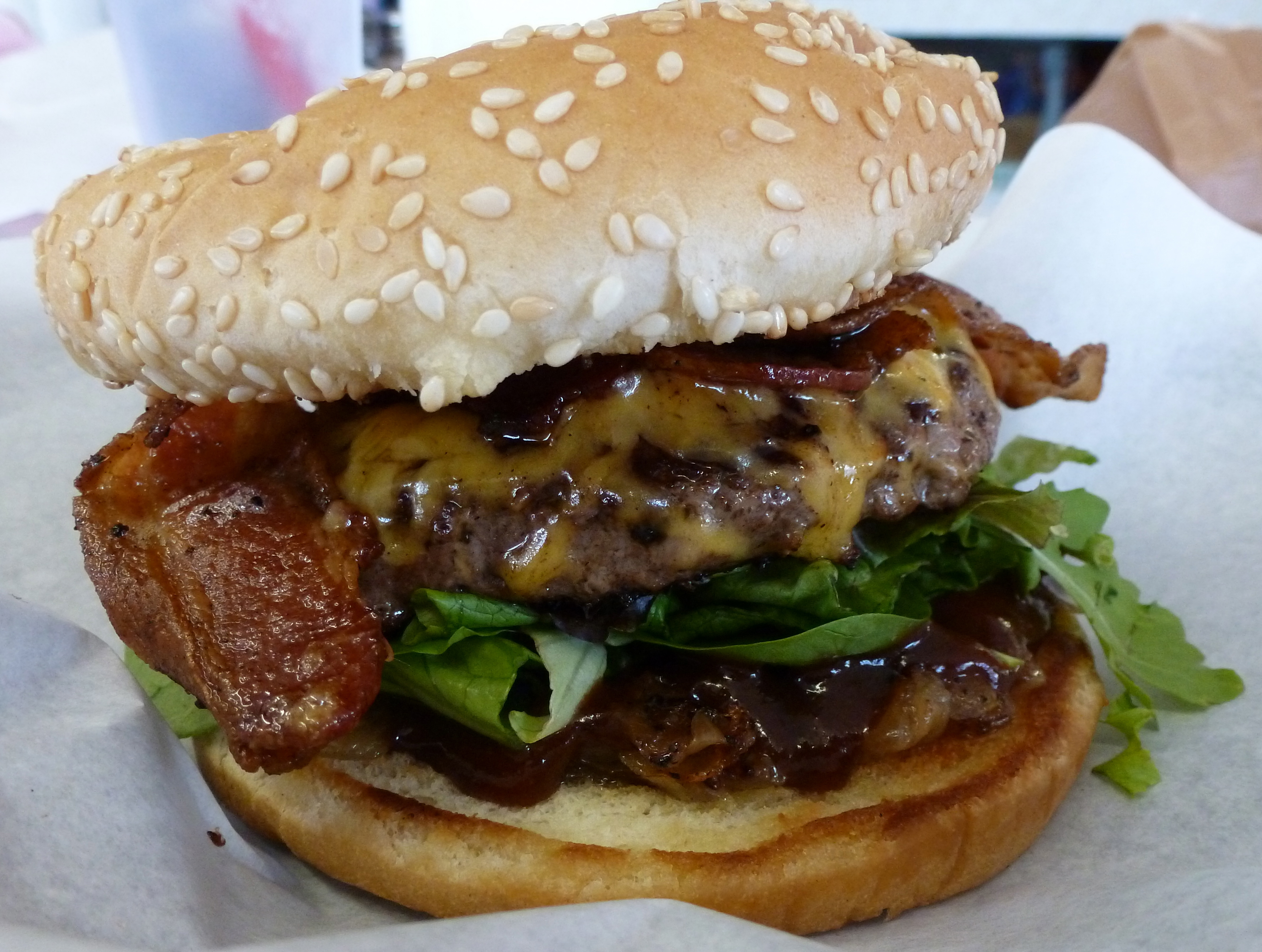
A cheeseburger from Milt's Stop & Eat.

Four blocks off Main Street in Moab, Utah, Milt's Stop & Eat opened in September 1954 by Milt and Audrey Galbraith. The Galbraiths moved to Moab during the town's uranium boom and opened their restaurant the same year. It is the oldest restaurant in the city and has largely remained the same as it was in 1954.

Milt's was owned by the Galbraiths for over 27 years, and the couple continued to eat there until Milt Galbraith died in 2014. Danelle "Nellie" Ballengee and her husband BC Laprade bought the diner in 2007 and introduced buffalo burgers to the menu.
