= Cheeseburger =

Hamburger topped with cheese

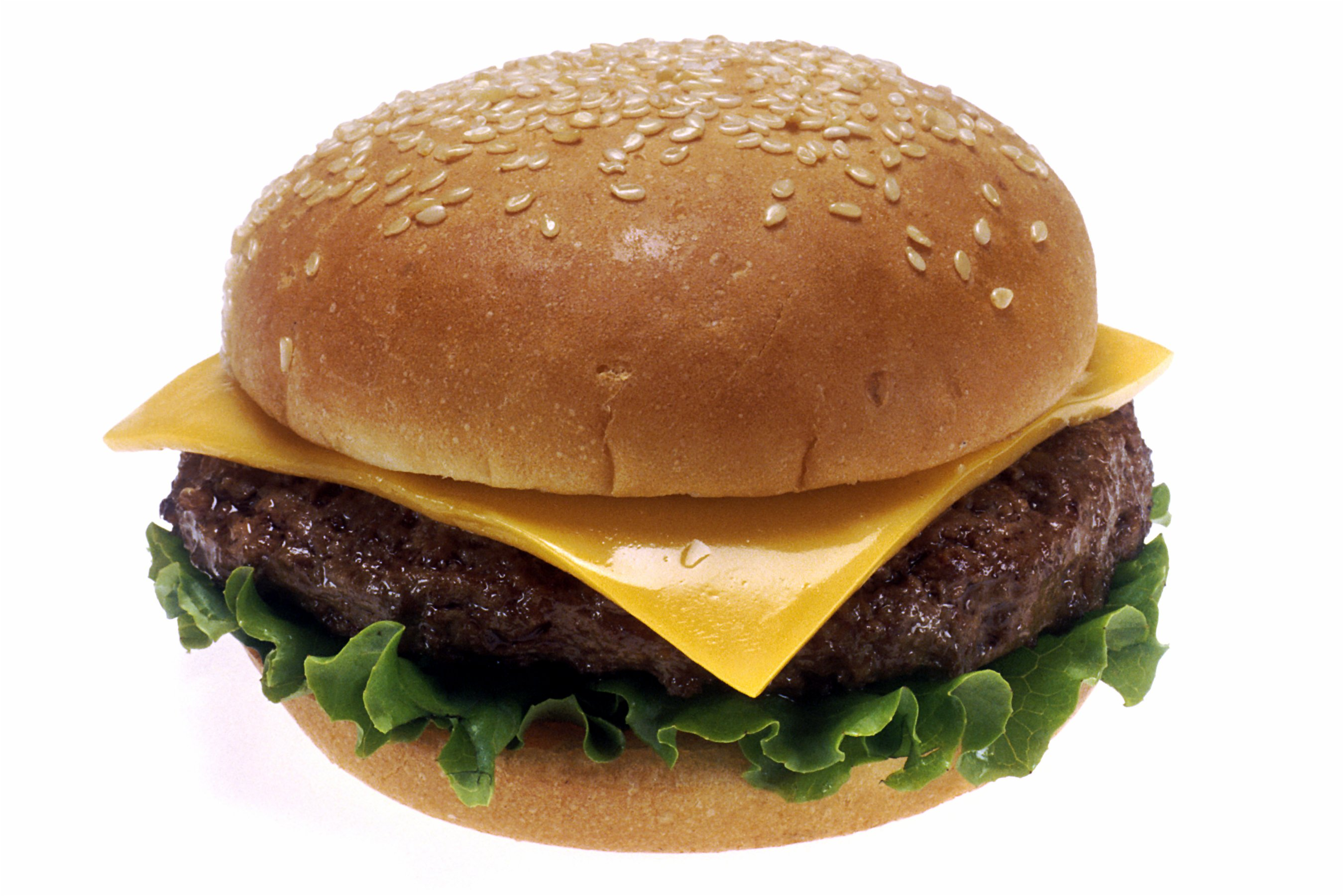
- Cheeseburger with lettuce and a slice of American cheese
- Course: Main course
- Place of origin: United States
- Serving temperature: Hot
- Main ingredients: Ground beef patty, cheese, bun

A cheeseburger is a hamburger with melted cheese on top of the meat patty, added near the end of the cooking time. Cheeseburgers can include variations in structure, ingredients and composition. As with other hamburgers, a cheeseburger may include various condiments and other toppings such as lettuce, tomato and ketchup.

In fast food restaurants across the United States, processed cheese is usually used, although other meltable cheeses are used, such as cheddar, Swiss, mozzarella, blue cheese, or pepper jack. Virtually all restaurants that sell hamburgers also offer cheeseburgers.

== Origins ==
By the late 19th century, the vast grasslands of the Great Plains had been opened up for cattle ranching. This made it possible for many Americans to consume beef almost daily. The hamburger remains one of the cheapest forms of beef in America.

Adding cheese to hamburgers became popular in the 1920s. There are several competing claims as to who created the first cheeseburger. Lionel Sternberger is reputed to have introduced the cheeseburger in 1924 at the age of 16. He was working as a fry cook at his father's Pasadena, California, sandwich shop, "The Rite Spot," and "experimentally dropped a slab of American cheese on a sizzling hamburger." An early example of the cheeseburger appearing on a menu is a 1928 menu for the Los Angeles restaurant O'Dell's, which listed a cheeseburger smothered with chili for 25 cents, or about $4.70 in 2025 after inflation.

Other restaurants also claim to have invented the cheeseburger. For example, Kaelin's Restaurant in Louisville, Kentucky claims they invented the cheeseburger in 1934. One year later, a trademark for the name "cheeseburger" was awarded to Louis Ballast of the Humpty Dumpty Drive-In in Denver, Colorado. According to Steak 'n Shake archives, the restaurant's founder, Gus Belt, applied for a trademark on the word in the 1930s.

Dale Mulder, the owner of an A&W Restaurants franchise in Lansing, Michigan, has been credited with inventing the bacon cheeseburger in 1963, putting it on the menu after repeated requests from the same customer. This was highlighted in a 2014 ad campaign for the chain featuring Mulder, who had since become the president of the A&W chain. However, there are earlier examples of a restaurant selling bacon cheeseburgers, including a menu for a Harrisburg, Pennsylvania restaurant from 1941.

The steamed cheeseburger, a variation almost exclusively served in central Connecticut, is believed to have been invented at a restaurant called Jack's Lunch in Middletown, Connecticut, in the 1930s.

The largest cheeseburger ever made weighed 2,014 pounds (914 kg). It is said to have included "60 pounds (27 kg) of bacon, 50 pounds (23 kg) of lettuce, 50 pounds (23 kg) of sliced onions, 40 pounds (18 kg) of pickles, and 40 pounds (18 kg) of cheese." This record was set in 2012 by Minnesota's Black Bear Casino, smashing the previous record of 881 pounds (400 kg).

In the United States, the made-up holiday "National Cheeseburger Day" occurs annually on September 18.

== Ingredients ==
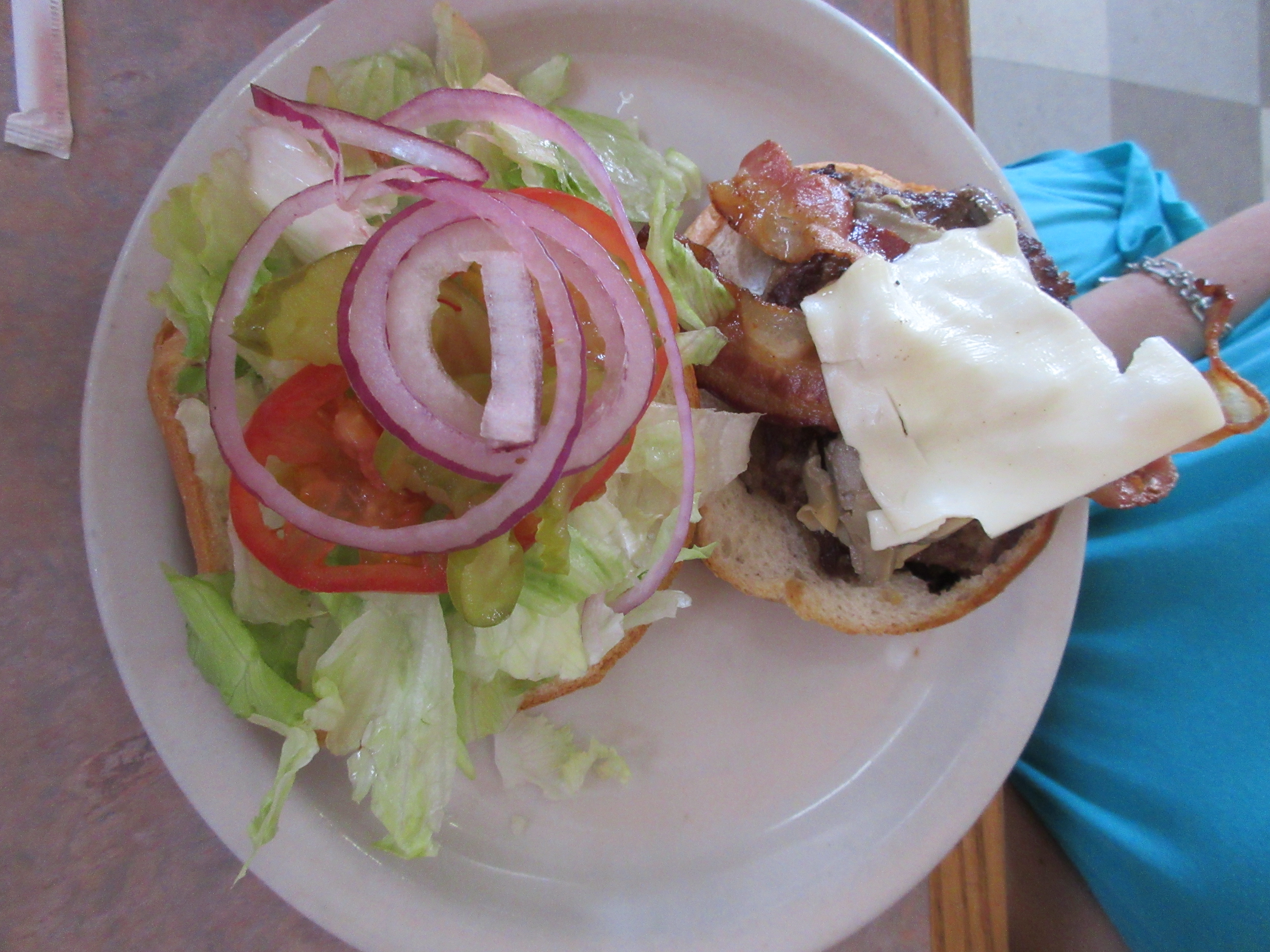
An open cheeseburger showing the burger, cheese slice, salad and onion, as served in a Louisiana diner

The ingredients used to create cheeseburgers follow similar patterns found in the regional variations of hamburgers, although most start with ground beef. Common cheeses used for topping are American, Swiss, Cheddar and other meltable cheeses. Popular toppings include lettuce, tomato, onion, pickles, bacon, avocado or guacamole, sliced sautéed mushrooms, cheese sauce or chili, but the variety of possible toppings is broad.

A cheeseburger may have more than one patty or more than one slice of cheese—it is reasonably common, but by no means automatic, for the number to increase at the same rate with cheese and meat interleaved. A stack of two or more patties follows the same basic pattern as hamburgers: with two patties will be called a double cheeseburger; a triple cheeseburger has three, and while much less common, a quadruple has four.

Sometimes, cheeseburgers are prepared with the cheese enclosed within the ground beef, rather than on top. This is sometimes known as a Jucy Lucy.

Other toppings and condiments may include lettuce, tomato, onion, pickles, bacon, avocado, mushrooms, mayonnaise, ketchup, and mustard.

== Gallery ==
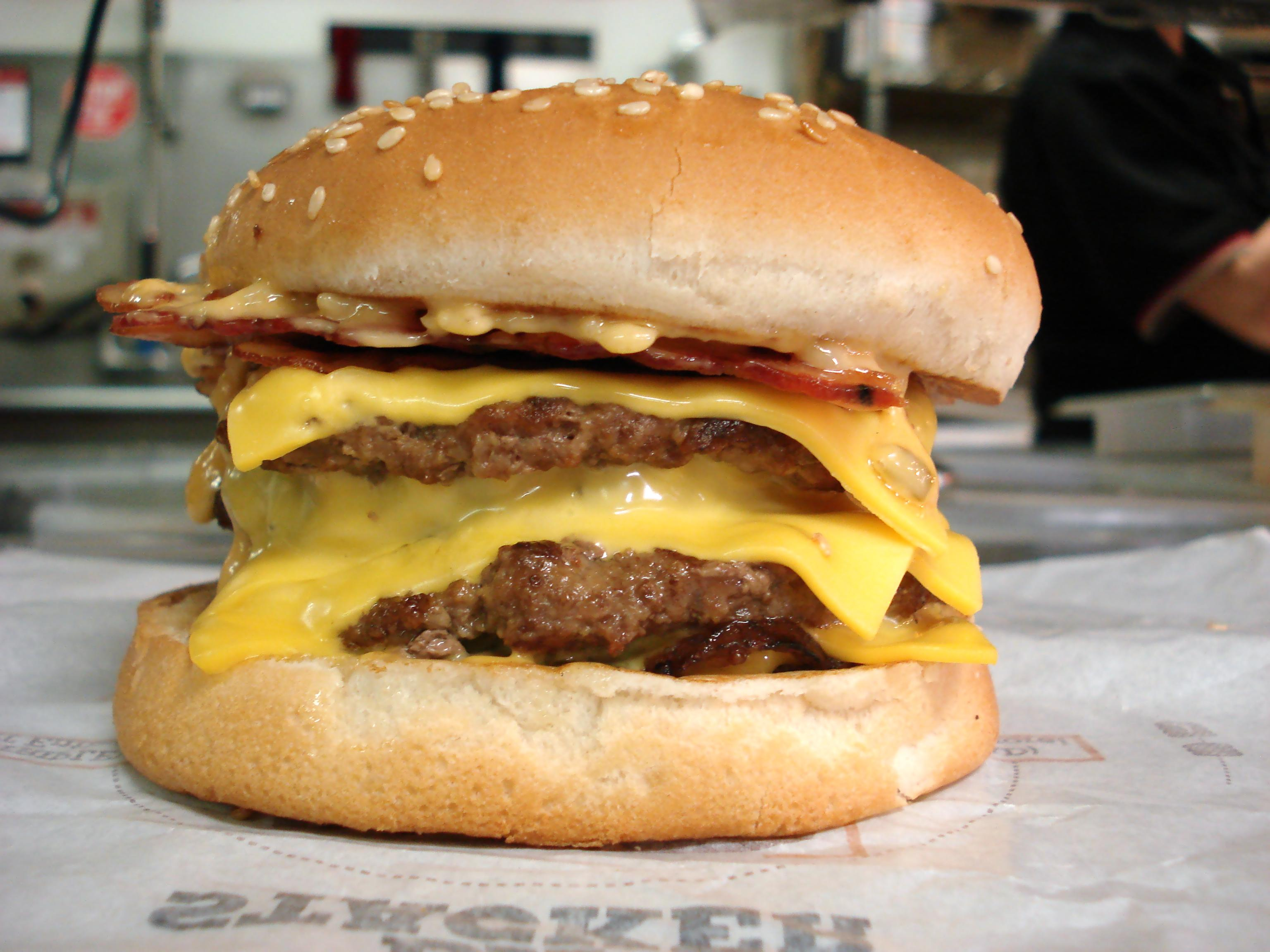
A Burger King "Quad Stacker" cheeseburger, containing four patties and bacon

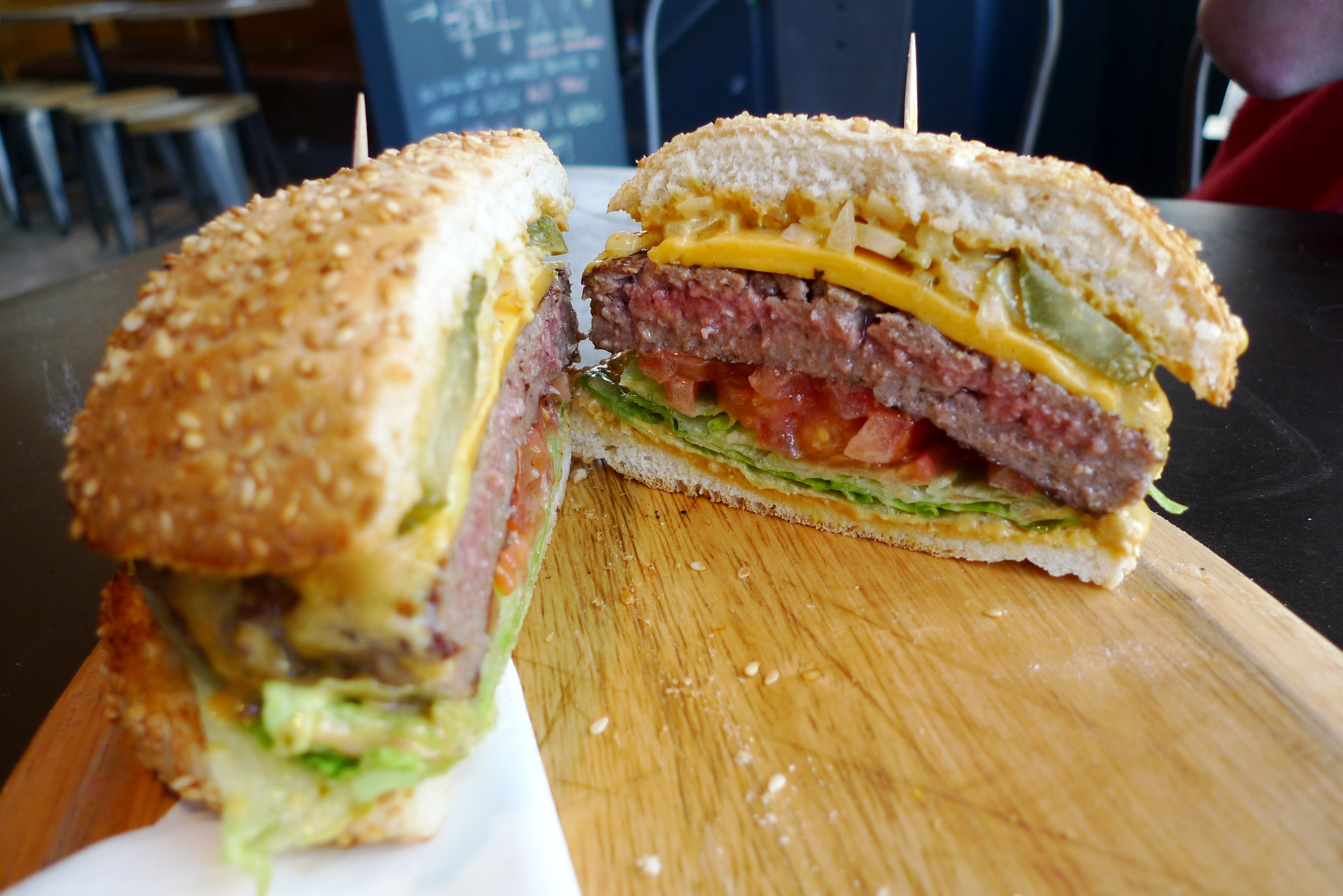
A cheeseburger at a restaurant in Camden Town, London

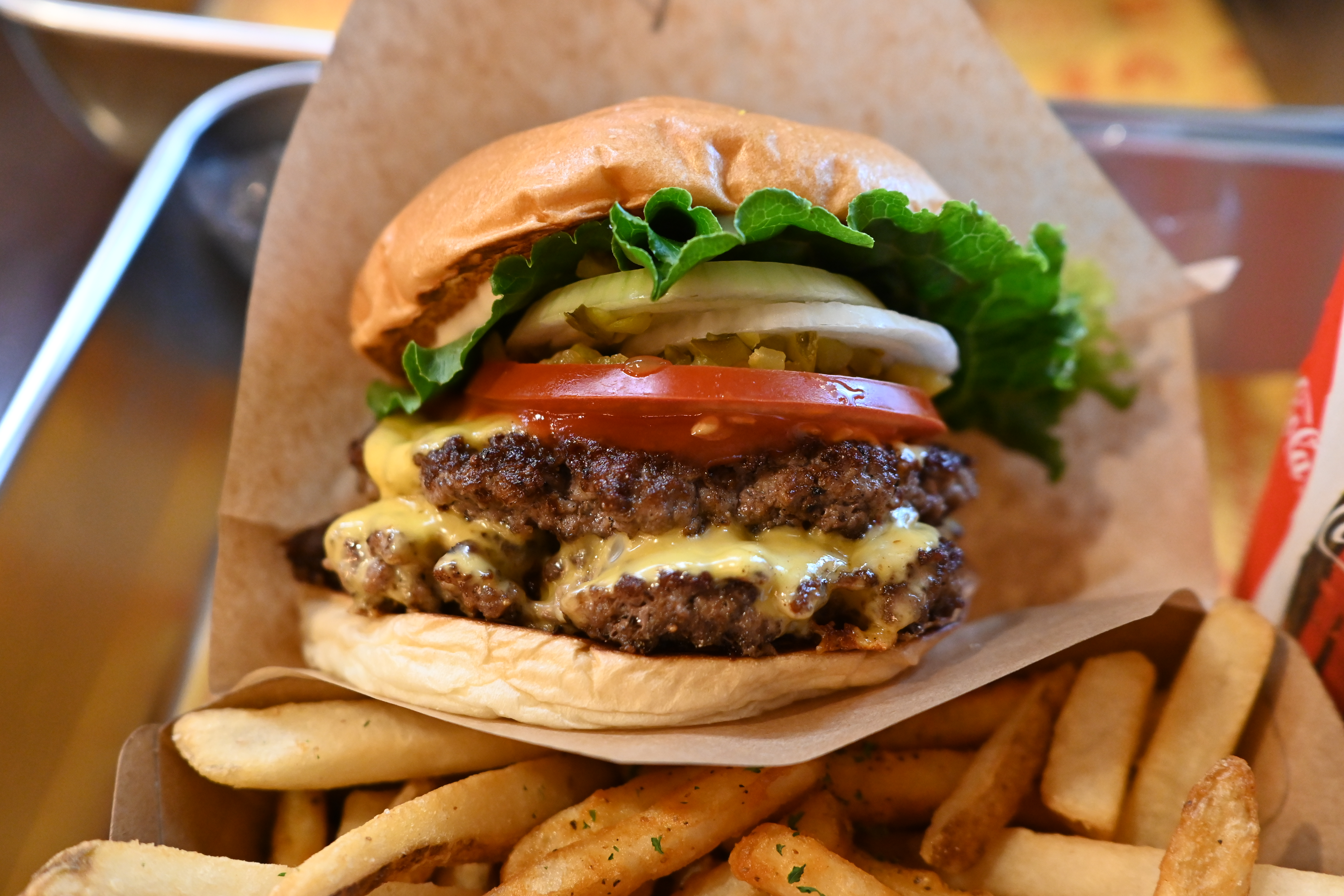
Double cheeseburger

== See also ==
- Hamburger
- Cheeseburger bill
- Cheeseburger in Paradise (disambiguation)
- I Can Has Cheezburger?
- List of hamburgers
- List of hamburger restaurants
- List of sandwiches
- Patty melt
- Slider
- Steamed cheeseburger
