= Alzo Reddick =

American politician

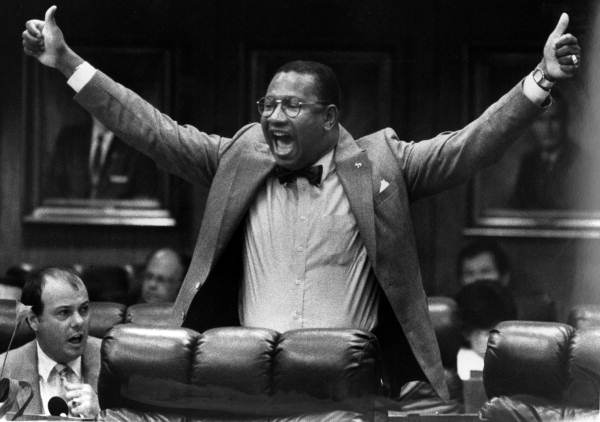
- Alzo Reddick in June 1988

Member of the Florida House of Representatives
- In office November 2, 1982 – November 7, 2000
- Preceded by: Redistricted
- Succeeded by: Gary Siplin
- Constituency: 40th district (1982–1992); 39th district (1992–2000)

Personal details
- Born: November 15, 1937 (age 88)
- Party: Democratic
- Profession: Educator

Alzo J. Reddick is an American who served as a Representative in the Florida House of Representatives of the U.S. state of Florida. He lived in Orlando, Florida, with his family.

He was born November 15, 1937, in Alturas, Florida. Dr. Reddick served his community by founding Soldiers to Scholars. A non-profit associated with the University of Central Florida that paired veteran students with children from under privileged communities. He believed that military veterans serve as role models and hope to provide children with these role models.

== Education ==
He received his master's degree from Florida A&M University, his doctorate degree from Nova University, and another doctorate from the University of Florida. He was the first faculty member, and later assistant Dean of Student Affairs and Co-ordinator of Minority Affairs for Rollins College.

Florida House of Representatives
Preceded by Rich Crotty	Member of the Florida House of Representatives from the 40th district 1982–1992	Succeeded by Bill Sublette
Preceded by Bob Sindler	Member of the Florida House of Representatives from the 39th district 1992–2000	Succeeded by Gary Siplin
