= Bill Sublette =

American politician

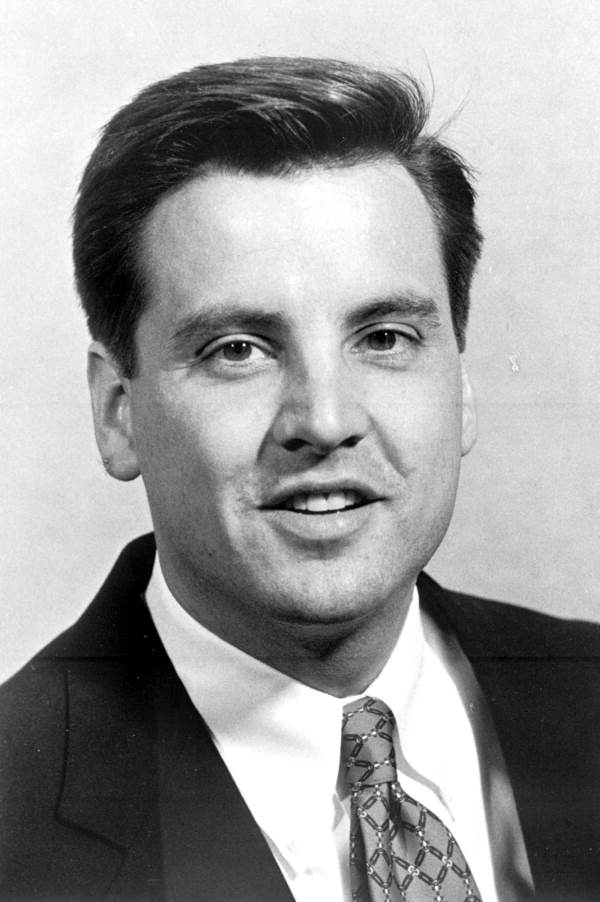

Chair of the Orange County Public School Board
- In office November 16, 2010 – November 19, 2018
- Preceded by: Position established
- Succeeded by: Teresa Jacobs

Member of the Florida House of Representatives from the 40th district
- In office 1992–2000
- Preceded by: Alzo Reddick
- Succeeded by: Andy Gardiner

Personal details
- Born: April 12, 1967 (age 59) Walnut Creek, California, U.S.
- Party: Republican
- Education: University of Florida (BA, JD)
- Profession: Attorney, politician

Bill Sublette is a former Republican member of the Florida House of Representatives from 1993 to 2001.

Sublette was born April 12, 1963, in Walnut Creek, California. In 1985, he graduated from the University of Florida with and B.A. in history, with honors. During that time he served as a Student Government Senator, a member Delta Tau Delta fraternity and a member of the History Honor Society. In 1988, he received his J.D. from the University of Florida.

== Sublette after the Legislature ==
Sublette ran for Florida's 8th Congressional district in 2000. He was defeated in the runoff by Ric Keller, who would later defeat Orange County Chair Linda Chapin in the general election. Sublette continued to seek political office. He ran for Mayor of Orlando in 2003 after Glenda Hood was appointed Secretary of State by Governor Jeb Bush. Sublette finished fourth in the primary.

Sublette has served as Chairman of the Orange County Chairman's Jail Oversight Commission, Chairman of the Mayor's Education Action Council, Co-chair of the Orange County Juvenile Justice Task Force, and most recently as Chairman of the Blue Ribbon Panel on Education, a group of 25 community leaders appointed by the Orange County School Board, City of Orlando, and Orange County government charged with recommending changes to improve the performance of Orange County's public schools.

He currently serves as statewide chairman for No Casinos, Inc., and he is also the President, or an officer, of various community organizations, including public broadcaster WMFE, the Orange County Bar Association, the Central Florida Council-Boy Scouts of America, and the Howard Phillips Center for Children and Families. Sublette was elected in August 2010 to the position of School Board Chairman for Orange County Public Schools.

Florida House of Representatives
Preceded by Alzo Reddick	Member of the Florida House of Representatives from the 40th district 1992–2000	Succeeded by Andy Gardiner
