= Linda Chapin =

American politician (born 1941)

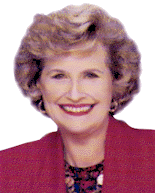

Orange County Clerk of Courts
- In office December 17, 1998 – January 2, 2001
- Preceded by: Fran Carlton
- Succeeded by: Lydia Gardner

1st Chairman of Orange County
- In office November 20, 1990 – November 17, 1998
- Preceded by: Position created
- Succeeded by: Mel Martínez

Member of the Orange County Commission from the 4th district
- In office November 18, 1986 – November 20, 1990
- Preceded by: Bob Harrell
- Succeeded by: Fran Pignone

Personal details
- Born: August 27, 1941 (age 84) Jacksonville, Florida
- Party: Democratic
- Spouse: Bruce Chapin
- Children: 4
- Education: Michigan State University (B.A.)
- Occupation: Banker

Linda Chapin (née Welch; born August 27, 1941) is a Democratic politician from Florida who served as the first Chairman of Orange County from 1990 to 1998. She previously served on the Orange County Commission from the 4th district from 1986 to 1990, and served as the Orange County Clerk of Courts from 1998 to 2001. In 2000, Chapin was the Democratic nominee for Congress from Florida's 8th congressional district.

== Early life and career ==
Linda Welch was born in Jacksonville, Florida, on August 27, 1941. She grew up in Jacksonville while her father, Roger Welch, served in the Army Air Forces in World War II. When her father returned from the war, he was an executive at Chrysler, and her family relocated several times during her childhood, eventually ending up in Detroit. Welch attended Michigan State University, and majored in political science and communications. During her senior year, her father on board Continental Airlines Flight 11 and was killed when the plane crashed.

After graduating from college, Welch moved to New York City and worked at the 1964 New York World's Fair, where she met her husband, Bruce Chapin. They relocated to Florida, and lived in Clearwater while he attended the Stetson University College of Law and she worked as a social worker. In 1968, they moved to Orange County, where she was involved in community activism and worked for a local bank. Chapin served as president of the local League of Women Voters and Junior League, and later became vice president of the bank. She was appointed by Governor Reubin Askew to the Ninth Judicial Circuit Nominating Commission. Governor Bob Graham appointed her as the chairman of the Greater Orlando Aviation Authority, and she was named by the Greater Orlando Chamber of Commerce to run Project 2000, a long-term planning effort to set millennial goals for the city in the areas of economic development, the arts, and transportation

== Orange County Commission ==
In 1986, Chapin ran for the Orange County Commission from the 4th district to succeed Commissioner Bob Harrell, who declined to run for re-election. In the Democratic primary, she defeated real estate agent Gordon Warner, and proceeded to the general election, where she faced former Belle Isle Mayor David Borgon, the Republican nominee. Chapin narrowly defeated Borgon in the general election. She was sworn in on November 18, 1986.

== Chairman of Orange County ==
In 1990, Chapin announced that she would run for Chairman of Orange County in the inaugural election for the position. She won the Democratic primary unopposed, and in the general election, ran against State Representative Tom Drage. Chapin ultimately defeated Drage, winning 53 percent of the vote to his 47 percent.

Chapin originally announced in 1993 that she would not seek a second term the following year. However, she reversed her decision and campaigned for re-election. The 1994 race was conducted as a nonpartisan election, and in the September primary, Chapin was challenged by County Commissioner Fran Pignone, a Democrat and former ally of Chapin's, and former County Commissioner Tom Dorman, who had lost the 1990 Republican primary to Drage. Chapin placed first in the primary with 42 percent of the vote, and advanced to a runoff election with Pignone, who placed second with 31 percent. She defeated Pignone by a wide margin, receiving 61 percent of the vote to Pignone's 39 percent.

During Chapin's first term as Chairman, she successfully pushed to acquire the music library of the defunct Florida Philharmonic Orchestra in 1993. After the Orlando Philharmonic Orchestra was established, the library was transferred to it. The music library was subsequently named for Chapin in 2015. She was allied with several prominent Orlando-area women, including Mayor Glenda Hood, State Senator Toni Jennings, and Disney executive Dianna Fuller Morgan, forming an "old-girl network." In 1996, Chapin led the county commission in approving a $53 million subsidy to build a fourth interchange for Walt Disney World on Interstate 4. This spending later sparked a public outcry when it emerged that the construction project would not be located in Orange County but in neighboring Osceola County. Chapin justified the subsidy by arguing that Disney's billion dollar investment in constructing its Animal Kingdom theme park and the Coronado Springs and Boardwalk resorts would generate tax dollars for Orange County.

In 1998, Chapin was term-limited and succeeded by Republican Mel Martínez.

== Orange County Clerk of Courts ==
After Chapin left office, Orange County Clerk of Courts Fran Carlton announced that she would resign from office to spend time with her family. Governor Buddy MacKay appointed Chapin to serve out the remainder of Carlton's term, which expired in 2001.

== 2000 congressional campaign ==
When Republican Congressman Bill McCollum ran for the U.S. Senate rather than seek re-election, Chapin ran to succeed him in the 8th district. She won the Democratic primary unopposed and faced Republican Ric Keller, an attorney, in the general election. The race attracted national attention as a pickup opportunity for the Democratic Party given Chapin's popularity and fundraising strength. Chapin attacked Keller for his support of the National Rifle Association, while Keller attacked Chapin for "raising taxes for wasteful spending projects," like an $18,500 frog sculpture.

Following a close campaign, Keller narrowly defeated Chapin, winning 51 percent of the vote to her 49 percent.

== Subsequent career ==
After leaving office, Chapin served as the director of the Metropolitan Center for Regional Studies at the University of Central Florida from 2001 to 2008. In 2007, she was named by Ninth Judicial Circuit Chief Judge Belvin Perry as the chair of the Orange County Task Force on Ethics and Campaign Finance Reform, which recommended strengthening the county's financial disclosure requirements by requiring local political candidates to disclose their final campaign contributions one week before election day.

== Personal life ==
Chapin's son, Roger Chapin, unsuccessfully ran for the Orlando City Council in 2002, and was defeated by incumbent Councilwoman Vicki Vargo, but was elected in 2025.
