= Cheeseburger in Paradise =

Cheeseburger in Paradise may refer to:

- "Cheeseburger in Paradise" (song), a 1978 song by Jimmy Buffett
- Cheeseburger in Paradise (restaurant) (2002–2014), a defunct American restaurant chain
