= 1994 Orange County, Florida Chairman election =

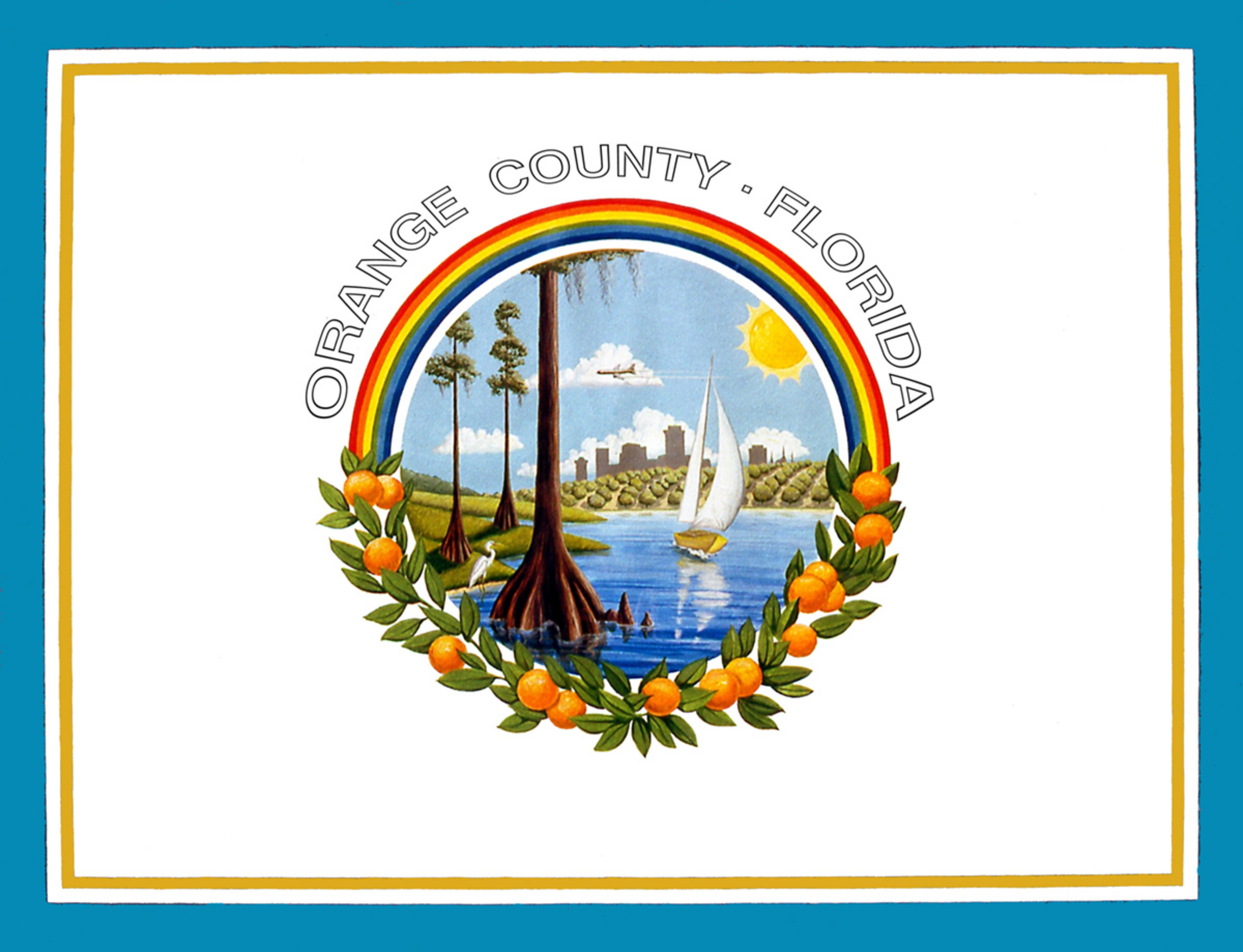
- September 8, 1994; November 8, 1994
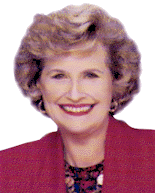

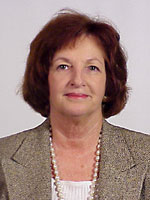

| Candidate | Linda Chapin | Fran Pignone | Tom Dorman |
| First round | 34,119; 41.83% | 25,291; 31.01% | 22,148; 27.16% |
| Runoff | 102,603; 60.56% | 66,829; 39.44% | Eliminated |
Chairman before election
Linda Chapin
Nonpartisan
Elected Chairman
Linda Chapin
Nonpartisan

The 1994 Orange County, Florida, Chairman election took place on November 8, 1994, following a primary election on September 8, 1994. Incumbent County Chairman Linda Chapin, who was first elected in 1990, ran for re-election to a second term. Chapin originally announced on November 5, 1993, that she would not seek re-election, but reconsidered the decision and launched her re-election campaign on April 7, 1994.

Following a 1992 amendment to the Orange County Charter, elections for Chairman were conducted as nonpartisan races, with all candidates appearing on the primary election ballot, and a runoff election taking place if no candidate received a majority of the vote.

Two candidates ran against Chapin: County Commissioner Fran Pignone and former County Commissioner Tom Dorman. In the primary election, Chapin placed first, winning 42 percent of the vote. Pignone, a Democrat, placed second with 31 percent. In the general election, Chapin won re-election in a landslide, defeating Pignone with 61 percent of the vote.

== Primary election ==
=== Candidates ===
- Linda Chapin, incumbent Chairman (Democratic)
- Fran Pignone, Orange County Commissioner (Democratic)
- Tom Dorman, former Orange County Commissioner (Republican)

==== Dropped out ====
- Darcy Bone, former Mayor of Maitland (Republican)

=== Results ===
1994 Orange County, Florida, Chairman primary election
| Party | Candidate | Votes | % |
|---|---|---|---|
| Nonpartisan | Linda Chapin (inc.) | 34,119 | 41.83% |
| Nonpartisan | Fran Pignone | 25,291 | 31.01% |
| Nonpartisan | Tom Dorman | 22,148 | 27.16% |
| Total votes | | 81,558 | 100.00% |

== General election ==
=== Results ===
1994 Orange County, Florida, Chairman general election
| Party | Candidate | Votes | % |
|---|---|---|---|
| Nonpartisan | Linda Chapin (inc.) | 102,603 | 60.56% |
| Nonpartisan | Fran Pignone | 66,829 | 39.44% |
| Total votes | | 169,432 | 100.00% |
