= Ric Keller =

American politician (born 1964)

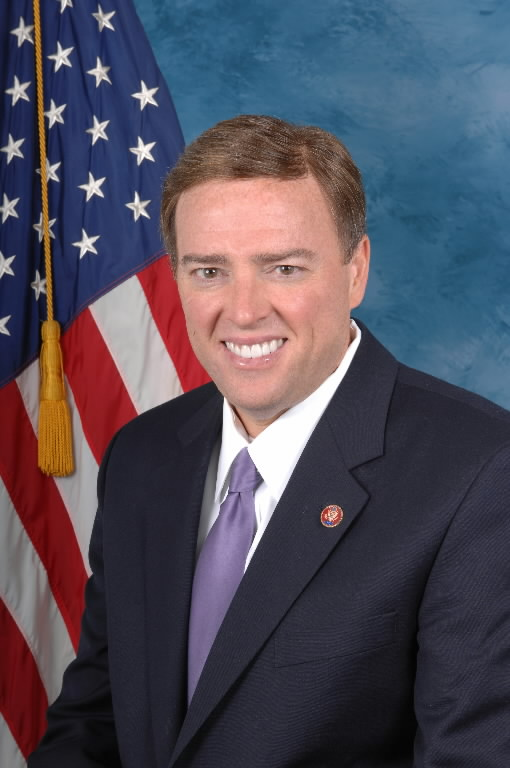

Member of the U.S. House of Representatives from Florida's 8th district
- In office January 3, 2001 – January 3, 2009
- Preceded by: Bill McCollum
- Succeeded by: Alan Grayson

Personal details
- Born: Richard Anthony Keller; September 5, 1964 (age 61) Johnson City, Tennessee, U.S.
- Party: Republican
- Spouse: Lori Spivey
- Children: 5
- Education: East Tennessee State University (BA); Vanderbilt University (JD); Harvard University
- Website: Official website

Richard Anthony Keller (born September 5, 1964) is an American politician, author, and lawyer who served as the U.S. representative for Florida's 8th congressional district from 2001 to 2009. His district included much of the Central Florida region including the Greater Orlando metropolitan area and Walt Disney World. He chaired the House Subcommittee on Higher Education and served on the Judiciary and Education committees. Today he is an author, speaker, TV commentator and attorney.

== Personal information ==
Keller was born in Johnson City, Tennessee. He received a bachelor's degree from East Tennessee State University, where he graduated first in his class in 1986, and a J.D. degree from Vanderbilt University in 1992. He was a lawyer in Florida before being elected to the House of Representatives in 2000.

Keller served eight years in the U.S. House of Representatives. He chaired the House Higher Education subcommittee served on the Judiciary and Education committees. Keller is now a partner at law firm of Hill, Rugh, Keller & Main, P.L. in Orlando, Fla. He lives in Winter Park, Florida with his wife, Lori, and their blended family. In 2025, Keller enrolled in a one year Masters in Religion and Public Life program at Harvard University.

== Committee assignments ==
- Committee on Education and the Workforce
  - Early Childhood, Elementary, and Secondary Education
  - Subcommittee on higher education, workforce development and lifelong learning (chairman and Ranking Member)
- Committee on the Judiciary
  - Subcommittee on Courts, the Internet, and Intellectual Property
  - Subcommittee on Commercial and Administrative Law
  - Antitrust Task Force and Competition Policy

== Congressional campaigns ==
=== 2000 ===
In Keller's first run for Congress, he finished in second place in the Republican primary with 31% of the vote, against fellow Republican Bill Sublette, who had 43%, but defeated Sublette in the runoff election, getting 52% of that vote.

In the 2000 general election, Keller won with 51% of the vote against Democrat Linda Chapin.

=== 2002 ===
Keller readily won the 2002 Congressional election against Democrat Eddie Diaz, winning with 65% of the vote.

=== 2004 ===
In 2004 Keller won his third term with 60% of the vote against Democratic challenger Stephen Murray.

=== 2006 ===
In 2006, Keller won the Republican primary with 72% of the vote, defeating businesswoman Elizabeth Doran. In the general election, Keller defeated Democrat Charlie Stuart, 53% to 46%.

=== 2008 ===
In 2008, Keller won the Republican primary defeating attorney Todd Long 53% to 47%, but lost the general election 48% to 52% to Democrat Alan Grayson when the GOP presidential nominee John McCain lost the district 47% to 52% to Democrat Barack Obama.

== Political positions ==
=== Food liability ===
In 2003, Keller introduced the Personal Responsibility in Food Consumption Act. The act "dismisses pending civil actions by any person against a manufacturer or seller of food or a trade association for any injury resulting from a person's consumption of food and weight gain, obesity, or any associated health condition". Keller received over $300,000 from the Food & Beverage Industry throughout his career.

== Book ==
Keller, Ric (2022) Chase the Bears: Little Things to Achieve Big Dreams, Health Communications Inc., ISBN 978-0757324482

U.S. House of Representatives
Preceded by Bill McCollum	Member of the U.S. House of Representatives from Florida's 8th congressional district 2001–2009	Succeeded by Alan Grayson
U.S. order of precedence (ceremonial)
Preceded by Charles Canady as Former U.S. Representative	Order of precedence of the United States as Former U.S. Representative	Succeeded by Ginny Brown-Waite as Former U.S. Representative
