= Personal Responsibility in Food Consumption Act =

Proposed US legislation

The 2005 American Personal Responsibility in Food Consumption Act (H.R. 554), also known as the Cheeseburger Bill, sought to protect producers and retailers of foods—such as McDonald's from an increasing number of suits and class action suits by obese consumers. The Act stated that food-producing or retailing corporations cannot be legally held responsible for obesity, heart disease, or other health-related issues caused by consumption of their food, save for situations where actual food quality or handling was held responsible for such issues. To date these suits have been turned down by the courts, sometimes in strong terms. The Act never became a law.

The Act was passed by the U.S. House of Representatives on 10 March 2004, but did not receive a Senate vote.

The bill was reintroduced in 2005 by Florida Republican Congressman Ric Keller. Keller had taken the maximum level of PAC donations up to $300,000 for his personal campaign funding from restaurants including McDonald's, Wendy's, and Burger King. On October 19, 2005, it passed the House with a 306–120 vote, but again failed to achieve a Senate vote.

Many state legislatures have considered their own versions of the bill.
