= Tom Drage =

American politician

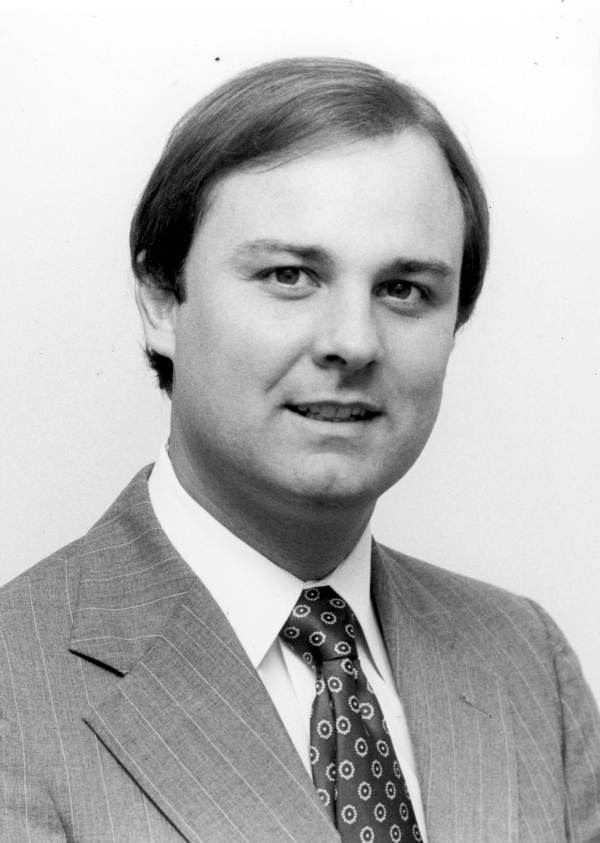

Member of the Florida House of Representatives
- In office 1980–1990

Personal details
- Born: Thomas Drage; December 19, 1948 (age 77) Jacksonville, Florida, U.S.
- Party: Republican
- Education: Florida State University; Stetson University
- Occupation: Attorney

Thomas B. Drage, Jr. (born December 19, 1948) is a former American politician who represented the state of Florida.

Drage was born in Fort Myers and is an attorney. He served in the Florida House of Representatives for the 47th district from 1980 to 1990, as a Republican.
