= Michael Bilirakis =

American politician (born 1930)

Mike Bilirakis
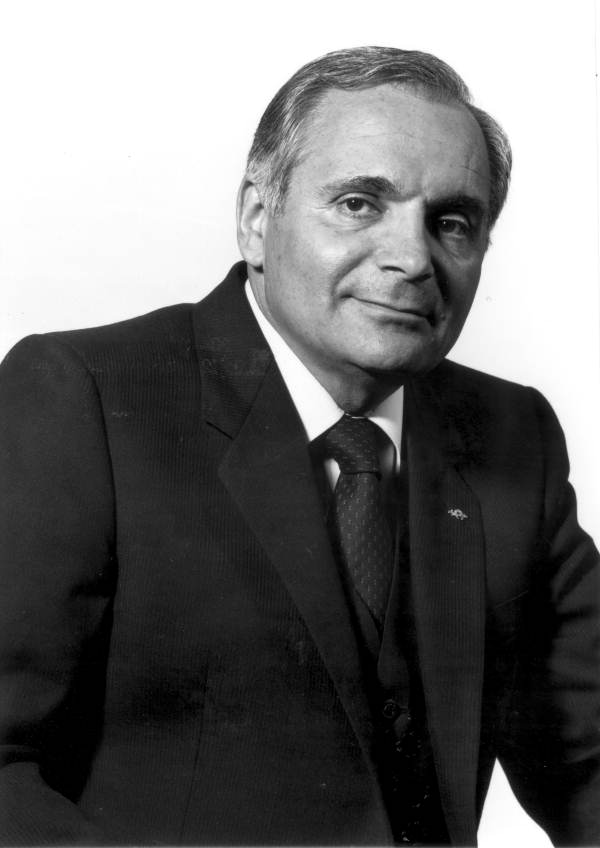
- Bilirakis in 1982

Member of the U.S. House of Representatives from Florida's 9th district
- In office January 3, 1983 – January 3, 2007
- Preceded by: Constituency reestablished
- Succeeded by: Gus Bilirakis

Personal details
- Born: July 16, 1930 (age 96) Tarpon Springs, Florida, U.S.
- Party: Republican
- Spouse: Evelyn Bilirakis
- Children: Gus
- Education: University of Pittsburgh (BS); University of Florida (JD)

Michael Bilirakis (born July 16, 1930) is an American politician and lawyer from Florida. A member of the Republican Party, he served as a member of the United States House of Representatives from 1983 to 2007, representing Florida's 9th congressional district.

== Early life ==
The son of Greek immigrants, Bilirakis was born in Tarpon Springs, Florida but spent his childhood in Clairton, Pennsylvania. He graduated from Douglas Business College in McKeesport, Pennsylvania in 1949. He received his bachelor's degree from the University of Pittsburgh in 1959 where he was a member of Sigma Pi fraternity. He also attended George Washington University in 1960. He earned a Juris Doctor degree from the University of Florida Levin College of Law in 1963. Bilirakis served in the United States Air Force from 1951 to 1955 during the Korean War era and rose to the rank of staff sergeant.

== Political career ==
Bilirakis made his first run for office in 1982, contesting the newly created 9th District. He defeated State Representative George Sheldon by 4,300 votes. He was reelected with 78 percent of the vote in 1984 and was reelected 10 more times, never facing serious opposition. He ran unopposed in 1988, 1994, 1998 and 2004.

His committee assignments include membership on the Energy and Commerce Committee as well as being vice chairman of the Veterans' Affairs Committee. He played a key role in enactment of the Public Health Security and Bioterrorism Preparedness and Response Act and re-authorization of the Prescription Drug User Fee Act. He was the lead congressional sponsor of The Nurse Reinvestment Act of 2002 and authored the Organ Donation Improvement Act. National Journal's Almanac of American Politics called him one of the most "legislatively productive" members of Congress.

=== Retirement and later life ===
Bilirakis retired in 2006. His son, Gus, a Florida state representative, defeated Democrat Phyllis Busansky in the 2006 congressional race for the elder Bilirakis's House seat. In August 2009, Bilirakis was shortlisted by Governor Crist as a potential replacement for Mel Martínez after his resignation from the U.S. Senate. Crist ultimately appointed George LeMieux.

U.S. House of Representatives
Preceded by Bill Nelson	Member of the U.S. House of Representatives from Florida's 9th congressional district 1983–2007	Succeeded by Gus Bilirakis
U.S. order of precedence (ceremonial)
Preceded by Don Fuqua as Former U.S. Representative	Order of precedence of the United States as Former U.S. Representative	Succeeded by Cliff Stearns as Former U.S. Representative
