= USF Health Byrd Alzheimer's Institute =

Disease research center in Florida, United States

Coordinates: 28.068338°N 82.417695°W

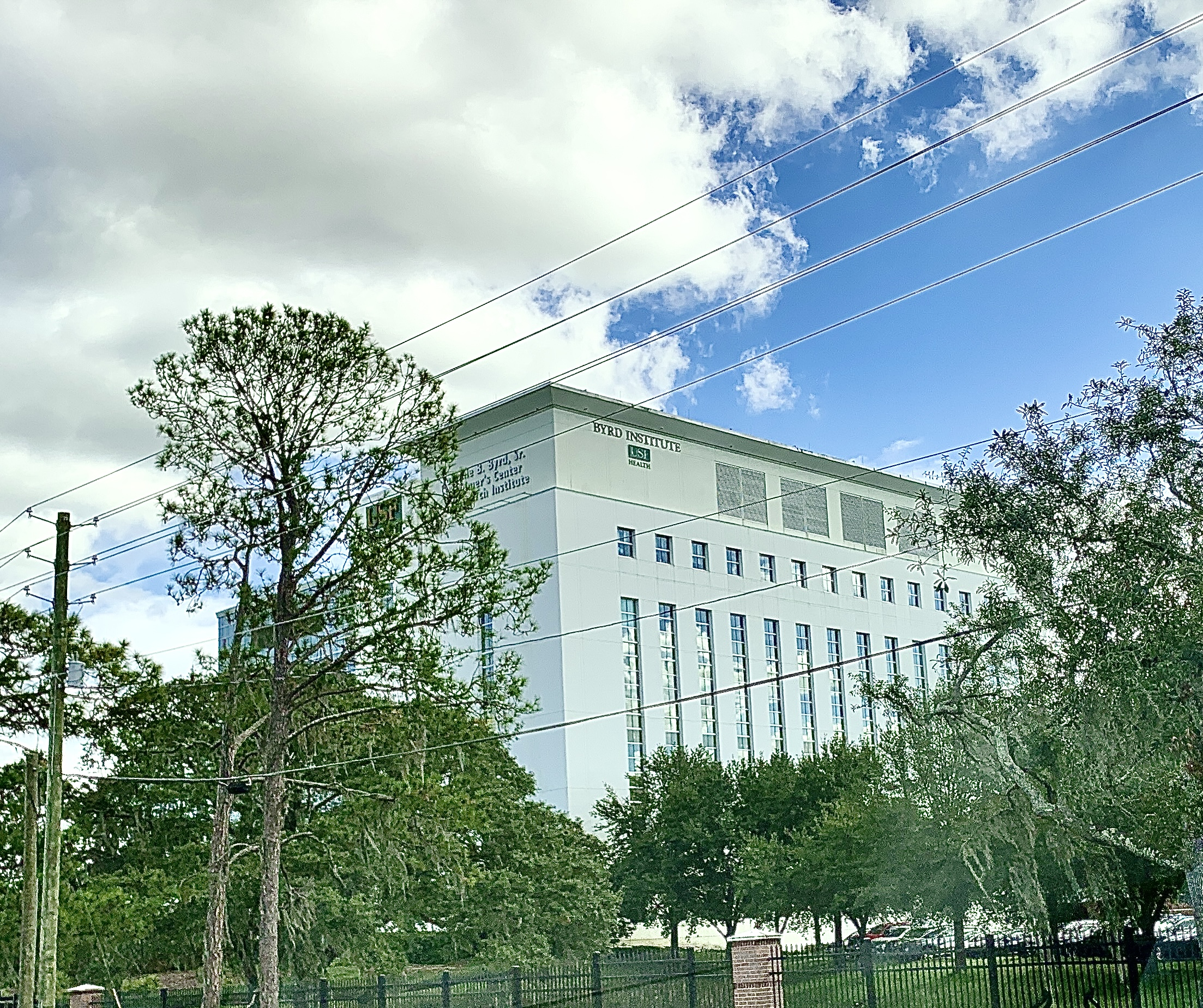
Exterior view

The USF Health Byrd Alzheimer's Institute is an Alzheimer's disease research center based in Tampa, Florida. The center was founded on July 1, 2002 as an independent, state-funded facility on the vision of former Florida Speaker of the House Johnnie Byrd, whose father suffered from the disease. Today, the Institute is a multi-disciplinary center at the University of South Florida and the world’s largest freestanding diagnostic facility providing comprehensive memory care services in one location.
