= 2006 United States House of Representatives elections in Florida =

- November 7, 2006

All 25 Florida seats to the United States House of Representatives
	Majority party	Minority party
Party	Republican	Democratic
Last election	18	7
Seats won	16	9
Seat change	▼2	▲2
Popular vote	2,182,833	1,599,968
Percentage	56.67%	41.54%
Swing	▼2.31%	▲2.23%

Republican
40–50%
50–60%
60–70%
70–80%
Democratic
40–50%
50–60%
60–70%
90>%

The 2006 United States House of Representatives Elections in Florida took place on November 7, 2006. Elections were held in Florida's 1st through 25th congressional districts.

Florida is known to be a moderate-to-conservative state, with more liberals residing in South Florida, and moderates and conservatives dominating both the northern and central regions of Florida, as well as a strong Republican base in Cuban-American portions of Miami. Katherine Harris, a former Florida Secretary of State made famous in the 2000 presidential election, challenged incumbent senator Bill Nelson, and ended up losing to Nelson. Democrats set their sights on two districts in the Sarasota and Tampa area (the open seats of both Harris and the retiring Mike Bilirakis, respectively), and also on a South Florida district held by one of the Sunshine State's longest-serving congressmen.

The primary was held on September 5, 2006. The popularity of outgoing governor Jeb Bush aided their gubernatorial candidate, Attorney General Charlie Crist and helped Republicans win downballot, including Crist's newly elected successor at the Attorney General position, former Rep. Bill McCollum.

== Overview ==
United States House of Representatives elections in Florida, 2006
Party	Votes	Percentage	Seats	+/–
Republican	2,182,833	56.67%	16	-2
Democratic	1,599,968	41.54%	9	+2
Independents	69,141	1.79%	0	—
Totals	3,851,942	100.00%	25	—

== District 1 ==
2006 Florida's 1st congressional district election
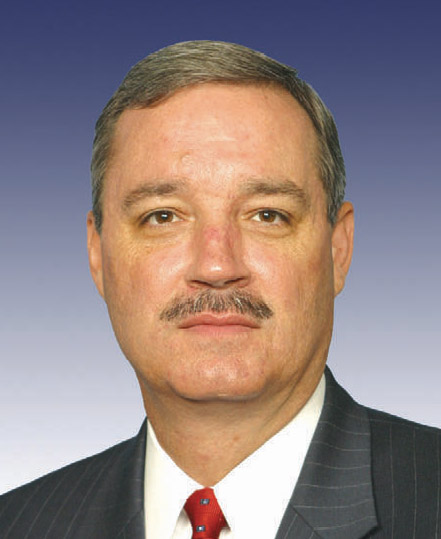

Nominee	Jeff Miller	Joe Roberts
Party	Republican	Democratic
Popular vote	135,786	62,340
Percentage	68.5%	31.5%
- County results Miller: 50–60% 60–70% 70–80%
U.S. Representative before election
Jeff Miller
Republican
Elected U.S. Representative
Jeff Miller
Republican

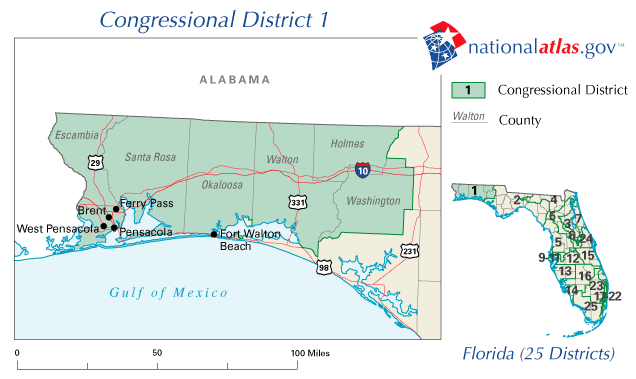

Three-term Republican incumbent congressman Jeff Miller had an easy time seeking re-election in this conservative district based in the Florida Panhandle. Miller, who was initially elected in a special election in 2001 to replace Joe Scarborough, took advantage of this district's large military population based around the Naval Air Station Pensacola with his membership on the House Veterans Affairs Committee and the naturally conservative tendencies of western Florida to defeat Democratic challenger Joe Roberts easily.

=== Predictions ===
Source	Ranking	As of
The Cook Political Report	Safe R	November 6, 2006
Rothenberg	Safe R	November 6, 2006
Sabato's Crystal Ball	Safe R	November 6, 2006
Real Clear Politics	Safe R	November 7, 2006
CQ Politics	Safe R	November 7, 2006

Florida's 1st congressional district election, 2006
Party	Candidate	Votes	%
Republican	Jeff Miller (incumbent)	135,786	68.54
Democratic	Joe Roberts	62,340	31.46
Total votes		198,126	100.00
Republican hold			

== District 2 ==
2006 Florida's 2nd congressional district election
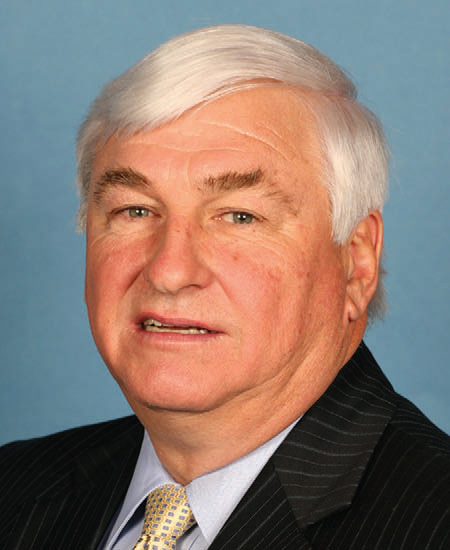
Nominee	Allen Boyd
Party	Democratic
Popular vote	Unopposed
Percentage
U.S. Representative before election
Allen Boyd
Democratic
Elected U.S. Representative
Allen Boyd
Democratic

=== Predictions ===
Source	Ranking	As of
The Cook Political Report	Safe D	November 6, 2006
Rothenberg	Safe D	November 6, 2006
Sabato's Crystal Ball	Safe D	November 6, 2006
Real Clear Politics	Safe D	November 7, 2006
CQ Politics	Safe D	November 7, 2006

Results

Florida's 2nd congressional district election, 2006
Party	Candidate	Votes	%
Democratic	Allen Boyd	Unopposed	

== District 3 ==
2006 Florida's 3rd congressional district election
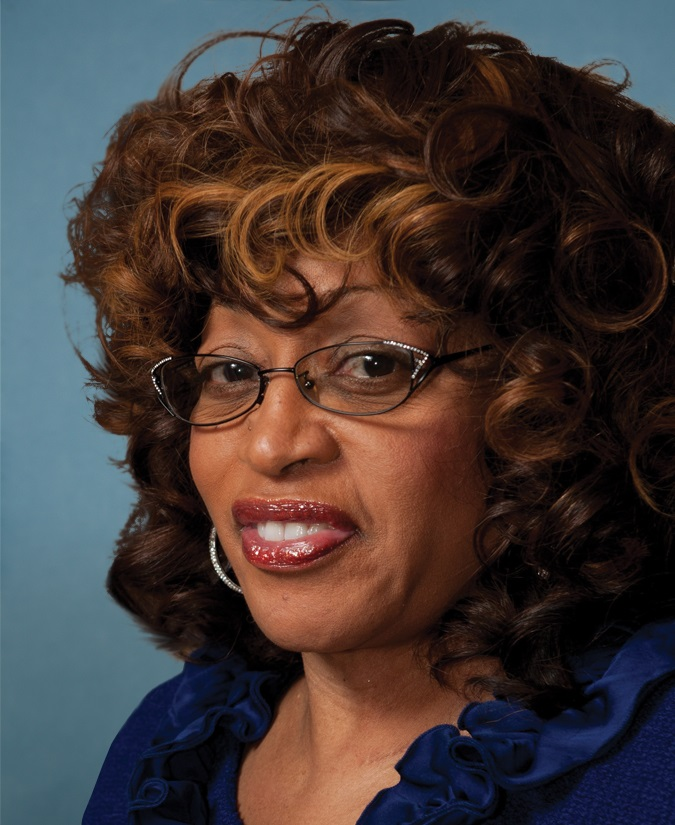
Nominee	Corrine Brown
Party	Democratic
Popular vote	Unopposed
Percentage
U.S. Representative before election
Corrine Brown
Democratic
Elected U.S. Representative
Corrine Brown
Democratic

=== Predictions ===
Source	Ranking	As of
The Cook Political Report	Safe D	November 6, 2006
Rothenberg	Safe D	November 6, 2006
Sabato's Crystal Ball	Safe D	November 6, 2006
Real Clear Politics	Safe D	November 7, 2006
CQ Politics	Safe D	November 7, 2006

Results

Florida's 3rd congressional district election, 2006
Party	Candidate	Votes	%
Democratic	Corrine Brown	Unopposed	

== District 4 ==
2006 Florida's 4th congressional district election
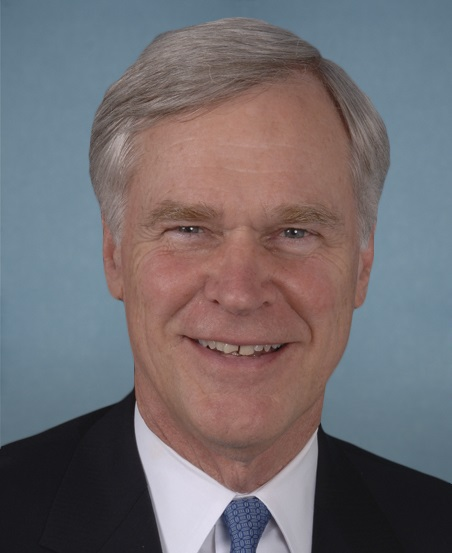

Nominee	Ander Crenshaw	Robert J. Harms
Party	Republican	Democratic
Popular vote	141,759	61,704
Percentage	69.7%	30.3%
- County results Crenshaw: 50–60% 60–70% 70–80% Harms: 50–60% 60–70%
U.S. Representative before election
Ander Crenshaw
Republican
Elected U.S. Representative
Ander Crenshaw
Republican

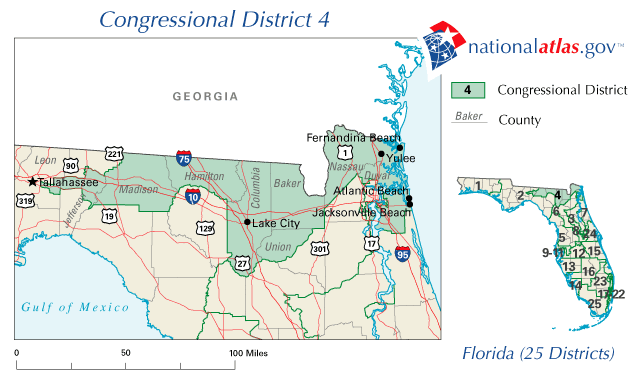

Incumbent Republican congressman Ander Crenshaw represented this North Florida and Jacksonville-based district since 2001.Crenshaw was re-elected with nearly 70% of the vote.

=== Predictions ===
Source	Ranking	As of
The Cook Political Report	Safe R	November 6, 2006
Rothenberg	Safe R	November 6, 2006
Sabato's Crystal Ball	Safe R	November 6, 2006
Real Clear Politics	Safe R	November 7, 2006
CQ Politics	Safe R	November 7, 2006

Florida's 4th congressional district election, 2006
Party	Candidate	Votes	%
Republican	Ander Crenshaw (incumbent)	141,759	69.67
Democratic	Robert J. Harms	61,704	30.32
Write-ins		16	0.01
Total votes		203,479	100.00
Republican hold			

== District 5 ==
2006 Florida's 5th congressional district election
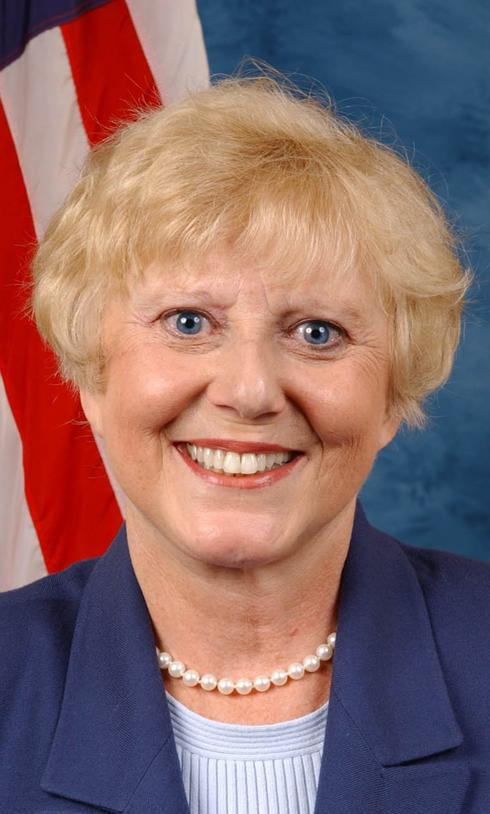

Nominee	Ginny Brown-Waite	John Russell
Party	Republican	Democratic
Popular vote	162,421	108,959
Percentage	59.9%	40.1%
- County results Brown-waite: 50–60% 60–70%
U.S. Representative before election
Ginny Brown-Waite
Republican
Elected U.S. Representative
Ginny Brown-Waite
Republican

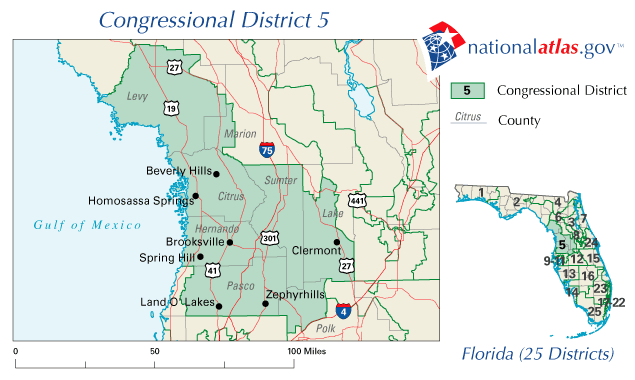

Incumbent Republican congressman Ginny Brown-Waite faced challenger John Russell. She was re-elected to a third term with nearly 60% of the vote.

=== Predictions ===
Source	Ranking	As of
The Cook Political Report	Safe R	November 6, 2006
Rothenberg	Safe R	November 6, 2006
Sabato's Crystal Ball	Safe R	November 6, 2006
Real Clear Politics	Safe R	November 7, 2006
CQ Politics	Safe R	November 7, 2006

Florida's 5th congressional district election, 2006
Party	Candidate	Votes	%
Republican	Ginny Brown-Waite (incumbent)	162,421	59.85
Democratic	John Russell	108,959	40.15
Total votes		271,380	100.00
Republican hold			

== District 6 ==
2006 Florida's 6th congressional district election
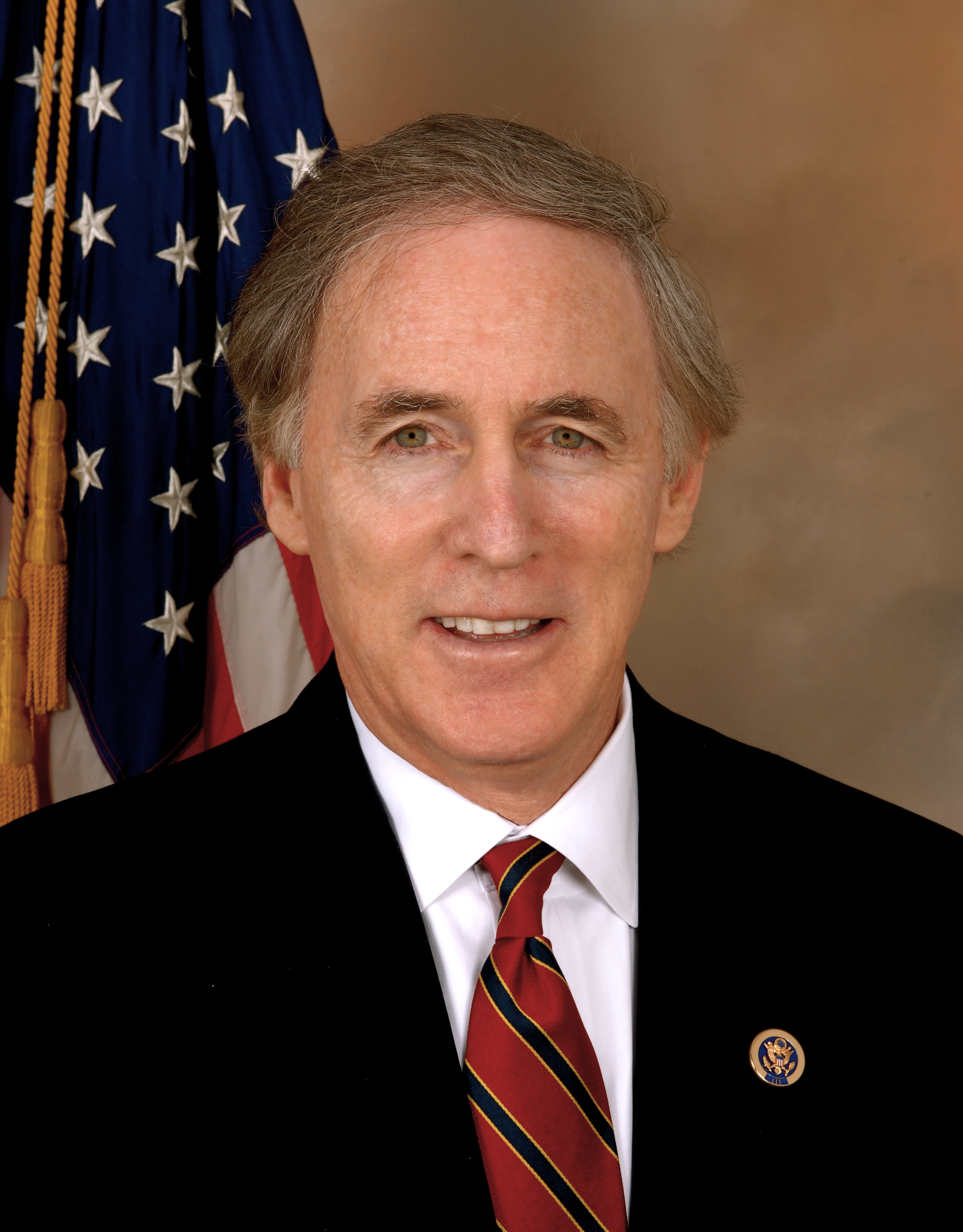

Nominee	Cliff Stearns	David E. Bruderly
Party	Republican	Democratic
Popular vote	136,601	91,528
Percentage	59.9%	40.1%
- County results Stearns: 50–60% 60–70% 70–80% Bruderly: 50–60%
U.S. Representative before election
Cliff Stearns
Republican
Elected U.S. Representative
Cliff Stearns
Republican

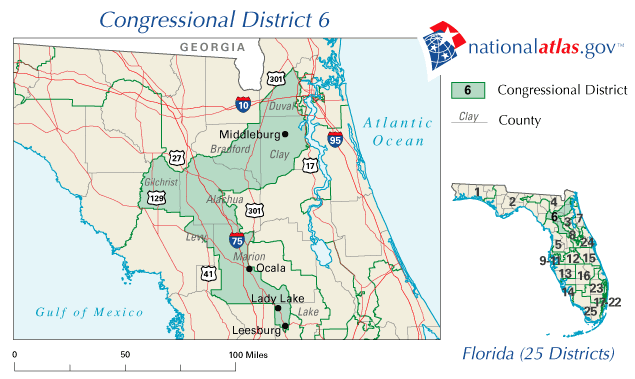

Encompassing North Central Florida, this conservative district is represented by nine-term incumbent Republican congressman Cliff Stearns. Stearns, seeking a tenth term, faced off against Democratic candidate David Bruderly. Though Stearns defeated Bruderly by a wide margin, it was not the margin of victory that Stearns is used to in this gerrymandered district.

=== Predictions ===
Source	Ranking	As of
The Cook Political Report	Safe R	November 6, 2006
Rothenberg	Safe R	November 6, 2006
Sabato's Crystal Ball	Safe R	November 6, 2006
Real Clear Politics	Safe R	November 7, 2006
CQ Politics	Safe R	November 7, 2006

Florida's 6th congressional district election, 2006
Party	Candidate	Votes	%
Republican	Cliff Stearns (incumbent)	136,601	59.88
Democratic	David E. Bruderly	91,528	40.12
Total votes		228,129	100.00
Republican hold			

== District 7 ==
2006 Florida's 7th congressional district election
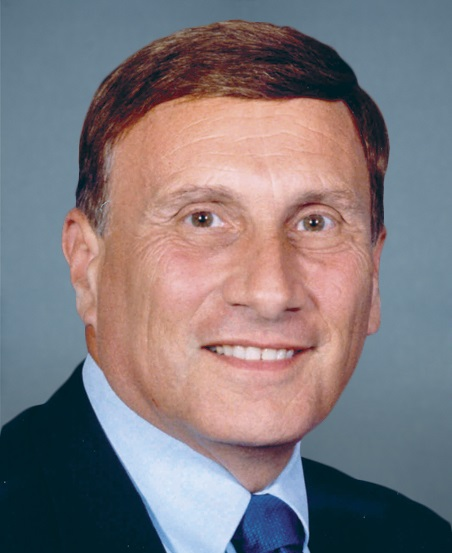

Nominee	John Mica	John F. Chagnon
Party	Republican	Democratic
Popular vote	149,656	87,584
Percentage	63.1%	36.9%
- County results Mica: 50–60% 60–70% 70–80%
U.S. Representative before election
John Mica
Republican
Elected U.S. Representative
John Mica
Republican

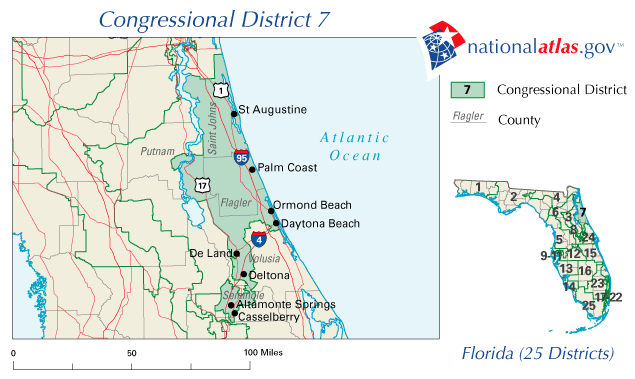

Incumbent Republican congressman John Mica, initially elected in 1992, sought his eighth term in this conservative district that stretches along the coast of Florida from St. Augustine to Daytona Beach and peeks into the Orlando Metropolitan Area. Mica defeated Democratic candidate John Chagnon in a landslide.

=== Predictions ===
Source	Ranking	As of
The Cook Political Report	Safe R	November 6, 2006
Rothenberg	Safe R	November 6, 2006
Sabato's Crystal Ball	Safe R	November 6, 2006
Real Clear Politics	Safe R	November 7, 2006
CQ Politics	Safe R	November 7, 2006

Florida's 7th congressional district election, 2006
Party	Candidate	Votes	%
Republican	John Mica (incumbent)	149,656	63.08
Democratic	John F. Chagnon	87,584	36.92
Total votes		237,240	100.00
Republican hold			

== District 8 ==
2006 Florida's 8th congressional district election
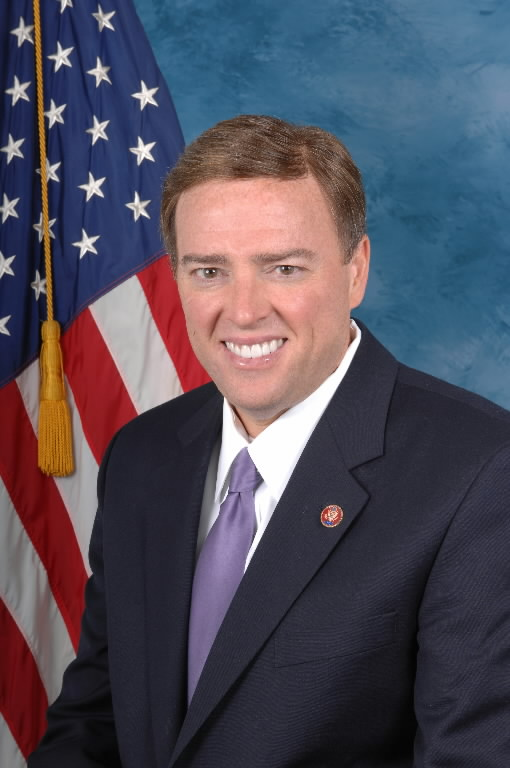

Nominee	Ric Keller	Charlie Stuart
Party	Republican	Democratic
Popular vote	95,258	82,526
Percentage	52.8%	45.7%
- County results Keller: 50–60% 60–70%
U.S. Representative before election
Ric Keller
Republican
Elected U.S. Representative
Ric Keller
Republican

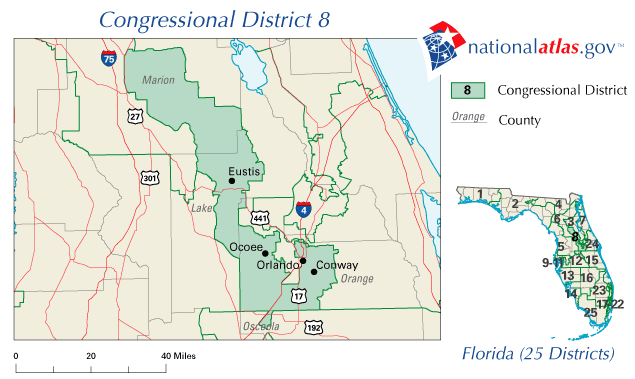

Republican congressman Ric Keller, seeking a fourth term in this moderately conservative, Central Florida-based district, faced off against businessman Charlie Stuart, a moderate Democrat. Though Keller held onto his seat in the midst of a Democratic wave that was sweeping the country, he won by only a few points.

=== Democratic primary ===
- Alan Grayson, war contractor attorney
- Homer Hartage, Orange County Commissioner
- Charlie Stuart, businessman

Democratic primary results
Party	Candidate	Votes	%
Democratic	Charlie Stuart	12,728	47.73
Democratic	Alan Grayson	9,691	36.34
Democratic	Homer Hartage	4,250	15.94
Total votes		26,669	100.00

=== Republican primary ===
- Elizabeth Doran, businesswoman
- Ric Keller, incumbent U.S. congressman

Republican primary results
Party	Candidate	Votes	%
Republican	Ric Keller (Incumbent)	30,707	72.48
Republican	Elizabeth Doran	11,661	27.52
Total votes		42,368	100.00

=== General election ===
Incumbent Republican congressman Ric Keller, best known for his Cheeseburger Bill, which prevented customers from suing fast food chains for health problems, decided to seek a fourth term in Congress. Charlie Stuart, a marketing consultant, an Orange County, Florida native and member of a prominent Orlando family, was nominated by the Democratic Party to face Keller. Stuart was touted by the Democratic Congressional Campaign Committee as a top longshot candidate and received the backing of local figures such as Congressman Allen Boyd, ex-Orlando mayors Glenda Hood and Bill Frederick and present Orlando mayor Buddy Dyer, as well as national ones such as former Virginia governor Mark Warner.

==== Predictions ====
Source	Ranking	As of
The Cook Political Report	Likely R	November 6, 2006
Rothenberg	Safe R	November 6, 2006
Sabato's Crystal Ball	Likely R	November 6, 2006
Real Clear Politics	Safe R	November 7, 2006
CQ Politics	Likely R	November 7, 2006

Florida's 8th congressional district election, 2006
Party	Candidate	Votes	%
Republican	Ric Keller (Incumbent)	95,258	52.79
Democratic	Charlie Stuart	82,526	45.73
Independent	Wes Hoaglund	2,640	1.46
Write-ins		20	0.01
Total votes		180,444	100.00
Republican hold			

== District 9 ==
2006 Florida's 9th congressional district election
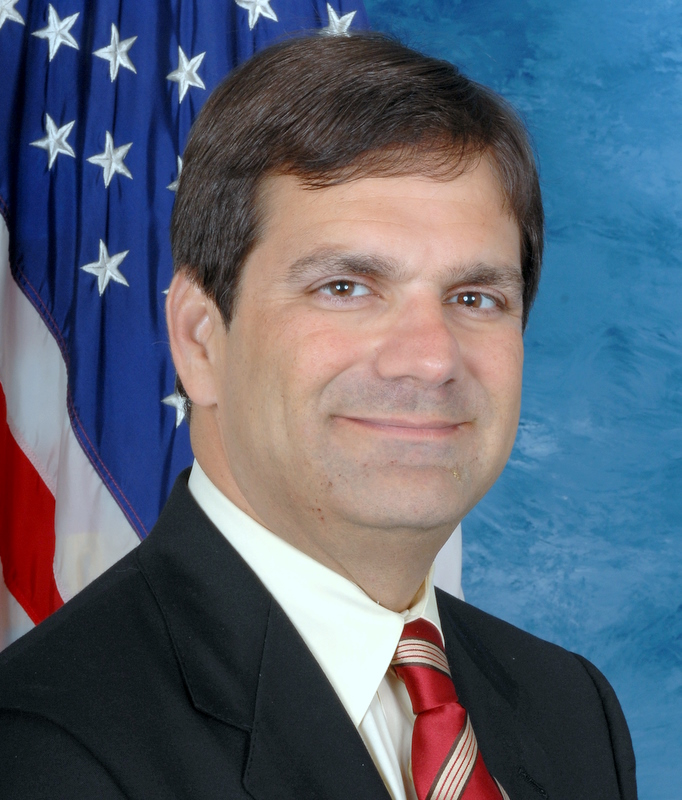

Nominee	Gus Bilirakis	Phyllis Busansky
Party	Republican	Democratic
Popular vote	123,016	96,978
Percentage	55.9%	44.1%
- County results Bilirakis: 50–60%
U.S. Representative before election
Michael Bilirakis
Republican
Elected U.S. Representative
Gus Bilirakis
Republican

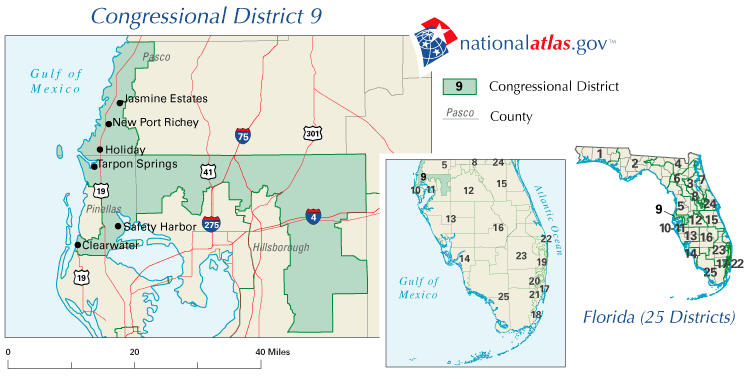

After serving twelve terms in the United States Congress, Republican incumbent congressman Michael Bilirakis declined to run for re-election. His son, Gus Bilirakis, a member of the Florida House of Representatives emerged as the Republican nominee and squared off against Phyllis Busansky, the Democratic nominee and a former Hillsborough County Commissioner. The district has a tilt towards electing Republicans, so Busansky's campaign was not given much of a chance at first. As the campaign progressed, however, it received national attention from the Democratic Congressional Campaign Committee. Though Bilirakis defeated Busansky by a ten-point margin, Busansky's performance was a large improvement over past years and outperformed her expected performance in the polls.

=== Predictions ===
Source	Ranking	As of
The Cook Political Report	Likely R	November 6, 2006
Rothenberg	Safe R	November 6, 2006
Sabato's Crystal Ball	Likely R	November 6, 2006
Real Clear Politics	Safe R	November 7, 2006
CQ Politics	Likely R	November 7, 2006

Florida's 9th congressional district election, 2006
Party	Candidate	Votes	%
Republican	Gus Bilirakis	123,016	55.91
Democratic	Phyllis Busansky	96,978	44.08
Write-ins		19	0.01
Total votes		220,013	100.00
Republican hold			

== District 10 ==
2006 Florida's 10th congressional district election
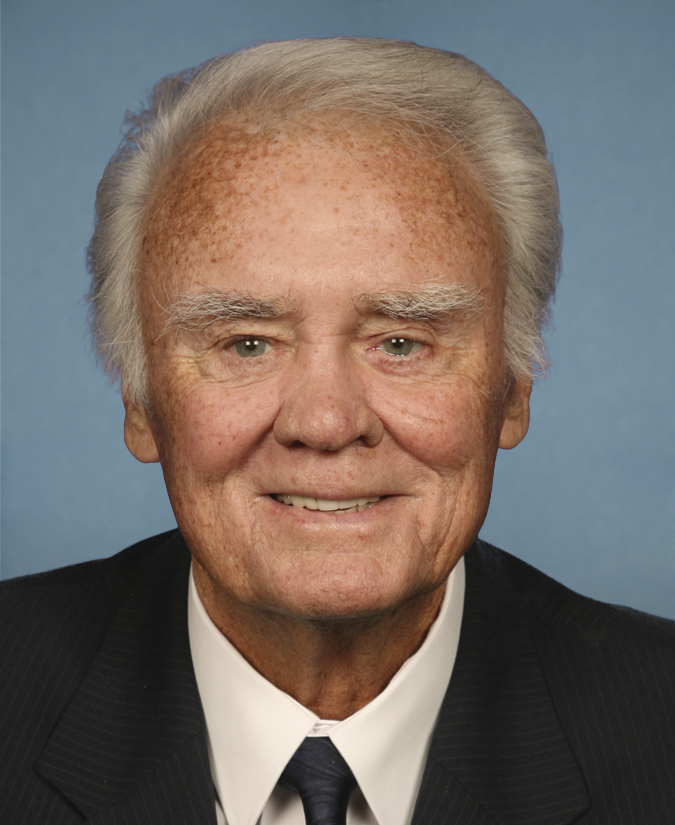

Nominee	Bill Young	Samm Simpson
Party	Republican	Democratic
Popular vote	131,488	67,950
Percentage	65.9%	34.1%
- County results Young: 60–70%
U.S. Representative before election
Bill Young
Republican
Elected U.S. Representative
Bill Young
Republican

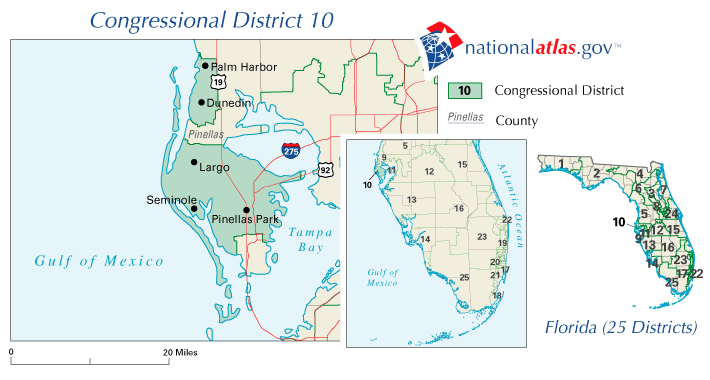

In this district, which is the only congressional district in the state to lie exclusively in one county, has been represented by incumbent Republican congressman Bill Young for several decades. A former chairman of the House Appropriations Committee, Young has been overwhelmingly re-elected year after year. In 2006, despite the moderate nature of his district and the acidic environment for Republicans nationwide, Congressman Young swamped Democratic nominee Samm Simpson.

=== Predictions ===
Source	Ranking	As of
The Cook Political Report	Safe R	November 6, 2006
Rothenberg	Safe R	November 6, 2006
Sabato's Crystal Ball	Safe R	November 6, 2006
Real Clear Politics	Safe R	November 7, 2006
CQ Politics	Safe R	November 7, 2006

Florida's 10th congressional district election, 2006
Party	Candidate	Votes	%
Republican	Bill Young (incumbent)	131,488	65.93
Democratic	Samm Simpson	67,950	34.07
Write-ins		7	0.00
Total votes		199,445	100.00
Republican hold			

== District 11 ==
2006 Florida's 11th congressional district election
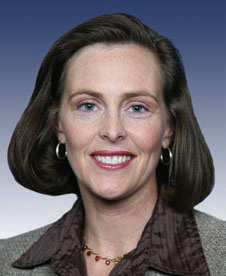

Nominee	Kathy Castor	Eddie Adams, Jr.
Party	Democratic	Republican
Popular vote	97,470	42,454
Percentage	69.7%	30.3%
- County results Castor: 60–70% 70–80% 80–90%
U.S. Representative before election
Jim Davis
Democratic
Elected U.S. Representative
Kathy Castor
Democratic

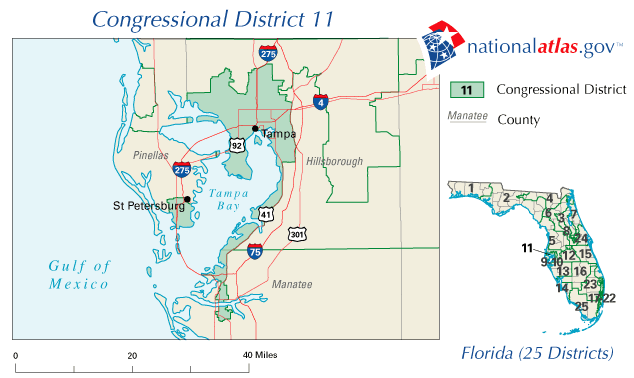

Rather than seek a sixth term in this liberal district based in Tampa, incumbent Democratic congressman Jim Davis opted to run for Governor, creating an open seat. Hillsborough County Commissioner Kathy Castor, the daughter of renowned Florida politician Betty Castor, ran for the seat and won the Democratic nomination, defeating Florida State Senate Minority Leader Les Miller. She faced Republican candidate Eddie Adams, an architect, in the general election, which she won by a convincing margin.

=== Predictions ===
Source	Ranking	As of
The Cook Political Report	Safe D	November 6, 2006
Rothenberg	Safe D	November 6, 2006
Sabato's Crystal Ball	Safe D	November 6, 2006
Real Clear Politics	Safe D	November 7, 2006
CQ Politics	Safe D	November 7, 2006

Florida's 11th congressional district election, 2006
Party	Candidate	Votes	%
Democratic	Kathy Castor	97,470	69.65
Republican	Eddie Adams, Jr.	42,454	30.34
Write-ins		18	0.01
Total votes		139,942	100.00
Democratic hold			

== District 12 ==
2006 Florida's 12th congressional district election
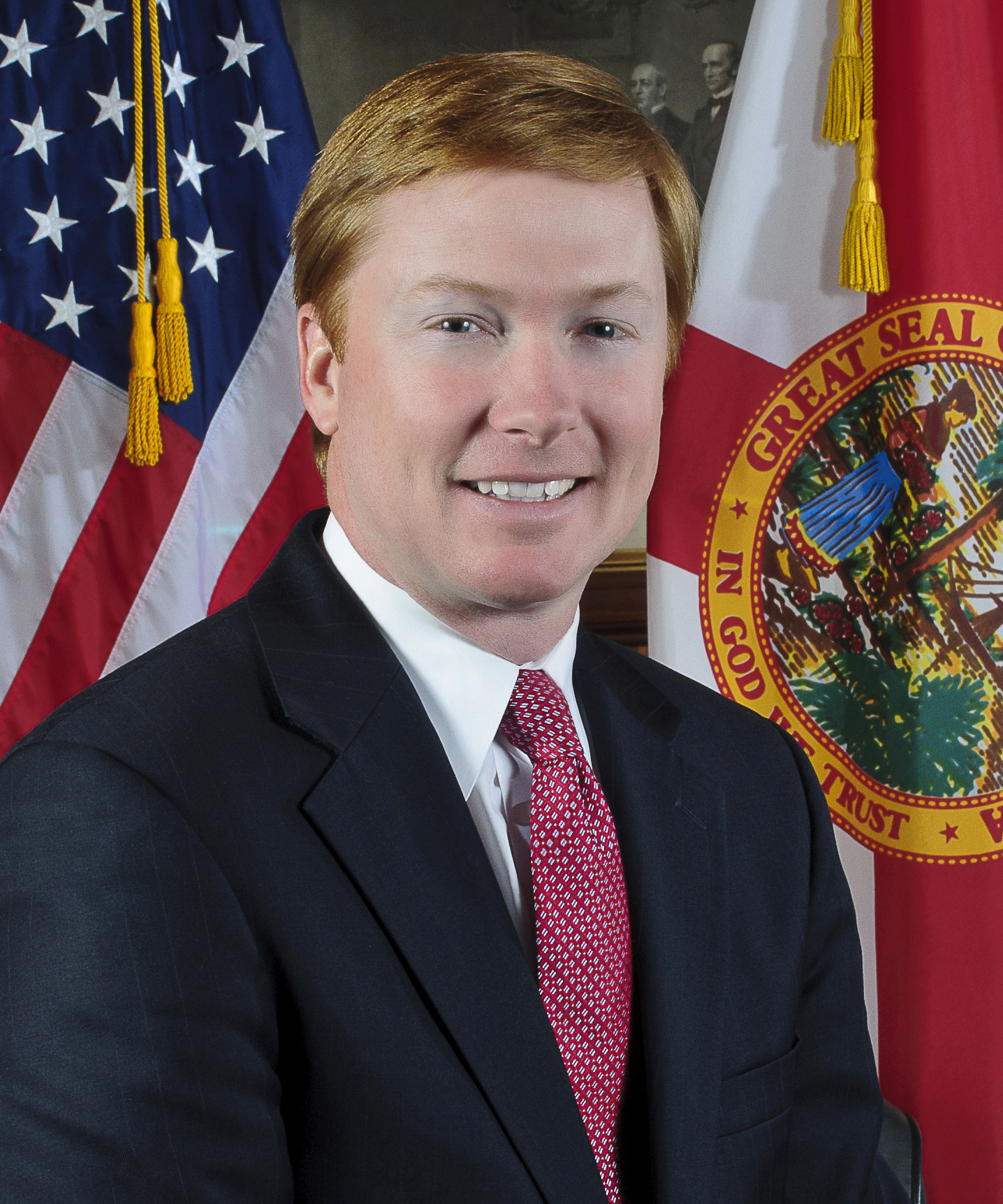

Nominee	Adam Putnam	Joe Viscusi	Ed Bowlin
Party	Republican	Independent	Independent
Popular vote	124,452	34,976	20,636
Percentage	69.1%	19.4%	11.5%
- County results Putnam: 50–60% 60–70% 70–80%
U.S. Representative before election
Adam Putnam
Republican
Elected U.S. Representative
Adam Putnam
Republican

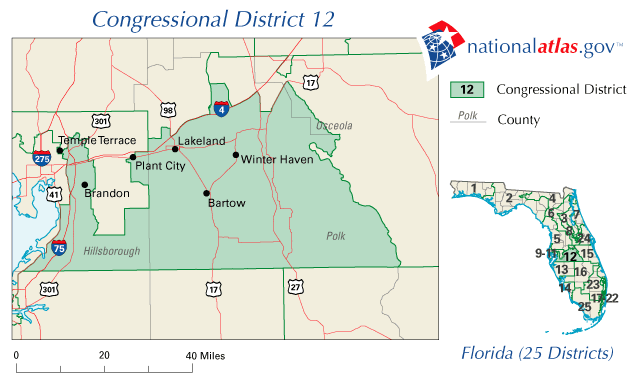

Incumbent Republican congressman Adam Putnam, a member of the Republican leadership in the House, sought and easily won a fourth term in Congress, defeating former State Representative Joe Viscusi and Ed Bowlin, both of whom ran as independents.

=== Predictions ===
Source	Ranking	As of
The Cook Political Report	Safe R	November 6, 2006
Rothenberg	Safe R	November 6, 2006
Sabato's Crystal Ball	Safe R	November 6, 2006
Real Clear Politics	Safe R	November 7, 2006
CQ Politics	Safe R	November 7, 2006

Florida's 12th congressional district election, 2006
Party	Candidate	Votes	%
Republican	Adam Putnam (incumbent)	124,452	69.12
Independent	Joe Viscusi	34,976	19.42
Independent	Ed Bowlin	20,636	11.46
Total votes		180,064	100.00
Republican hold			

== District 13 ==
2006 Florida's 13th congressional district election
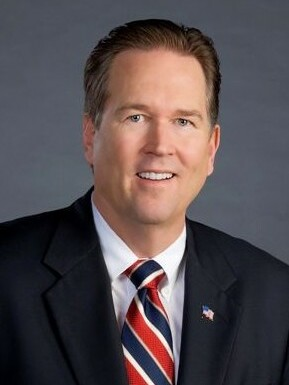

Nominee	Vern Buchanan	Christine Jennings
Party	Republican	Democratic
Popular vote	119,309	118,940
Percentage	50.08%	49.92%
- County results Buchanan: 50–60% 60–70% Jennings: 50–60%
U.S. Representative before election
Katherine Harris
Republican
Elected U.S. Representative
Vern Buchanan
Republican

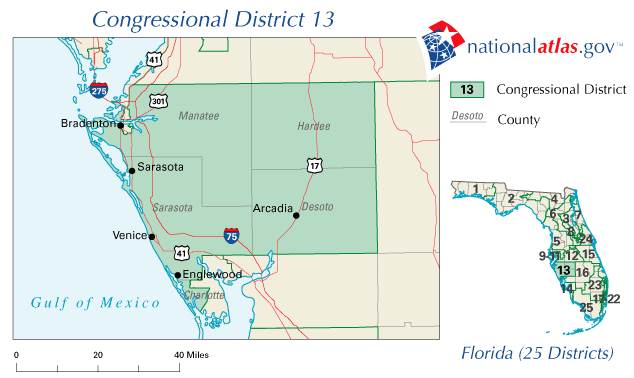

Two-term incumbent Republican congresswoman Katherine Harris opted to run for Senate rather than seek a third term, creating an open seat. The 13th district, based in Southwest Florida, is fairly conservative, but a competitive race emerged between the Republican nominee, car dealership owner Vern Buchanan, and the Democratic nominee, banking executive Christine Jennings. Though Buchanan appeared to be victorious on election day by a 350-vote margin, Jennings requested a recount. Though the recount did not change the outcome of the race, Jennings filed additional complaints due to the fact that 13% of Sarasota County residents did not vote in the Congressional election, an unusually high number and the fact that the touch-screen machines did not provide a paper trail.

Believing the matter to be unsettled, Jennings sued to challenge the results of the election in court, noting the "pervasive malfunctioning of electronic voting machines." A Florida circuit judge rejected her lawsuit in December 2006, ruling that her allegations of lost votes in Sarasota County were "conjecture." Jennings met further failure in June 2007, when a Florida state appellate court ruled that Jennings did not meet the "extraordinary burden" of proving the lower court judge was wrong.

Though Jennings fought the results further by appealing directly to the United States House of Representatives, this action, too, caused her to walk away empty-handed. After a three-person House task force was created to evaluate the election, the task force voted along party lines to refer an investigation into Florida's 13th district House race to the Government Accountability Office (GAO).

In February 2008, the committee and the House accepted the findings of the GAO that no machine error affected the outcome of the election, going a step further to pass HR 989, which affirmed the findings of the committee, accepted the results of the 2006 race and formally dismissed Jennings' challenge of the election's results. Jennings formally dropped her challenge shortly thereafter to focus on her 2008 rematch against Buchanan.

=== Predictions ===
Source	Ranking	As of
The Cook Political Report	Tossup	November 6, 2006
Rothenberg	Tilt D (flip)	November 6, 2006
Sabato's Crystal Ball	Lean D (flip)	November 6, 2006
Real Clear Politics	Tossup	November 7, 2006
CQ Politics	Tossup	November 7, 2006

Florida's 13th congressional district election, 2006
Party	Candidate	Votes	%
Republican	Vern Buchanan	119,309	50.08
Democratic	Christine Jennings	118,940	49.92
Total votes		238,249	100.00
Republican hold			

== District 14 ==
2006 Florida's 14th congressional district election
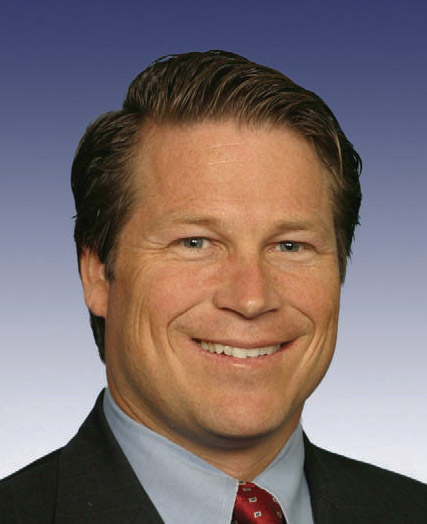

Nominee	Connie Mack IV	Robert M. Neeld
Party	Republican	Democratic
Popular vote	151,615	83,920
Percentage	64.4%	35.6%
- County results Mack: 60–70% 70–80%
U.S. Representative before election
Connie Mack IV
Republican
Elected U.S. Representative
Connie Mack IV
Republican

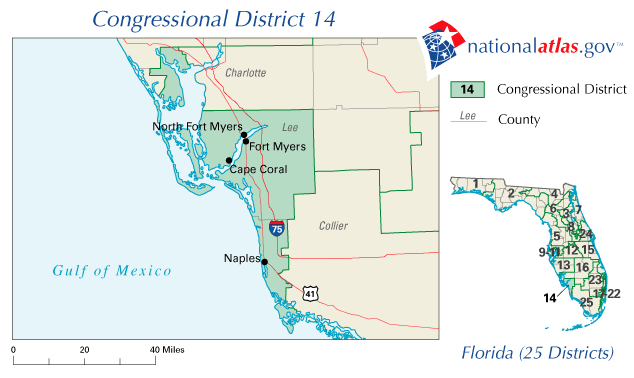

After winning his first Congressional election in 2004 to replace Porter Goss, incumbent Republican congressman Connie Mack IV sought a second term in 2006. Mack's district, based in the Gulf Coast region of Florida, is solidly conservative and overwhelmingly gave the congressman a second term over Democratic candidate Robert Neeld.

=== Predictions ===
Source	Ranking	As of
The Cook Political Report	Safe R	November 6, 2006
Rothenberg	Safe R	November 6, 2006
Sabato's Crystal Ball	Safe R	November 6, 2006
Real Clear Politics	Safe R	November 7, 2006
CQ Politics	Safe R	November 7, 2006

Florida's 14th congressional district election, 2006)
Party	Candidate	Votes	%
Republican	Connie Mack IV (incumbent)	151,615	64.37
Democratic	Robert M. Neeld	83,920	35.63
Write-ins		4	0.00
Total votes		235,539	100.00
Republican hold			

== District 15 ==
2006 Florida's 15th congressional district election
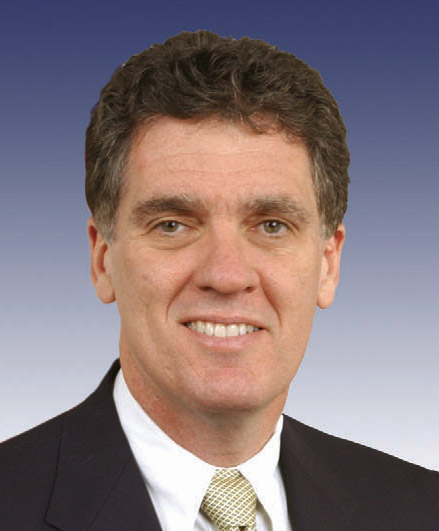

Nominee	Dave Weldon	Robert Bowman
Party	Republican	Democratic
Popular vote	125,965	97,834
Percentage	56.3%	43.7%
- County results Weldon: 50–60% 60–70%
U.S. Representative before election
Dave Weldon
Republican
Elected U.S. Representative
Dave Weldon
Republican

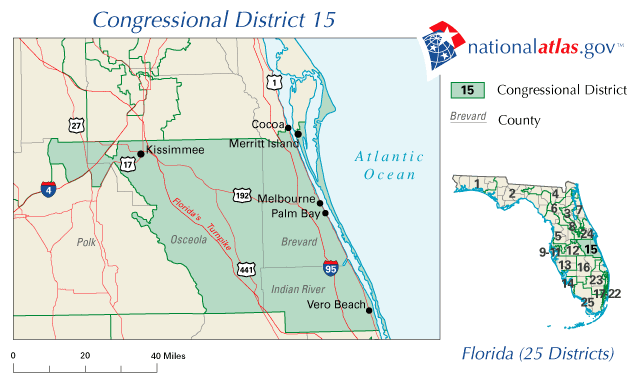

In this Space Coast-based district, incumbent Republican congressman Dave Weldon sought election to a seventh term in Congress. This district, though undoubtedly conservative, gave Weldon a smaller margin of victory over Democratic nominee Robert Bowman in 2006 than in previous years, likely due to the anti-Republican sentiment nationwide.

=== Predictions ===
Source	Ranking	As of
The Cook Political Report	Safe R	November 6, 2006
Rothenberg	Safe R	November 6, 2006
Sabato's Crystal Ball	Safe R	November 6, 2006
Real Clear Politics	Safe R	November 7, 2006
CQ Politics	Safe R	November 7, 2006

Florida's 15th congressional district election, 2006
Party	Candidate	Votes	%
Republican	Dave Weldon (incumbent)	125,965	56.29
Democratic	Robert Bowman	97,834	43.71
Total votes		223,799	100.00
Turnout			
Republican hold			

== District 16 ==
2006 Florida's 16th congressional district election
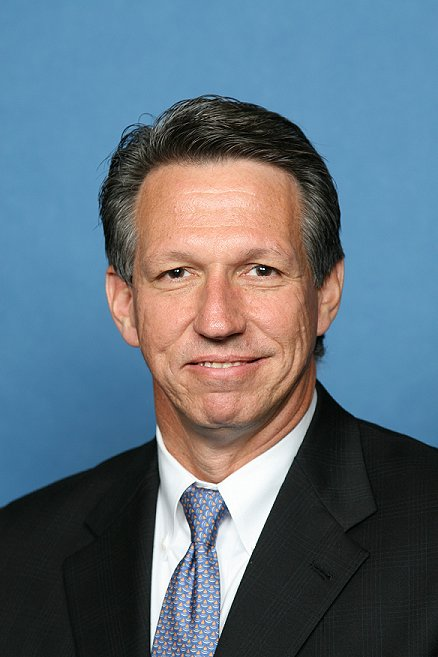

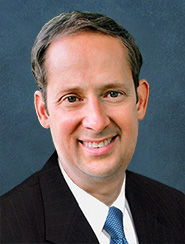
Nominee	Tim Mahoney	Joe Negron
Party	Democratic	Republican
Popular vote	115,832	111,415
Percentage	49.55%	47.66%
- County results Mahoney: 50–60% Negron: 40–50% 50–60%
U.S. Representative before election
Vacant
Elected U.S. Representative
Tim Mahoney
Democratic

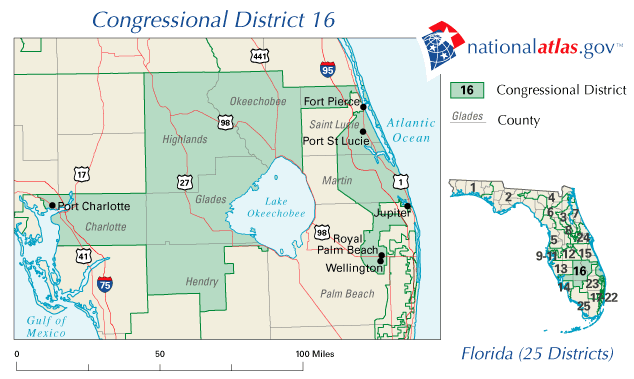

Incumbent Republican congressman Mark Foley was considered to be a shoo-in for re-election until the House page scandal involving Foley became public knowledge. The Congressman resigned on September 29, 2006, thus cancelling his re-election bid. The Republican Party of Florida selected Florida state representative Joe Negron to replace Foley, though Foley's name remained on the ballot. Though Negron launched a successful campaign to urge voters to "Punch Foley for Joe!", indicating that voters should "punch" Foley's name on the ballot to vote for Negron, he was ultimately unsuccessful on election day and fell to Democratic nominee and businessman Tim Mahoney.

One poll taken by Hamilton Beattie on September 12, 2006, had Foley leading Tim Mahoney in a matchup by 48% for Foley to 35% for Mahoney .

According to the state of Florida, 42% of the voters in this district are registered Republicans, and 36% are registered Democrats. George W. Bush won this district with 52% of the vote in the 2000 presidential election, and with 54% of the vote in the 2004 presidential election.

Mahoney has sharply criticized the Bush administration for overspending, general mismanagement, and its policies in Iraq. In August, General Wesley Clark endorsed the candidacy of Mahoney for Congress.

On September 28, 2006, ABC News reported that Republican incumbent Mark Foley had sent email messages, from his personal AOL account, to a then-16-year-old former Congressional page, asking the page to send a photo of himself to Foley, among other things that were overtly sexual in nature.

Mahoney has called for a full investigation of Foley's actions. The next day Foley submitted a letter of resignation from Congress on September 29, 2006 in the wake of news reports about the communications.

Republicans' hold on Mark Foley's seat went "from safe to shaky overnight." On October 2, 2006, the Florida Republican Party Executive Board selected state representative Joe Negron as Mahoney's new opponent. However, Negron's name did not appear on the ballot so he only received votes cast for Foley, whose name remained on the ballot by law. On election day Mahoney narrowly defeated Negron by 1.8 percentage points. While Negron carried most of the more conservative areas of the district near Fort Myers, Mahoney carried the two largest counties in the district, Palm Beach and St. Lucie counties, by a combined margin of over 10,000 votes — far more than the actual margin of victory. He was the first Democrat to represent the district since its creation in 1973 (it was the 10th District until 1983 and the 12th District until 1993).

=== Endorsements ===
Tim Mahoney (D)

Individuals

- Wesley Clark, General, 2004 democratic presidential candidate

==== Predictions ====
Source	Ranking	As of
The Cook Political Report	Tossup	November 6, 2006
Rothenberg	Tossup	November 6, 2006
Sabato's Crystal Ball	Tilt D (flip)	November 6, 2006
Real Clear Politics	Lean D (flip)	November 7, 2006
CQ Politics	Lean D (flip)	November 7, 2006

Florida's 16th congressional district election, 2006
Party	Candidate	Votes	%
Democratic	Tim Mahoney	115,832	49.55
Republican	Joe Negron	111,415	47.66
Independent	Emmie Lee Ross	6,526	2.79
Total votes		223,799	100.00
Democratic gain from Republican			

== District 17 ==
2006 Florida's 17th congressional district election
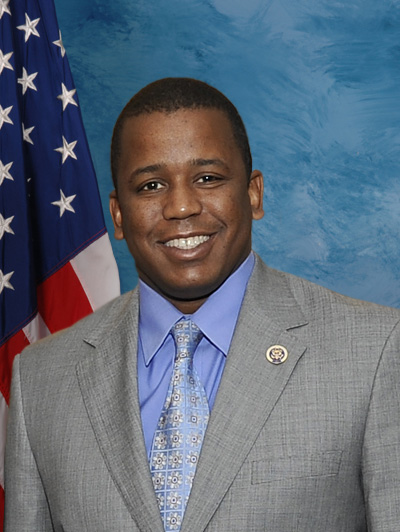
Nominee	Kendrick Meek
Party	Democratic
Popular vote	90,663
Percentage	100.0%
- County results Meek: 90–100%
U.S. Representative before election
Kendrick Meek
Democratic
Elected U.S. Representative
Kendrick Meek
Democratic

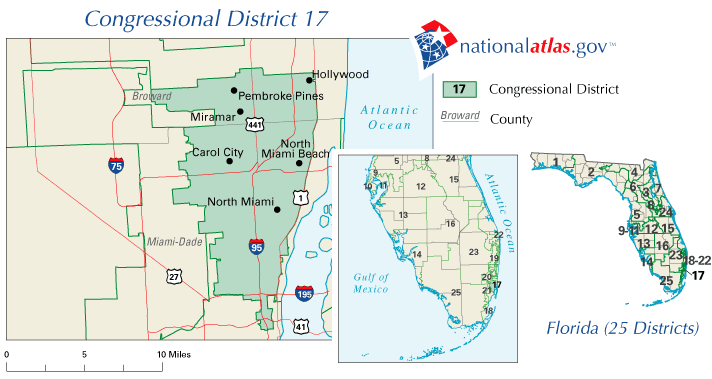

This majority African-American district based in southern Broward County and eastern Miami-Dade County has a very strong Democratic tilt and has been represented by Congressman Kendrick Meek since his initial election in 2002 and was previously represented by Meek's mother, Carrie Meek, for ten years. Meek was overwhelmingly elected to a third term with no Republican or independent challenger.

=== Predictions ===
Source	Ranking	As of
The Cook Political Report	Safe D	November 6, 2006
Rothenberg	Safe D	November 6, 2006
Sabato's Crystal Ball	Safe D	November 6, 2006
Real Clear Politics	Safe D	November 7, 2006
CQ Politics	Safe D	November 7, 2006

Florida's 17th congressional district election, 2006
Party	Candidate	Votes	%
Democratic	Kendrick Meek (incumbent)	90,663	99.97
Write-ins		23	0.03
Total votes		90,686	100.00
Democratic hold			

== District 18 ==
2006 Florida's 18th congressional district election
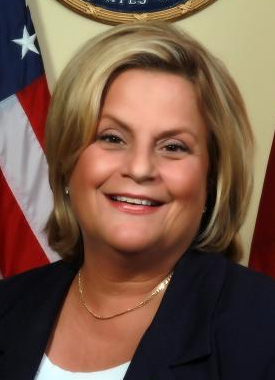

Nominee	Ileana Ros-Lehtinen	Dave Patlak
Party	Republican	Democratic
Popular vote	79,631	48,499
Percentage	62.1%	37.9%
- County results Ros-Lehtinen: 50–60% 60–70%
U.S. Representative before election
Ileana Ros-Lehtinen
Republican
Elected U.S. Representative
Ileana Ros-Lehtinen
Republican

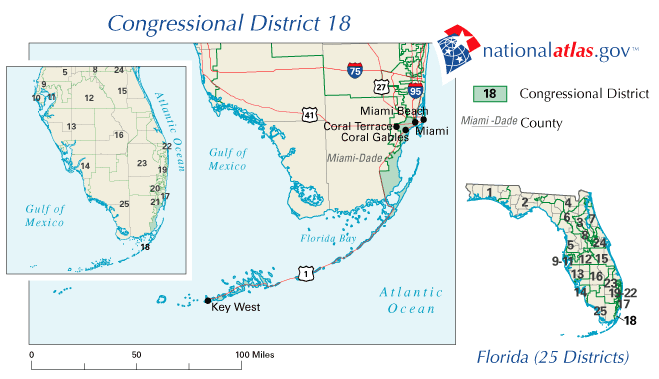

Incumbent Republican congresswoman Ileana Ros-Lehtinen, a respected member of the House Foreign Affairs Committee, represents a marginally conservative district that encompasses much of Miami, the southern suburbs of Miami, and the entire Florida Keys. Seeking a tenth term in Congress, Ros-Lehtinen easily defeated Democratic nominee Dave Patlak in the general election.

=== Predictions ===
Source	Ranking	As of
The Cook Political Report	Safe R	November 6, 2006
Rothenberg	Safe R	November 6, 2006
Sabato's Crystal Ball	Safe R	November 6, 2006
Real Clear Politics	Safe R	November 7, 2006
CQ Politics	Safe R	November 7, 2006

Florida's 18th congressional district election, 2006
Party	Candidate	Votes	%
Republican	Ileana Ros-Lehtinen (incumbent)	79,631	62.15
Democratic	Dave Patlak	48,499	37.85
Total votes		128,130	100.00
Republican hold			

== District 19 ==
2006 Florida's 19th congressional district election
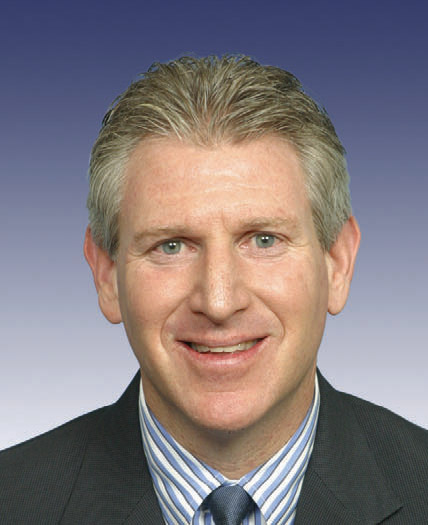
Nominee	Robert Wexler
Party	Democratic
Popular vote	Unopposed
Percentage
U.S. Representative before election
Robert Wexler
Democratic
Elected U.S. Representative
Robert Wexler
Democratic

=== Predictions ===
Source	Ranking	As of
The Cook Political Report	Safe D	November 6, 2006
Rothenberg	Safe D	November 6, 2006
Sabato's Crystal Ball	Safe D	November 6, 2006
Real Clear Politics	Safe D	November 7, 2006
CQ Politics	Safe D	November 7, 2006

Results

Florida's 19th congressional district election, 2006
Party	Candidate	Votes	%
Democratic	Robert Wexler	Unopposed	

== District 20 ==
2006 Florida's 20th congressional district election
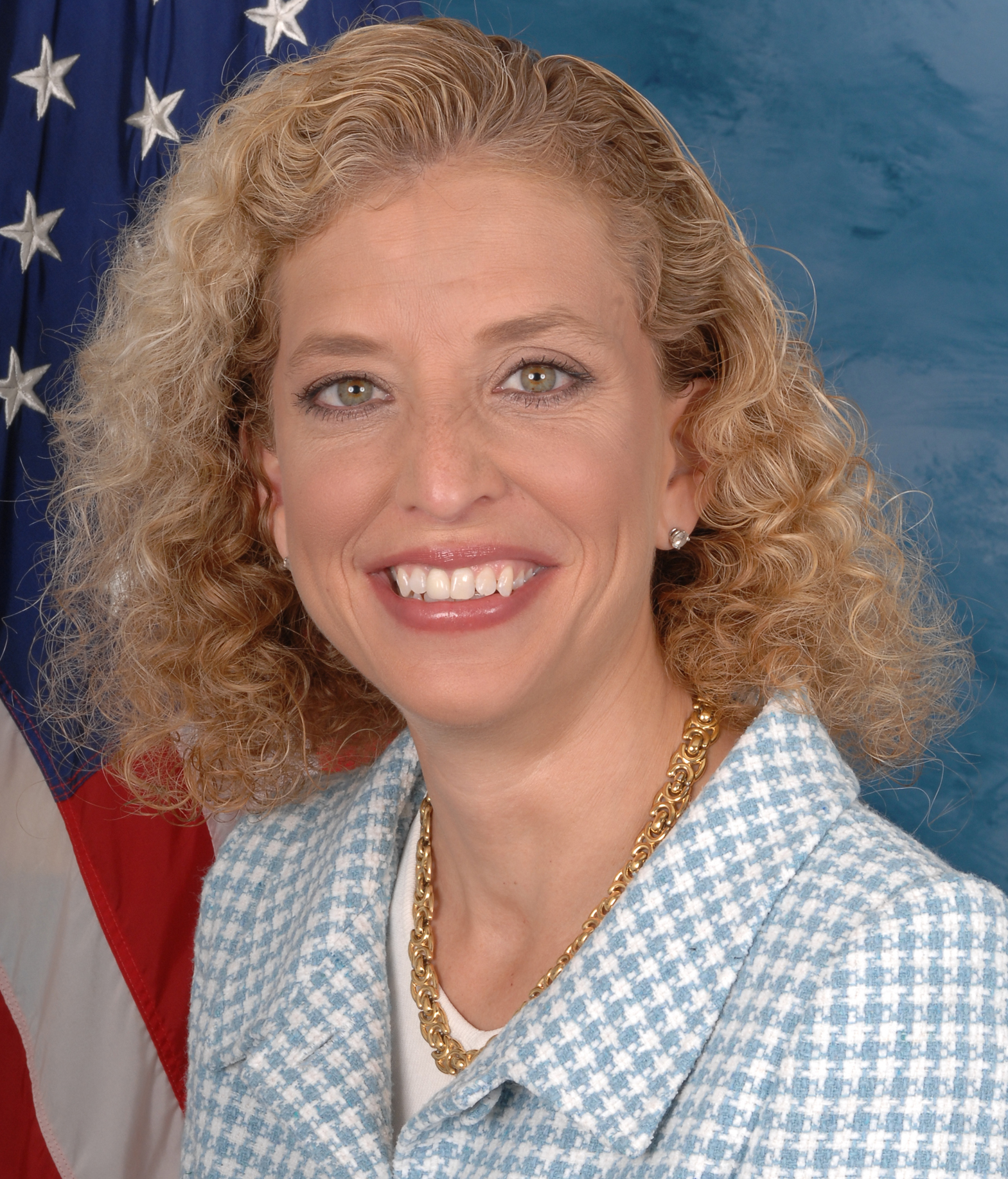
Nominee	Debbie Wasserman Schultz
Party	Democratic
Popular vote	Unopposed
Percentage
U.S. Representative before election
Debbie Wasserman Schultz
Democratic
Elected U.S. Representative
Debbie Wasserman Schultz
Democratic

=== Predictions ===
Source	Ranking	As of
The Cook Political Report	Safe D	November 6, 2006
Rothenberg	Safe D	November 6, 2006
Sabato's Crystal Ball	Safe D	November 6, 2006
Real Clear Politics	Safe D	November 7, 2006
CQ Politics	Safe D	November 7, 2006

Results

Florida's 20th congressional district election, 2006
Party	Candidate	Votes	%
Democratic	Debbie Wasserman Schultz	Unopposed	

== District 21 ==
2006 Florida's 21st congressional district election
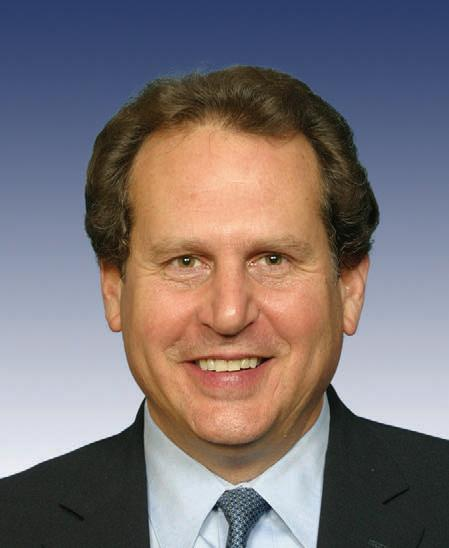

Nominee	Lincoln Diaz-Balart	Frank Gonzalez
Party	Republican	Democratic
Popular vote	66,784	45,522
Percentage	59.5%	40.5%
- County results Diaz-balart: 60–70% Gonzalez: 50–60%
U.S. Representative before election
Lincoln Diaz-Balart
Republican
Elected U.S. Representative
Lincoln Diaz-Balart
Republican

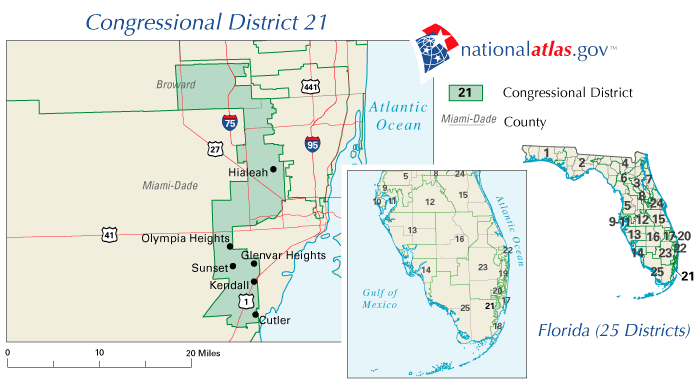

Incumbent Republican congressman Lincoln Diaz-Balart decided to run for an eighth term in Congress in this district composed of the western suburbs of Miami. Conservative due to the large presence of Cuban-Americans here, this district is a Hispanic-American majority district and has regularly sent Congressman Diaz-Balart back to Washington with solid victories. 2006 proved to be no different, and Diaz-Balart defeated Frank Gonzalez, though by a thinner margin than is usually achieved in this district.

=== Predictions ===
Source	Ranking	As of
The Cook Political Report	Safe R	November 6, 2006
Rothenberg	Safe R	November 6, 2006
Sabato's Crystal Ball	Safe R	November 6, 2006
Real Clear Politics	Safe R	November 7, 2006
CQ Politics	Safe R	November 7, 2006

Florida's 21st congressional district election, 2006
Party	Candidate	Votes	%
Republican	Lincoln Diaz-Balart (incumbent)	66,784	59.47
Democratic	Frank Gonzalez	45,522	40.53
Total votes		112,306	100.00
Republican hold			

== District 22 ==
2006 Florida's 22nd congressional district election
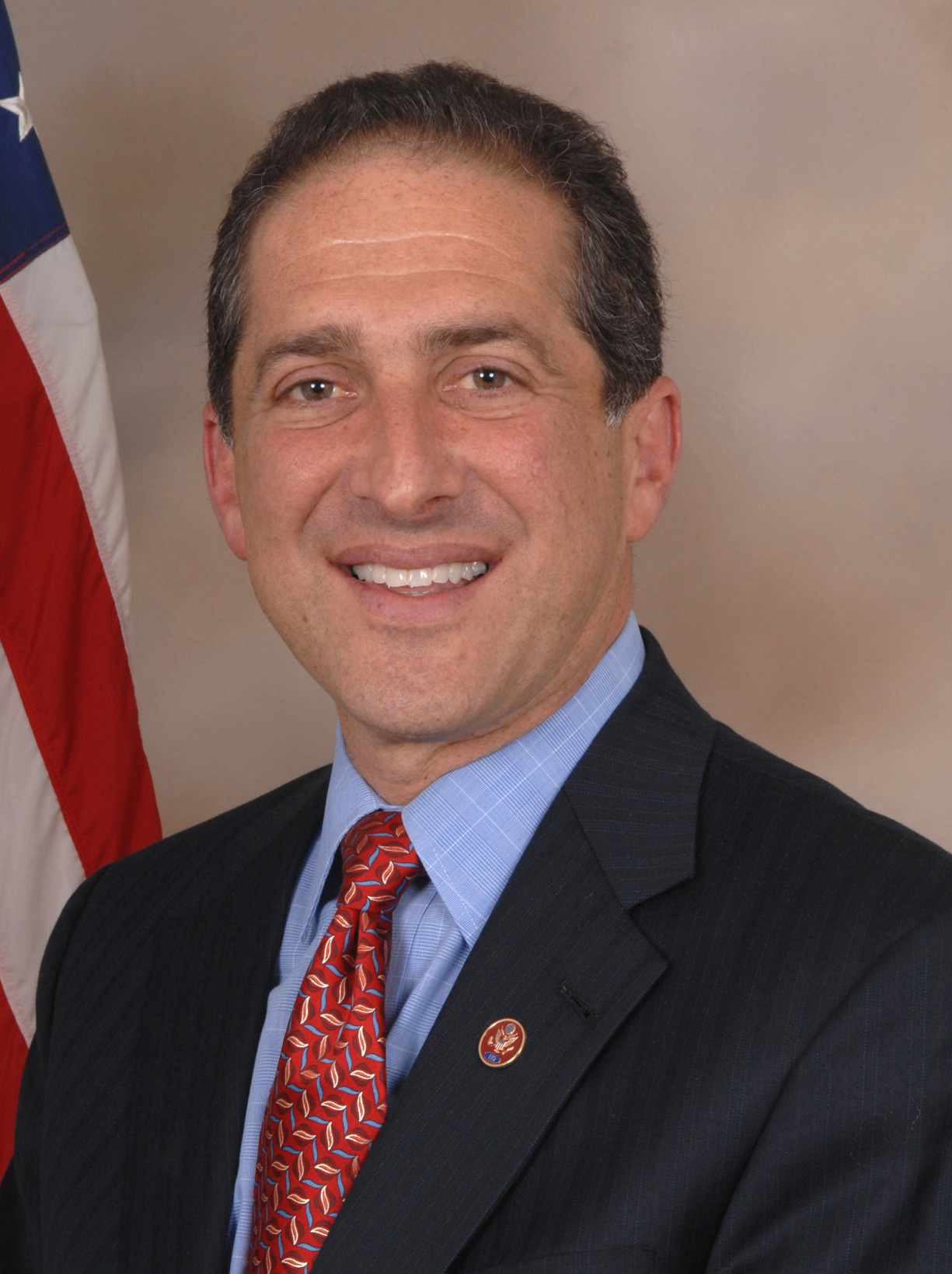

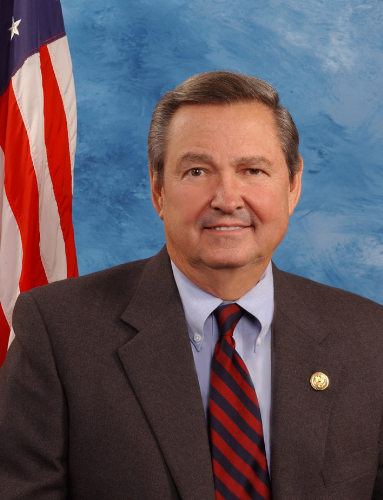
Nominee	Ron Klein	Clay Shaw
Party	Democratic	Republican
Popular vote	108,688	100,663
Percentage	50.9%	47.1%
- County results Klein: 50–60%
U.S. Representative before election
Clay Shaw
Republican
Elected U.S. Representative
Ron Klein
Democratic

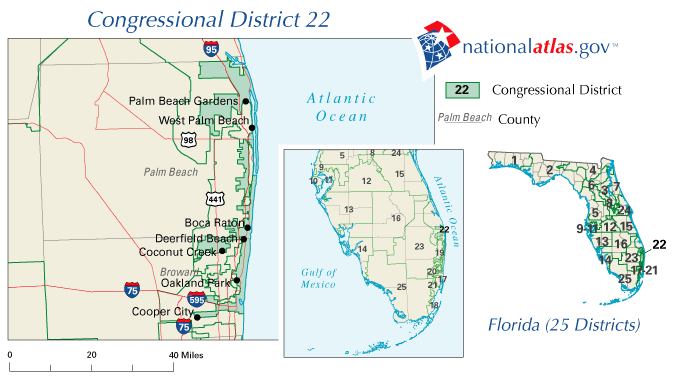

This district, which stretches from northern Broward County to northern Palm Beach County, marginally leads towards the Democratic side, but incumbent Republican congressman Clay Shaw's pragmatic and moderate profile in Congress enabled him to continually be re-elected. This year, however, Shaw faced difficulty in his bid for a fourteenth term. Florida state senator Ron Klein, previously the Democratic leader in the Senate, ultimately defeated Shaw in the general election by a three-point margin.

=== Predictions ===
Source	Ranking	As of
The Cook Political Report	Tossup	November 6, 2006
Rothenberg	Tossup	November 6, 2006
Sabato's Crystal Ball	Tilt D (flip)	November 6, 2006
Real Clear Politics	Lean R	November 7, 2006
CQ Politics	Tossup	November 7, 2006

Florida's 22nd congressional district election, 2006
Party	Candidate	Votes	%
Democratic	Ron Klein	108,688	50.88
Republican	Clay Shaw (incumbent)	100,663	47.13
Independent	Neil Evangelista	4,254	1.99
Total votes		213,605	100.00
Democratic gain from Republican			

== District 23 ==
2006 Florida's 23rd congressional district election
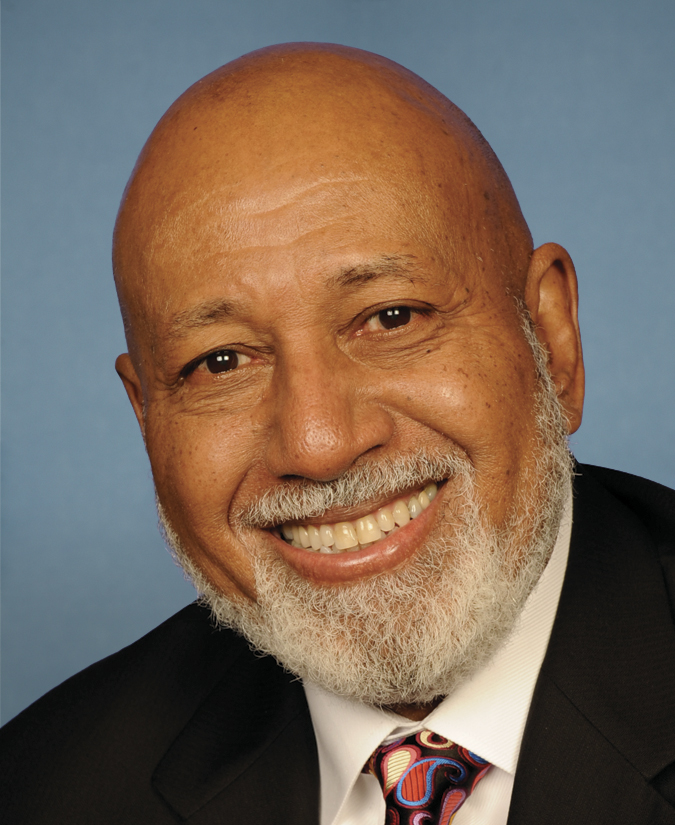
Nominee	Alcee L. Hastings
Party	Democratic
Popular vote	Unopposed
Percentage
U.S. Representative before election
Alcee Hastings
Democratic
Elected U.S. Representative
Alcee L. Hastings
Democratic

=== Predictions ===
Source	Ranking	As of
The Cook Political Report	Safe D	November 6, 2006
Rothenberg	Safe D	November 6, 2006
Sabato's Crystal Ball	Safe D	November 6, 2006
Real Clear Politics	Safe D	November 7, 2006
CQ Politics	Safe D	November 7, 2006

Results

Florida's 23rd congressional district election, 2006
Party	Candidate	Votes	%
Democratic	Alcee L. Hastings	Unopposed	

== District 24 ==
2006 Florida's 24th congressional district election
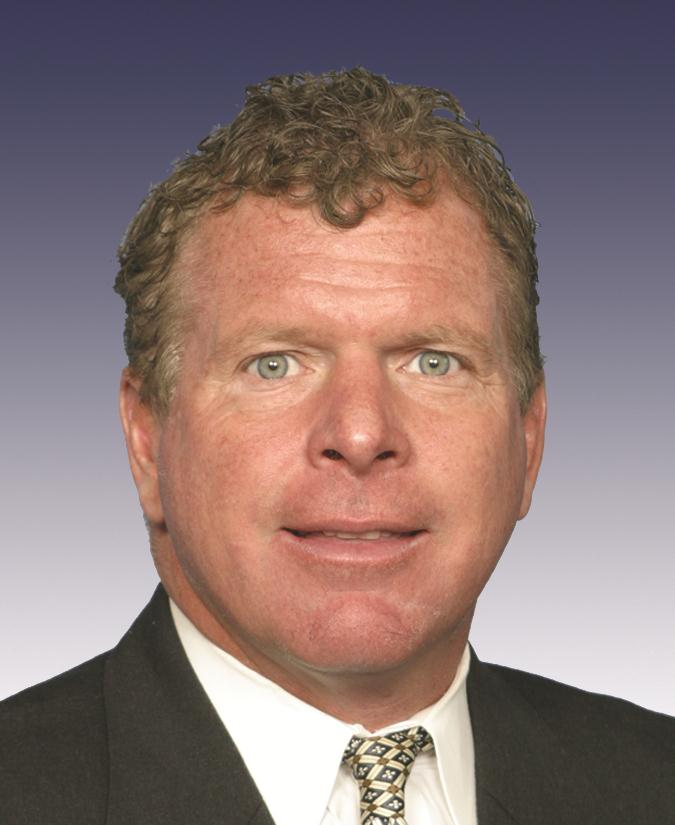

Nominee	Tom Feeney	Clint Curtis
Party	Republican	Democratic
Popular vote	123,795	89,863
Percentage	57.9%	42.1%
- County results Feeney: 50–60% 60–70%
U.S. Representative before election
Tom Feeney
Republican
Elected U.S. Representative
Tom Feeney
Republican

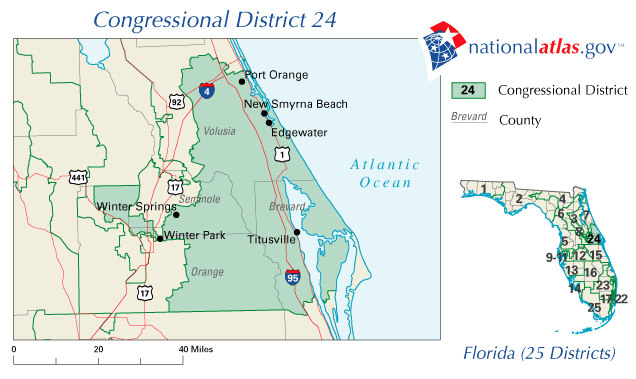

Incumbent Republican congressman Tom Feeney, initially elected in 2002 and re-elected unopposed in 2004 in this hand-crafted, gerrymandered district, hardly faced a challenge from Democratic candidate Clint Curtis. Feeney, however, was marred by allegations of corruption brought about by Curtis, a computer programmer who claimed that Feeney asked Curtis to create a software to "steal" votes using touch-screen voting machines. Feeney treated Curtis like a gadfly, sending out mailers featuring Curtis with a tin-foil hat and refusing to debate him. Polling, however, indicated that the race was tight, with a Zogby poll showing Feeney at a 45% level of support and Curtis attaining 43%. Ultimately, though, on election day, Feeney swamped Curtis, winning all four counties in the district. The surprisingly close race, however, indicated that Feeney could be brought down with a serious challenger.

=== Predictions ===
Source	Ranking	As of
The Cook Political Report	Safe R	November 6, 2006
Rothenberg	Safe R	November 6, 2006
Sabato's Crystal Ball	Safe R	November 6, 2006
Real Clear Politics	Safe R	November 7, 2006
CQ Politics	Safe R	November 7, 2006

Florida's 24th congressional district election, 2006)
Party	Candidate	Votes	%
Republican	Tom Feeney (incumbent)	123,795	57.94
Democratic	Clint Curtis	89,863	42.06
Total votes		213,658	100.00
Republican hold			

== District 25 ==
2006 Florida's 25th congressional district election
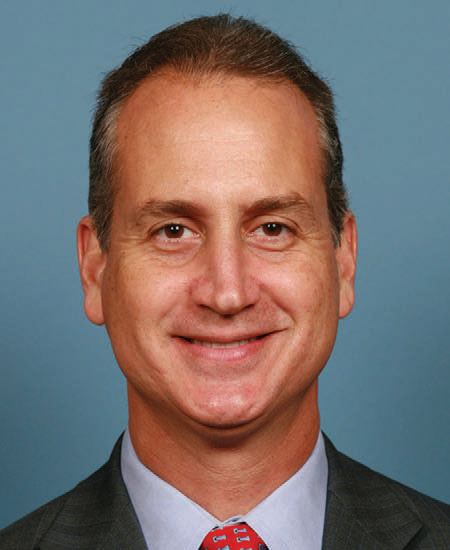

Nominee	Mario Diaz-Balart	Michael Calderin
Party	Republican	Democratic
Popular vote	60,765	43,168
Percentage	58.5%	41.5%
- County results Diaz-balart: 50–60% 60–70% Calderin: 50–60%
U.S. Representative before election
Mario Diaz-Balart
Republican
Elected U.S. Representative
Mario Diaz-Balart
Republican

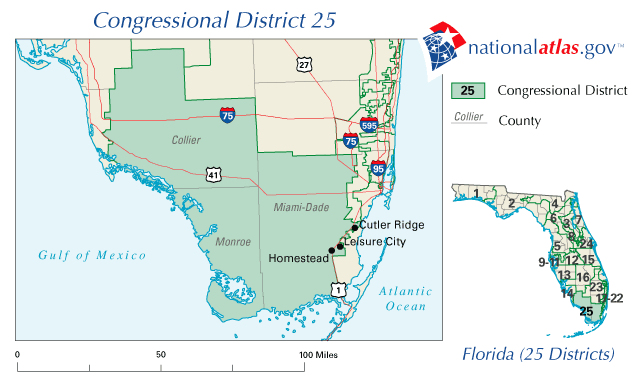

This district, with a Hispanic-American majority and based in South Florida, has the tendency to support Republican candidates. Incumbent Republican congressman Mario Diaz-Balart has represented the district since its creation in 2003 and had not faced a close call so far in his career. In 2006, however, though Diaz-Balart defeated Democratic opponent Michael Calderin by a solid margin, it was a thinner margin than usual.

=== Predictions ===
Source	Ranking	As of
The Cook Political Report	Safe R	November 6, 2006
Rothenberg	Safe R	November 6, 2006
Sabato's Crystal Ball	Safe R	November 6, 2006
Real Clear Politics	Safe R	November 7, 2006
CQ Politics	Safe R	November 7, 2006

Florida's 25th congressional district election, 2006
Party	Candidate	Votes	%
Republican	Mario Diaz-Balart (incumbent)	60,765	58.47
Democratic	Michael Calderin	43,168	41.53
Total votes		103,933	100.00
Republican hold			

== See also ==
- 2006 Florida state elections
- 2006 United States House of Representatives elections
