= Buddy Johnson (politician) =

American politician (born 1952)

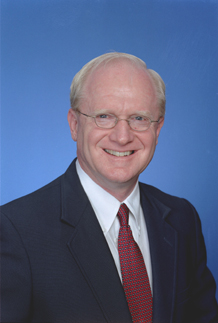

Hillsborough County Supervisor of Elections
- In office January 27, 2003 – January 6, 2009
- Preceded by: Pam Iorio
- Succeeded by: Phyllis Busansky

Member of the Florida House of Representatives
- In office March 12, 1991 – November 5, 1996
- Preceded by: Carl Carpenter Jr.
- Succeeded by: Johnnie Byrd
- Constituency: 61st district (1991–1992); 62nd district (1992–1996)

Personal details
- Born: May 22, 1952 (age 74) Lakeland, Florida
- Party: Republican
- Children: 3
- Education: University of South Florida (B.A.)
- Occupation: Restaurateur

Phillip E. "Buddy" Johnson (born May 22, 1952) is a Republican politician from Florida who served as a member of the Florida House of Representatives from 1991 to 1996 and as Hillsborough County Supervisor of Elections from 2003 to 2009.

== Early life ==
Johnson was born in Lakeland, Florida, in 1952. He attended the University of South Florida, graduating in 1976 with his bachelor's degree in religious studies. With his brother, Fred, Johnson owned and operated Buddy Freddy's Restaurant in Plant City until it closed in 2020.

== Florida House of Representatives ==
In 1991, State Representative Carl Carpenter Jr. announced that he would resign from the Florida House of Representatives to serve as Deputy Agriculture Commissioner, and a special election was held in the 61st district to succeed him. Johnson announced that he would run, and won the Republican nomination unopposed. He faced Plant City Commissioner Mike Sparkman, the Democratic nominee and an investor in Johnson's restaurant, in the general election. Johnson ultimately defeated Sparkman by a wide margin, receiving 58 percent of the vote to Sparkman's 42 percent, and flipping the seat.

Following redistricting, Johnson ran for re-election in the 62nd district in 1992. He was challenged by former Plant City Mayor Sadye Martin. Though Johnson's seat was seen as a pickup opportunity by the Democratic Party, which recruited Martin to run, Johnson won the general election with 60 percent of the vote.

In 1994, Johnson was unopposed for re-election. He declined to run for re-election in 1996, citing a desire to spend more time with his children.

== Hillsborough County Supervisor of Elections ==
In 2003, when Hillsborough County Supervisor of Elections Pam Iorio resigned to run for mayor of Tampa, Governor Jeb Bush appointed Johnson to serve out the remaining two years of her term. He ran for a full term in 2004, and was challenged by Democrat Rob MacKenna, a computer programmer. Johnson narrowly won the general election, winning 53 percent of the vote to MacKenna's 47 percent.

Johnson ran for re-election to a second full term in 2008, and he was challenged by former Hillsborough County Commissioner Phyllis Busansky. Busansky defeated Johnson by a thin margin, receiving 52 percent of the vote to his 48 percent.
