= Carl Carpenter Jr. =

American politician (born 1935)

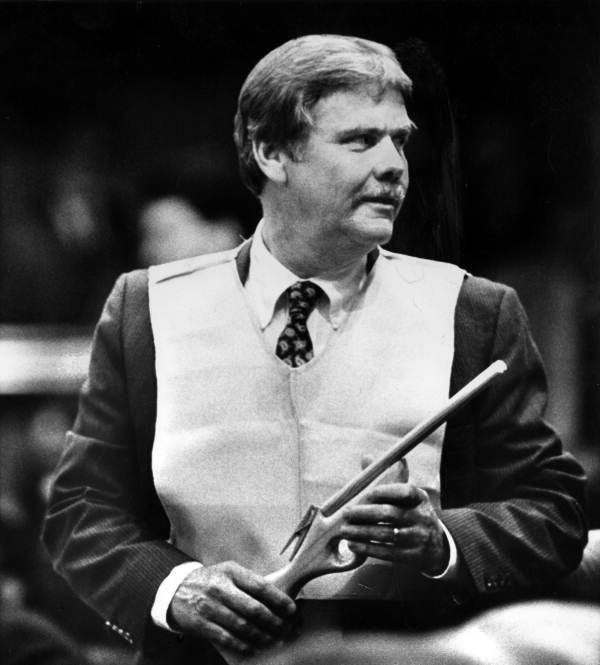
- Carpenter on the House floor in 1988

Member of the Florida House of Representatives
- In office November 7, 1978 – February 1, 1991
- Preceded by: James Redman
- Succeeded by: Buddy Johnson
- Constituency: 62nd district (1978–1982); 61st district (1982–1991)

Personal details
- Born: October 13, 1935 (age 90) Plant City, Florida
- Party: Democratic
- Spouse: Marilyn Simmons
- Children: 3
- Education: University of Florida (B.S.P.)
- Occupation: Pharmacist

Carl Carpenter Jr. (born October 13, 1935) is a Democratic politician from Florida who served as a member of the Florida House of Representatives from 1978 to 1991.

Carpenter was born in Plant City, Florida, and attended the University of Florida where he received his BSP. He was a pharmacist and served on the Hillsborough County School Board from 1966 to 1972 and 1976 to 1978, and as a member of the Hillsborough County Commission from 1972 to 1974.

In 1978, Carpenter was elected to the Florida House of Representatives from the 62nd district, succeeding State Representative James Redman. He was re-elected in 1980, and in 1982, following redistricting, he was re-elected unopposed in the 61st district. Carpenter served until 1991, when he resigned from the legislature to serve as Deputy Agriculture Commissioner under Bob Crawford.
