= Richard Glorioso =

American politician

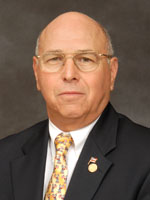

Member of the Florida House of Representatives from the 62nd district
- In office November 2004 – November 2012
- Preceded by: Johnnie Byrd
- Succeeded by: Janet Cruz

Personal details
- Born: November 22, 1943 (age 82)
- Party: Republican
- Spouse: Judy
- Profession: Colonel

Richard Glorioso is a retired United States Air Force Colonel and Plant City, Florida Republican politician who serves as the District 62 Representative in the House of Representatives of the U.S. state of Florida. He was first elected to the Florida House in 2004 and was successively re-elected to three more terms. He had served Plant City as a city commissioner from 1998 to 2004.

Representative was born in Danbury, Connecticut on November 22, 1943. He received his Bachelor of Arts degree in Mathematics from Northeastern University in 1967, the same year he joined the USAF. He received his Master of Arts degree in Management from Central Michigan University in 1974. He retired from the USAF in 1994, the year he moved to Florida. While in the Air Force, he received such medals as the Legion of Merit, Meritorious Service Medal, Combat Readiness Medal, Vietnam Service Medal, and Humanitarian Service Medal.

In 2004, he ran successfully against two other Republicans to win the primary. He then defeated two other candidates, a Libertarian and a Democrat in the general election. During his first term, he sought to restrict where sexual predators could live and to require the schools to teach students the contents of U.S. Constitution.

In 2006, he defeated Democrat Jeremy Zelanes in the general election. In 2008, he again won re-election by default when no opponent filed to run against him and became chair of the committees responsible for transportation and economic development appropriations.

== Sources ==
- Florida House of Representatives Profile
- Project Vote Smart profile
