= James Redman =

American politician (1932–2006)

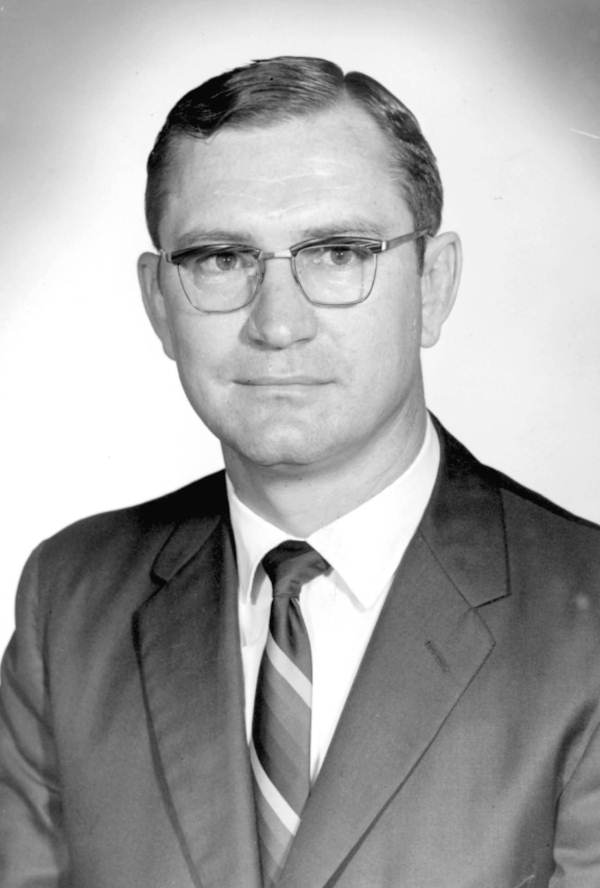

Member of the Florida House of Representatives
- In office November 8, 1966 – November 7, 1978
- Preceded by: Woodie Liles
- Succeeded by: Carl Carpenter Jr.
- Constituency: Hillsborough County Group 1 (1966–1967); 61st district (1967–1972); 62nd district (1972–1978)

Personal details
- Born: January 19, 1932 Plant City, Florida, U.S.
- Died: May 22, 2006 (aged 74) Plant City, Florida, U.S.
- Party: Democratic
- Spouse: Ruby Jean
- Children: 3
- Education: University of Florida (B.S.); University of Florida College of Law (J.D.)
- Occupation: Attorney

James Redman (January 19, 1932 – May 22, 2006) was an American politician from Florida. A member of the Democratic Party, he served as a member of the Florida House of Representatives from 1966 to 1978.

== Life and career ==
Redman was born in Plant City, Florida. He attended the University of Florida.

In 1966, Redman was elected to the Florida House of Representatives. The next year, he was elected as the first representative for the newly established 61st district. He served until 1972, when he was succeeded by Donald Crane. In the same year, he was elected to represent the 62nd district, succeeding Guy Spicola. He served until 1978, when he was succeeded by Carl Carpenter Jr.

Redman died in Plant City, Florida on May 22, 2006, of cancer at the age of 74.
