= Johnnie Byrd =

American politician (born 1951)

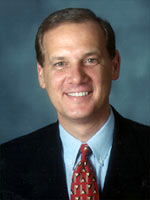

92nd Speaker of the Florida House of Representatives
- In office November 19, 2002 – November 2, 2004
- Preceded by: Tom Feeney
- Succeeded by: Allan Bense

Member of the Florida House of Representatives from the 62nd district
- In office November 5, 1996 – November 2, 2004
- Preceded by: Buddy Johnson
- Succeeded by: Richard Glorioso

Personal details
- Born: February 8, 1951 (age 75) Brewton, Alabama, U.S.
- Party: Republican
- Education: Auburn University (BS); University of Alabama (JD)

Johnnie B. Byrd Jr. (born February 8, 1951) is an American politician who served as a member of the Florida House of Representatives from District 62 representing Eastern Hillsborough County from 1996 through 2004. He was speaker of the House from 2002 to 2004.

In 2004, Byrd made an unsuccessful run for the U.S. Senate seat vacated by retiring Senator Bob Graham as a Republican candidate. He was fourth in a field of six with 68,982 votes, 5.9 percent of the vote. Mel Martinez won the primary and the general election. Prior public service included a spell as a school board member of the Brewton City School System in Brewton, Alabama.

== Personal life ==
Byrd moved to Florida in 1988, and joined the law firm Trinkle, Redman, Moody, Swanson and Byrd. Byrd is currently the managing partner in Byrd & Barnhill, P.L., in Plant City.

He holds a BS in business administration from Auburn University and a JD from the University of Alabama School of Law.

Byrd is the founder and a member of the board of the Johnnie B. Byrd Sr. Alzheimer's Institute at the University of South Florida. He is a past president of the Plant City Chamber of Commerce, a trustee of Evangelical University and Seminary and a member of the Plant City Rotary Club.

In 2012, Byrd ran for Thirteenth Circuit Court Judge, but lost to Mark R. Wolfe. Wolfe received 63.3% of the vote to Byrd's 36.7%.

== Electoral history ==
Date	Position	Status	Opponent	Result	Vote share	Top-opponent vote share
1996	State Representative	Open-seat	Troy Surrency (D)	Elected	65.06%	34.94%
1998	State Representative	Incumbent	Jeff Johnson (D)	Re-elected	77.49%	22.52%
2000	State Representative	Incumbent	John Wayne Clark (D)	Re-elected	66.17%	33.83%
2002	State Representative	Incumbent	Ran unopposed	Re-elected	100.00%	0%
2012	Circuit Court Judge	Incumbent	Mark R. Wolfe	Lost	36.7%	63.3%

United States Senate Republican Primary election in Florida, 2004
Party	Candidate	Votes	%
Republican	Mel Martínez	522,994	44.9%
Republican	Bill McCollum	360,474	30.9%
Republican	Doug Gallagher	158,360	13.6%
Republican	Johnnie Byrd	68,982	5.9%
Republican	Karen Saull	20,365	1.8%
Republican	Sonya March	17,804	1.5%
Republican	Larry Klayman	13,257	1.1%
Republican	William Billy Kogut	3,695	0.3%
Total votes		1,165,931	100.0%

Florida House of Representatives
Preceded by Buddy Johnsonn	Member of the Florida House of Representatives from the 62nd district 1996–2004	Succeeded by Richard Glorioso
Political offices
Preceded by Tom Feeney	Speaker of the Florida House of Representatives; 2002–2004	Succeeded by Allan Bense
