= Cliff Stearns =

American businessman and politician (born 1941)

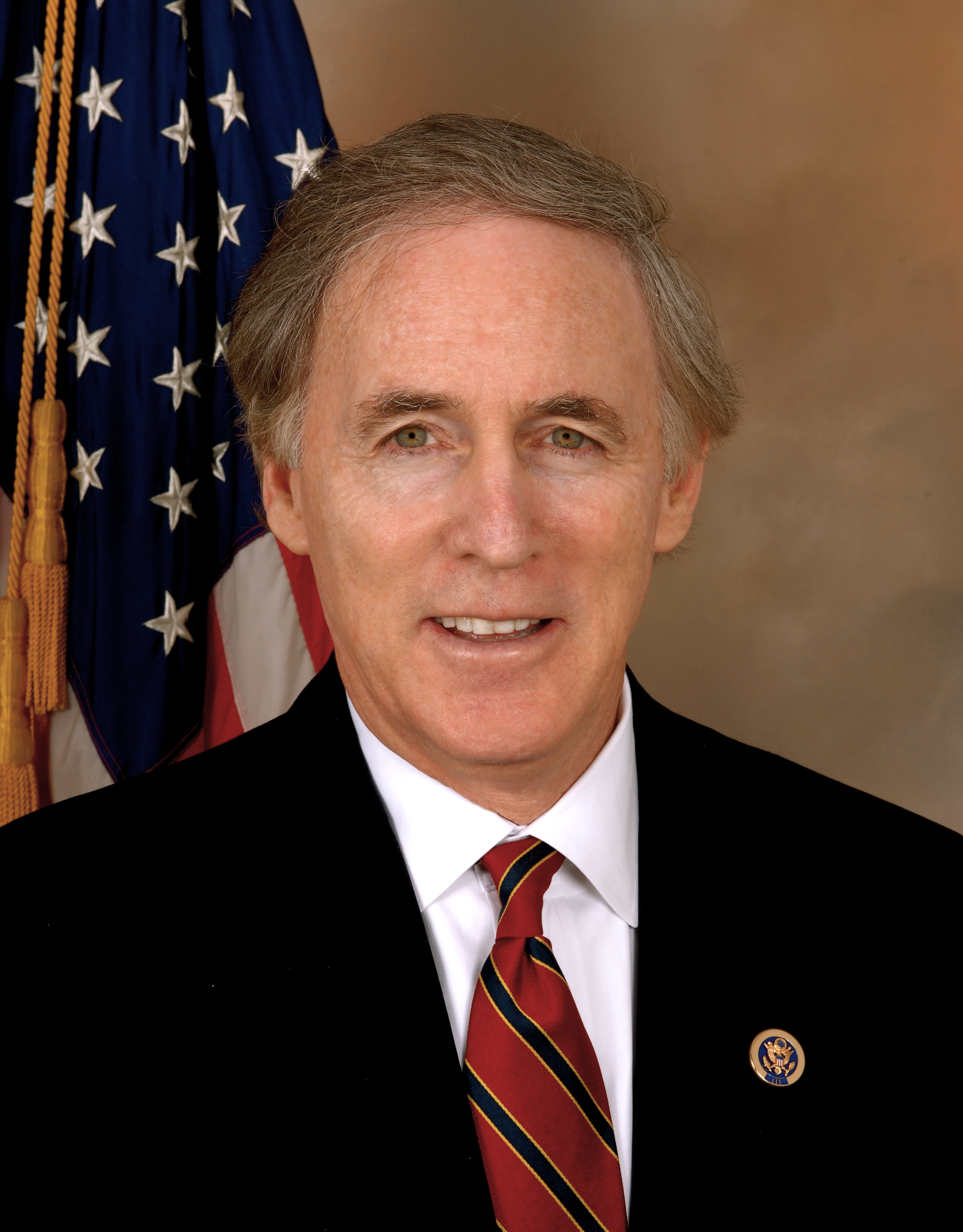

Member of the U.S. House of Representatives from Florida's 6th district
- In office January 3, 1989 – January 3, 2013
- Preceded by: Buddy MacKay
- Succeeded by: Ted Yoho (redistricted)

Personal details
- Born: Clifford Bundy Stearns; April 16, 1941 (age 85) Washington, D.C., U.S.
- Party: Republican
- Spouse: Joan Moore
- Children: 3
- Education: George Washington University (BS); University of California, Los Angeles

Military service
- Branch/service: United States Air Force
- Years of service: 1963–1967
- Rank: Captain
- Awards: Commendation Medal for Meritorious Service
- Stearns's voice Stearns on the establishment of a federal commission to regulate boxing. Recorded November 17, 2005

Clifford Bundy Stearns Sr. (born April 16, 1941) is an American businessman and politician who was the U.S. representative for Florida's 6th congressional district from 1989 to 2013. He is a member of the Republican Party.

Stearns was first elected to Congress in 1988. After 24 years in office, he was defeated in 2012 in a four person Republican primary in a new congressional district by a margin of 1%.

Since leaving Congress, he has worked for APCO Worldwide, a public relations firm headquartered in Washington D.C. Stearns is also a member of APCO Worldwide International Advisory Council. He sits on the boards of the Graduate School of Political Management at The George Washington University, Minority Media & Telecom Council, and the United States Association of Former Members of Congress. He is a past President of the United States Association of Former Members of Congress.

== Early life, education, and business career ==
Stearns was born in Washington, D.C., the son of Emily E. (Newlin) and Clifford Robert Stearns. He was educated at Woodrow Wilson High School, and later earned a degree in electrical engineering from George Washington University. He is also a member of the university's Gamma Beta chapter of Theta Tau, a professional/social engineering fraternity, and participated in the Air Force Reserve Officer Training Corps there and was honored as the Air Force ROTC Distinguished Military Graduate.

Following graduation, he served four years in the United States Air Force as an aerospace engineer in satellite reconnaissance during the Vietnam War. Stearns owned a small chain of motels and restaurants in northern Florida. Before moving to Florida, he worked with a variety of businesses in Florida, such as CBS, Data Control Systems Inc, and Kutola Advertising.

He was also a member of the Engineering Honor Society Sigma Tau, which later merged into the Tau Beta Pi Association which recognizes superior scholarship and/or leadership achievement in the fields of engineering.

In 2012, Stearns donated a collection of his papers to The George Washington University. The collection largely consists of his committee work, but also includes personal and political correspondence, briefing books, and travel agendas. The collection is currently under the care of GW's Special Collections Research Center, located in the Estelle and Melvin Gelman Library.

== U.S. House of Representatives ==
=== Elections ===
1988–2004

In 1988, incumbent Democratic U.S. Congressman Buddy MacKay of Florida's 6th congressional district decided to run for the U.S. Senate. Stearns and Jim Cherry qualified for a run-off election, since no one reached the 50% threshold in the six-candidate primary election. Cherry received 32% to Stearns's 26%. In the run-off, Stearns defeated Cherry 54%–46%. In the general election, Stearns defeated State Representative Jon L. Mills 53%–47%. Until 2012, he never won re-election with less than 59% of the vote.

2006

Stearns was re-elected with 60% of the vote.

2008

Stearns was re-elected with 61% of the vote.

2010

Stearns was re-elected with 71% of the vote.

2012

2012 Republican primary results by county Yoho: 40–50%; 50–60%; 60–70%; Stearns: 40–50%

Redistricting after the 2010 census shifted Stearns' home in Ocala to the 11th District (the old 5th District), but shifted the bulk of his territory to the Gainesville-based 3rd District. Rather than challenge freshman Republican Rich Nugent in the 11th, Stearns opted to run in the 3rd, which contained two-thirds of his former territory.

In the Republican primary for the 3rd—the real contest in this heavily Republican district—Stearns lost to Ted Yoho by only some 800 votes, about 1% of the vote, in the Republican primary.

=== Tenure ===
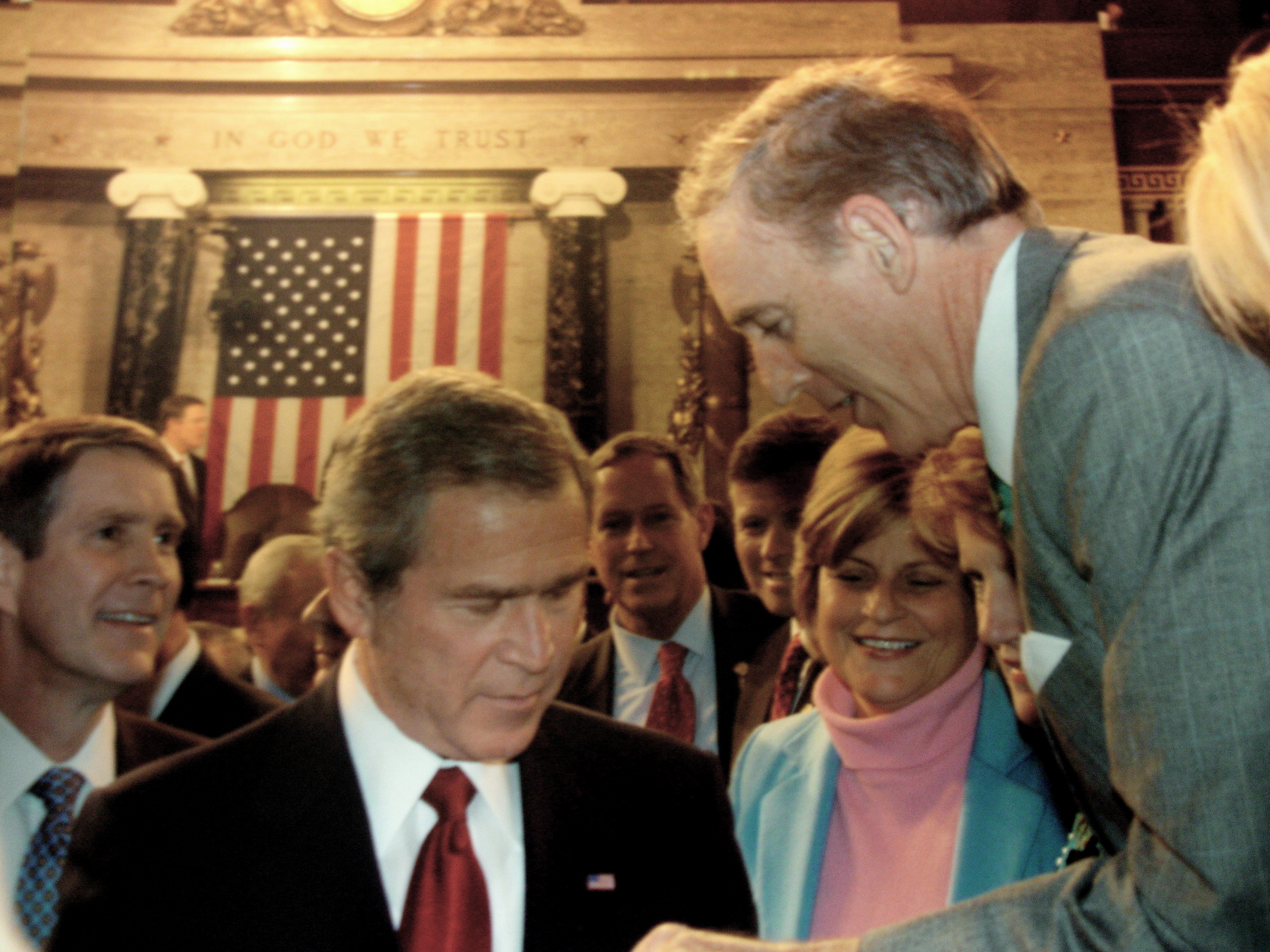
President George W. Bush with Stearns at the 2005 State of the Union Address

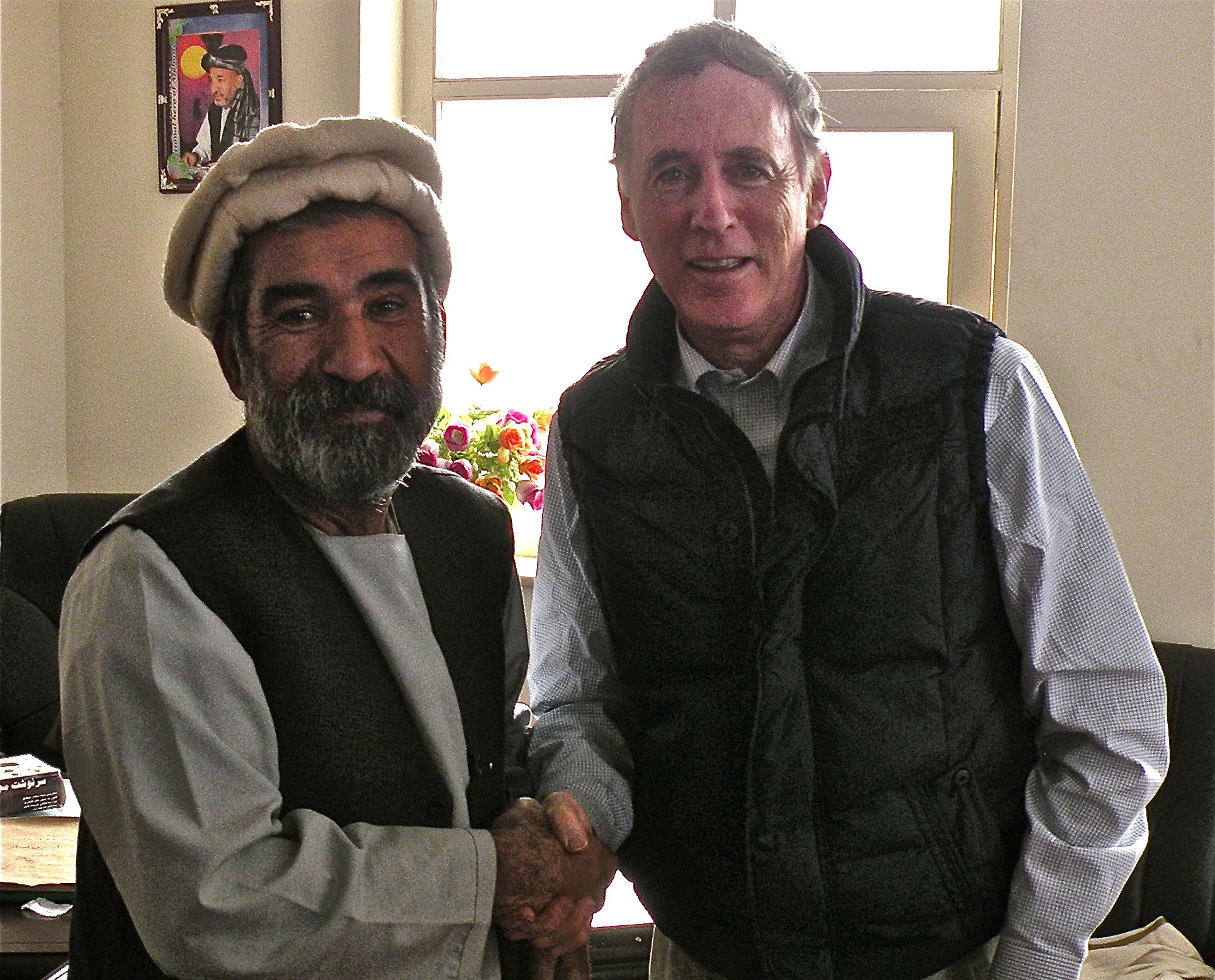
In 2009, Stearns, a co-chair of the Congressional Air Force Caucus, led a delegation to Afghanistan, where he met with Haji Abdul Jabbar, the district governor of Arghandab district. Jabbar was assassinated by the Taliban in 2010.

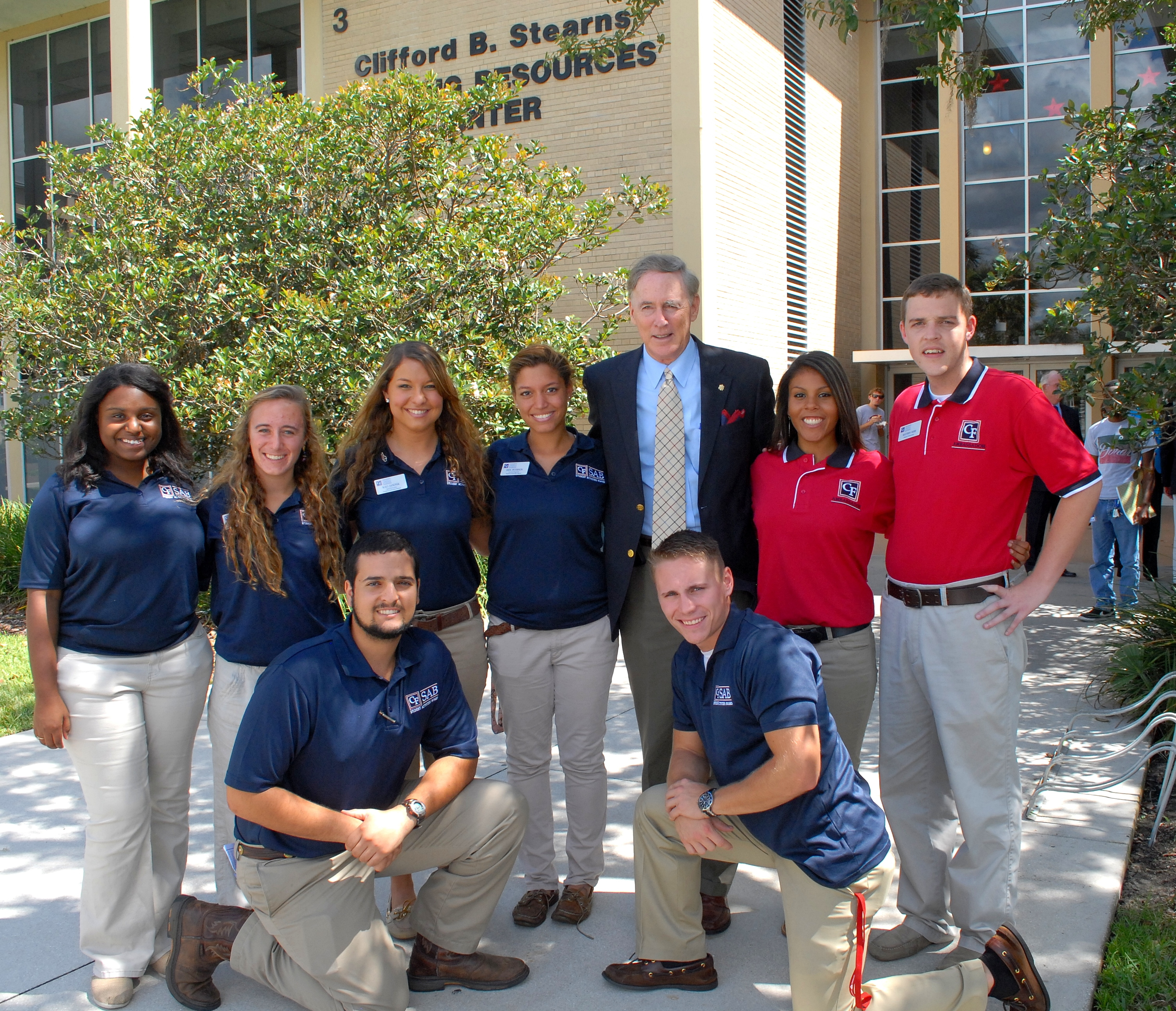
Stearns with College of Central Florida students, 2013

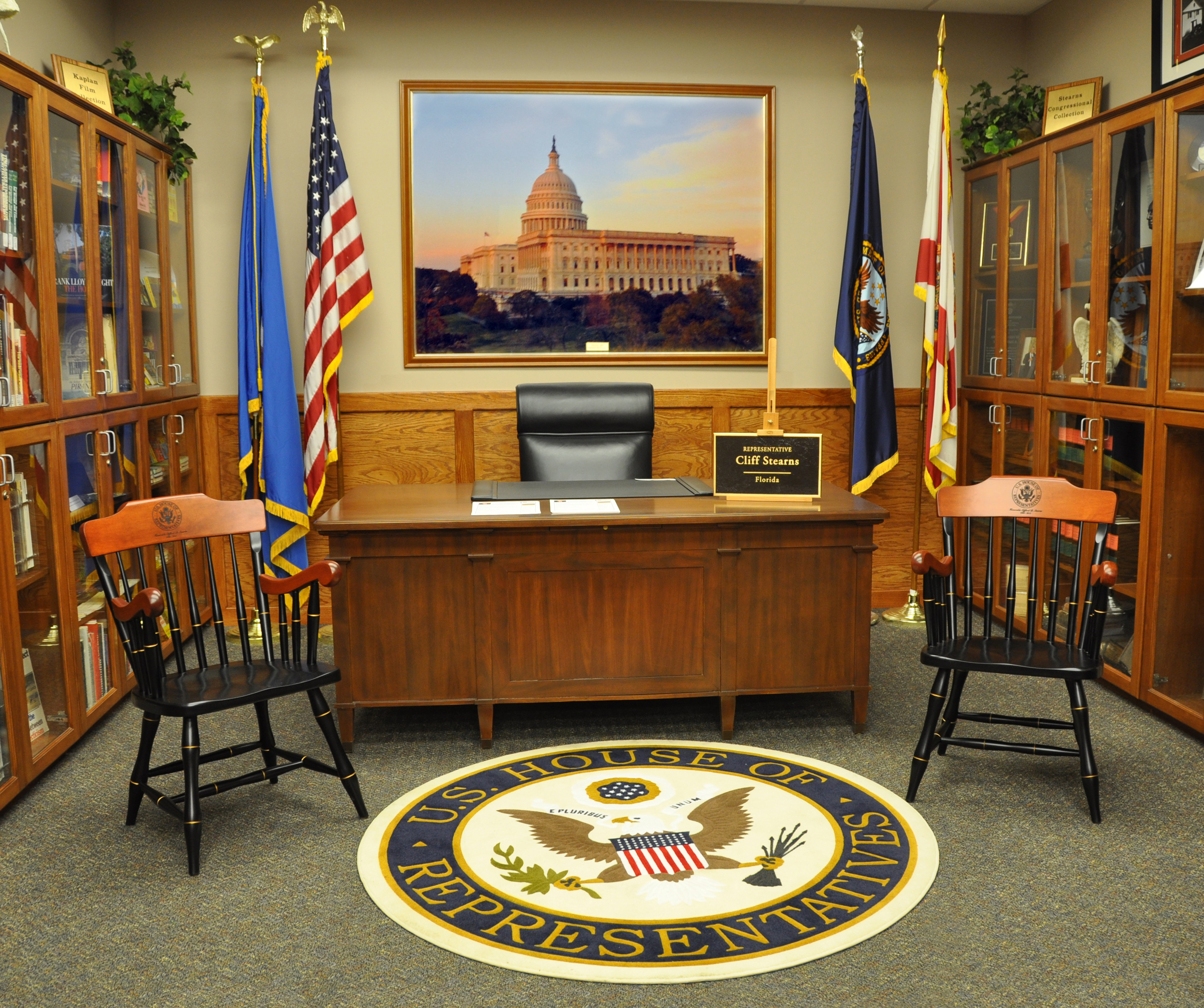
A replica of Stearns' congressional office, 2013

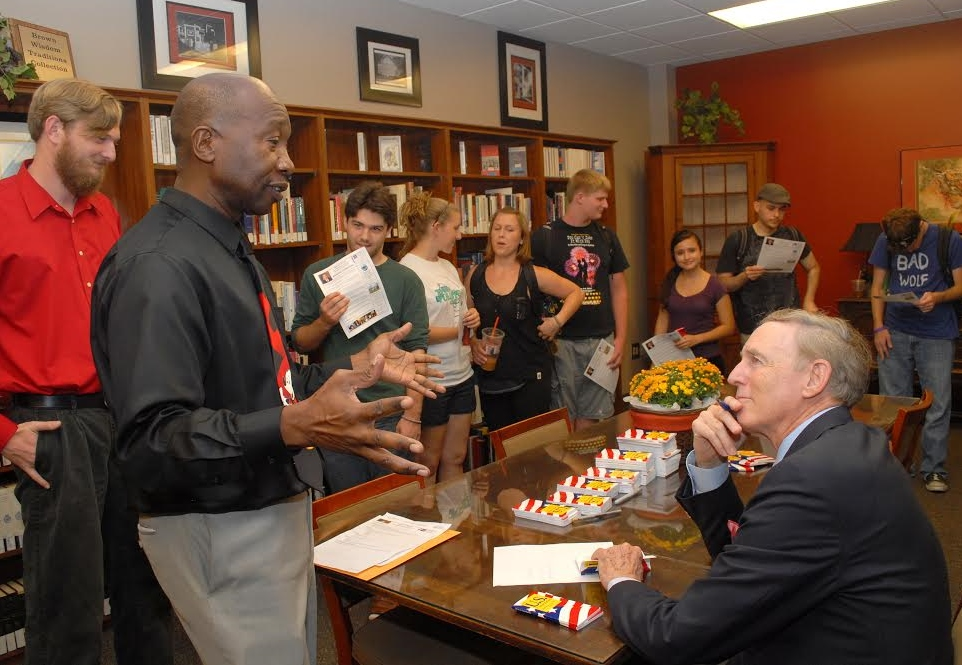
Stearns meeting with College of Central Florida students and faculty during the 2015 Constitution Day event

Stearns is a signer of the Taxpayer Protection Pledge.

Stearns is a member of the Electronic Cigarette Association and supports the use of these products.

On September 29, 2008, Stearns voted against the Emergency Economic Stabilization Act of 2008.

==== Solyndra investigation ====
As Chairman of the House Energy and Commerce Committee's Oversight and Investigations Subcommittee, Stearns led the investigation into the Solyndra loan guarantee, which has resulted in Solyndra declaring bankruptcy and the taxpayers losing $535 million. Among the revelations in the investigation are multiple warnings from government officials against giving Solyndra the loan because the company's health was shaky. Even so, the White House pressed for a speedy review. The company, which faced a highly competitive environment, went bankrupt and was raided by the FBI for possible fraud.

Although the White House instituted an internal review of the loan guarantee program, Stearns believes that the review should have occurred before the Obama administration handed out the money.

Stearns received emails showing that the White House had a major influence on the loan guarantee as well as on the Solyndra loan restructuring that subordinated the taxpayers to two commercial firms in violation of the Energy Policy Act of 2005.

==== Fatal meningitis outbreak of 2012 ====
Stearns led the congressional effort involving the meningitis outbreak. As of November 14, 2012, the Centers for Disease Control and Prevention (CDC) has confirmed 32 deaths and that 438 people have been sickened across 19 states. An investigation determined that the New England Compounding Center(NECC) was the source of the contaminated product. As Chairman of the House Energy and Commerce Committee's Subcommittee on Oversight and Investigations, Stearns held a hearing on this outbreak.

During the hearing, Stearns stated the outbreak was preventable had the U.S. Food and Drug Administration (FDA) acted. The FDA knew of severe quality control violations at NEC as early as 2002, and in 2006 the FDA threatened NECC if it did not comply with regulations. During the hearing, FDA Commissioner Dr. Margaret Hamburg testified that the FDA lacked the authority to close down NECC.

Stearns noted that the FDA had authority to close NECC, but simply failed to protect the American people. Dr. Scott Gottlieb, deputy commissioner of the FDA from 2005 to 2007 and Mr. Sheldon Bradshaw, FDA's chief counsel during that same period, disagreed strongly with Hamburg. In a Wall Street Journal op-ed on November 13, 2012, they stated unequivocally that FDA did have enough authority and could have acted but chose not to because of FDA's desire to regulate "the full scope of the practice of pharmacy." They further stated that NECC's illegal actions, which FDA was aware of, that "put the NECC firmly in violation of FDA rules-if the agency had chosen to enforce existing provisions."

==== Abortion ====
As Chairman of the Energy & Commerce Subcommittee on Oversight and Investigations, Stearns conducted the first-ever oversight on taxpayer funding of Planned Parenthood, the largest abortion provider in the United States. The largest source of revenue for Planned Parenthood is government funding, but federal funds can't be used for abortions. Many women depend on Planned Parenthood for essential health care like birth control, STD tests, pelvic exams, cancer screenings, and pregnancy-related services. The investigation was started in response to an investigative report released in July 2011 by the anti-abortion organization Americans United for Life (AUL). According to AUL, "Audits of Planned Parenthood affiliates in California, New Jersey, New York, and Washington State demonstrate a pattern of overbilling and abuse involving Medicaid funds, and in at least Washington even charging drugs used in an abortion as 'family planning.' Furthermore, State audit reports and admissions by former Planned Parenthood employees detail a pattern of misuse of federal funds by some Planned Parenthood affiliates."

The investigation was sweeping, requesting internal audits dating back 12 years and state audits for the past 20 years for the national organization and all 83 of its affiliates. Representative Henry Waxman questioned the political motivations for the timing of the investigation, saying, "Your fervent ideological opposition to Planned Parenthood does not justify launching this intrusive investigation."

On January 31, 2012, The Susan G. Komen for the Cure organization stopped funding Planned Parenthood, stating that the congressional investigation by Stearns triggered a newly created internal rule about not funding organizations under any federal, state or local investigation. Planned Parenthood is regularly audited to ensure compliance with the Hyde Amendment: these audits have never turned up any evidence of wrongdoing. While the move was applauded by conservative anti-abortion groups, it was denounced by several newspaper editorials, women's health advocacy groups, and politicians. Four days later, Komen's Board of Directors reversed the decision and announced that it would amend the policy to "make clear that disqualifying investigations must be criminal and conclusive in nature and not political". Karen Handel, Komen's vice president for public policy, resigned as a result of Komen's reversal.

==== Economic issues ====
Stearns held several economic roundtables throughout the district, meeting with business owners, bankers, and realtors to get their views on improving the creating of jobs. Last year, he sponsored four homeowner workshops in Ocala, Gainesville, Jacksonville, and Orange Park. He brought in realtors, bankers, and mortgage experts to help people who are having trouble making their payments – they also provided essential information for first-time homebuyers.

In meeting with community bankers from Florida, he learned that 70% of Florida's community banks are under some kind of regulatory order that reduce capital for businesses to grow and loans to revitalize the housing industry.

He took a leadership role for the Florida delegation in sending a letter to Federal Deposit Insurance Corporation (FDIC) Chairman Sheila Bair, claiming that banking examiners may be pursuing an unreasonably tough analysis of Florida banks’ asset quality and are regularly requiring downgrades of performing loans.

==== Fiscal issues ====
Stearns was one of only 39 House members to receive an "A" rating from the National Taxpayers Union (NTU). In addition, in 2010 Citizens Against Government Waste once again named Stearns a "Taxpayer Hero."

Stearns also is a strong opponent of automatic congressional pay raises. He also offered legislation to prevent a pay increase in a year following a federal budget deficit.

In fiscal years 2008–2010, Stearns sponsored 46 earmarks totaling $85,810,100.

Stearns voted for Cut, Cap & Balance & the Boehner Debt Ceiling Bill; however, he voted against the final Debt Ceiling compromise bill (The "Budget Control Act of 2011").

==== Veterans issues ====
Throughout his tenure, Stearns served on the Veterans Affairs Committee. He advocates for increased funding for the VA and pushed to establish a VA cemetery in the Jacksonville area. He supports the VA's CARES plan to develop a new Regional Health Care Facility in Marion County and the expansion of the VA Hospital in Gainesville with a new 230-bed patient tower. The groundbreaking for this addition occurred in 2008. His Veterans Millennium Health care & Benefits Act and language from his VA Health Care Personnel Act to increase pay for VA health professionals were signed into law.

==== Technology and privacy ====
Stearns has been working on extending privacy protection for about 10 years. In 2003, the International Association of Privacy Professionals gave Stearns its Privacy Leadership Award for his efforts on leadership, including holding the most extensive hearings on privacy issues as Chairman of the Commerce, Trade & Consumer Protection Subcommittee.

On April 13, 2011, Stearns offered bi-partisan legislation to protect consumer privacy on line—H.R. 1528, the Consumer Privacy Protection Act. The goal is to encourage greater levels of electronic commerce by providing to Internet users the assurance that their experience online will be more secure.

Stearns also is a leader in opposing net neutrality.

Stearns voted for the Patriot Act.

Stearns is the Chairman of the Energy and Commerce Committee's Oversight and Investigations Subcommittee. From 2001 until 2007, Stearns was Chairman of the Commerce, Trade, and Consumer Protection Subcommittee and he still serves on the Subcommittee. He helped to create the Do-Not-Call List to protect consumers from unwanted telephone solicitations and legislation to combat spyware, which is software that allows a third party to monitor the computer use of individuals without their knowledge.

==== Energy issues ====
Stearns was a member of the Renewable Energy and Energy Efficiency Caucus, a bi-partisan forum for discussing and disseminating information about renewable energy and energy efficiency technologies. Stearns’ paper on developing clean-coal technology and applying coal-to-liquid technology was published in December 2008 in the Stanford Law & Policy Review.

During consideration of cap-and-trade legislation in the Energy and Commerce Committee in May 2009, Stearns offered an amendment to afford existing nuclear power plants the same benefits provided to new nuclear power plants in the bill. The amendment simply recognized that nuclear is carbon free and did not provide any new subsidy to the industry.

In 2008, Stearns joined in offering a package of bills to increase domestic energy production. This included more domestic oil and gas production, greater use of clean-coal technology, reducing the barriers to new nuclear power plants, and encouraging renewable energy sources.

==== Health care ====
During consideration of the health care legislation, Stearns offered the following amendments:

- Provide tax deduction for health care;
- Require the President, Supreme Court Justices, and Members of Congress to buy their coverage of the Exchange:
- Eliminate the tax on medical devices;
- Repeal the cuts to Medicare Advantage.

==== 9/11 first responders ====
During the debate over compensation for 9/11 first responders and others, Stearns advocated a "standard re-authorization and appropriation process". Congressman Stearns submitted an amendment that was adopted without opposition to H.R.#847, the James Zadroga 9/11 Health and Compensation Act of 2010, that would screen thousands of non-first responders and First Responders who submit claims for chronic medical conditions against a Department of Homeland Security terrorist watch list (original committee markup referenced).

=== Committee assignments ===
- Committee on Energy and Commerce
  - Subcommittee on Commerce, Manufacturing and Trade
  - Subcommittee on Communications and Technology
  - Subcommittee on Oversight and Investigations (Chair)
- Committee on Veterans' Affairs
  - Subcommittee on Health
  - Subcommittee on Oversight and Investigations

=== Caucus memberships ===
- Chronic Obstructive Pulmonary Disease Caucus (Co-chairman)
- Congressional Cystic Fibrosis Caucus (Co-chairman)
- Congressional Horse Caucus (Co-chairman)
- Congressional Air Force Caucus (Co-chairman)
- Transatlantic Legislators Dialogue (Vice-chairman)
- Biomedical Research Caucus
- Bipartisan Congressional Pro Life Caucus
- Bipartisan Privacy Caucus
- Canada-US Interparliamentary Union
- Community College Caucus
- Congressional Caucus on Adoption
- Congressional Caucus on Hellenic Issues
- Congressional Caucus on India and Indian-Americans
- Congressional Caucus on Poland
- Congressional Caucus on Taiwan
- Congressional Caucus on US-Turkey Relations and Turkish Americans
- Congressional Cyber Security Caucus
- Congressional Friends of Liechtenstein Caucus
- Congressional Invisible Wounds Caucus
- Congressional Internet Caucus
- Congressional Israel Allies Caucus
- Congressional Media Fairness Caucus
- Congressional Prayer Caucus
- Congressional Ship Building Caucus
- Congressional Singapore Caucus
- Congressional Sovereignty Caucus
- Congressional Sportsmen's Caucus
- Congressional Travel and Tourism Caucus
- Congressional Wireless Caucus
- House Renewable Energy and Energy Efficiency Caucus
- Immigration Reform Caucus
- New Media Caucus
- Republican Study Committee
- Tea Party Caucus

== Personal life ==
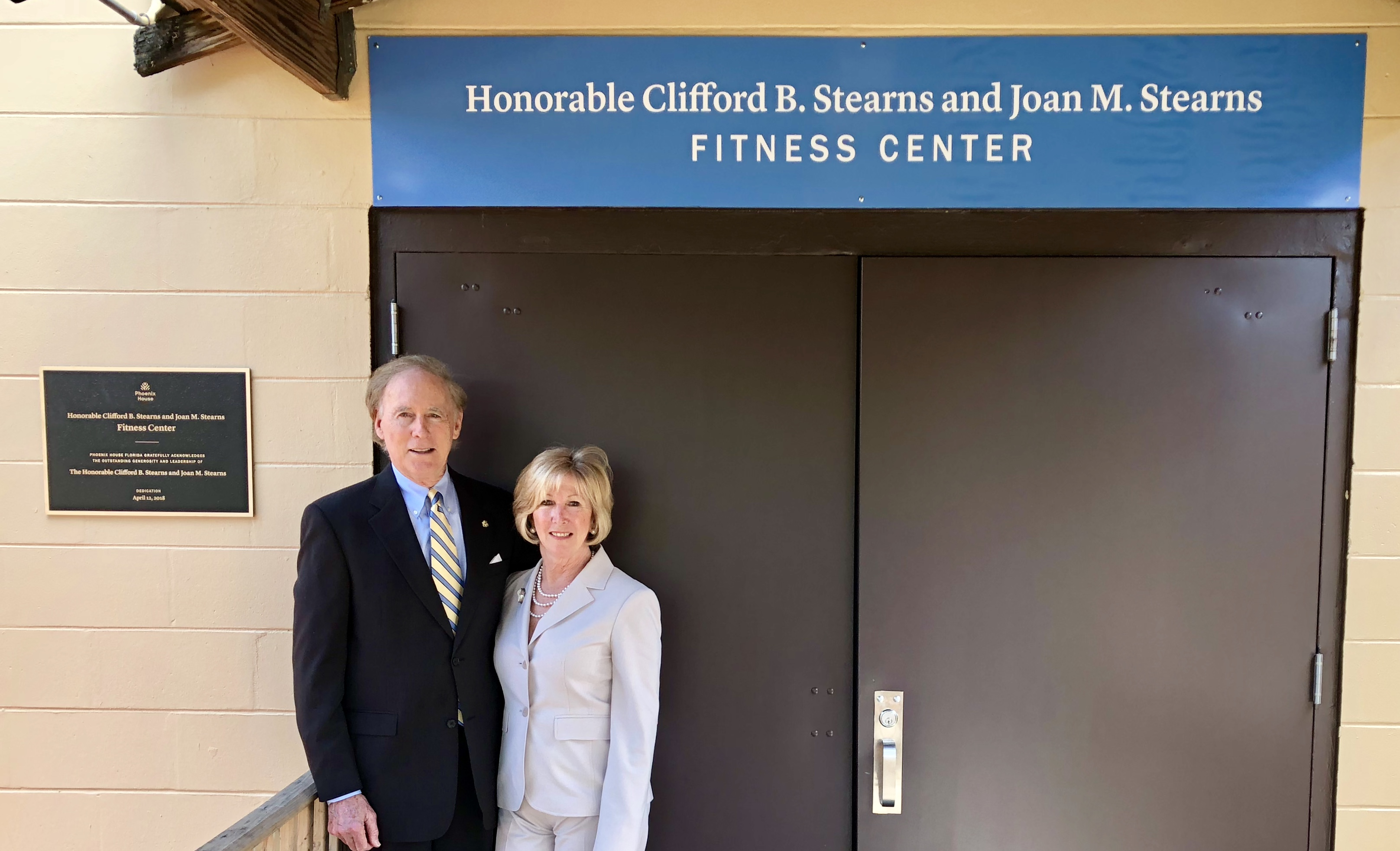
Cliff and Joan Stearns at the dedication of a fitness center House in Citra, Florida, 2018

Stearns lives in Ocala, Florida with his wife, Joan (née Moore). They have three grown sons. One of his great-great-grandfathers was 19th century Ohio congressman Hezekiah S. Bundy. He is a Presbyterian.

While a Member of Congress, Stearns received the Air Force Association W. Stuart Symington Award, the highest honor presented to a civilian in the field of national security for his work in behalf of the United States Air Force.

== Authorship/Publications ==
“Life in the Marble Palace (In Praise of Folly), published by FriesenPress, 2016, http://www.cliffordstearns.com

· “Creating a Legal Framework for Sustainable Energy,” Stanford Law Review & Policy Symposium 19, no. 3 (2008).

· Featured opinion editorials in all major Washington, DC, newspapers.

· Articles in Roll Call and The Hill weekly newspapers.

· Developed computer software for determining savings rates and future values: “Finance Kit.”

· Published Keynote Address at Harvard University Privacy Symposium, Cambridge, MA (August 19, 2008).

· “The Heritage of Our Right to Bear Arms,” Saint Louis University Public Law Review XVIII, no. 1 (1999).

· Inside Impeachment—Diary of a Congressman: Lessons Learned published by Archway Publishing 2023, https://www.cliffstearns.org

U.S. House of Representatives
Preceded by Buddy Mackay	Member of the U.S. House of Representatives from Florida's 6th congressional district 1989–2013	Succeeded by Ron DeSantis
U.S. order of precedence (ceremonial)
Preceded by Michael Bilirakis as Former U.S. Representative	Order of precedence of the United States as Former U.S. Representative	Succeeded by Corrine Brown as Former U.S. Representative
