= Phyllis Busansky =

American politician (1937–2009)

Hillsborough County, Florida Supervisor of Elections
- In office January 6, 2009 – June 23, 2009
- Preceded by: Buddy Johnson
- Succeeded by: Earl Lennard

Hillsborough County Commissioner
- In office 1989–1997

Personal details
- Born: March 3, 1937 Hartford, Connecticut, U.S.
- Died: June 23, 2009 (aged 72) St. Augustine, Florida, U.S.
- Party: Democratic
- Spouse: Sheldon Busansky
- Children: 3
- Education: Wheaton College

Phyllis Busansky (March 3, 1937 – June 23, 2009) was the Democratic Commissioner of Hillsborough County, Florida from 1989 to 1997. In 1995 she was named a "Public Official of the Year" by Governing magazine. In 2006, she ran in Florida’s 9th district congressional race, unsuccessfully. She defeated incumbent Buddy Johnson in the November 2008 election for Hillsborough Supervisor of Elections.

Busansky served Hillsborough County in a number of roles including Aging Services Director, Human Resources Director, County Commissioner. She was the first Executive Director of Florida's welfare-to-work agency (WAGES), under former Governors Lawton Chiles and Jeb Bush. The agency had a $1.2 billion annual budget.

== Death ==
Busansky, 72, a native of Hartford, Connecticut, was attending the Florida State Association of Supervisor of Elections conference in St. Augustine, Florida with members of her staff. When she didn't show up for the conference, coworkers came looking for her, and found her dead in her hotel room.
