= List of mayors of Orlando, Florida =

Mayor of Orlando
- Seal of the City of Orlando

- Flag of the City of Orlando

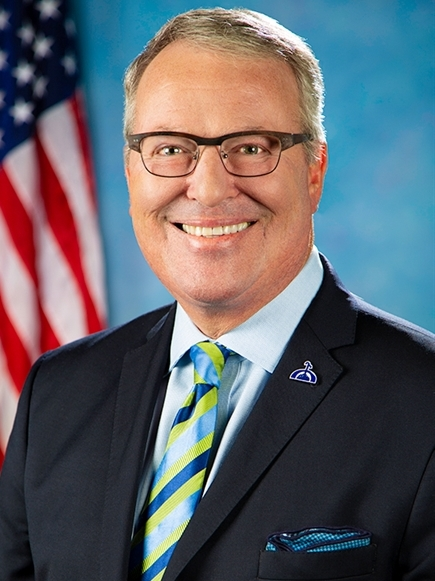
- Incumbent; Buddy Dyer since March 1, 2003
- Style: The Honorable
- Seat: Orlando City Hall
- Term length: Four years
- Inaugural holder: William Jackson Brack
- Formation: 1875
- Salary: $186,306
- Website: Official website

The city of Orlando, Florida, was incorporated in 1875. The first mayor, William Jackson Brack, took office in 1875. The Orlando mayor is officially a nonpartisan election.

The current mayor is Buddy Dyer, who was first elected in a special election in February 2003. Dyer was elected to his first full term in 2004, and after a brief suspension for six weeks in 2005, has subsequently been re-elected in 2008, 2012, 2015, 2019, and 2023.

== List of mayors ==
Mayors of Orlando, Florida
No.	Name	Portrait	Term start	Term end
1	William Jackson Brack		1875	1877
2	John Howard Allen		1877	1878
3	Charles Henry Munger		1878	1879
4	Alex M. Hyer		1879	1880
5	Robert L. Summerlin		1878	1882
6	Charles Dennison Sweet		1881	1882
7	Cassius Aurelius Boone		1882	1883
8	John Letcher Bryan		1883	1885
9	Ephraim J. Reel		1885	1887
10	Foster Samuel Chapman		1887	1888
11	Matthew Robinson Marks		1888	1891
12	Willis Lucullus Palmer		1891	1893
13	Mahlon Gore		1893	1896
14	James B. Parramore		1896	1902
15	Clarence Everett Howard		1902	1902
16	B. M. Robinson		1902	1904
17	James Horace Smith		1904	1906
18	Braxton Beacham		1906	1907
19	William Henry Jewell		1907	1910
20	William Hayden Reynolds		1910	1913
21	E. Frank Sperry		1913	1916
22	James LeRoy Giles		1916	1920
23	Eugene Goodman Duckworth		January 1, 1920	March 5, 1924
24	James LeRoy Giles		April 2, 1924	January 1, 1926
25	Latta Malette Autrey		January 1, 1926	January 1, 1929
26	James LeRoy Giles		January 1, 1929	January 1, 1932
27	Samuel Yulee Way		January 1, 1932	January 1, 1935
28	V. W. Estes		January 1, 1935	January 1, 1938
29	Samuel Yulee Way		January 1, 1938	January 1, 1941
30	William Beardall		January 1, 1941	January 1, 1953
31	J. Rolfe Davis		January 1, 1953	November 1, 1956
32	Bob Carr		November 1, 1956	January 29, 1967
-	George Barker (acting)		January 29, 1967	March 8, 1967
33	Carl T. Langford		March 15, 1967	January 1, 1981
-	Don Crenshaw (acting)		November 1, 1980	November 2, 1980
34	Bill Frederick		January 1, 1981	November 1, 1992
35	Glenda Hood		November 1, 1992	March 1, 2003
36	Buddy Dyer		March 1, 2003	
x	Ernest Page (interim)		March 11, 2005	April 20, 2005
36	Buddy Dyer		April 20, 2005	Incumbent

=== Notes ===
- City commissioner G. H. Sutherland served as acting mayor after Eugene Goodman Duckworth resigned in the wake of a failed city commissioners recall election. Sutherland served for about four weeks until a special election was held. Former mayor James LeRoy Giles won the special election and served out the remainder of the term.
- Ernest Page was appointed interim mayor for about six weeks in March–April 2005 while Buddy Dyer was under investigation for election fraud stemming from the 2004 election. The charges against Dyer were dismissed, and Dyer was reinstated as mayor on April 20, 2005.

== See also ==
- Timeline of Orlando, Florida
