= 2012 United States elections =

- ← 2010 2011 2012 2013 2014 → Presidential election year
- Election day: November 6
- Incumbent president: ▌Barack Obama (D)
- Next Congress: 113th

Presidential election
- Partisan control: Democratic hold
- Popular vote margin: Democratic +3.9%
- Electoral vote
- Barack Obama (D): 332
- Mitt Romney (R): 206
- Presidential election results map. Blue denotes states/districts won by Democrat Barack Obama, and Red denotes those won by Republican Mitt Romney. Numbers indicate electoral votes allotted to the winner of each state.

Senate elections
- Overall control: Democratic hold
- Seats contested: 33 of 100 seats
- Net seat change: Democratic +2
- 2012 Senate election results map Democratic hold Republican hold Independent hold Democratic gain Republican gain Independent gain

House elections
- Overall control: Republican hold
- Seats contested: All 435 seats
- Popular vote margin: Democratic +1.2%
- Net seat change: Democratic +8
- 2012 House election results map Democratic hold Republican hold Democratic gain Republican gain

Gubernatorial elections
- Seats contested: 14 (12 states, 2 territories) (including a recall election in Wisconsin)
- Net seat change: Republican +1
- 2012 gubernatorial election results map Democratic hold Republican gain Republican hold (including recall); Popular Democratic gain Nonpartisan

Elections were held in the United States on November 6, 2012. Democratic President Barack Obama won reelection to a second term and the Democrats gained seats in both chambers of Congress, retaining control of the Senate even though the Republican Party retained control of the House of Representatives. As of 2024, this is the most recent election cycle in which neither the presidency nor a chamber of Congress changed partisan control, the last time the incumbent party won the presidential election, and the last time that the party that won the presidency simultaneously gained seats in both the House of Representatives and the Senate.

Obama defeated Republican nominee Mitt Romney to win a second term, taking 51.1 percent of the popular vote and 332 of the 538 electoral votes. Romney defeated Rick Santorum, Newt Gingrich, and several other candidates to win his party's nomination in the 2012 Republican primaries.

Democrats won a net gain of two Senate seats, retaining control of the chamber. In the first election held in the House of Representatives since the round of redistricting following the 2010 United States census, Democrats picked up eight seats but failed to gain a majority, despite winning the popular vote. In the gubernatorial elections, Republicans won a net gain of one seat. This was the first time since 1936 where a second-term Democratic president had coattails in both houses of Congress on both occasions. (Note: Although Franklin D. Roosevelt won a third and fourth term in 1940 and 1944, respectively, he lost Senate seats on both occasions.) Moreover, this is the third straight presidential election cycle where the winner had coattails in both houses of Congress.

Various other state, territorial, and local races and referendums were held throughout the year. Three state referendums passed legalizing same-sex marriage, while Minnesota became the first state in history to reject a proposed state-level constitutional ban of same sex marriage. Two states approved and one rejected the legalization of recreational marijuana, and one more state voted to legalize marijuana for medical use. A referendum was also held in Puerto Rico regarding the future political status of the U.S. unincorporated territory. Following the Supreme Court's Citizens United decision, the 2012 election season became the most expensive in American history.

== Issues ==
Despite various issues during this election cycle, ultimately little overall change occurred on both the Federal and the gubernatorial levels.

=== Unresolved issues from 2008 and 2010 ===
Many of the major issues of the 2012 election were the same as in both 2008 and 2010. Candidates and voters in 2012 were again focused on national economic conditions and jobs, record federal deficits, health care and the effects of the controversial Affordable Care Act, national security and terrorism, education, and energy.

Immigration reform and the controversial Arizona Senate Bill 1070, passed by the state in 2010 to enhance the power of Arizona's law enforcement agencies to investigate the immigration status of suspected illegal immigrants, also remained important issues. On June 25, 2012, the Supreme Court delivered its decision in Arizona v. United States, striking down three of the four provisions of Arizona's law.

=== Wisconsin collective bargaining dispute ===
In 2011, there were a series of demonstrations in Wisconsin, involving at its zenith as many as 100,000 protestors opposing the 2011 Wisconsin Act 10, also called the "Wisconsin budget repair bill." The legislation, passed by the Wisconsin Legislature on June 29, 2011, primarily impacted the following areas: collective bargaining, compensation, retirement, health insurance, and sick leave of the state's public sector employees.

These protests became a major driving force of multiple recall elections, including state senators in 2011 and 2012, Governor Scott Walker in 2012 and a contentious Wisconsin Supreme Court election in 2011.

=== Rape and pregnancy controversies and the "war on women" ===
Starting in August 2012, a series of controversies occurred involving comments made by a number of socially conservative Republican candidates regarding issues regarding rape, pregnancy, and abortion, bringing these issues to the forefront. The first most notable was Republican House Representative Todd Akin of Missouri, who was the Republican nominee for a U.S. Senate seat. He stated that pregnancy from rape rarely occurs as a result of what he referred to as "legitimate rape." Akin's comments had a far-reaching political impact, changing a focus of campaigns across the country onto the so-called "war on women." Another widely covered comment was that of Indiana State Treasurer and U.S. Senate candidate Richard Mourdock, who said that pregnancy from rape was "something that God intended". A number of observers later identified Mourdock's and Akin's comments as a principal factor in their respective election losses. The comments are also credited for having a larger national effect.

=== Benghazi attack ===
The major foreign policy controversy during the final weeks of the campaign was the September attack on the American diplomatic mission at Benghazi, Libya by a heavily armed group. Four people were killed, including U.S. Ambassador J. Christopher Stevens, and ten others were injured. This was initially blamed on a series of protests and violent attacks began in response to a YouTube trailer for the controversial film Innocence of Muslims, considered blasphemous by many Muslims. According to critics, the consulate site should have been secured better both before and after the attack. Republicans further criticized the Obama administration's response to the attacks, ranging from accusations that they incorrectly attributed the role of anger over the film instead of suspecting it more as a coordinated attack by a terrorist group like al-Qaeda; to complaints with delays in the administration's investigation.

== Federal elections ==
=== Presidential election ===
Democratic incumbent president Barack Obama was re-elected, defeating Republican former Massachusetts Governor Mitt Romney. This was the first presidential election since the 2010 census, which changed the Electoral College vote apportionment.

With the advantage of incumbency, Obama faced no major challengers in the Democratic Party primaries. Several candidates competed in the Republican Party primaries; by late April, Romney, a former governor of Massachusetts, was declared the presumptive Republican nominee. Among the third-party candidates, former governor of New Mexico Gary Johnson was the Libertarian Party nominee, Jill Stein was the Green Party nominee, former Member of the U.S. House of Representatives from Virginia's 5th congressional district Virgil Goode was the Constitution Party nominee, and former mayor of Salt Lake City Rocky Anderson was the Justice Party nominee.

=== Congressional elections ===
==== Senate elections ====
The 33 seats of Class I of the United States Senate were up for election. Democrats were expected to have 23 seats up for election, including 2 independents who caucus with the Democrats, while Republicans were only expected to have 10 seats up for election. The Democrats ended up retaining majority control of the Senate, picking up two net seats. One of the Democratic winners was Wisconsin's Tammy Baldwin, who became the first openly LGBT member of the US Senate.

==== House of Representatives elections ====
This was the first congressional election using the congressional districts that were apportioned based on the 2010 census. Elections were held for all 435 seats in the United States House of Representatives. Elections were also held for the delegates from the District of Columbia and five major U.S. territories. Although House Democrats won a plurality of the popular vote (48.8% vs 47.6%), House Republicans were still able to retain a 234 to 201 seat majority.

A special election in Oregon's 1st congressional district was held on January 31 to determine a replacement for David Wu, who resigned in August 2011. Another special election in Arizona's 8th congressional district was held on June 12 to elect the replacement of Gabby Giffords, who resigned in January 2012. The winners of these two special elections (Suzanne Bonamici from Oregon, Ron Barber from Arizona) both ran in attempts to keep their seats.

As a matter of convenience and cost saving, the special election in New Jersey's 10th congressional district and the special election in Michigan's 11th congressional district were held in conjunction with the regularly scheduled general election on November 6, 2012. New Jersey congressman Donald M. Payne died in March 2012 while Michigan's Thaddeus McCotter resigned in July 2012. In both districts, voters were asked on the November ballot to select two candidates: one to serve the remainder of Payne or McCotter's term, respectively, and the other to serve their respective district's full 2-year term beginning in January 2013.

== State and territorial elections ==
=== Gubernatorial elections ===
12 state and two territory governorships were up for election. In addition, Scott Walker of Wisconsin survived a recall election on June 5. Only one state governorship changed hands: In North Carolina, Republican Pat McCrory was elected to replace the retiring Democratic governor Bev Perdue.

The territorial governorships of American Samoa and Puerto Rico were also up for election. Senator Alejandro García Padilla won in Puerto Rico, and Lolo Matalasi Moliga won in American Samoa.

=== Other statewide elections ===
In many states where if the following positions are elective offices, voters will cast votes for candidates for the state executive branch offices of Lieutenant Governor (though some will be voted for on the same ticket as the gubernatorial nominee), Secretary of state, state Treasurer, state Auditor, state Attorney General, state Superintendent of Education, Commissioners of Insurance, Agriculture, or Labor, etc., and state judicial branch offices (seats on state Supreme Courts and, in some states, state appellate courts).

=== State and territorial legislative elections ===
13 chambers shifted party control, as Republicans had gained many chambers in the 2010 mid-term elections, and this was seen as a modest rebalancing.

Democrats won the Colorado House of Representatives, Maine Senate, Maine House of Representatives, Minnesota Senate, Minnesota House of Representatives, New Hampshire House of Representatives, and Oregon House of Representatives that was previously tied. Meanwhile, Republicans won the Wisconsin Senate which was briefly under Democratic control after multiple recall elections earlier in the year, and both chambers of the Arkansas legislature for the first time since 1874. The Alaska Senate went from a Democratic-led coalition to Republican control. The Washington Senate went from Democratic control to a Republican-led coalition, and the New York State Senate went from Republican control to a Republican-led coalition.

=== Puerto Rican status referendum ===
A referendum regarding the political status of Puerto Rico was held. Puerto Rican voters were asked two questions: First, whether they prefer the status quo of remaining a U.S. unincorporated territory—a majority (54%), rejected the status quo. The second question asked whether they prefer statehood, independence or free association—a majority (61% of votes cast) supported statehood for Puerto Rico.

However, one-third of all votes cast left the second question blank. Governor-elect Alejandro García Padilla, who had been critical of the process, then sent a message to President Obama, asking him to reject the results because of their ambiguity. On November 8, 2012, Washington, D.C. newspaper The Hill published an article saying that Congress will also likely ignore the results of the referendum due to the circumstances behind the votes.

=== State and territory initiatives and referendums ===
Vote for same-sex marriage initiative by counties in Maryland, Maine, and Washington: Vote for same-sex marriage ban by counties in Minnesota: 70–80% 60–70% 50–60% Vote against same-sex marriage initiative by counties in Maryland, Maine, and Washington: Vote against same-sex marriage ban by counties in Minnesota: 70–80% 60–70% 50–60% <50%

Maine, Maryland and Washington approved same sex marriage by popular vote, the first time any states have done so, bringing the number of states that allow same sex marriage from 6 to 9 states. In Minnesota, a proposed constitutional amendment to ban same sex marriage was defeated, the first time such an amendment has not passed.

A measure in Massachusetts resulted in that state becoming the 18th US state to allow medical cannabis. By ballot measure, voters in both Colorado and Washington chose to legalize cannabis outright, the first states to do so, whereas voters in Oregon chose to reject it.

== Local elections ==
Nationwide, cities, counties, school boards, special districts and others held elections in 2012.

Some of the major American cities that held mayoral elections in 2012 included:

- Carson City, Nevada: Incumbent Bob Crowell won re-election.
- Honolulu, Hawaii: Incumbent Peter Carlisle was defeated in the non-partisan blanket primary in August. Former state representative Kirk Caldwell then defeated former Hawaii Governor Ben Cayetano in the runoff.
- Milwaukee, Wisconsin: Incumbent Tom Barrett won re-election.
- Orlando, Florida: Incumbent Buddy Dyer won re-election.
- Portland, Oregon: Incumbent Sam Adams did not seek another term. Charlie Hales was elected as his replacement.
- San Diego, California: Incumbent Jerry Sanders was term-limited out of office. Former congressman Bob Filner was elected to replace him, defeating city councilman Carl DeMaio.

== Election financing ==
The 2012 election cycle was the first to be impacted by the Supreme Court's Citizens United decision, which prohibited the government from restricting independent political expenditures by corporations and unions. The projected cost of the 2012 federal election races is estimated to be over 5.8 billion dollars, with approximately $1 billion of that coming from "outside" groups (groups not directly controlled by the candidate's campaign or officially controlled by the party). During the elections there was much spending by the lobbies, particularly the fossil fuels lobby.

== Table of federal and state results ==
Bold indicates a change in control. Note that not all states held gubernatorial, state legislative, and United States Senate elections in 2012.

State		Before 2012 elections				After 2012 elections				
State	PVI	Governor	State leg.	US Senate	US House	President	Governor	State leg.	US Senate	US House
Alabama	R+13	Rep	Rep	Rep	Rep 6–1	Rep	Rep	Rep	Rep	Rep 6–1
Alaska	R+13	Rep	Split	Split	Rep 1–0	Rep	Rep	**Rep**	Split	Rep 1–0
Arizona	R+6	Rep	Rep	Rep	Rep 5–3	Rep	Rep	Rep	Rep	**Dem** 5–4
Arkansas	R+9	Dem	Dem	Split	Rep 3–1	Rep	Dem	**Rep**	Split	Rep 4–0
California	D+7	Dem	Dem	Dem	Dem 34–19	Dem	Dem	Dem	Dem	Dem 38–15
Colorado	Even	Dem	Split	Dem	Rep 4–3	Dem	Dem	**Dem**	Dem	Rep 4–3
Connecticut	D+7	Dem	Dem	Split D/I (Note: Joe Lieberman was elected as an independent but continued to caucus with Senate Democrats. Connecticut's other Senator was a Democrat.)	Dem 5–0	Dem	Dem	Dem	**Dem**	Dem 5–0
Delaware	D+7	Dem	Dem	Dem	Dem 1–0	Dem	Dem	Dem	Dem	Dem 1–0
Florida	R+2	Rep	Rep	Split	Rep 19–6	Dem	Rep	Rep	Split	Rep 17–10
Georgia	R+7	Rep	Rep	Rep	Rep 8–5	Rep	Rep	Rep	Rep	Rep 9–5
Hawaii	D+12	Dem	Dem	Dem	Dem 2–0	Dem	Dem	Dem	Dem	Dem 2–0
Idaho	R+17	Rep	Rep	Rep	Rep 2–0	Rep	Rep	Rep	Rep	Rep 2–0
Illinois	D+8	Dem	Dem	Split	Rep 11–8	Dem	Dem	Dem	Split	**Dem** 12–6
Indiana	R+6	Rep	Rep	Rep	Rep 6–3	Rep	Rep	Rep	**Split**	Rep 7–2
Iowa	D+1	Rep	Split	Split	Dem 3–2	Dem	Rep	Split	Split	**Split 2–2**
Kansas	R+11	Rep	Rep	Rep	Rep 4–0	Rep	Rep	Rep	Rep	Rep 4–0
Kentucky	R+10	Dem	Split	Rep	Rep 4–2	Rep	Dem	Split	Rep	Rep 5–1
Louisiana	R+10	Rep	Split	Split	Rep 6–1	Rep	Rep	**Rep**	Split	Rep 5–1
Maine	D+5	Rep	Rep	Rep	Dem 2–0	Dem	Rep	**Dem**	**Split R/I** (Note: One of Maine's Senators is a Republican, the other (Angus King) is an independent who has caucused with the Democrats since taking office in 2013.)	Dem 2–0
Maryland	D+9	Dem	Dem	Dem	Dem 6–2	Dem	Dem	Dem	Dem	Dem 7–1
Massachusetts	D+12	Dem	Dem	Split	Dem 10–0	Dem	Dem	Dem	**Dem**	Dem 9–0
Michigan	D+4	Rep	Rep	Dem	Rep 9–6	Dem	Rep	Rep	Dem	Rep 9–5
Minnesota	D+2	Dem	Rep	Dem	Split 4–4	Dem	Dem	**Dem**	Dem	**Dem** 5–3
Mississippi	R+10	Rep	Dem	Rep	Rep 3–1	Rep	Rep	**Rep**	Rep	Rep 3–1
Missouri	R+3	Dem	Rep	Split	Rep 6–3	Rep	Dem	Rep	Split	Rep 6–2
Montana	R+7	Dem	Rep	Dem	Rep 1–0	Rep	Dem	Rep	Dem	Rep 1–0
Nebraska	R+13	Rep	NP	Split	Rep 3–0	Rep	Rep	NP	Rep	Rep 3–0
Nevada	D+1	Rep	Dem	Split	Rep 2–1	Dem	Rep	Dem	Split	**Split 2–2**
New Hampshire	D+2	Dem	Rep	Split	Rep 2–0	Dem	Dem	**Split**	Split	**Dem 2–0**
New Jersey	D+4	Rep	Dem	Dem	Dem 7–6	Dem	Rep	Dem	Dem	**Split 6–6**
New Mexico	D+2	Rep	Dem	Dem	Dem 2–1	Dem	Rep	Dem	Dem	Dem 2–1
New York	D+10	Dem	Split	Dem	Dem 21–8	Dem	Dem	Split	Dem	Dem 21–6
North Carolina	R+4	Dem	Rep	Split	Dem 7–6	Rep	**Rep**	Rep	Split	**Rep 9–4**
North Dakota	R+10	Rep	Rep	Split	Rep 1–0	Rep	Rep	Rep	Split	Rep 1–0
Ohio	R+1	Rep	Rep	Split	Rep 13–5	Dem	Rep	Rep	Split	Rep 12–4
Oklahoma	R+17	Rep	Rep	Rep	Rep 4–1	Rep	Rep	Rep	Rep	Rep 5–0
Oregon	D+4	Dem	Split	Dem	Dem 4–1	Dem	Dem	**Dem**	Dem	Dem 4–1
Pennsylvania	D+2	Rep	Rep	Split	Rep 12–7	Dem	Rep	Rep	Split	Rep 13–5
Rhode Island	D+11	Ind	Dem	Dem	Dem 2–0	Dem	Ind	Dem	Dem	Dem 2–0
South Carolina	R+8	Rep	Rep	Rep	Rep 5–1	Rep	Rep	Rep	Rep	Rep 6–1
South Dakota	R+9	Rep	Rep	Split	Rep 1–0	Rep	Rep	Rep	Split	Rep 1–0
Tennessee	R+9	Rep	Rep	Rep	Rep 7–2	Rep	Rep	Rep	Rep	Rep 7–2
Texas	R+10	Rep	Rep	Rep	Rep 23–9	Rep	Rep	Rep	Rep	Rep 24–12
Utah	R+20	Rep	Rep	Rep	Rep 2–1	Rep	Rep	Rep	Rep	Rep 3–1
Vermont	D+13	Dem	Dem	Split D/I (Note: Bernie Sanders was elected as an independent but caucused with Senate Democrats. Vermont's other Senator was a Democrat.)	Dem 1–0	Dem	Dem	Dem	Split D/I	Dem 1–0
Virginia	R+2	Rep	Split	Dem	Rep 8–3	Dem	Rep	Split	Dem	Rep 8–3
Washington	D+5	Dem	Dem	Dem	Dem 5–4	Dem	Dem	**Split**	Dem	Dem 6–4
West Virginia	R+8	Dem	Dem	Dem	Rep 2–1	Rep	Dem	Dem	Dem	Rep 2–1
Wisconsin	D+2	Rep	Split	Split	Rep 5–3	Dem	Rep	**Rep**	Split	Rep 5–3
Wyoming	R+20	Rep	Rep	Rep	Rep 1–0	Rep	Rep	Rep	Rep	Rep 1–0
United States	Even	Rep 29–20	Rep 25–16	Dem 53–47	Rep 242–193	Dem	Rep 29–21	Rep 27–19	Dem 55–45	Rep 233–199
Washington, D.C.	D+43	Dem (Note: Washington, D.C. does not elect a governor or state legislature, but it does elect a mayor and a city council.)	Dem	—N/a	Dem	Dem	Dem	Dem	—N/a	Dem
American Samoa	—N/a	NP/D (Note: Although elections for governor of American Samoa are non-partisan, Governor Togiola Tulafono affiliates with the Democratic party at the national level.)	NP	—N/a	Dem	—N/a	NP/I (Note: Although elections for governor of American Samoa are non-partisan, Governor Lolo Matalasi Moliga was elected in 2012 as an Independent.)	NP	—N/a	**Rep**
Guam	—N/a	Rep	Dem	—N/a	Dem	Dem (Note: Although Guam does not have a vote in the Electoral College, the territory has held a presidential advisory vote for every presidential election since 1980.)	Rep	Dem	—N/a	Dem
N. Mariana Islands	—N/a	CP	Rep	—N/a	Dem	—N/a	CP	**Split**	—N/a	Dem
Puerto Rico	—N/a	PNP/R (Note: Puerto Rican Governor Luis Fortuño is a member of the New Progressive Party but affiliates with the Republican Party at the national level.)	PNP	—N/a	PNP/D (Note: Puerto Rico's Resident Commissioner, Pedro Pierluisi, was elected as a member of the New Progressive Party and has caucused with the Democrats since taking office in 2009.)	—N/a	**PDP/D** (Note: Puerto Rican Governor Alejandro García Padilla is a member of the Popular Democratic Party but affiliates with the Democratic Party at the national level.)	**PDP**	—N/a	PNP/D
U.S. Virgin Islands	—N/a	Dem	Dem	—N/a	Dem	—N/a	Dem	Dem	—N/a	Dem
Subdivision	PVI	Governor	State leg.	U.S. Senate	U.S. House	President	Governor	State leg.	U.S. Senate	U.S. House
Subdivision and PVI		Before 2012 elections				After 2012 elections				
