= 2023 Orlando mayoral election =

- November 7, 2023
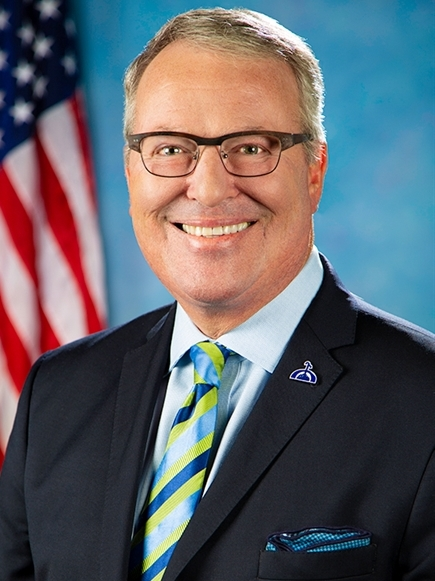

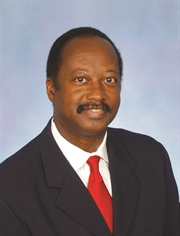
| Candidate | Buddy Dyer | Steve Dixon | Sam Ings |
| Party | Nonpartisan | Nonpartisan | Nonpartisan |
| Popular vote | 18,670 | 3,812 | 2,193 |
| Percentage | 72.79% | 14.86% | 8.55% |
Mayor before election
Buddy Dyer
Nonpartisan
Elected mayor
Buddy Dyer
Nonpartisan

The 2023 Orlando mayoral election took place on November 7, 2023. Incumbent Mayor Buddy Dyer, the longest-serving mayor in city history, ran for re-election to his sixth full term. He faced three challengers: former City Councilman Sam Ings, former Republican State Senate candidate Steve Dixon, and businessman Tony Vargas.

Dyer entered the campaign as the frontrunner, significantly outraising and outspending his opponents, and earning the endorsement of the Orlando Sentinel. Dyer won re-election in a landslide, winning 73 percent of the vote, and avoiding the need for a runoff election.

== General election ==
=== Candidates ===
- Buddy Dyer, incumbent Mayor
- Steve Dixon, 2022 Republican nominee for the State Senate
- Sam Ings, former City Councilman, 2019 and 2004 candidate for Mayor
- Tony Vargas, businessman

=== Results ===
2023 Orlando mayoral election
| Party | Candidate | Votes | % |
|---|---|---|---|
| Nonpartisan | Buddy Dyer (inc.) | 18,670 | 72.79% |
| Nonpartisan | Steve Dixon | 3,812 | 14.86% |
| Nonpartisan | Sam Ings | 2,193 | 8.55% |
| Nonpartisan | Tony Vargas | 974 | 3.80% |
| Total votes | | 25,649 | 100.00% |
