= Foster Samuel Chipman =

American politician

10th Mayor of Orlando
- In office 1887–1888
- Preceded by: Ephraim J. Reel
- Succeeded by: Matthew Robinson Marks

Personal details
- Born: c. 1829
- Died: unknown
- Party: Democratic

Foster Samuel Chipman was an American politician who served as the 10th mayor of Orlando, Florida, from 1887 to 1888.
