= Ernest Page =

American politician

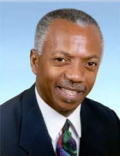

Interim Mayor of Orlando, Florida
- In office March 2005 – April 2005
- Preceded by: Buddy Dyer
- Succeeded by: Buddy Dyer

Personal details
- Born: 1942 (age 83–84) Orlando, Florida

Ernest Page (born circa 1942) is a former member of the Orlando, Florida, City Council who served as Orlando's interim mayor in March and April 2005 while the elected mayor, Buddy Dyer, was facing charges of electoral fraud. After the charges against Dyer were dismissed in April 2005, Page returned to his City Council position. He was the first African-American to serve as mayor of Orlando. He was imprisoned for political corruption.

== Biography ==
Page was born in Orlando, the son of Arizona and Edoras Page, an African Methodist Episcopal minister. He graduated from Jones High School in 1960, earned a B.A. from Morehouse College in 1964 and received a M.S. in mathematics from Atlanta University and an M.B.A. from Nova University.

Page, an African-American, was first elected to the Orlando City Council in the early 1980s, but left office during his first term after a conviction for dealing in stolen property.

He was elected to City Council again in 1996, and won re-election in 2000 and 2004. In March 2005, he was serving as mayor pro tem under Mayor Buddy Dyer when Dyer was indicted and jailed for electoral fraud. Following Dyer's removal, Page took office as interim mayor. He was interim mayor for about six weeks, until April 19, when the charges against Dyer were dropped and he was restored to office.

On March 1, 2006, Councilman Page was arrested on charges of political corruption while in the mayor's office. In September 2006 he was convicted of bribery and official misconduct for threatening to stop a redevelopment proposal unless the prospective developer gave a piece of the project to a nonprofit group with which Page was affiliated. He was subsequently sentenced to 42 months in prison.

Following his sentencing in December 2006, Page was removed from city office by an executive order from Governor Jeb Bush.

Page appealed his conviction in federal circuit court, but lost the appeal in March 2008. He entered prison in June 2008. He was released from prison in 2011 after serving about 3 years of his 3 1/2-year sentence. Most of his prison time was spent at Marion Correctional Institution in Marion County, Florida.

Preceded by Buddy Dyer	Interim Mayor of Orlando; 2005	Succeeded by Buddy Dyer
