= 2000 Orlando mayoral election =

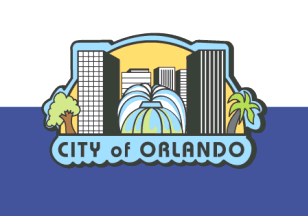
- March 14, 2000
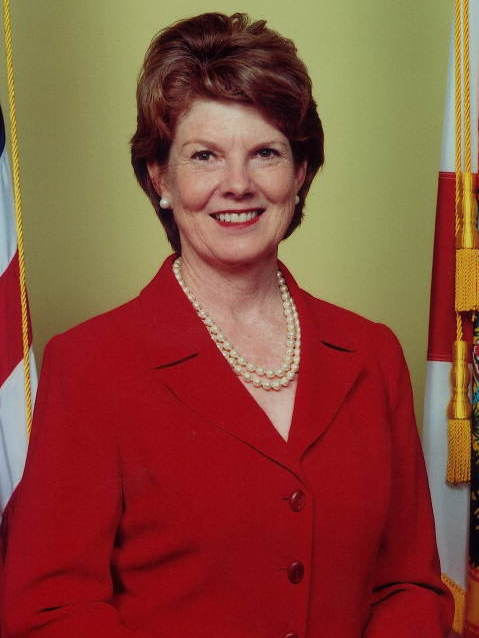

Candidate	Glenda Hood	Bruce Gordy	Tom Levine
Party	Nonpartisan	Nonpartisan	Nonpartisan
Popular vote	16,027	9,708	3,060
Percentage	55.46%	33.59%	10.59%
Mayor before election
Glenda Hood
Nonpartisan
Elected mayor
Glenda Hood
Nonpartisan

The 2000 Orlando mayoral election took place on March 14, 2000. Incumbent Mayor Glenda Hood ran for re-election to a third term. She was challenged by three candidates, with City Councilmember Bruce Gordy emerging as her main competitor. The campaign was the most expensive in city history, though Hood was viewed as the likely victor. Hood ultimately won re-election by a wide margin, winning 55 percent of the vote to Gordy's 34 percent, and avoiding the need for a runoff election.

Hood would not serve out her full term as Mayor, however. Following Governor Jeb Bush's re-election in 2002, he announced that he would nominate Hood to serve as Secretary of State. Hood's resignation as Mayor triggered a 2003 special election.

To date, this is the last time a Republican was elected mayor of Orlando.

== General election ==
=== Candidates ===
- Glenda Hood, incumbent Mayor
- Bruce Gordy, City Councilmember
- Tom Levine, traveling salesman, 1992 candidate for City Council
- Steve Villard, auto repairman, 1996 candidate for Mayor

=== Polling ===
Poll source	Date(s) administered	Sample size (Note: Key: A – all adults RV – registered voters LV – likely voters V – unclear)	Margin of error	Glenda Hood	Bruce Gordy	Tom Levine	Undecided
Mason-Dixon Polling & Strategy	February 24–25, 2000	406 (LV)	± 5.0%	48%	28%	3%	21%

=== Results ===
2000 Orlando mayoral election results
Party	Candidate	Votes	%
Nonpartisan	Glenda Hood (inc.)	16,027	55.46%
Nonpartisan	Bruce Gordy	9,708	33.59%
Nonpartisan	Tom Levine	3,060	10.59%
Nonpartisan	Steve Villard	104	15.96%
Total votes		28,899	100.00%
