= James LeRoy Giles =

American politician

22nd Mayor of Orlando
- In office August 13, 1916 – January 1, 1920
- Preceded by: E. Frank Sperry
- Succeeded by: Eugene Duckworth

24th Mayor of Orlando
- In office April 2, 1924 – January 1, 1926
- Preceded by: Eugene Duckworth
- Succeeded by: Latta Malette Autrey

26th Mayor of Orlando
- In office January 1, 1929 – January 1, 1932
- Preceded by: Latta Malette Autrey
- Succeeded by: Samuel Yulee Way

Personal details
- Born: June 16, 1863 Zellwood, Orange County, Florida, U.S.
- Died: May 3, 1946 (aged 82) Orlando, Florida, U.S.
- Political party: Democrat
- Spouse: Nannie C. (Bartlett) Giles
- Children: Leroy Bartlett, Edna Adelma (Radebaugh), and Estelle (Weathersbee)
- Parent(s): Enoch H. Giles and Nellie B. Giles
- Occupation: Real estate dealer

James LeRoy Giles (June 16, 1863 – May 3, 1946) was the twenty-second, twenty-fourth, and twenty-sixth Mayor of Orlando, serving non-consecutively from 1916 to 1920, 1924 to 1926, and 1929 to 1932. He also served as an alternate delegate to the Democratic National Convention from Florida in the 1912 United States Presidential Election.

== Biography ==
James Giles was born in Zellwood in Orange County, Florida, on June 16, 1863. His father was the Reverend Enoch H. Giles (1836–1908) and his mother was Nellie B. Giles (1847–1917).

He first became Mayor of Orlando when he succeeded incumbent E. Frank Sperry upon his death on August 13, 1916.

In his 1919 bid for reelection, he was defeated by Eugene Duckworth. Later, in 1924, he became mayor again upon Duckworth's resignation from office due to a failed city commissioners recall election.

He was defeated in his bid for reelection again in 1925 by Latta Malette Autrey, but subsequently defeated Autrey in the next election in 1929. He did not run for another term in 1931, and was succeeded by Samuel Yulee Way.

== Death ==
Giles died on May 3, 1946, in Orlando, Florida. He was 82 years old. He was interred at Greenwood Cemetery.

== Legacy ==
His niece Edna Giles Fuller would eventually become the first woman elected to the Florida House of Representatives.

Political offices
Preceded by E. Frank Sperry	Mayor of Orlando, Florida; 1916-1920	Succeeded by Eugene Goodman Duckworth
Preceded by Eugene Goodman Duckworth	Mayor of Orlando, Florida; 1924-1926	Succeeded by Latta Malette Autrey
Preceded by Latta Malette Autrey	Mayor of Orlando, Florida; 1929-1932	Succeeded by Samuel Yulee Way
