= Greenwood Cemetery (Orlando, Florida) =

Cemetery in Orlando, Florida, United States

- Interactive map of Greenwood Cemetery

Details
- Established: 1880
- Location: Orlando, Florida
- Country: United States
- Coordinates: 28°32′05″N 81°21′26″W
- Owned by: City of Orlando
- Find a Grave: Greenwood Cemetery

Greenwood Cemetery is a historic cemetery located in Orlando, Florida.

== History ==
In 1880, eight Orlando residents pooled resources to buy 26 acres of land and form Orlando Cemetery. The name was changed to Greenwood Cemetery in 1915 at the request of two of its founders. The cemetery has expanded with land purchases over time and now has 86 acres. Sections of the cemetery are dedicated to Confederate veterans, Union veterans, Spanish–American War veterans, World War I veterans, and World War II veterans.

Moonlight walking tours of the cemetery are popular in Orlando. These tours are led by a sexton and offer a window into Orlando's history. The west side of the cemetery contains the 19-acre park, Greenwood Urban Wetlands, which was established in 1991.

A section of the cemetery contains unmarked plots for victims of lynchings by white people, according to history professor Vibert White. One such victim, July Perry, who was hanged in 1920 after trying to vote in Ocoee, received a headstone in 2002.

In the wake of the Pulse nightclub shooting of June 12, 2016, the City of Orlando offered plots for those killed.

== Notable burials ==
- U.S. Senator Charles O. Andrews
- U.S. Rep. William Thomas Bland
- FL Rep. Edna Giles Fuller, first woman to serve in the Florida State Legislature.
- Francis W. Eppes, grandson of President Thomas Jefferson, intendant (mayor) of Tallahassee from 1841–44 & 1856–57. He was also instrumental in founding Florida State University.
- Mayor Cassius Aurelius Boone
- Mayor Willis Lucullus Palmer
- Mayor John Letcher Bryan
- Mayor James B. Parramore
- Mayor Mahlon Gore
- Mayor James Horace Smith
- Mayor Braxton Beacham
- Mayor Carl Langford
- William R. O'Neal, president of the Orlando City Council
- National Baseball Hall of Famer Joe Tinker
- Journalist and discredited NY Times Pulitzer prize winner Walter Duranty
- Former ShopHQ host, singer and television personality Connie Kunkle

== See also ==
- List of cemeteries in the United States
- List of cemeteries in Florida
