= 2012 Orlando mayoral election =

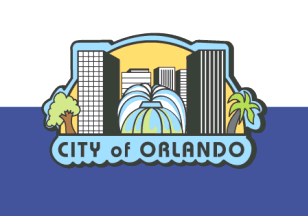
- April 3, 2012
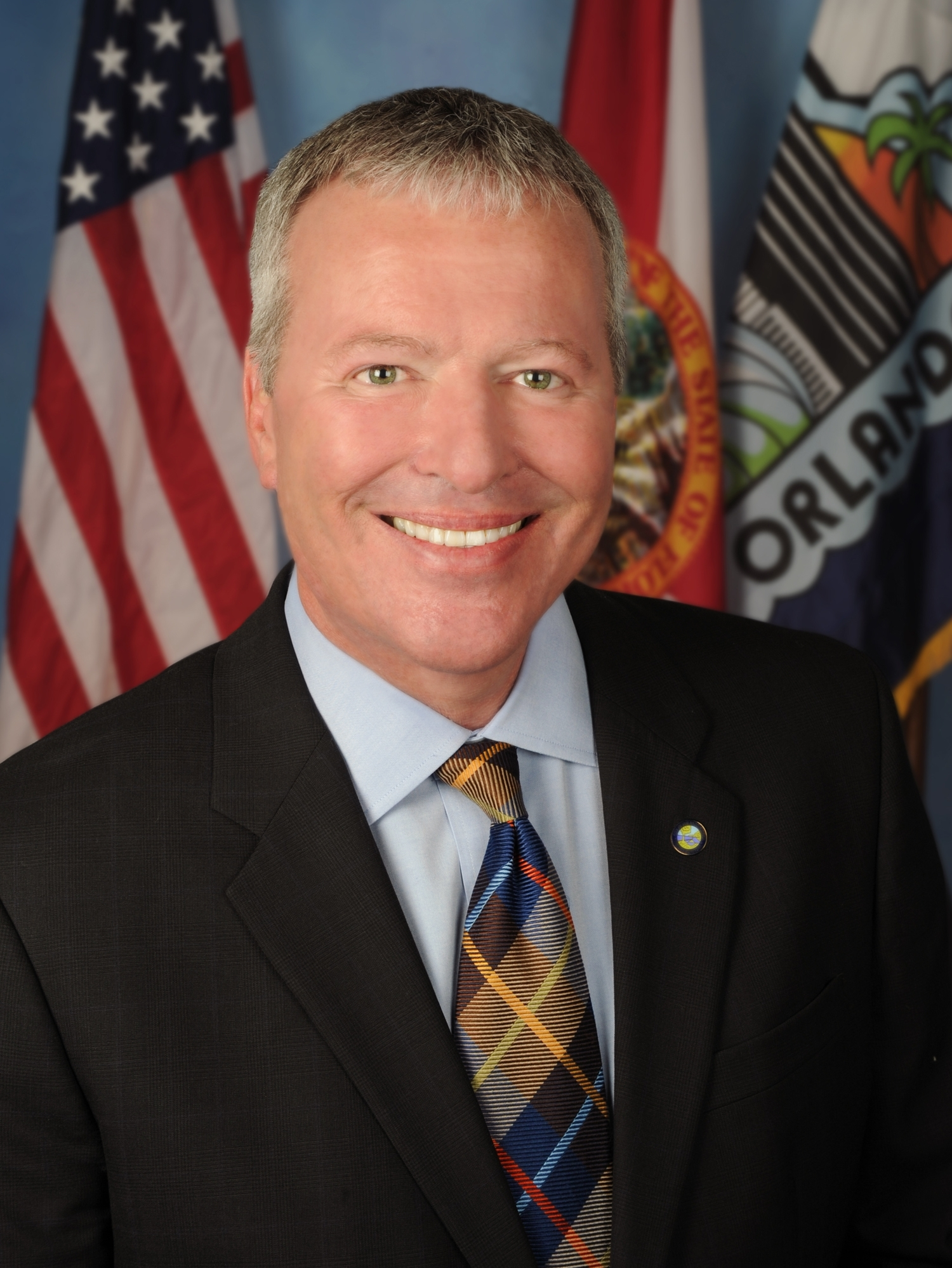

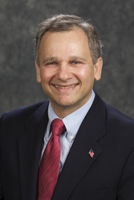

Candidate	Buddy Dyer	Phil Diamond	Ken Mulvaney
Party	Nonpartisan	Nonpartisan	Nonpartisan
Popular vote	12,121	5,707	2,316
Percentage	58.27%	27.43%	11.13%
Mayor before election
Buddy Dyer
Nonpartisan
Elected mayor
Buddy Dyer
Nonpartisan

The 2012 Orlando mayoral election took place on April 3, 2012. Incumbent Mayor Buddy Dyer ran for re-election to a third full term. Dyer faced three challengers: City Councilman Phil Diamond, businessman Ken Mulvaney, and political organizer Mike Cantone.

Mulvaney, who ran against Dyer in 2004 and 2008, ran against Dyer again because of rumors that he would run for Governor in 2014, and attacked him as a "career politician." Diamond, a consistent opponent of Dyer's initiatives, argued that Dyer "has neglected our neighborhoods, favored his connected friends and poured too many of our resources into special-interest downtown projects." The Orlando Sentinel endorsed Dyer for re-election, praising him for "ha[ving] the best mix of experience and vision to lead the city.

Dyer ultimately won re-election by a wide margin and avoided a runoff election, winning 58 percent of the vote to Diamond's 27 percent.

== General election ==
=== Candidates ===
- Buddy Dyer, incumbent Mayor
- Phil Diamond, City Councilman
- Ken Mulvaney, businessman, 2004 and 2008 candidate for Mayor
- Mike Cantone, political organizer

==== Dropped out ====
- Linda Grund, foster-care advocate

=== Results ===
2012 Orlando mayoral election results
Party	Candidate	Votes	%
Nonpartisan	Buddy Dyer (inc.)	12,121	58.27%
Nonpartisan	Phil Diamond	5,707	27.43%
Nonpartisan	Ken Mulvaney	2,316	11.13%
Nonpartisan	Mike Cantone	659	3.17%
Total votes		20,803	100.00%
