= John Letcher Bryan =

American politician (1848–1898)

8th Mayor of Orlando
- In office 1883–1885
- Preceded by: Cassius Aurelius Boone
- Succeeded by: Ephraim J. Reel

Personal details
- Born: December 27, 1848
- Died: December 23, 1898 (aged 49)
- Party: Democratic

John Letcher Bryan (December 27, 1848 – December 23, 1898) was an American politician who served as the eighth mayor of Orlando, Florida, from 1883 until his resignation in 1885. He also served in the Confederate Army during the American Civil War. He is buried in Greenwood Cemetery in Orlando.
