= George H. Combs Jr. =

American politician (1899–1977)

George Hamilton Combs Jr.
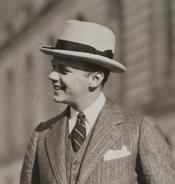

Member of the U.S. House of Representatives from Missouri's 5th district
- In office March 4, 1927 – March 3, 1929
- Preceded by: Edgar C. Ellis
- Succeeded by: Edgar C. Ellis

Personal details
- Born: May 2, 1899 Kansas City, Missouri, U.S.
- Died: November 29, 1977 (aged 78) West Palm Beach, Florida, U.S.
- Party: Democratic
- Education: University of Missouri; University of Michigan at Ann Arbor; Kansas City School of Law

George Hamilton Combs Jr. (May 2, 1899 – November 29, 1977) was an American lawyer and politician who served as a member of the U.S. House of Representatives from Missouri's 5th congressional district from 1927 to 1929.

Born in Kansas City, Missouri, Combs attended the Kansas City public schools, the University of Missouri, and the University of Michigan at Ann Arbor. He served in the United States Navy in 1918, and graduated from the Kansas City School of Law in 1921. He was admitted to the bar the same year and commenced practice in Kansas City, Missouri. He served as assistant prosecuting attorney of Jackson County, Missouri from 1922 to 1924. Combs was an unsuccessful candidate for election in 1924 to the 69th United States Congress. He was elected as a Democrat to the 70th Congress (March 4, 1927 – March 3, 1929). He was not a candidate for renomination in 1928. He served as delegate to the 1928 Democratic National Convention.

He moved to New York City in 1929 and continued to practice law. He served as special assistant to the attorney general of New York in 1931, and was attorney for the Triborough Bridge Authority in 1933 and 1934. He served as associate counsel to the New York State Joint Legislative Committee to Investigate Public Utilities from 1934 to 1936. In 1936, President Franklin D. Roosevelt appointed him as New York State director of the National Emergency Council. He served as special U.S. attorney at the Office of Price Stabilization for the southern district of New York in 1951 and 1952. Combs worked as a radio news analyst, war correspondent, and writer from 1937 to 1951, and as a television and news commentator from 1952 to 1961. He was chief United Nations correspondent and news commentator for Mutual Broadcasting System from 1961 to 1971. He died in West Palm Beach, Florida, on November 29, 1977.

== Electoral history ==
Electoral history of George H. Combs Jr.
Year	Office		Party	Votes			Result	Swing	Ref.
Year	Office		Party	Total	%	P.	Result	Swing	Ref.
1924	U.S. House	5th	Democratic	85,581	48.92	2nd	Lost	Gain	
1926	U.S. House	5th	Democratic	78,700	56.20	1st	Won	Gain	
Source: Clerk of the U.S. House | Election Statistics

U.S. House of Representatives
Preceded by Edgar C. Ellis	Member of the U.S. House of Representatives from Missouri's 5th congressional district 1927-1929	Succeeded by Edgar C. Ellis
