= B. M. Robinson =

American politician

County Clerk of Courts for Orange County, Florida
- In office 1905–1932
- Succeeded by: Clarence Gay

16th Mayor of Orlando
- In office 1902–1904
- Preceded by: Clarence Everett Howard
- Succeeded by: James Horace Smith

Member of the Florida House of Representatives from the Orange County district
- In office 1884–1886

Personal details
- Born: November 16, 1845 Russell County, Alabama
- Died: October 4, 1938 (aged 92) Orlando, Florida
- Party: Democratic Party

Benjamin M'Lain Robinson (November 16, 1845 – October 4, 1938) was an American politician and Confederate veteran who served in the Florida House of Representatives, as the 16th mayor of Orlando, Florida, from 1902 to 1904, and as a longtime county clerk for Orange County, Florida.

== Biography ==
Benjamin M'Lain Robinson was born on November 16, 1845, in Russell County, Alabama. During the American Civil War, he joined the Confederate States Army and served in the 63rd Alabama Regiment. After the war, he moved to Orange County, Florida.

Robinson campaigned for the Florida House of Representatives in 1884 as a member of the Democratic Party. He was elected and represented Orange County in the state house in 1885. He served as the 16th mayor of Orlando, Florida, from 1902 to 1904. In 1905, he was elected as the county clerk for Orange County.

In 1932, he was acquitted after being charged with embezzlement. He lost his reelection campaign later that year.

Robinson died on October 4, 1938, in Orlando, Florida.
