= 2008 Orlando mayoral election =

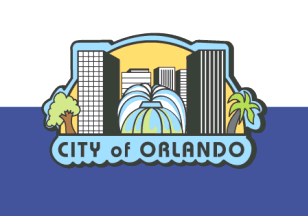
- January 29, 2008
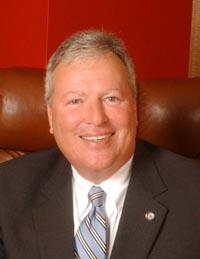

| Candidate | Buddy Dyer | Ken Mulvaney |
| Party | Nonpartisan | Nonpartisan |
| Popular vote | 24,181 | 15,863 |
| Percentage | 60.39% | 39.61% |
Mayor before election
Buddy Dyer
Nonpartisan
Elected mayor
Buddy Dyer
Nonpartisan

The 2008 Orlando mayoral election took place on January 29, 2008. Incumbent Mayor Buddy Dyer ran for re-election to a second full term. Dyer was challenged by businessman Ken Mulvaney, his main opponent in the 2004 election. Mulvaney challenged his loss in the election, alleging that Dyer illegally paid a consultant to collect absentee ballots, which culminated in Dyer's indictment and suspension from office, and a special election. However, the charges were ultimately dropped against Dyer, he was restored to office, and the special election was cancelled.

The race between Dyer and Mulvaney attracted less attention than their 2004 campaign, and ultimately saw Dyer win re-election in a landslide, receiving 60 percent of the vote to Mulvaney's 40 percent.

== General election ==
=== Candidates ===
- Buddy Dyer, incumbent Mayor
- Ken Mulvaney, businessman, 2004 candidate for Mayor

==== Disqualified ====
- Tim Adams, former board member of the Orange County Soil and Water Conservation District

=== Results ===
2008 Orlando mayoral election results
| Party | Candidate | Votes | % |
|---|---|---|---|
| Nonpartisan | Buddy Dyer (inc.) | 24,181 | 60.39% |
| Nonpartisan | Ken Mulvaney | 15,863 | 39.61% |
| Total votes | | 40,044 | 100.00% |
