= William Hayden Reynolds =

American politician

20th Mayor of Orlando
- In office 1910–1913
- Preceded by: William Henry Jewell
- Succeeded by: E. Frank Sperry

Personal details
- Born: June 29, 1847
- Died: February 1, 1935 (aged 87)
- Occupation: Sawmill owner; banker

William Hayden Reynolds (June 29, 1847 – February 1, 1935) was the twentieth Mayor of Orlando from 1910 to 1913. He was also the owner of Orlando Telephone Company from 1908 to 1914. He died at the age of 87 in 1935.
