= William P. Borland =

American politician and lawyer (1867–1919)

William Patterson Borland
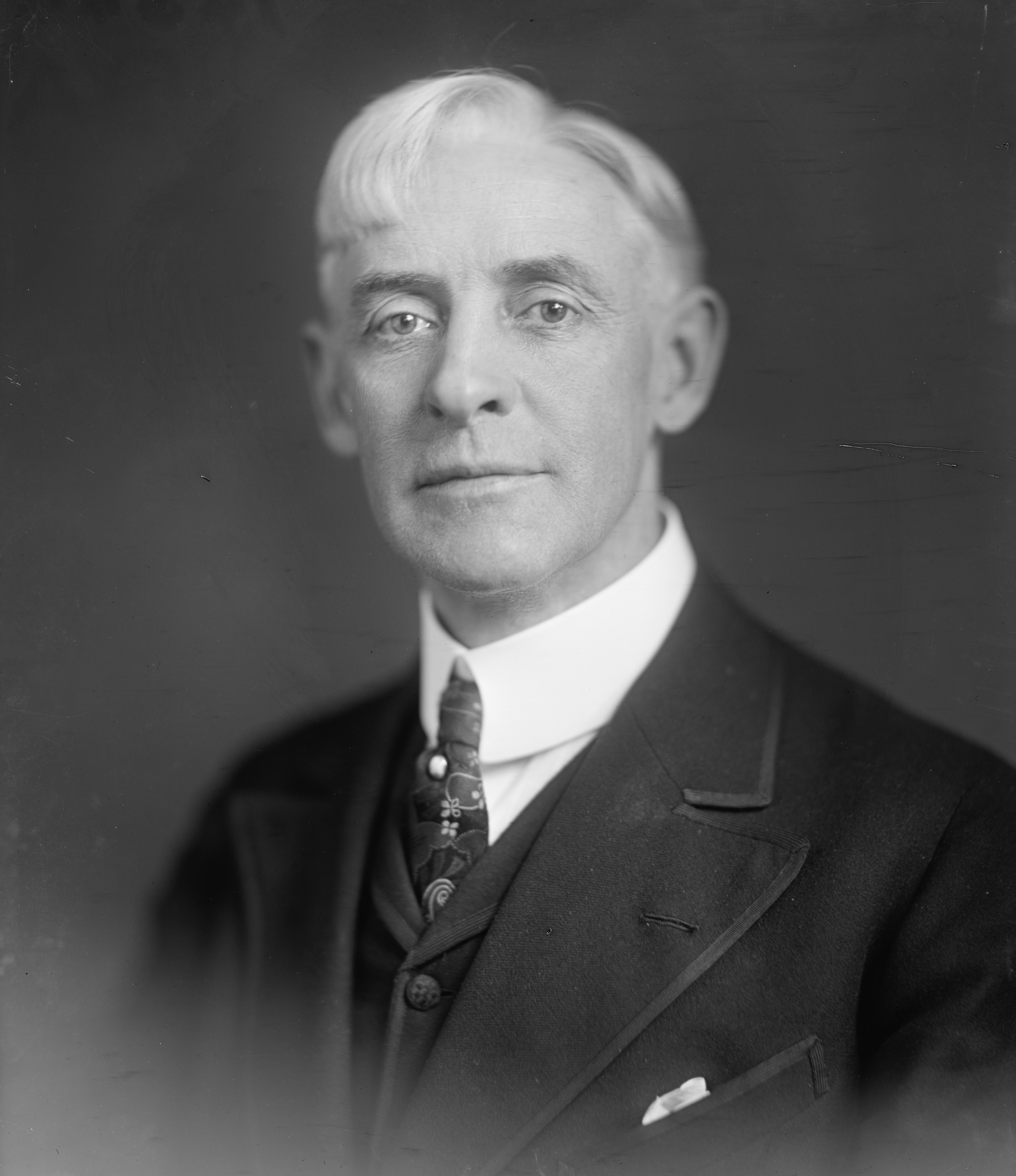

Member of the U.S. House of Representatives
- In office March 4, 1909 – February 20, 1919

Personal details
- Born: October 14, 1867 Leavenworth, Kansas, U.S.
- Died: February 20, 1919 (aged 51) Koblenz, Germany
- Resting place: Elmwood Cemetery; Kansas City, Missouri, U.S.
- Party: Democratic
- Spouse: Ona Winants (m. 1904)
- Education: University of Michigan
- Occupation: Politician; lawyer

William Patterson Borland (October 14, 1867 – February 20, 1919) was a U.S. representative from Missouri.

== Early life ==
William Patterson Borland was born on October 14, 1867, in Leavenworth, Kansas. Borland attended public school. He graduated from the law department of the University of Michigan in 1892. He was admitted to the bar.

== Career ==
After graduating, Borland commenced the practice of law in Kansas City, Missouri. He assisted in the organization of the Kansas City School of Law and served as dean from 1895 through 1909. Borland served as member of the board of freeholders directed to draft a charter for Kansas City in 1898. He also engaged as an author on law subjects.

Borland was elected as a Democrat to the sixty-first and four succeeding Congresses, and served from March 4, 1909 until his death. In 1914, he sponsored the District of Columbia Improvements Legislation, informally known as the Borland Amendment. Borland also introduced the Calder–Borland Bill (later called the Standard Time Act) with William M. Calder. The bill proposed daylight saving time for workers in the country. Borland was an advocate for prohibition and supported the Kahn amendment, a bill supporting military preparedness prior to the involvement of the United States in World War I. He later supported the Selective Service Act of 1917. He was an unsuccessful candidate for renomination in 1918 to the Sixty-sixth Congress, losing the Democratic primary to William T. Bland.

== Personal life ==
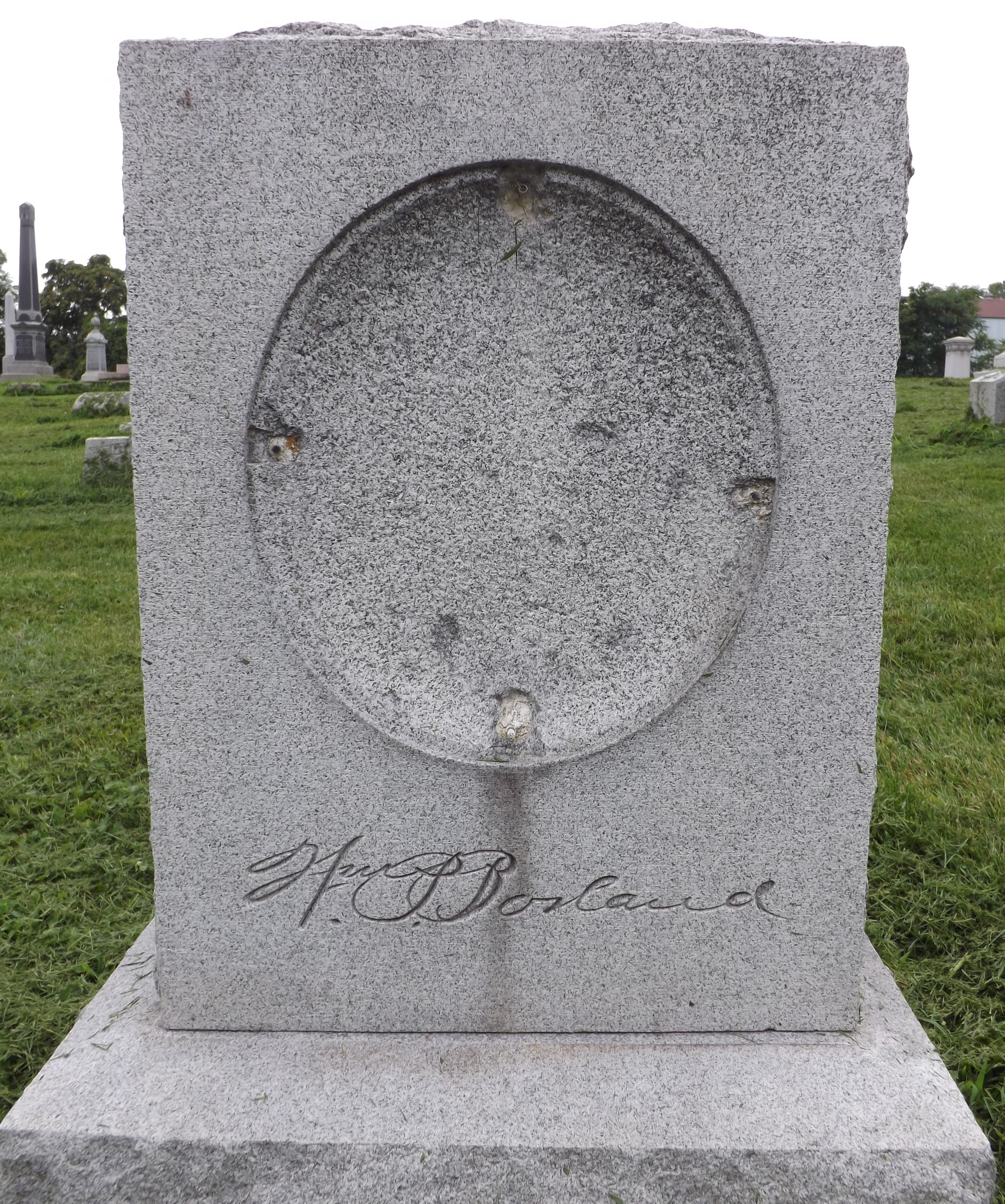
Grave of Borland in Elmwood Cemetery

Borland married Ona Winants in 1904.

In October 1918, Borland was stricken with the Spanish flu. Borland died of pneumonia near Koblenz, Germany, while on a Masonic mission abroad, on February 20, 1919. He was interred in Elmwood Cemetery in Kansas City, Missouri.

== See also ==
- List of members of the United States Congress who died in office (1900–1949)

U.S. House of Representatives
Preceded by Edgar C. Ellis	Member of the U.S. House of Representatives from Missouri's 5th congressional district March 4, 1909 - February 20, 1919	Succeeded by William T. Bland
