= Edgar C. Ellis =

American politician (1854–1947)

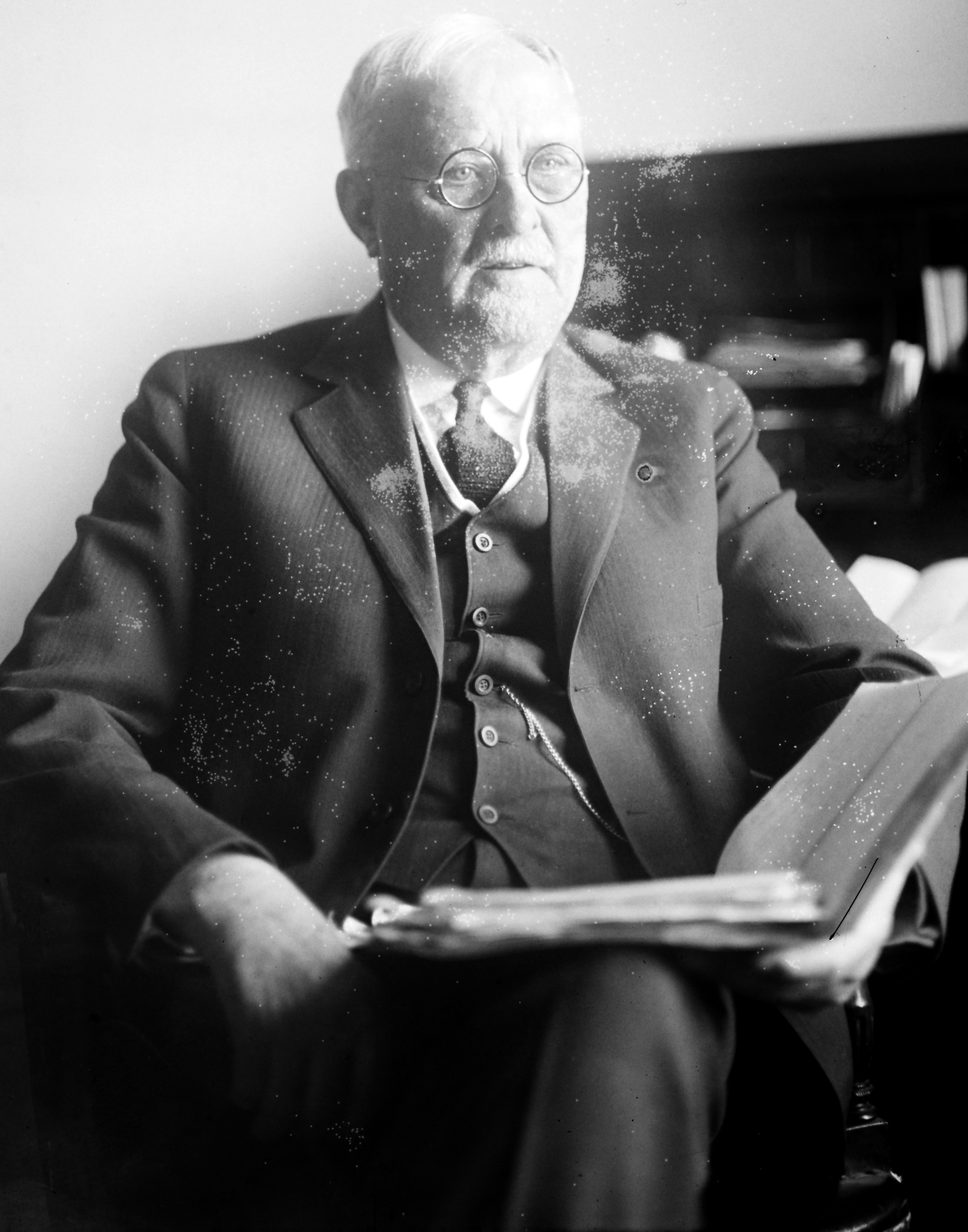
- Ellis (c. 1921)

Member of the U.S. House of Representatives from Missouri's 5th district
- In office March 4, 1905 – March 3, 1909
- Preceded by: William S. Cowherd
- Succeeded by: William P. Borland
- In office March 4, 1921 – March 3, 1923
- Preceded by: William T. Bland
- Succeeded by: Henry L. Jost
- In office March 4, 1925 – March 3, 1927
- Preceded by: Henry L. Jost
- Succeeded by: George H. Combs, Jr.
- In office March 4, 1929 – March 3, 1931
- Preceded by: George H. Combs, Jr.
- Succeeded by: Joe Shannon

Personal details
- Born: October 2, 1854 Vermontville, Michigan, U.S.
- Died: March 15, 1947 (aged 92) St. Petersburg, Florida, U.S.
- Party: Republican
- Spouses: Emily Hatch Roy (m. 1882; died 1931) Katherine Morgan (m. 1936)
- Children: 3
- Education: Olivet College (BA); Carleton College
- Occupation: Educator; lawyer; politician

Edgar Clarence Ellis (October 2, 1854 – March 15, 1947) was a U.S. Representative from Missouri.

== Early life ==
Edgar Clarence Ellis was born on October 2, 1854, in Vermontville, Michigan. Ellis attended country schools. He graduated from Olivet College in Michigan in 1880 with a Bachelor of Arts, and graduated from Carleton College, Northfield, Minnesota, in 1881.

Ellis worked as an instructor in Latin at Carleton College in 1881 and 1882. He worked as superintendent of public schools at Fergus Falls, Minnesota from 1882 to 1885. He studied law. He was admitted to the bar and commenced practice in Beloit, Kansas, in 1885.

== Career ==
Ellis moved to Kansas City, Missouri, in 1888 and continued the practice of his profession. In 1893, Ellis joined up with Hale C. Cook under the law firm Ellis & Cook. James A. Reed and Ernest Ellis would later join, and the firm became Ellis, Cook & Ellis.

Ellis was elected as a Republican to the Fifty-ninth and Sixtieth Congresses (March 4, 1905 – March 3, 1909). He was an unsuccessful candidate for reelection in 1908 to the Sixty-first Congress. He resumed the practice of law in Kansas City, Missouri. He was appointed a member of the Missouri Waterway Commission and served in 1911 and 1912.

Ellis was elected to the Sixty-seventh Congress (March 4, 1921 – March 3, 1923). He was an unsuccessful candidate for reelection in 1922 to the Sixty-eighth Congress. Ellis was elected to the Sixty-ninth Congress (March 4, 1925 – March 3, 1927). He was an unsuccessful candidate for reelection in 1926 to the Seventieth Congress. Ellis was elected to the Seventy-first Congress (March 4, 1929 – March 3, 1931). He was an unsuccessful candidate for reelection in 1930 to the Seventy-second Congress. He then retired from law practice and political life.

== Personal life ==
While a school principal at Fergus Falls, he married Emily Hatch Roy, daughter of abolitionists Rev. Joseph Edwin Roy and Emily Stearns Hatch Roy, on July 20, 1882, in Atlanta, Georgia. They had three sons. His wife died in 1931. He married Mrs. Katherine Morgan of Cincinnati in 1936.

Ellis died in St. Petersburg, Florida, on March 15, 1947. His remains were cremated and the ashes interred in Kansas City, Missouri.

U.S. House of Representatives
Preceded by William S. Cowherd	Member of the U.S. House of Representatives from Missouri's 5th congressional district 1905-1909	Succeeded by William P. Borland
Preceded by William T. Bland	Member of the U.S. House of Representatives from Missouri's 5th congressional district 1921-1923	Succeeded by Henry L. Jost
Preceded by Henry L. Jost	Member of the U.S. House of Representatives from Missouri's 5th congressional district 1925-1927	Succeeded by George H. Combs, Jr.
Preceded by George H. Combs, Jr.	Member of the U.S. House of Representatives from Missouri's 5th congressional district 1929-1931	Succeeded by Joe Shannon
