= Greenwood Urban Wetlands =

Protected area in Orlando, Florida

Coordinates: 28.536°N 81.361°W

Greenwood Urban Wetlands is a park in downtown Orlando, Florida which was created in 1991. The park is adjacent to Greenwood Cemetery. The park is the home of many animal species.
