= James B. Parramore =

American politician

14th Mayor of Orlando
- In office 1896 – February 6, 1902
- Preceded by: Mahlon Gore
- Succeeded by: Clarence Everett Howard

Personal details
- Born: January 20, 1840 Thomasville, Georgia
- Died: February 6, 1902 (aged 62) Orlando, Florida
- Resting place: Greenwood Cemetery, Orlando, Florida
- Party: Democratic
- Spouse: Leila Long Parramore

Military service
- Allegiance: Confederate States of America
- Branch/service: Confederate States Army
- Years of service: 1861-1865
- Rank: Captain
- Unit: 4th Florida Infantry
- Battles/wars: American Civil War

James B. Parramore (January 20, 1840 – February 6, 1902) was an American politician, who was the fourteenth Mayor of Orlando from 1897 to 1902.

== Biography ==
James "Buck" was born in Thomasville, Georgia on January 20, 1840, to Redden and Mary Ann (Tooke) Parramore. He moved to Madison County, Florida by 1845 and then with his family to Orlando in 1881.

Parramore also served as a captain in the Fourth Florida Infantry of the Confederate States Army during the American Civil War. He died while in office in 1902 at the age of 62, where he was interred at Greenwood Cemetery.

Parramore, a neighborhood in west-central Orlando, Florida was built in the 1880s by James Parramore.
