= Mahlon Gore =

American politician (1837–1916)

13th Mayor of Orlando
- In office 1893–1896
- Preceded by: Willis Lucullus Palmer
- Succeeded by: James B. Parramore

Personal details
- Born: February 4, 1837 Climax, Michigan
- Died: June 27, 1916 (aged 79) Orlando, Florida
- Spouse(s): Josephine Lucinda Dawley Gore; Caroline Gore
- Children: Eva Gore Gore Robinson
- Occupation: Newspaper editor

Mahlon Gore (February 4, 1837 – June 27, 1916) was an American politician who served as the 13th mayor of Orlando, Florida, from 1893 to 1896. Gore was born in Michigan and left home at the age of 15 to start work as a printer. He enlisted in the Second Michigan infantry in 1861, and after completing his three months of service decided not to re-enlist and moved to Iowa with his first wife, Josephine. They later homesteaded in the Dakota Territory, where Gore is believed to have made the first filing in Dakota Territory under the new Homestead Act on January 1, 1863. By 1880, his health was failing and so he moved to Orlando, Florida. After Gore moved to Orlando he purchased the Orange County Reporter and entered the newspaper business. He was later elected to the Orlando City Council, and served as Mayor of Orlando from 1894 to 1896. In 1912, he helped to found the First Unitarian Church of Orlando along with his second wife, Caroline. Gore died on June 27, 1916, aged 79. He was interred at Greenwood Cemetery.
