= Ephraim J. Reel =

American politician

9th Mayor of Orlando
- In office 1885–1887
- Preceded by: John Letcher Bryan
- Succeeded by: Foster Samuel Chipman

Personal details
- Party: Democratic

Ephraim J. Reel was an American politician who served as the ninth mayor of Orlando, Florida, from 1885 to 1887.
