= Missouri's 5th congressional district =

U.S. House district for Missouri

Coordinates: 39°08′29″N 93°47′02″W

- Interactive map of district boundaries since January 3, 2023
- Representative: Emanuel Cleaver; D–Kansas City
- Population (2025): 786,007
- Median household income: $75,379
- Ethnicity: 57.9% White; 21.7% Black; 11.2% Hispanic; 5.7% Two or more races; 2.4% Asian; 1.1% other
- Cook PVI: D+12

Missouri's 5th congressional district has been represented in the United States House of Representatives by Democrat Emanuel Cleaver, the former Mayor of Kansas City, since 2005.

The district primarily consists of the inner ring of the Kansas City metropolitan area, including nearly all of Kansas City and some of its suburbs in Clay and Jackson counties, including North Kansas City, Gladstone, Independence, Lee's Summit, and some of Blue Springs. Before 2023, the district stretched east to Marshall and included Lafayette, Ray, and Saline counties.

== Composition ==
For the 118th and successive Congresses (based on redistricting following the 2020 census), and until 2025, the district contained all or portions of the following counties, townships, and municipalities:

Clay County (11)

Avondale, Claycomo (part; also 6th), Gladstone, Kansas City (part; also 4th and 6th; shared with Cass, Jackson, and Platte counties), North Kansas City, Oaks, Oakview, Oakwood, Oakwood Park, Pleasant Valley, Randolph

Jackson County (12)

Blue Springs (part; also 4th), Blue Summit, Grandview, Greenwood, Independence (part; also 4th and 6th), Kansas City (part; also 4th and 6th; shared with Cass, Clay, and Platte counties), Lake Lotawana (part; also 4th), Lake Tapawingo, Lee's Summit, Raytown, Sugar Creek (part; also 6th), Unity Village

== List of members representing this district ==
Member	Party	Years	Cong ress	Electoral history	District location
District created March 4, 1847
John S. Phelps (Springfield)	Democratic	March 4, 1847 – March 3, 1853	30th 31st 32nd	Redistricted from the at-large district and re-elected in 1846. Re-elected in 1848. Re-elected in 1850. Redistricted to the 6th district.	
John G. Miller (Boonville)	Whig	March 4, 1853 – March 3, 1855	33rd 34th	Redistricted from the 3rd district and re-elected in 1852. Re-elected in 1854. Died.	
John G. Miller (Boonville)	Opposition	March 4, 1855 – May 11, 1856	33rd 34th	Redistricted from the 3rd district and re-elected in 1852. Re-elected in 1854. Died.	
Vacant		May 11, 1856 – August 18, 1856	34th		
Thomas P. Akers (Lexington)	Know Nothing	August 18, 1856 – March 3, 1857	34th	Elected to finish Miller's term. Retired.	
Samuel H. Woodson (Independence)	Know Nothing	March 4, 1857 – March 3, 1861	35th 36th	Elected in 1856. Re-elected in 1858. Retired.	
John W. Reid (Jefferson City)	Democratic	March 4, 1861 – August 3, 1861	37th	Elected in 1860. Expelled for taking up arms against the Union.	
Vacant		August 3, 1861 – January 21, 1862	37th		
Thomas L. Price (Jefferson City)	Democratic	January 21, 1862 – March 3, 1863	37th	Elected to finish Reid's term. Lost re-election.	
Joseph W. McClurg (Linn Creek)	Unconditional Unionist	March 4, 1863 – March 3, 1865	38th 39th 40th	Elected in 1862. Re-elected in 1864. Re-elected in 1866. Resigned when elected Governor of Missouri.	
Joseph W. McClurg (Linn Creek)	Republican	March 4, 1865 – 1868	38th 39th 40th	Elected in 1862. Re-elected in 1864. Re-elected in 1866. Resigned when elected Governor of Missouri.	
Vacant		???, 1868 – December 7, 1868	40th		
John H. Stover (Versailles)	Republican	December 7, 1868 – March 3, 1869	40th	Elected November 3, 1868, to finish McClurg's term. Retired.	
Samuel S. Burdett (Osceola)	Republican	March 4, 1869 – March 3, 1873	41st 42nd	Elected in 1868. Re-elected in 1870. Lost re-election.	
Richard P. Bland (Lebanon)	Democratic	March 4, 1873 – March 3, 1883	43rd 44th 45th 46th 47th	Elected in 1872. Re-elected in 1874. Re-elected in 1876. Re-elected in 1878. Re-elected in 1880. Redistricted to the 11th district.	
Alexander Graves (Lexington)	Democratic	March 4, 1883 – March 3, 1885	48th	Elected in 1882. Lost re-election.	
William Warner (Kansas City)	Republican	March 4, 1885 – March 3, 1889	49th 50th	Elected in 1884. Re-elected in 1886. Retired.	
John C. Tarsney (Kansas City)	Democratic	March 4, 1889 – February 27, 1896	51st 52nd 53rd 54th	Elected in 1888. Re-elected in 1890. Re-elected in 1892. Re-elected in 1894. Lost contested election.	
Robert T. Van Horn (Kansas City)	Republican	February 27, 1896 – March 3, 1897	54th	Won contested election. Lost renomination.	
William S. Cowherd (Kansas City)	Democratic	March 4, 1897 – March 3, 1905	55th 56th 57th 58th	Elected in 1896. Re-elected in 1898. Re-elected in 1900. Re-elected in 1902. Lost re-election.	
Edgar C. Ellis (Kansas City)	Republican	March 4, 1905 – March 3, 1909	59th 60th	Elected in 1904. Re-elected in 1906. Lost re-election.	
William P. Borland (Kansas City)	Democratic	March 4, 1909 – February 20, 1919	61st 62nd 63rd 64th 65th	Elected in 1908. Re-elected in 1910. Re-elected in 1912. Re-elected in 1914. Re-elected in 1916. Lost renomination and died before term ended.	
Vacant		February 20, 1919 – March 3, 1919	65th		
William T. Bland (Kansas City)	Democratic	March 4, 1919 – March 3, 1921	66th	Elected in 1918. Lost re-election.	
Edgar C. Ellis (Kansas City)	Republican	March 4, 1921 – March 3, 1923	67th	Elected in 1920. Lost re-election.	
Henry L. Jost (Kansas City)	Democratic	March 4, 1923 – March 3, 1925	68th	Elected in 1922. Retired.	
Edgar C. Ellis (Kansas City)	Republican	March 4, 1925 – March 3, 1927	69th	Elected in 1924. Lost re-election.	
George H. Combs Jr. (Kansas City)	Democratic	March 4, 1927 – March 3, 1929	70th	Elected in 1926. Retired.	
Edgar C. Ellis (Kansas City)	Republican	March 4, 1929 – March 3, 1931	71st	Elected in 1928. Lost re-election.	
Joe Shannon (Kansas City)	Democratic	March 4, 1931 – March 3, 1933	72nd	Elected in 1930. Redistricted to the at-large district.	
District inactive		March 4, 1933 – January 3, 1935	73rd	All representatives elected At-large.	
Joe Shannon (Kansas City)	Democratic	January 3, 1935 – January 3, 1943	74th 75th 76th 77th	Redistricted from the at-large district and re-elected in 1934. Re-elected in 1936. Re-elected in 1938. Re-elected in 1940. Retired.	
Roger C. Slaughter (Kansas City)	Democratic	January 3, 1943 – January 3, 1947	78th 79th	Elected in 1942. Re-elected in 1944. Lost renomination.	
Albert L. Reeves Jr. (Kansas City)	Republican	January 3, 1947 – January 3, 1949	80th	Elected in 1946. Lost re-election.	
Richard W. Bolling (Kansas City)	Democratic	January 3, 1949 – January 3, 1983	81st 82nd 83rd 84th 85th 86th 87th 88th 89th 90th 91st 92nd 93rd 94th 95th 96th 97th	Elected in 1948. Re-elected in 1950. Re-elected in 1952. Re-elected in 1954. Re-elected in 1956. Re-elected in 1958. Re-elected in 1960. Re-elected in 1962. Re-elected in 1964. Re-elected in 1966. Re-elected in 1968. Re-elected in 1970. Re-elected in 1972. Re-elected in 1974. Re-elected in 1976. Re-elected in 1978. Re-elected in 1980. Retired.	
Alan Wheat (Kansas City)	Democratic	January 3, 1983 – January 3, 1995	98th 99th 100th 101st 102nd 103rd	Elected in 1982. Re-elected in 1984. Re-elected in 1986. Re-elected in 1988. Re-elected in 1990. Re-elected in 1992. Retired to run for U.S. Senator.	1983–1993 [data missing]
Alan Wheat (Kansas City)	Democratic	January 3, 1983 – January 3, 1995	98th 99th 100th 101st 102nd 103rd	Elected in 1982. Re-elected in 1984. Re-elected in 1986. Re-elected in 1988. Re-elected in 1990. Re-elected in 1992. Retired to run for U.S. Senator.	1993–2003 [data missing]
Karen McCarthy (Kansas City)	Democratic	January 3, 1995 – January 3, 2005	104th 105th 106th 107th 108th	Elected in 1994. Re-elected in 1996. Re-elected in 1998. Re-elected in 2000. Re-elected in 2002. Retired.	1993–2003 [data missing]
Karen McCarthy (Kansas City)	Democratic	January 3, 1995 – January 3, 2005	104th 105th 106th 107th 108th	Elected in 1994. Re-elected in 1996. Re-elected in 1998. Re-elected in 2000. Re-elected in 2002. Retired.	2003–2013
Emanuel Cleaver (Kansas City)	Democratic	January 3, 2005 – present	109th 110th 111th 112th 113th 114th 115th 116th 117th 118th 119th	Elected in 2004. Re-elected in 2006. Re-elected in 2008. Re-elected in 2010. Re-elected in 2012. Re-elected in 2014. Re-elected in 2016. Re-elected in 2018. Re-elected in 2020. Re-elected in 2022. Re-elected in 2024. Re-elected in 2026.	2003–2013
Emanuel Cleaver (Kansas City)	Democratic	January 3, 2005 – present	109th 110th 111th 112th 113th 114th 115th 116th 117th 118th 119th	Elected in 2004. Re-elected in 2006. Re-elected in 2008. Re-elected in 2010. Re-elected in 2012. Re-elected in 2014. Re-elected in 2016. Re-elected in 2018. Re-elected in 2020. Re-elected in 2022. Re-elected in 2024. Re-elected in 2026.	2013–2023
Emanuel Cleaver (Kansas City)	Democratic	January 3, 2005 – present	109th 110th 111th 112th 113th 114th 115th 116th 117th 118th 119th	Elected in 2004. Re-elected in 2006. Re-elected in 2008. Re-elected in 2010. Re-elected in 2012. Re-elected in 2014. Re-elected in 2016. Re-elected in 2018. Re-elected in 2020. Re-elected in 2022. Re-elected in 2024. Re-elected in 2026.	2023–present

== Recent election results from statewide races ==
Year	Office	Results
2008	President	Obama 63–36%
2012	President	Obama 61–39%
2012	Senate	McCaskill 67–27%
2012	Governor	Nixon 66–31%
2016	President	Clinton 57–37%
2016	Senate	Kander 63–33%
2016	Governor	Koster 61–35%
2016	Lt. Governor	Carnahan 58–36%
2016	Secretary of State	Smith 54–41%
2016	Attorney General	Hensley 58–42%
2018	Senate	McCaskill 63–34%
2018	Auditor	Galloway 66–29%
2020	President	Biden 62–36%
2020	Governor	Galloway 61–37%
2020	Lt. Governor	Canady 60–37%
2020	Secretary of State	Faleti 57–39%
2020	Treasurer	Englund 58–38%
2020	Attorney General	Finneran 58–38%
2022	Senate	Busch Valentine 62–35%
2024	President	Harris 61–37%
2024	Senate	Kunce 62–35%
2024	Governor	Quade 60–38%
2024	Lt. Governor	Brown 59–36%
2024	Secretary of State	Phifer 60–37%
2024	Treasurer	Osmack 58–37%
2024	Attorney General	Gross 59–38%

== Election results ==
=== 2002 ===
United States House of Representatives elections in Missouri, 2002
Party	Candidate	Votes	%	±%
Democratic	Karen McCarthy (Incumbent)	122,645	65.88%	
Republican	Stephen J. Gordeon	60,245	32.36%	
Libertarian	Jeanne F. Bojarski	3,277	1.76%	
Total votes		186,167	100%	
Majority				
Turnout				
Democratic hold		Swing		

=== 2004 ===
United States House of Representatives elections in Missouri, 2004
Party	Candidate	Votes	%	±%
Democratic	Emanuel Cleaver	161,727	55.19%	
Republican	Jeanne M. Patterson	123,431	42.12%	
Libertarian	Richard Alan Bailie	5,827	1.99%	
Constitution	Darin Rodenberg	2,040	0.70%	
Total votes		293,025	100%	
Majority				
Turnout				
Democratic hold		Swing		

=== 2006 ===
US House election, 2006: Missouri District 5
Party	Candidate	Votes	%	±%
Democratic	Emanuel Cleaver (Incumbent)	136,149	64.2	
Republican	Jacob Turk	68,456	32.3	
Libertarian	Randall Langkraehr	7,314	3.5	
Majority		67,693	31.9	
Turnout		211,919		
Democratic hold		Swing		

=== 2008 ===
United States House of Representatives elections in Missouri, 2008
Party	Candidate	Votes	%	±%
Democratic	Emanuel Cleaver (Incumbent)	197,249	64.37%	
Republican	Jacob Turk	109,166	35.63%	
Total votes		306,415	100%	
Democratic hold		Swing		

=== 2010 ===
United States House of Representatives elections in Missouri, 2010
Party	Candidate	Votes	%	±%
Democratic	Emanuel Cleaver (Incumbent)	102,076	53.30%	
Republican	Jacob Turk	84,578	44.20%	
Total votes		191,423	100%	
Democratic hold		Swing		

=== 2012 ===
United States House of Representatives elections in Missouri, 2012
Party	Candidate	Votes	%	±%
Democratic	Emanuel Cleaver (Incumbent)	196,467	60.2%	
Republican	Jacob Turk	121,437	37.2%	
Libertarian	Randy Langkraehr	8,342	2.6%	
Democratic hold		Swing		

=== 2014 ===
United States House of Representatives elections in Missouri, 2014
Party	Candidate	Votes	%	±%
Democratic	Emanuel Cleaver (Incumbent)	79,256	51.59%	
Republican	Jacob Turk	69,071	44.96%	
Libertarian	Roy Welborn	5,308	3.45%	
Democratic hold		Swing		

=== 2016 ===
United States House of Representatives elections in Missouri, 2016
Party	Candidate	Votes	%	±%
Democratic	Emanuel Cleaver (Incumbent)	190,766	58.8%	
Republican	Jacob Turk	123,771	38.2%	
Libertarian	Roy Welborn	9,733	3%	
Democratic hold		Swing		

=== 2018 ===
United States House of Representatives elections in Missouri, 2018
Party	Candidate	Votes	%	±%
Democratic	Emanuel Cleaver (Incumbent)	175,019	61.7%	
Republican	Jacob Turk	101,069	35.6%	
Libertarian	Alexander Howell	4,725	1%	
Democratic hold		Swing		

=== 2020 ===
United States House of Representatives elections in Missouri, 2020
Party	Candidate	Votes	%	±%
Democratic	Emanuel Cleaver (incumbent)	207,180	58.8	
Republican	Ryan Derks	135,934	38.6	
Libertarian	Robin Dominick	9,272	2.6	
Write-in		44	0.0	
Total votes		352,430	100.0	
Democratic hold				

=== 2022 ===
United States House of Representatives elections in Missouri, 2022
Party	Candidate	Votes	%	±%
Democratic	Emanuel Cleaver (incumbent)	140,688	61.0	
Republican	Jacob Turk	84,008	36.4	
Libertarian	Robin Dominick	5,859	2.54	
Total votes		230,555	100.0	
Democratic hold				

=== 2024 ===
United States House of Representatives elections in Missouri, 2024
Party	Candidate	Votes	%
Democratic	Emanuel Cleaver (incumbent)	199,900	60.2
Republican	Sean Smith	120,957	36.4
Libertarian	Bill Wayne	6,658	2.0
Green	Michael Day	4,414	1.3
Total votes		331,929	100.0
Democratic hold			

== Historical district boundaries ==
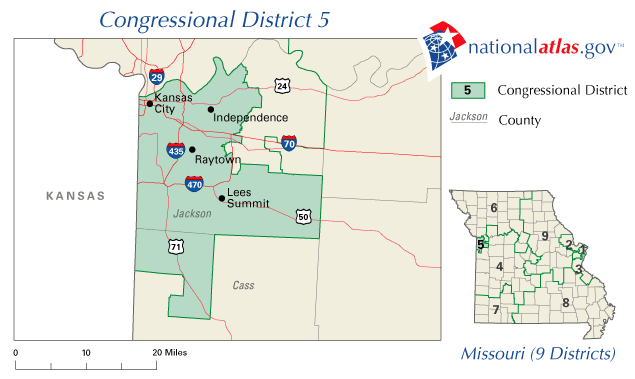
2003-2013

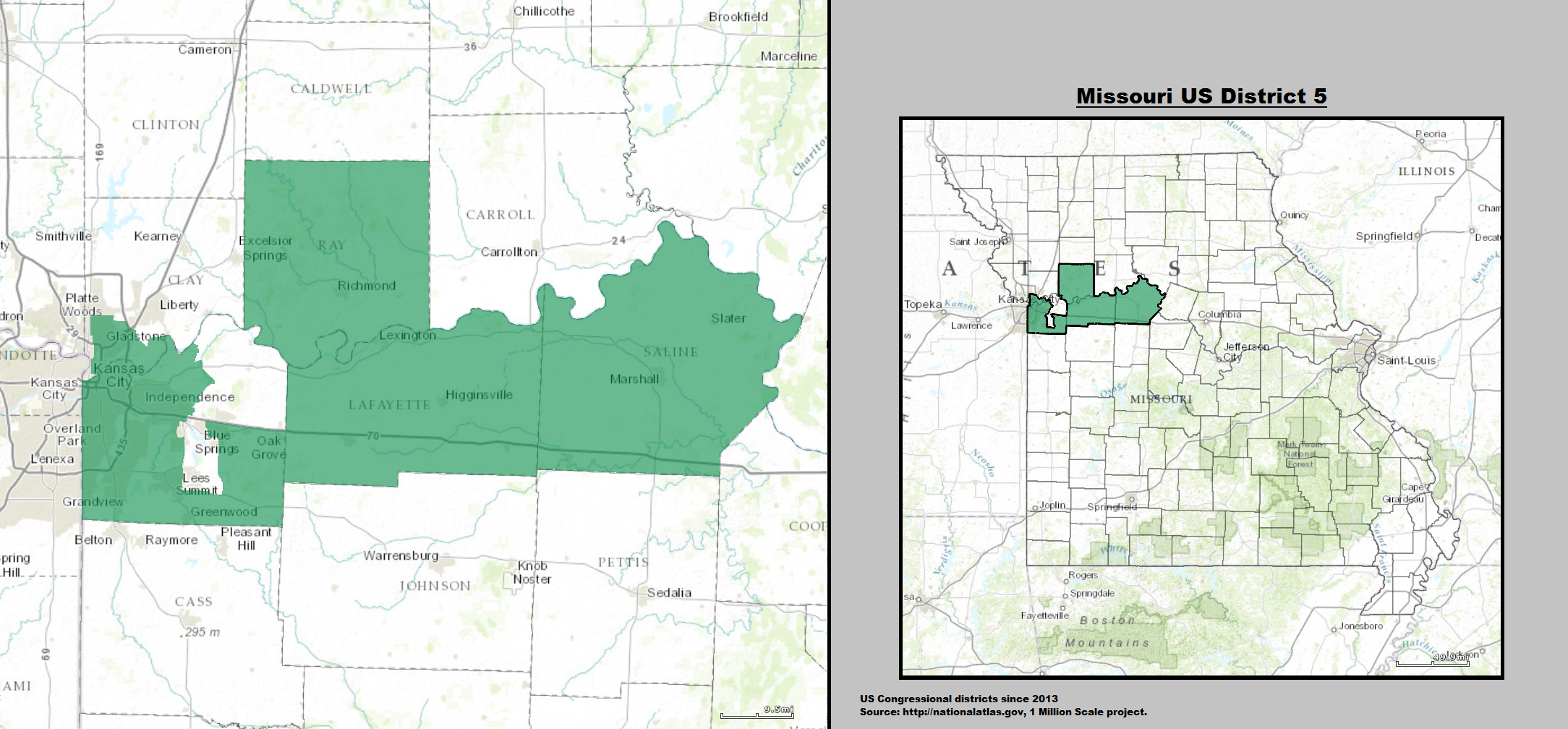
2013-2023

== See also ==
- Missouri's congressional districts
- List of United States congressional districts
- Gerrymandering in the United States
