= William Jackson Brack =

American politician

1st Mayor of Orlando, Florida
- In office 1875–1877
- Preceded by: Office established
- Succeeded by: John Howard Allen

Member of the Florida House of Representatives from Brevard County
- In office 1885–1887
- Preceded by: Francis Platt
- Succeeded by: Riley Johnson

Personal details
- Born: June 17, 1837 Georgia
- Died: April 30, 1901 (aged 63)
- Resting place: Mount Peace Cemetery, Saint Cloud, Florida
- Spouse(s): Olive Chancey, Amy, Eliza Alpha Tyson

Military service
- Allegiance: Confederate States of America
- Branch/service: Confederate States Army
- Unit: 27th Louisiana Infantry Regiment, Company C
- Battles/wars: American Civil War

William Jackson Brack (June 17, 1837 – April 30, 1901) was the first mayor of Orlando, Florida from 1875 to 1877. He served in the Florida House of Representatives from Brevard County from 1885 to 1887.

He was born to John and Eliza (McCall) Brack in Georgia on June 17, 1837. He married firstly to the former Olive Chancey (1838–1864) of Clinch County, Georgia, by whom he had two sons who died young. The Bracks removed to Alexandria, Louisiana before the outbreak of the American Civil War. During that conflict, the future mayor served in Company C of the 27th Louisiana Infantry Regiment.

After the war, the widowed Brack came to Florida, where he married his second wife Amy (July 5, 1847 - May 25, 1880). They had three daughters before her untimely death: Olive, Bessie, and Josphine Brack.

It is unclear exactly when Brack settled in the Orlando area. He was certainly there by October 16, 1873, when he was mentioned as guardian ad litem for the orphans of Mrs. Lucinda Hughey Terrell in a lawsuit filed in the circuit court of Orange County, Florida.

In 1875, when Orlando was formally incorporated, Brack was elected its first mayor. He was subsequently re-elected to a second one-year term.

After leaving office, the former mayor remained in the Orlando area as a farmer and fruit grower until at least 1880. He was married there to his third wife Eliza Alpha Tyson on March 6, 1881. They had eight children: John Percy ("Jack"), Rosa Banner, Gussie, Emma Hortense, Ruby B, Blanche Alice, and Lillian Bell Brack, William Jackson, Jr

The Bracks left Orlando to live on the north shore of Lake Tohopekaliga in what is now Osceola County, Florida, where they operated a general store and sawmill at "Brack's Landing." From that point, he also captained a 35-foot sidewheel steamboat called "Spray" along the inland canals that connected the Kissimmee River valley to Fort Myers, Florida on the Gulf of Mexico.

The former mayor retired to a cattle ranch near Narcoossee, Florida, where he died April 30, 1901. He is buried at Mount Peace Cemetery in Saint Cloud, Florida.

== See also ==
- List of members of the Florida House of Representatives from Brevard County, Florida

Preceded by Office established	Mayor of Orlando, Florida; 1875–1877	Succeeded by John Howard Allen
Preceded by Francis Platt	Member of the Florida House of Representatives from Brevard County; 1885–1887	Succeeded by Riley Johnson
