= Willis Lucullus Palmer =

American politician (1854–1912)

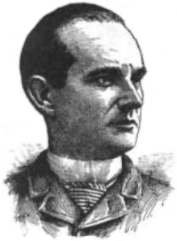

12th Mayor of Orlando
- In office 1891–1893
- Preceded by: Matthew Robinson Marks
- Succeeded by: Mahlon Gore

Personal details
- Born: December 13, 1854 Troup County, Georgia, U.S.
- Died: October 30, 1912 (aged 57) Orlando, Florida, U.S.
- Party: Democratic
- Spouse: Martha Bayne McAlister (m. 1891)
- Children: 3
- Occupation: Lawyer

Willis Lucullus Palmer (December 13, 1854 – October 30, 1912) was an American politician who served as the twelfth mayor of Orlando, Florida, from 1891 to 1893. He was also the president of Hamilton College.

== Biography ==
Willis Lucullus Palmer was born in Troup County, Georgia on December 13, 1854.

He married Martha B. McAllister on March 4, 1891.

He died in Orlando on October 30, 1912, and was interred at Greenwood Cemetery.
