= William T. Bland =

American politician (1861–1921)

William Thomas Bland
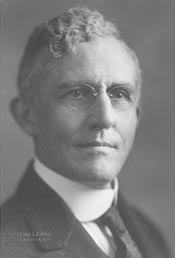

Member of the U.S. House of Representatives from Missouri's 5th district
- In office March 4, 1919 – March 3, 1921

Personal details
- Born: January 21, 1861 Weston, Virginia (now West Virginia)
- Died: January 15, 1928 (aged 66) Orlando, Florida, U.S.
- Resting place: Greenwood Cemetery; Orlando, Florida, U.S.
- Spouse: Bertha Helen McPike (m. 1891)
- Relations: James M. Jackson (cousin); Thomas Bland (grandfather); John G. Jackson (grandfather)
- Children: 1
- Parent: William John Bland (father)
- Education: West Virginia University (BS, LLB); University of Virginia Law School
- Occupation: Lawyer; judge; politician; banker

William Thomas Bland (January 21, 1861 – January 15, 1928) was an American lawyer and businessman born in what became West Virginia during the American Civil War and who served as a U.S. Representative from Missouri.

== Early life ==
William Thomas Bland was born on January 21, 1861, in Weston, the county seat of Lewis County, Virginia (in what would soon become West Virginia) to Columbia Ann Madison Jackson Duncan and her second husband, Dr. William John Bland (1816-1897). William T. Bland was descended from the First Families of Virginia. His father would represent Lewis County in the Virginia House of Delegates in 1863-1865, as well as become the chief surgeon of his brother-in-law CSA General Stonewall Jackson's Brigade and later become the President of the West Virginia Medical Association and superintendent of the West Virginia State Hospital for the Insane (1881-1889) His father's elder brother Newton B. Bland would also become a local physician. His farmer grandfather Thomas Bland (1793-1867) owned slaves in 1840 and served several terms in the Virginia House of Delegates beginning in 1823 and was one of Lewis County's delegates to the Virginia Constitutional Convention of 1850. His maternal grandfather John G. Jackson and cousin James M. Jackson also were prominent politicians in Harrison County for decades.

W. T. Bland graduated from the West Virginia University at Morgantown in 1883 with a Bachelor of Science and from the law department of that university in 1884 with a Bachelor of Laws. He then took a special course in law in Charlottesville, Virginia at the University of Virginia School of Law in 1885.

== Career ==
Admitted to the West Virginia bar, Bland began practicing law in his native Weston, Lewis County, West Virginia. Bland moved west to Atchison, Kansas, in 1887, where he became the prosecuting attorney of Atchison County, Kansas (from 1890 to 1892) and won election as mayor of Atchison in 1894. Bland was elected judge of the second Kansas district in 1896. He was reelected in 1900, but resigned in 1901.

He entered the wholesale drug business in 1901 and moved to Kansas City, Missouri in 1904. He was the vice president and later president of the McPike Drug Company of Kansas City until 1917. He then became a banker. In 1907, Bland was elected as president of the Manufacturers and Merchants' Association of Kansas City. In 1909, he was elected as president of the Kansas City Commercial Club. He was elected to a second term but declined to serve.

Meanwhile, Bland's political career began as he became chairman of the Kansas City River and Harbor Improvement Commission 1909-1918, director of the National Rivers and Harbors Congress, and vice president of the Mississippi Valley Waterway Association. Bland won election to the Kansas City Board of Education in 1912 for a six-year term and served as vice president and president. Bland also served as chairman of the First Liberty Loan campaign in Kansas City for World War I. He served in later liberty loan committees.

He ran as a Democrat to represent Missouri's 5th congressional district in the Sixty-sixth Congress (March 4, 1919 – March 3, 1921), but lost his bid for reelection in 1920 to the Sixty-seventh Congress.

Bland moved to Florida and settled in Orlando in 1921. He engaged in banking, become president of the First National Bank of Orlando in 1921, and served as a member of the Orlando Utilities Commission for three years. He also served as vice president of the First Bond and Mortgage Company.

== Personal life ==
Bland married Bertha Helen McPike of Atchison, Kansas on August 19, 1891. They had one son, William T. Bland Jr. (1894-1990) Bland was Episcopalian.

Bland died at his home at 716 South Orange Avenue in Orlando on January 15, 1928, and was buried in Greenwood Cemetery. His elder brother Meigs Bland (1859-) would marry Lutie, the daughter of Virginia Judge John James Allen and their son Major William John Bland would drill many soldiers in Kansas City before dying heroically in World War I. Major Bland is buried at Arlington National Cemetery and become the namesake of Kansas City's American Legion post.

U.S. House of Representatives
Preceded by William P. Borland	Member of the U.S. House of Representatives from Missouri's 5th congressional district 1919-1921	Succeeded by Edgar C. Ellis
