= James Horace Smith =

American politician (1852–1931)

17th Mayor of Orlando
- In office 1904–1906
- Preceded by: B. M. Robinson
- Succeeded by: Braxton Beacham

Personal details
- Born: October 20, 1852
- Died: June 20, 1931 (aged 78)
- Spouse: Martha Philo Smith
- Children: Ethel Claire Smith Bumby
- Occupation: Physician

James Horace Smith (October 20, 1852 – June 20, 1931) was an American politician who served as the 17th mayor of Orlando, Florida, from 1904 to 1906. He died at the age of 78 in 1931 and was buried in Greenwood Cemetery.
