= Latta Malette Autrey =

American politician (1876–1938)

Latta Autrey
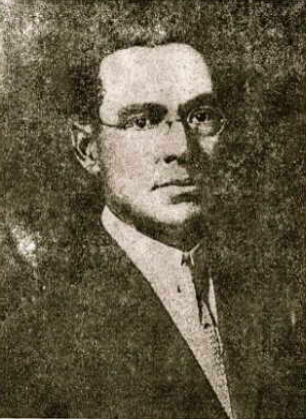

25th Mayor of Orlando
- In office January 1, 1926 – January 1, 1929
- Preceded by: James LeRoy Giles
- Succeeded by: James LeRoy Giles

Personal details
- Born: July 7, 1876 Cumberland County, North Carolina, U.S.
- Died: May 17, 1938 (aged 61) Jacksonville, Florida, U.S.
- Resting place: Sunset Hill Cemetery in Valdosta, Georgia, U.S.
- Spouse: Leila Brannan
- Profession: Politician

Latta Malette "LM" Autrey (July 7, 1876 – May 17, 1938) was an American politician who served one term as the 25th mayor of Orlando, Florida, from 1926 to 1929. Two of his former homes are now designated as historical landmarks, the Autrey-Williams House in Newton, Texas, built in 1912 and currently being restored by David Holmes, as well as the L. M. Autrey House in the Lake Eola Heights Neighborhood in Orlando, Florida.

== Early life ==
Latta Malette Autrey was born on July 7, 1876, in Cumberland County, North Carolina, the first of six children born to Alfred Randley (1847-1892) and Elizabeth R. (née Johnson) Autrey (1855-1892). He was likely born in/near Eastover, North Carolina, as that is where he lived in 1880.

== Marriage and children ==
Autrey married Leila Brannan on November 1, 1903, in Greene County, Mississippi. He had first met her there. They then decided to live there until around 1908 when the turpentine industry was exhausted. They then moved to Jasper, Texas. They had 7 children in the course of their marriage, Gladys, Lottie Mae, Anna "Annie" Rosa, Latta Malette Jr. (who died at 3 years 9 months), Olive "Ollie", Elizabeth "Bessie", and Walter. The first three were born in Mississippi, and the rest were born in Texas.

== Orlando Mayorship ==
Sometime before 1926, the family moved to Orlando, Florida. There, Latta decided to run for mayor, and won. He assumed duty on January 1, 1926. On January 1, 1929, he was replaced by his predecessor James LeRoy Giles. Following his defeat, the family relocated yet again to Valdosta, Georgia.

== Death ==
Autrey died of coronary thrombosis caused by arterial hypertension and atherosclerosis on May 17, 1938, in Jacksonville, Florida. He was 61 years old. He was interred at Sunset Hill Cemetery.

Political offices
Preceded by James LeRoy Giles	Mayor of Orlando, Florida; 1926-1929	Succeeded by James LeRoy Giles
