= E. Frank Sperry =

American politician (1843–1916)

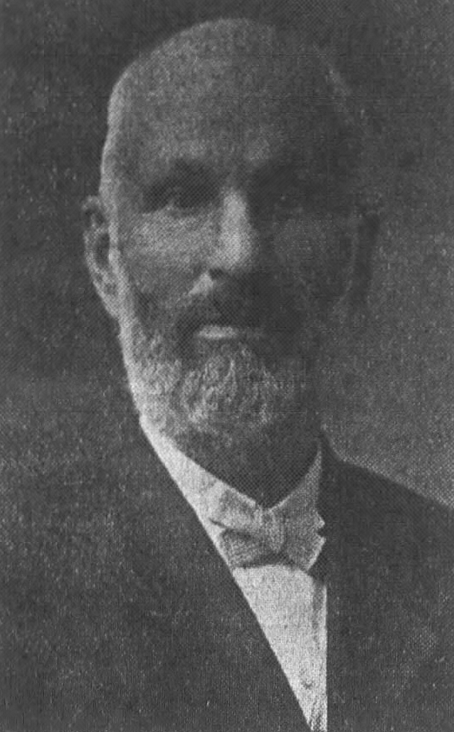

21st Mayor of Orlando
- In office 1913 – August 13, 1916
- Preceded by: William Hayden Reynolds
- Succeeded by: James LeRoy Giles

Personal details
- Born: Ezra Frank Sperry; June 18, 1843 Bethany, Connecticut
- Died: August 13, 1916 (aged 73) Orlando, Florida
- Spouse: Mary W. Pratt (m. 1869)
- Education: Eastman Business College
- Occupation: Businessman

Ezra Frank Sperry (June 18, 1843 – August 13, 1916) was an American politician who served as the 21st mayor of Orlando, Florida, from 1913 to 1916.

== Biography ==
E. Frank Sperry was born in Bethany, Connecticut, on June 18, 1843. He was educated at Eastman Business College. He worked as a grocery clerk before starting his own company, Sperry Manufacturing. He married Mary W. Pratt on October 13, 1869.

He moved to Orlando in 1882 and organized the South Florida Foundry and Machine Works.

He was elected mayor of Orlando in 1913. He died in office from Bright's disease on August 13, 1916, at the age of 73.
