= 2019 Orlando mayoral election =

- November 5, 2019
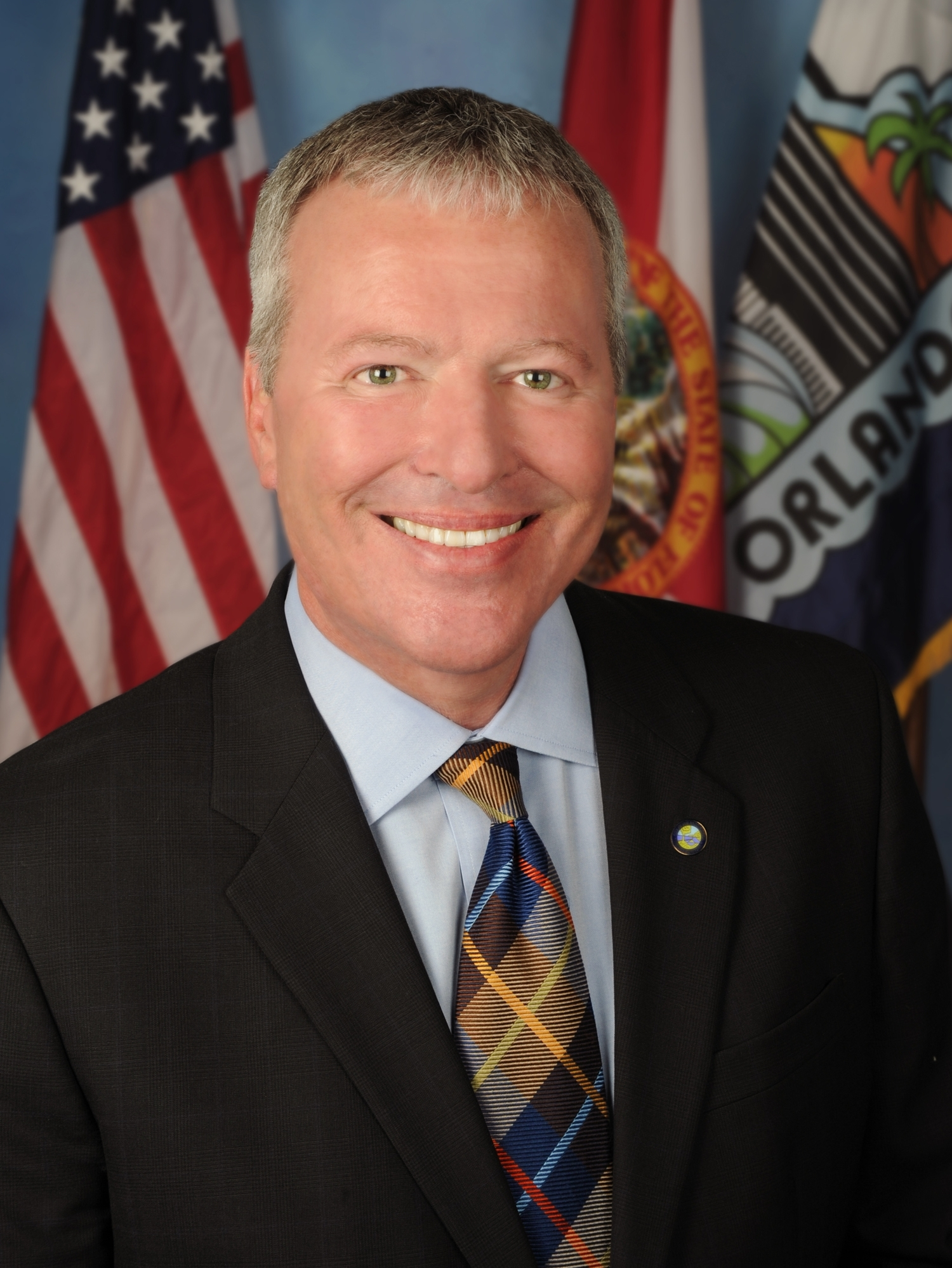

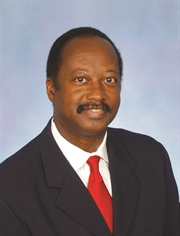

Candidate	Buddy Dyer	Sam Ings	Aretha Simons
Party	Nonpartisan	Nonpartisan	Nonpartisan
Popular vote	15,957	3,883	2,387
Percentage	71.79%	17.47%	10.74%
Mayor before election
Buddy Dyer
Nonpartisan
Elected mayor
Buddy Dyer
Nonpartisan

The 2019 Orlando mayoral election took place on November 5, 2019. Incumbent Mayor Buddy Dyer ran for re-election to a fifth full term. He was challenged by City Councilman Sam Ings and nonprofit businesswoman Aretha Simons. Dyer was a favorite to win re-election, winning the endorsements of prominent local politicians and significantly outraising his opponents. He ultimately won re-election in a landslide, receiving 72 percent of the vote to Ings's 17 percent and Simons's 11 percent.

== General election ==
=== Candidates ===
- Buddy Dyer, incumbent Mayor
- Sam Ings, City Councilman, 2004 candidate for Mayor
- Aretha Simons, nonprofit businesswoman, U.S. Navy veteran

==== Dropped out ====
- Shantel Bennett

=== Campaign ===
Dyer, the longest-serving Mayor in city history, sought a fifth term as Mayor, citing his accomplishments in establishing Orlando as "one of the top job-growth markets and tourism destinations in the country." City Councilman Sam Ings, a consistent opponent of Dyer's initiatives on the council, announced that he would run against Dyer, whom he argued had "been there long enough already" and had "become[] very complacent." Simons similarly argued that "[p]eople are tired of career politicians" and suggested that Dyer "thinks he's untouchable."

The Orlando Sentinel endorsed Dyer for re-election, noting that while "Dyer has continued to do a solid job of running a city that's on the move," neither Ings nor Simons "presents a compelling case for unseating" him.

=== Polling ===
Poll source	Date(s) administered	Sample size (Note: Key: A – all adults RV – registered voters LV – likely voters V – unclear)	Margin of error	Shantele Bennett	Buddy Dyer	Sam Ings	Aretha Simons	Undecided
St. Pete Polls	July 20–22, 2019	325 (RV)	± 4.0%	10%	52%	11%	4%	23%

=== Results ===
2019 Orlando mayoral election results
Party	Candidate	Votes	%
Nonpartisan	Buddy Dyer (inc.)	15,957	71.79%
Nonpartisan	Sam Ings	3,883	17.47%
Nonpartisan	Aretha Simons	2,387	10.74%
Total votes		22,227	100.00%
