= 2003 Orlando mayoral special election =

2003 Orlando mayoral election
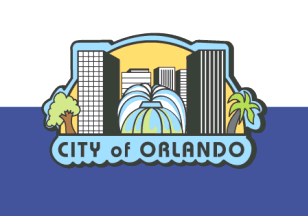
- February 4, 2003 (primary election); February 25, 2003 (runoff election)
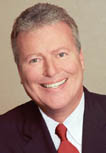

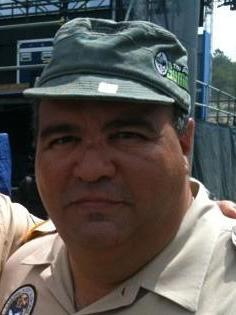

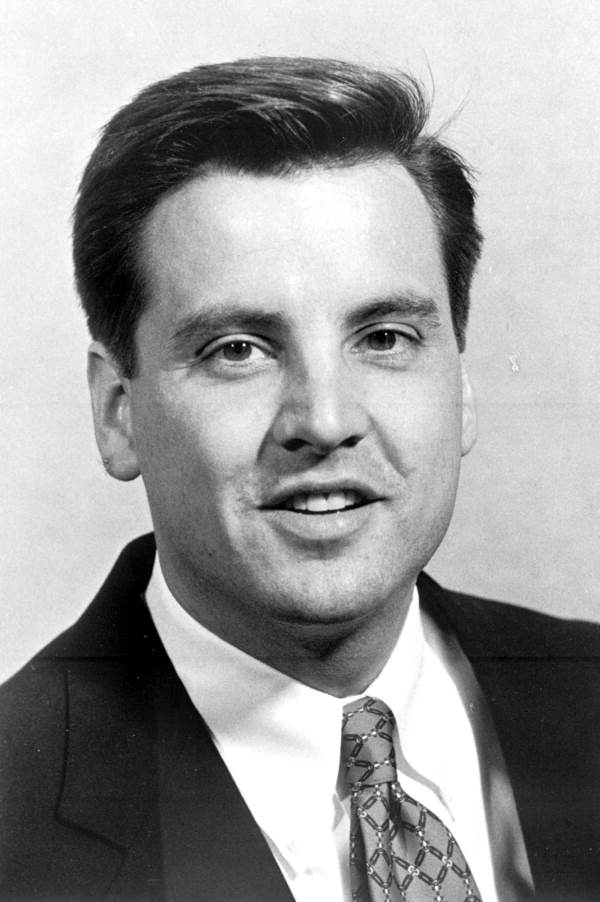
Candidate	Buddy Dyer	Pete Barr
Party	Nonpartisan	Nonpartisan
First round	8,826; 32.60%	6,033; 22.68%
Runoff	17,039; 57.33%	12,681; 42.67%
Candidate	Tico Perez	Bill Sublette
Party	Nonpartisan	Nonpartisan
First round	4,316; 15.94%	3,580; 13.22%
Runoff	Eliminated	Eliminated
Mayor before election
Glenda Hood
Nonpartisan
Elected mayor
Buddy Dyer
Nonpartisan

The 2003 Orlando mayoral special election took place on February 25, 2003, following a primary election on February 4, 2003. Mayor Glenda Hood, who was last elected in 2000, resigned following her nomination as Secretary of State of Florida, triggering a special election.

Eight candidates ran in the special election, the largest number of candidates in city history. Former State Senator Buddy Dyer, former State Representative Bill Sublette advertising executive Pete Barr, attorney Tico Perez, and businessman Derrick Wallace emerged as the frontrunners. In the primary election, Dyer placed first, winning 33 percent of the vote, and he was followed by Barr, who won 22 percent of the vote. In the runoff election, though polls indicated a close race, Dyer defeated Barr in a landslide, winning 57 percent of the vote.

== Primary election ==
=== Candidates ===
- Buddy Dyer, former State Senator, 2002 Democratic nominee for Attorney General
- Pete Barr, advertising executive
- Tico Perez, attorney, Chairman of the Orlando Utilities Commission
- Bill Sublette, former State Representative
- Derrick Wallace, businessman
- Wayne Rich, real estate developer
- Sharon Leichering, businesswoman, former city employee
- Alex Lamour, perennial candidate

==== Dropped out ====
- Doug Guetzloe, anti-tax activist
- Homer Hartage, County Commissioner

=== Campaign ===
After Governor Jeb Bush was re-elected in 2002, he announced that he would nominate Mayor Glenda Hood to serve as Secretary of State. Hood tendered her resignation as Mayor, which triggered a special election. Several high-profile candidates announced that they would run, including former State Senator Buddy Dyer, former State Representative Bill Sublette, County Commissioner Homer Hartage, advertising executive Pete Barr, and businessman Derrick Wallace. Hartage, who would have had to resign his seat on the County Commission under Florida's resign-to-run law, challenged the legality of the election timing, but after his lawsuit was dismissed, he dropped out of the race.

During the campaign, Hood disclosed that the city ended the fiscal year with a $12 million deficit and anticipated a $14 million deficit in the coming fiscal year, which shifted the focus of the campaign. Barr claimed that he could cut $50 million in "fluff" from the city budget, but did not identify which projects he would cut. Dyer, a former state senator, emphasized that his experience in "making tough budget decisions and prioritizing budget items" while in the legislature would help him deal with the shortfalls, while Sublette noted that he had previously called for a "thorough review of the budget" prior to the disclosure of the deficit.

Though the race was formally nonpartisan, the candidates mounted campaigns that focused on partisan themes. Barr, Perez, and Sublette were registered Republicans; Dyer, Rich, and Wallace were Democrats; and Lamour and Leichering were registered independents. Sublette campaigned as the "only candidate with a conservative Republican record," while Barr set out campaign literature advertising that he was the "better choice" for Republicans.

The Orlando Sentinel endorsed Dyer, noting that he "towers above the other high-profile candidates," and praising his "record for on behalf of this community during the past 10 years" in the legislature. The Sentinel criticized Barr for having a "limited" understanding of the city, Perez for "just mov[ing] into the city," and Sublette as not "forward thinking."

=== Polling ===
Poll source	Date(s) administered	Sample size (Note: Key: A – all adults RV – registered voters LV – likely voters V – unclear)	Margin of error	Buddy Dyer	Pete Barr	Bill Sublette	Tico Perez	Derrick Wallace	Wayne Rich	Sharon Leichering	Alex Lamour	Undecided
Mason-Dixon Polling & Strategy	January 21–22, 2003	625 (LV)	± 4.0%	22%	16%	14%	10%	5%	3%	2%	1%	27%

=== Results ===
Primary election results
Party	Candidate	Votes	%
Nonpartisan	Buddy Dyer	8,826	32.60%
Nonpartisan	Pete Barr	6,033	22.28%
Nonpartisan	Tico Perez	4,316	15.94%
Nonpartisan	Bill Sublette	3,580	13.22%
Nonpartisan	Derrick Wallace	2,746	10.14%
Nonpartisan	Wayne Rich	1,177	4.35%
Nonpartisan	Sharon Leichering	206	0.76%
Nonpartisan	Alex Lamour	190	0.70%
Total votes		27,074	100.00%

== General election ==
=== Polling ===
Poll source	Date(s) administered	Sample size	Margin of error	Buddy Dyer	Pete Barr	Undecided
Mason-Dixon Polling & Strategy	February 12–13, 2003	625 (LV)	± 4.0%	42%	43%	15%

=== Results ===
2003 Orlando mayoral special election results
Party	Candidate	Votes	%
Nonpartisan	Buddy Dyer	17,039	57.33%
Nonpartisan	Pete Barr	12,681	42.67%
Total votes		29,720	100.00%
