= Edna Giles Fuller =

American politician (1874–1952)

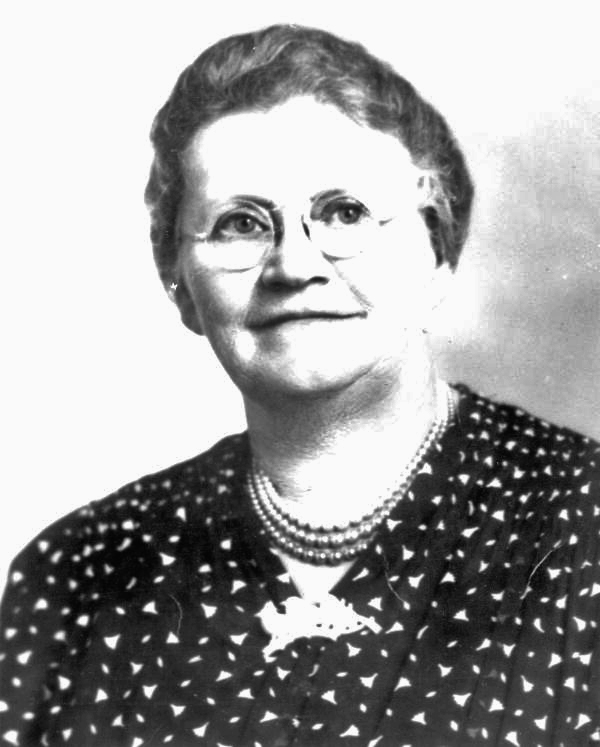

Member of the Florida House of Representatives
- In office 1928–1932
- Succeeded by: J. J. Dickinson

Personal details
- Born: 1874 near Tampa, Florida, U.S.
- Died: December 28, 1952 (aged 77–78) Orlando, Florida, U.S.
- Resting place: Greenwood Cemetery
- Party: Democratic
- Spouse: J. T. Fuller
- Education: Rollins College (BA)

Edna Giles Fuller (1874 – December 28, 1952) was an American educator and politician who was the first woman elected to the Florida Legislature, serving in the Florida House of Representatives from 1928 to 1932.

Edna Giles Fuller was born in 1874 on a farm near Tampa, Florida. When she was 14, she would move to Orlando to live with her uncle James LeRoy Giles, a businessman and a real estate investor who would be the future mayor of Orlando. She would go to high school in Orlando and later attended Rollins College for a year before going to "Centenary" in Columbus, Ohio where she finished her Bachelor of Arts degree.

Edna would end up going to Starke, Florida to be a teacher for a year before returning to Orlando where her uncle lived at resuming her teaching activities there. In 1904 she would marry John T. Fuller a lumberman from Tennessee who was a real estate partner of her uncle whom he met while she was away. She had two daughters before her husband died in 1912.

Prior to going into office, Fuller would serve in a variety of leadership roles. During World War 1 she served as the assistant food administrator for Florida and was the president of the Florida Woman Suffrage Association. She was also a member of several women's clubs and community boards. In 1919 she ended up becoming a trustee of Rollins College.

In 1928 she would run for the Florida House of Representatives under the name of "Mrs. J. T. Fuller" in the Democratic primary defeating her opponent in the primary, J.D. Beggs and was unopposed in the general election. She would be reelected for a second two-year term in 1930 with no opposition. She ran for another term in 1932 but lost to a judge named J. J. Dickinson.

She died on December 28, 1952, in Orlando, Florida, and was interred at Greenwood Cemetery.
