= William Henry Jewell =

American politician (1840–1912)

19th Mayor of Orlando
- In office 1907–1910
- Preceded by: Braxton Beacham
- Succeeded by: William Hayden Reynolds

Personal details
- Born: February 26, 1840 Wakefield, Massachusetts
- Died: January 2, 1912 (aged 71)
- Spouse: Carrie L. Stowell
- Occupation: Attorney, soldier

William Henry Jewell (February 26, 1840 – January 2, 1912) was an American politician and attorney who served as the 19th mayor of Orlando, Florida, from 1907 to 1910. He served in the civil war in the ranks of the twenty-first Mississippi Infantry to November 1862, when he assigned to staff duty at Charleston, S. C., until March, 1864, after which he served with General Wade Hampton until the surrender. He married his wife Carrie in 1879 and moved to Florida in 1886 where he practiced law and served two terms in the state legislature, spent time as a city attorney, and served three terms as Mayor of Orlando. He died suddenly at the age of 71 in 1912.
