= Glenda Hood =

American politician (born 1950)

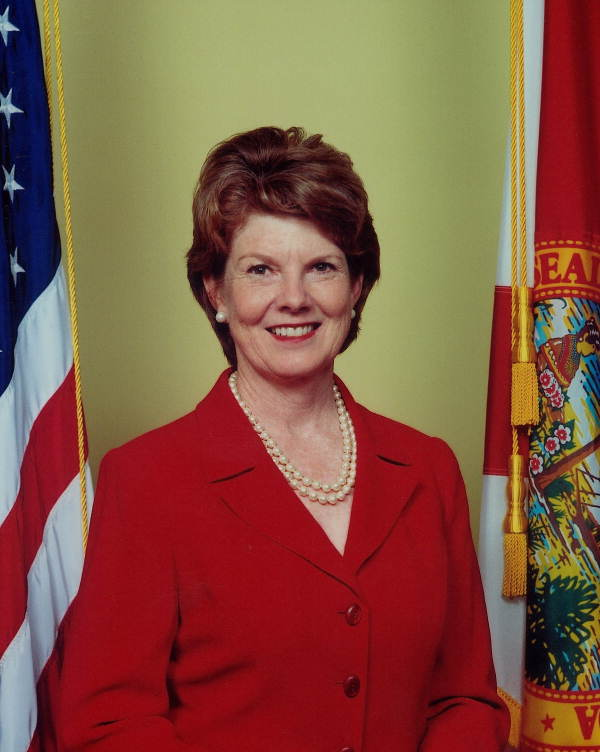
- Hood in 2004

25th Secretary of State of Florida
- In office May 2, 2003 – November 21, 2005
- Governor: Jeb Bush
- Preceded by: James C. Smith; Ken Detzner (acting)
- Succeeded by: Sue M. Cobb; David E. Mann (interim)

31st Mayor of Orlando
- In office November 1, 1992 – March 1, 2003
- Preceded by: Bill Frederick
- Succeeded by: Buddy Dyer

Member of the Orlando City Council
- In office 1982–1992

66th President of the National League of Cities
- In office 1992
- Preceded by: Sidney Barthelemy
- Succeeded by: Donald M. Fraser

Personal details
- Born: March 10, 1950 (age 76) Orlando, Florida, U.S.
- Party: Republican
- Spouse: Charlie Hood (m. 1971)
- Education: Rollins College

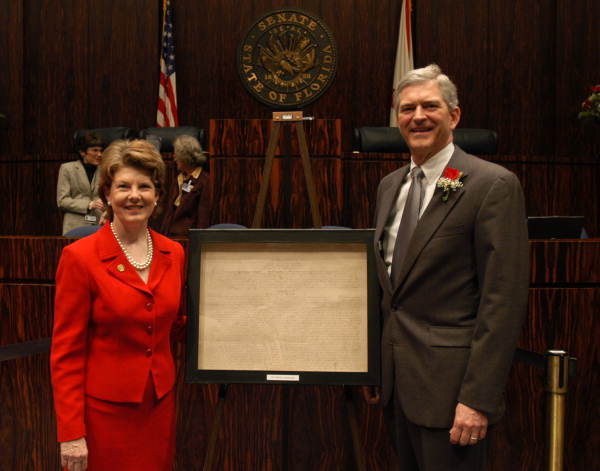
Hood and Senator Daniel Webster with the 1838 Florida Constitution in the Senate chamber

Glenda Evans Hood (born March 10, 1950) is an American politician, who was Secretary of State of Florida, from 2003 to 2005, and the first woman to serve as Mayor of Orlando (1992–2003). She is a member of the Republican Party.

== Biography ==
A Republican, Hood served as a district commissioner for the City of Orlando from 1982 to 1992, when she was elected Mayor. She was re-elected to 4-year terms as mayor in 1996 and 2000. Before her election to the Orlando City Council, she had served as vice-chairman of the Municipal Planning Board and Zoning Commission, member of the Nominating Board and Chairman of the Task Force on Board and Commission Restructure. She also has served as President of the National League of Cities, the Florida League of Cities, and the Florida Chamber of Commerce. Her presidency of the National League of the Cities was in 1992, during her final year on the Orlando City Council.

Hood's time as mayor coincided with Linda Chapin's chairmanship of the Orange County Commission, a time when feminine influence over local politics was at an all-time high. The two women, along with state senator (and future lieutenant governor) Toni Jennings and Dianna Fuller Morgan (Walt Disney World's Senior Vice President for Community and Government Relations), were recognized as the leaders of the local "old girl network." They formed close friendships despite surface political differences, and even took annual Christmas shopping trips to New York City together.

In January 2003, at the start of his second term as governor, Florida Governor Jeb Bush appointed Hood to the office of Secretary of State of Florida. She was Florida's first non-elected Secretary of State, serving in the position from May 2, 2003 until November 21, 2005. In March 2003, it was reported that Bush would appoint her as the new lieutenant governor to succeed Frank Brogan, who resigned. Bush instead named her old friend Jennings as lieutenant governor.

As Secretary of State she was at the center of controversy over her management of elections, including her order that voter registrations be invalidated as "incomplete" when the box for "US Citizen" was not checked, even though applicants signed the cards with a statement attesting they were citizens.

Hood served on the board of the national profit Afterschool Alliance, an organization that works to support after school programs for all children.

Hood endorsed former Massachusetts Governor Mitt Romney in the 2008 presidential election.

== Biographical details ==
A fourth-generation Floridian, Hood was born in Orlando and graduated from Oak Ridge High School there. She attended Rollins College, where she obtained a bachelor's degree in Spanish. She also completed a program at Harvard Kennedy School.

Married to Charles Hood, whom she met in high school while they were ushering a Florida Symphony Orchestra concert, she has three grown children (Monty, Ellis and Evans Hood) and several grandchildren.

In 2008, Hood was awarded the Mary Harriman Community Leadership award by The Association of Junior Leagues International, Inc. Hood is a member of the Junior League of Greater Orlando and served as the League's president from 1982 to 1983.

== See also ==
- 1992 Orlando mayoral election
- 1996 Orlando mayoral election
- 2000 Orlando mayoral election

Political offices
Preceded by Ken Detzner; Acting	Secretary of State of Florida; 2003–2005	Succeeded by David E. Mann; Interim
