= 1996 Orlando mayoral election =

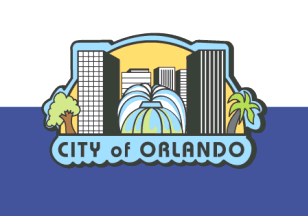
- April 16, 1996
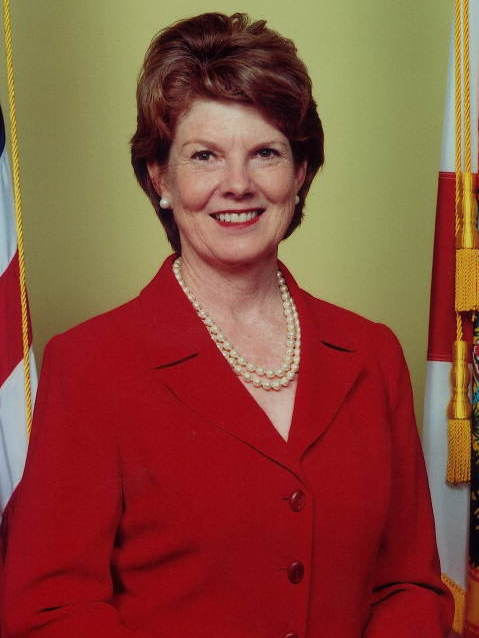

Candidate	Glenda Hood	Steve Villard
Party	Nonpartisan	Nonpartisan
Popular vote	7,492	1,448
Percentage	82.58%	15.96%
Mayor before election
Glenda Hood
Nonpartisan
Elected mayor
Glenda Hood
Nonpartisan

The 1996 Orlando mayoral election took place on April 16, 1996. In 1993, Orange County Supervisor of Elections Betty Carter banned municipalities from holding their elections on the same day as statewide primary and general elections, citing financial and logistical costs. Accordingly, this was the first Orlando mayoral election to be held in April.

Incumbent Mayor Glenda Hood ran for re-election to a second term. She was challenged by auto repairman Steve Villard, and entertainer Bonita Banana ran as a write-in candidate. The Orlando Sentinel endorsed Hood for re-election as "a strong formidable leader, creating programs to help both neighborhoods and businesses flourish." Hood won re-election in a landslide, receiving 83 perfect of the vote to Villard's 16 percent. Turnout significantly decreased following the shift to an April election, with fewer than 13 percent of voters casting ballots.

== General election ==
=== Candidates ===
- Glenda Hood, incumbent Mayor
- Steve Villard, auto repairman
- Bonita Conchita Martita Havana Banana-Pulovsky, entertainer and impersonator (write-in)

=== Results ===
1996 mayoral election results
Party	Candidate	Votes	%
Nonpartisan	Glenda Hood (inc.)	7,492	82.58%
Nonpartisan	Steve Villard	1,448	15.96%
Nonpartisan	Bonita Conchita Martita Havana Banana-Pulovsky (write-in)	132	1.46%
Total votes		9,072	100.00%
