= Connie Kunkle =

American television personality and singer (1958-2016)

- Born: April 4, 1958; Indiana, Pennsylvania, U.S.
- Died: December 14, 2016 (aged 58); College Station, Texas, U.S.
- Occupation: Television presenter • Singer

Connie Leigh Kunkle (April 4, 1958 – December 14, 2016) was an American television personality and singer who was best known as a host on the shopping network ShopHQ (formerly ShopNBC and Evine Live).

== Early life ==
Connie grew up in Indiana, Pennsylvania, to parents Ruth Miller Kunkle and Thomas L. Kunkle. She started developing her musical talent in public schools and performed in the school musicals, choirs, and orchestra. After graduating from Ohio University with a BS in communications, Kunkle's first job was at Walt Disney World as one of the Kids of the Kingdom. A few years later she became an original cast member for Top of the World, also at Disney World.

== Career ==
Kunkle went on to have an extensive career on stage and television. Her career spanned 40 years, including touring with the original cast of Andrew Lloyd Webber’s The Music of Andrew Lloyd Webber, starring opposite Tim Curry in Me and My Girl, starring opposite Donny Osmond in Joseph and the Amazing Technicolor Dreamcoat, and starring as Fantine in Les Misérables. Her concerts include many performances with the Orlando Philharmonic Orchestra and the Queen’s Royal Marine Band in England. In addition to many television hosting opportunities, which included hosting infomercials, she spent the past 11 years as an on-air host for ShopNBC/Evine Live where she started to work there in 2004. In December 2010, Kunkle released her own Christmas album titled Connie Kunkle Christmas.

== Personal life ==
Kunkle had three sisters, Judy Kunkle King Skelton of College Station, Texas; Patti Kunkle of Atlanta, Georgia; and Debbie Kunkle-Bramblett of Huntsville, Alabama. She also had nieces and nephews as well as a “chosen family” made up of a number of close friends.

=== Death ===
In 2015, Kunkle was diagnosed with frontotemporal dementia. In the last few months of her life, she transitioned to a memory care facility in College Station where she received care from her family. Kunkle died in her sleep on December 14, 2016, due to complications from the disease. She was 58 years old.

== Discography ==
- Connie Kunkle Christmas (December 1, 2010)
