= 2004 Orlando mayoral election =

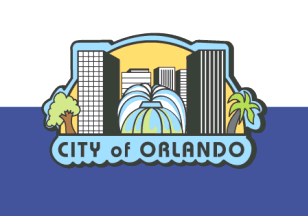
- March 9, 2004
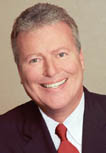

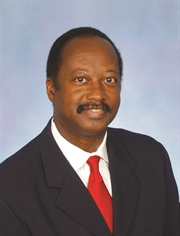
Candidate	Buddy Dyer	Ken Mulvaney	Sam Ings
Party	Nonpartisan	Nonpartisan	Nonpartisan
Popular vote	12,422	7,444	3,237
Percentage	50.96%	30.54%	13.28%
Mayor before election
Buddy Dyer
Nonpartisan
Elected mayor
Buddy Dyer
Nonpartisan

The 2004 Orlando mayoral election took place on March 9, 2004. Incumbent Mayor Buddy Dyer, who was first elected in a 2003 special election, ran for re-election to a full term. He faced four opponents, including businessman Ken Mulvaney and retired police captain Sam Ings. Dyer narrowly avoided a runoff election and won a full term, receiving 51 percent of the vote to Mulvaney's 31 percent and Ings's 13 percent.

Mulvaney contested the election results, alleging that Dyer illegally paid a consultant $10,000 to collect absentee ballots from predominantly Black precincts. On March 10, 2005, Dyer was indicted by a grand jury for violating state election law, which prompted Governor Jeb Bush to suspend him from office and schedule a special election. On April 20, 2005, the charges were dropped against Dyer, he was returned to office, and the special election was cancelled.

== General election ==
=== Candidates ===
- Buddy Dyer, incumbent Mayor
- Ken Mulvaney, businessman
- Sam Ings, retired Orlando Police Department captain
- Sharon Leichering, former city employee, 2003 candidate for Mayor
- Alex Lamour, perennial candidate

=== Polling ===
Poll source	Date(s) administered	Sample size (Note: Key: A – all adults RV – registered voters LV – likely voters V – unclear)	Margin of error	Buddy Dyer	Ken Mulvaney	Alex Lamour	Sam Ings	Sharon Leichering	Undecided
Mason-Dixon Polling & Strategy	March 1–3, 2004	625 (RV)	± 4.0%	47%	23%	3%	2%	2%	23%

=== Results ===
2004 Orlando mayoral election results
Party	Candidate	Votes	%
Nonpartisan	Buddy Dyer	12,422	50.96%
Nonpartisan	Ken Mulvaney	7,444	30.54%
Nonpartisan	Sam Ings	3,237	13.28%
Nonpartisan	Sharon Leichering	663	2.72%
Nonpartisan	Alex Lamour	609	2.50%
Total votes		24,375	100.00%
