= Buddy Dyer =

American politician (born 1958)

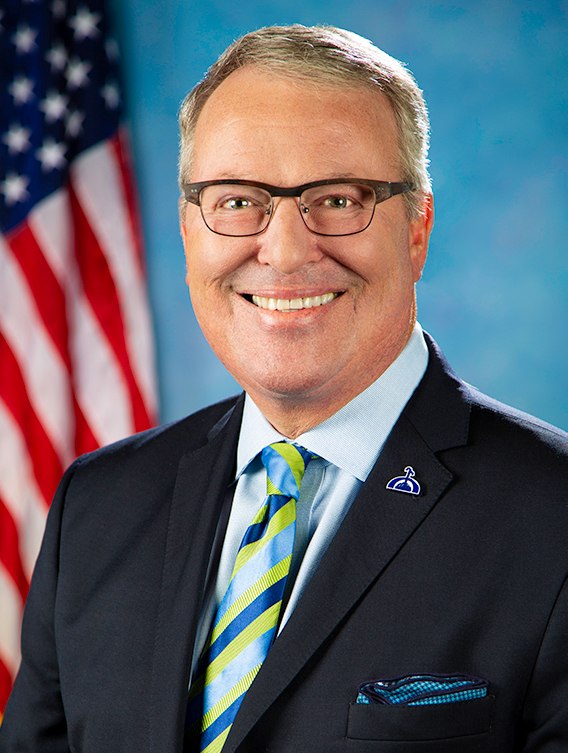
- Official portrait, 2018

48th Mayor of Orlando
- Incumbent
- Assumed office March 1, 2003
- Preceded by: Glenda Hood

Minority Leader of the Florida Senate
- In office November 17, 1998 – November 21, 2000
- Preceded by: Ken Jenne
- Succeeded by: Tom Rossin

Member of the Florida Senate from the 14th district
- In office November 17, 1992 – November 19, 2002
- Preceded by: Rich Crotty
- Succeeded by: Rod Smith

Personal details
- Born: John Hugh Dyer; August 7, 1958 (age 67) Orlando, Florida, U.S.
- Party: Democratic
- Spouses: Karen Caudill (m. 1989; div. 2017) Susie Pinson Galloway Shields (m. 2021)
- Children: 2
- Education: Brown University (BA); University of Florida (JD)

John Hugh "Buddy" Dyer (born August 7, 1958) is an American politician who has served as the Mayor of Orlando since 2003. A member of the Florida Democratic Party, he is Orlando's longest-serving mayor. He previously served as a representative for Orlando in the Florida State Senate from 1992 to 2002, with the last two years serving as the Senate Democratic leader.

== Early life and education ==
Dyer was born in 1958 in Orlando. He grew up in nearby Kissimmee, graduating from Osceola High School. He began his political career after serving as an attorney and lawyer following his graduations from Brown University and the University of Florida College of Law.

== Florida Senate (1992–2002) ==
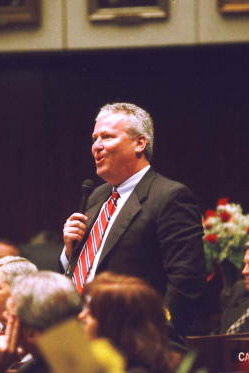
Dyer speaking in 2000

Dyer's first run for political office was for Kissimmee City Council, which he lost. In 1992 for Florida's State Senate district 14, which consisted of Orlando and Sanford, Florida. Dyer had two Democratic primary opponents, Candice "Candy" Crawford (sister of former Florida Agriculture Commissioner Bob Crawford and political pundit Craig Crawford) and Tim Adams, a local business owner. Dyer won the primary, but failed to get the 50% needed to avoid a runoff. Dyer received 44% of the vote, while Crawford received 39%. Adams received 17% and was eliminated. The runoff between Dyer and Crawford was concentrated in Orlando's African-American communities. Dyer received the support of many of the local churches as well as the endorsement of Tim Adams and Dotti Wynn (loser of the district's Republican primary), while Crawford relied on State Representative Alzo Reddick. Dyer won the runoff 54% to 44%. He continued to the general election, where he faced Republican Steve DeMino, which he won with 56% of the vote.

He was re-elected in 1996 and 2000, serving ten years in the State Senate, where he was State Senate Democratic leader for three years. In 2002 he ran for the office of state attorney general, losing to then-Republican (later Democrat) Charlie Crist.

== Mayor of Orlando (2003–present) ==
=== Elections ===
Dyer was elected the 32nd mayor of Orlando on February 25, 2003, in a special election after the previous mayor, Glenda Hood, was appointed Florida's Secretary of State. He was re-elected in 2004 in a regular election, narrowly avoiding a runoff with challenger Ken Mulvaney. He won re-election again on January 29, 2008, receiving 61% of the vote over challenger Mulvaney. Buddy Dyer was once again re-elected mayor in November 2015 with 62.5% of the vote for his fourth full term in office. The 2023 Orlando mayoral election was held on Tuesday, November 7, 2023, to elect the mayor of Orlando, Florida. Incumbent Buddy Dyer successfully ran for a sixth term, which he has said will be his last. Dyer said, "I tell people that this is the last one so that people that have either been waiting or thinking about running for mayor have that opportunity if that's something they want to do in four years. This is the last four years."

==== Actions in office ====
In his years as mayor of Orlando, Buddy Dyer claims progress in realizing his vision for Orlando as a "world-class city." According to his re-election campaign materials, he led Orlando out of a financial crisis and made public safety a top priority. He attracted state-of-the-art health care facilities and created a regional medical area at Lake Nona, and has worked to improve all of the city's neighborhoods. During his term, Orlando has had three consecutive years of employment growth and a 2.2 percent decline in unemployment.

Dyer advocated a new performing arts center for Orlando and a new arena for the Orlando Magic. He worked with then-Orange County Mayor Rich Crotty to get approval for using US$1.1 billion of the county's Tourist Development Tax money, collected as a surcharge on hotel rooms, to fund construction of a new arena, a new performing arts center and large-scale renovations of the Citrus Bowl. The measure received final approvals on both the city and county levels in August 2007. Later that month, local hotelier Harris Rosen launched a drive to get initiatives on the ballot to allow citizens to vote on whether they wanted public money spent on these projects.

Mayor Dyer has attracted criticism from homeless advocates due to his support for an Orlando ordinance (passed in July 2006) that requires permits for "large group feedings" in downtown parks. The Orlando group of Food Not Bombs sued Dyer and the City of Orlando over the ordinance in federal court. The court ruled in September 2008 that the ordinance was unconstitutional because it violated the group's First Amendment rights. The city has appealed this ruling to the U.S. Circuit Court of Appeals. Many critics of Dyer's support of the ban on "large group feedings" claim Dyer backs the ban to appease the wealthy residents of the Lake Eola neighborhood.

He is a member of the Mayors Against Illegal Guns Coalition.

Dyer was one of nine mayors who established July 15 as Social Media Giving Day in 2013, encouraging citizens to support charities via social media.

In 2017, he declared July 5 as Impact Wrestling Day in the city of Orlando after joining Orlando nightclub shooting survivor Tony Marrero at an Impact event.

==== Suspension and reinstatement ====
Following the 2004 election, Mulvaney alleged election fraud by Dyer. An investigation into the matter by the Florida Department of Law Enforcement led a grand jury to bring charges against the mayor, his campaign manager, and an election consultant for allegedly paying someone to gather absentee ballots in Orlando's African American community. Such payments are illegal under Florida law. In March 2005, Dyer was suspended by Governor Jeb Bush in accordance with the Florida Constitution. In April 2005, the charges were dismissed and he was reinstated as mayor.

== Personal life ==
Dyer married Karen Caudill in 1989. Together they have two sons. Dyer filed for divorce from his wife on September 1, 2017; the divorce document stated the marriage was "irretrievably broken".

Dyer married his second wife, Susie Pinson Galloway Shields, in 2021. They had been dating for some time and were a couple during his 2019 campaign.

== Distinctions ==
The Orlando Sentinel named Dyer "The most powerful person in Central Florida" for 2008.

Florida Senate
Preceded by Rich Crotty	Member of the Florida Senate from the 14th district November 17, 1992–November 19, 2002	Succeeded by Rod Smith
Preceded by Ken Jenne	Minority Leader of the Florida Senate; November 17, 1998–November 21, 2000	Succeeded by Tom Rossin
Party political offices
Preceded by Bob Butterworth	Democratic nominee for Attorney General of Florida; 2002	Succeeded by Skip Campbell
Political offices
Preceded by Glenda Hood	Mayor of Orlando; March 1, 2003–present	Incumbent
