= Beacham Theatre =

Movie theater in Orlando, Florida

Coordinates: 28.543°N 81.379472°W

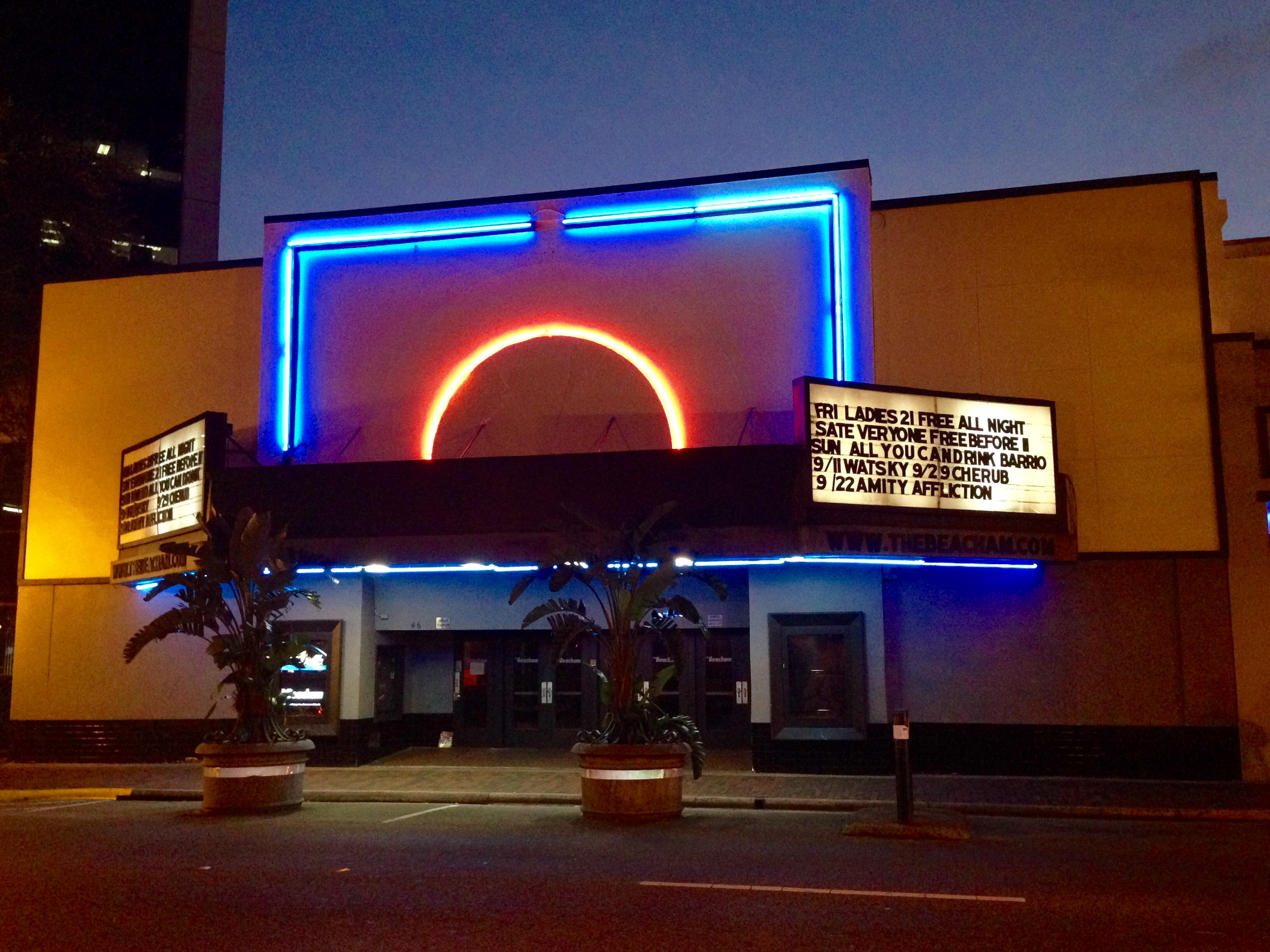
- Exterior of venue (c.2016)
- Former names: Beacham Theatre (1921–1976; 2011–present) Great Southern Music Hall (1976–81); Laser World (1981–82); Moulin Orange (1983–84); Celebrity Dinner Theater (1984–87); Aahz (1988–92); Dekko's (1992–94); Zuma Beach Club (1994–2000) Tabu (2001–10)

General information
- Type: Theater
- Architectural style: Commercial, Art Deco and Mediterranean Revival
- Location: 46 N Orange Ave; Orlando, FL 32801-2419
- Completed: December 9, 1921
- Renovated: 1936, 1953, 1976, 1981, 1984, 1988, 1992, 2000
- Client: Braxton Beacham Sr.
- Owner: Beacham Theatre, LLC. (Missy Casscells and Frank Hamby)

Dimensions
- Other dimensions: 145 feet (44 m) across x 213.5 feet (65.1 m) deep

Technical details
- Structural system: Reinforced concrete and brick with stucco out-surface
- Floor area: 30,965 square foot (2,876.7 m^{2})

Other information
- Seating capacity: 1,250

Website
- Venue Website

The Beacham Theatre is a cinema built in 1921 by Braxton Beacham Sr. in the city of Orlando, Florida. The current address of the theater is 46 North Orange Avenue, and it is located at the southwest corner of Orange Avenue and Washington Street. The building's current lack of impressive architecture is offset by its significant cultural history. The Beacham Theatre was considered an important contributing structure when the Downtown Orlando historic district was created in 1980 and the building was granted local landmark status in 1987.

The Beacham was once part of the vaudeville circuit and hosted celebrity acts such as John Philip Sousa, the Ziegfeld Follies and W.C. Fields, whose signature was once visible inside a dressing room. In the eras of silent film and Classical Hollywood cinema, the Beacham was operated as a movie theater that used then-current state-of-the-art motion picture technology.

The Beacham, as it is currently named, has since been used as a series of concert venues and nightclubs thus saving it from demolition. The Beacham Theatre was once home to the internationally recognized late-night underground discotheque Aahz, a notable early component of the US electronic dance music movement in the early 1990s.

== History ==
=== Construction ===
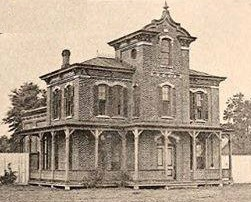
The former Orange County Jail on the site of the Beacham Theatre

The Beacham Theatre was constructed in 1921 by Braxton Beacham Sr., who had previously owned three other Orlando theaters and had served as Mayor of Orlando during 1907. In 1917 Beacham paid approximately $17,500–$20,000 for the property one block southwest of his stately residence on Jefferson Street after Orlando's citizens voted to pave the road to the cemetery instead of purchasing the old jail. The property he purchased had formerly served as the jail for Orange County since about 1873. With a $200,000 investment, the former jail building was torn down in 1919 and Beacham developed a series of connected building units along the west side of Orange Avenue between Washington Street and Oak Street (now Wall Street). The new building was then known as "Beacham's Block" and is now known as the Beacham Building. The location of Beacham's theater was precisely where several condemned prisoners were executed by hanging. According to local folklore, the Beacham Building is reportedly haunted.

The Beacham Theatre was constructed to have excellent acoustics. The Beacham's auditorium features "square columns adorned with feathered capitals that climb gracefully to a high ceiling decorated with rectangles of intricate plasterwork." When constructed, the theater was outfitted with draperies that covered the plaster walls. The draperies had "mild tan figures delicately woven into the broad white field with an occasional soft blue figure" that were selected by Mrs. Roberta Holland Beacham, wife of Braxton Beacham Sr.

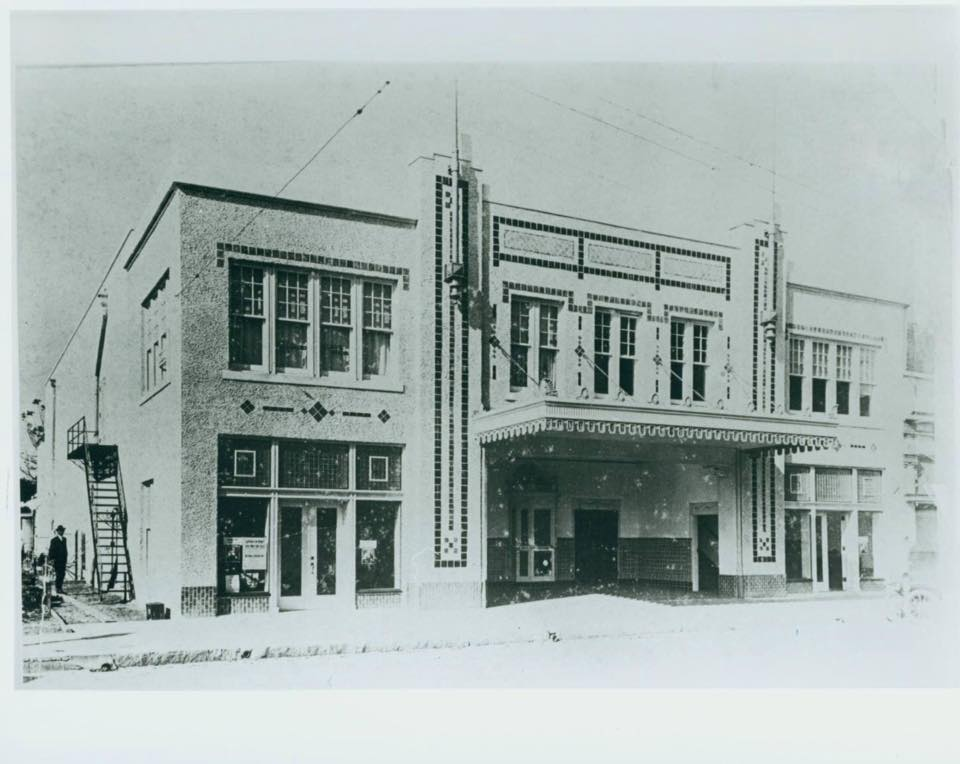
The Beacham Theatre shortly after construction in 1921

Beacham outfitted his theater with innovative state-of-the art equipment from the Southern Theater Equipment Company of Atlanta. The Beacham's box office in the lobby featured both an automatic admission ticket vending machine dispenser and ticket chopping machine. A decorative marquee that was unique in Florida extended toward the street and featured an electric changeable sign that flashed the daily program. Two Powers 6B type "E" projectors were supplied by the N Power company of New York. The Midas Gold film screen was made especially for the Beacham. A medium-sized pipe organ from the Austin Organ Company of Hartford, Connecticut, was purchased and installed at a cost of $15,000. The organ, Opus 1034 with 3 manuals in a center console, 24 ranks of pipes and 24 stops was played by both Mr. Herman Stuart and Mrs. Roberta Branch Beacham, wife of Braxton Beacham Jr. to accompany silent films and vaudeville acts. Typhoon cooling and ventilating equipment was installed in the theater. The Beacham Building's construction featured numerous fireproofing and fire safety measures. When the theater opened, the auditorium had an operating capacity of 1400.

Tunnels from the theater stage trap ran into the basements of two nearby hotels. The tunnels had low ceilings and were sealed during new construction in the early 1980s. The tunnels extended south into the San Juan Hotel, where Mr. Beacham happened to have had an office, and then east under Orange Avenue into the Angebilt Hotel. Historians reason that the purpose of the tunnels may have been either for vaudeville performers to enter the theater from their hotels without being mobbed by crowds, or the tunnels could have been used for the storage and transportation of alcoholic beverages during prohibition as has been discovered at some of the other theaters in the Central Florida area.

=== Vaudeville and silent film era ===
On December 9, 1921, Orlando's premier vaudeville and movie house opened by showing The Wonderful Thing, starring Norma Talmadge, a Pathé News newsreel, and Buster Keaton's The Boat. The Beacham Theatre was originally the only independent theater in Orlando. However, the next year, in 1922, Beacham leased his theater to Mack Sparks of the Sparks Theater Company chain.

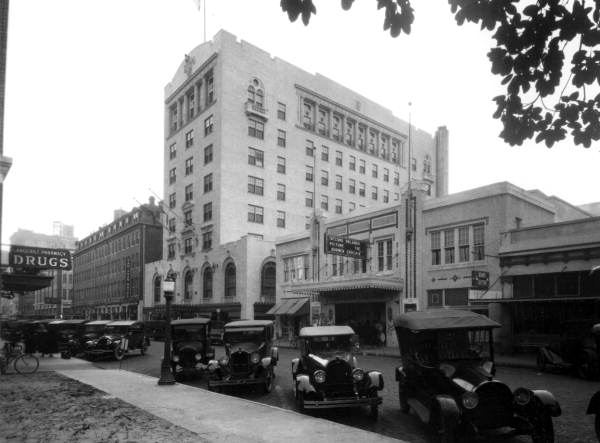
Beacham Theatre and San Juan Hotel circa 1923. Marquee: The Second Orlando Picture The Burned Crucifix

The senior Braxton Beacham died in 1924 after a long illness, and Roberta Holland Beacham died soon after in 1926. Their estate and real property were left to their children, Norma K. Hughes, Roberta Augusta Rogers, Braxton Beacham Jr., and his wife Roberta Branch Beacham.

Florida and Orlando were on what was referred to by vaudeville performers as "The Straw Hat Circuit." The Beacham Theatre was included on the Alexander Pantages, Orpheum, and Keith-Albee vaudeville performance circuits (later combined as the Keith-Albee-Orpheum circuit).

Manager Harry Vincent started several promotions at the Beacham Theatre in the summer months of the mid-1920s that included Bank Night, Amateur Night, and Country Store Night, which was supported by dozens of local merchants. An advertisement for the Beacham in 1925 says, "Don't talk about the hot weather. Beat the heat in a Beacham seat. 'Kum Keep Kumfy Kool at the Beacham' is known to many and you won't enjoy yourself until you too get into the line that leads to comfort."

Frank Bell served as manager of the theater with organist Herman Siewart and Ken Guernsey leading the community sing-along at open forum meetings that were held for several months during the winter on Sunday afternoons.

The Beacham's "exploitation director" Frank H. Burns often designed and created large elaborate standing displays that decorated the facade and lobby of the theater to advertise new film features. The iconic displays that Burns created for the Beacham Theatre were sometimes complete with coordinated costumes for the employees.

In 1928 Vitaphone and Movietone "talkie" equipment debuted during the city's first "Progress Week" during the last week of August. "The queen of the vamps," actress Theda Bara, was in appearance at the Beacham as students from Orlando High School sneaked into the balcony via the fire escape. Sound was provided by two gramophone discs that accompanied each film. Both phonographs were played simultaneously in case the needle skipped during a film. Output could be easily switched so that the film's sound could remain in synchronicity with the picture. William Booth succeeded Frank Bell as manager of the Beacham after Bell was transferred in 1928.

The city's "Sunday closing law" was repealed by voters in 1929 by a majority of only 59 votes. Movie theaters and other businesses in Orlando were then permitted to operate seven days a week. All of Orlando's theaters, including the Beacham, celebrated by showing free films until late into the night.

==== End of the vaudeville and silent film era ====
Interest in silent films began to diminish in 1929 and they were gradually phased out and moved into obsolescence. On Thursday evenings at the Beacham for the Bank Night promotion, $200 was raffled with prizes of $50. On Saturday, December 24, 1931, and on Wednesday, September 28, 1932, a brand new $325 Austin 7 Sport Roadster was given away. Vaudeville acts continued touring at the Beacham for several more years until approximately 1933. Homer Fuller served as manager of the Beacham during the end of the eras of silent films and vaudeville.

In 1933 following a bitter lawsuit against Orlando Enterprises over nonpayment of the lease for the building that had been originally negotiated with the senior Braxton Beacham in 1924, the theater was closed for almost three weeks. $8000 in back taxes on Beacham's building was due. Beacham Jr. claimed the closure was deliberate and malicious and sued for $100,000. Two separate judgments were entered against Orlando Enterprises Inc. for $2291.67 each and a payment agreement was reached. Litigation was then withdrawn.

As a result of the suit the lease was not renewed and Beacham's theater again became Orlando's only independent cinema. In the same year, the theater was soon leased Florida State Theaters. Harry Vincent was named manager of the reopened theater in 1933; however, soon after, Vernon D. Hunter became the theater's manager and remained in that role for the next two decades.

=== First-run movie era ===
In August 1937 the Orlando Police Department raided the Beacham Theatre. All of the equipment for the Bank Night marketing promotion was seized after authorities declared it to be a lottery.

The Yearling was filmed locally in 1946 and the Beacham's projectionist Byram McGee served as an electrician and steward on the film production. Mcgee's wife Lois acted in the role of Ma Forrester and was also the production's wardrobe supervisor. Numerous other local technicians were involved with making the film.

The Orlando Story, filmed by Don Parrisher Motion Picture Productions of New York, contained images of daily life in Orlando. The movie was heavily promoted locally and was shown at the Beacham over three days in August 1949.

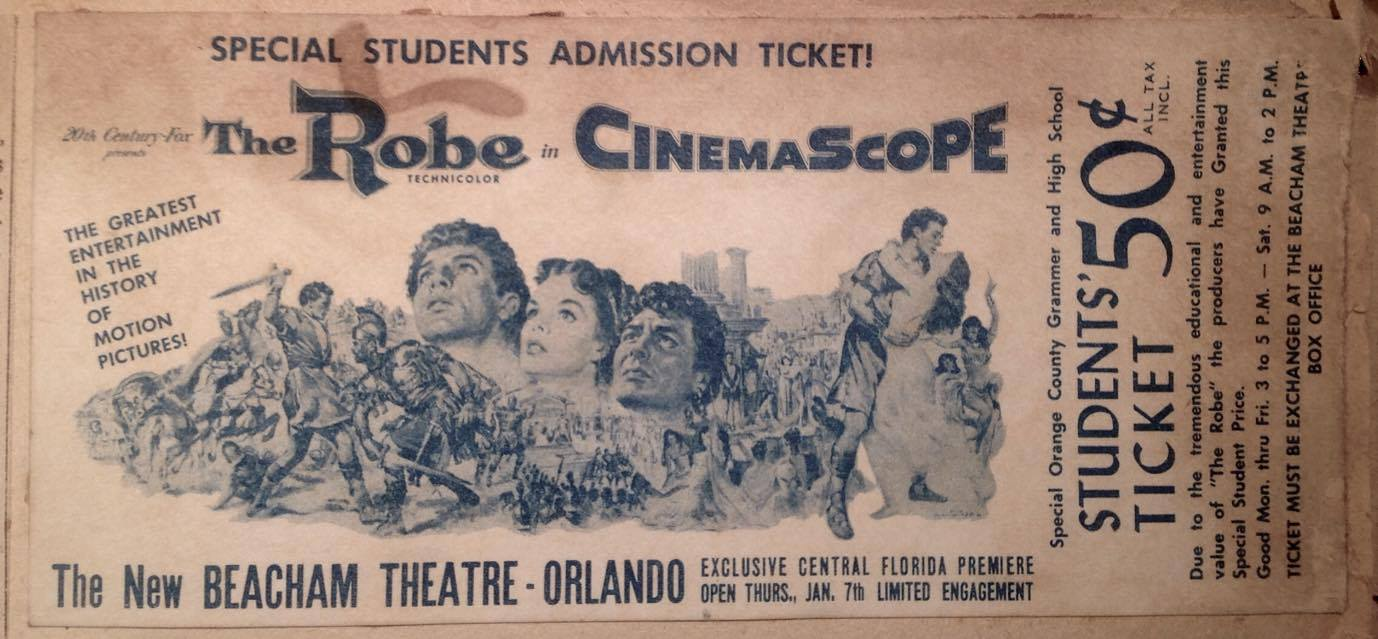
Student ticket for The Robe and the debut of CinemaScope at the Beacham Theatre

In December 1949 The Tom Thumb Follies staged radio broadcast performances at the Beacham. When a Santa Claus from the Elks Lodge lifted one young elf into the audience for the last verse, the smell of bourbon whiskey caused her to ponder, "I wasn't just sure where the night's polka would land us. Maybe Oz?"

After an extensive remodel, CinemaScope equipment was introduced at the "New" Beacham Theatre in 1954 with the addition of stereophonic sound, new projection lenses, and a wider screen. CinemaScope had its debut at the Beacham on January 7, 1954, for a two-week showing of the film The Robe. Vernon D. Hunter retired after 20 years as manager of the Beacham Theater. Walter Colby became the executive director of several Orlando theaters including the Beacham.

Braxton Beacham Jr., died in 1961.

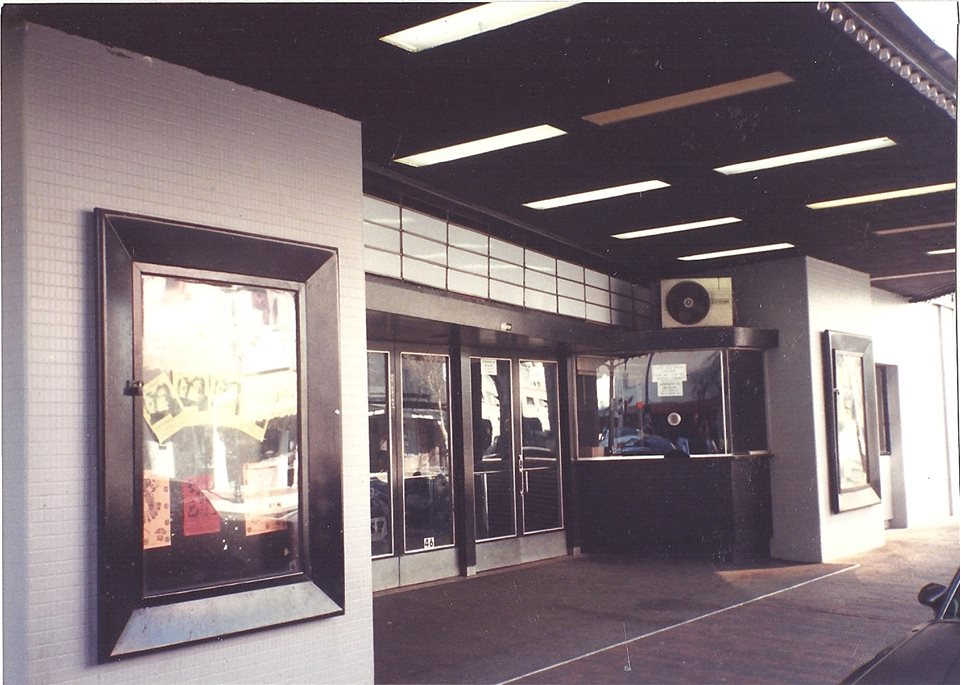
The box office of the Beacham Theatre in March 1991. The 1954 box office was removed in 2000.

During the Civil Rights Movement, the Beacham Theatre had frequent stand-in protests by African American citizens of relegation to lesser "colored theaters" mandated by Jim Crow laws such as the Florida Constitution of 1885. Reverend Nelson Pinder, of Parramore's Episcopal Church of St. John the Baptist, along with other community leaders such as NAACP Youth Council advisor, Rev. Curtis Jackson, worked with white officials for peaceful integration in Orlando to avoid incidents of racial violence that were occurring in other Florida cities. Rev. Pinder organized the church's Liberal Religious Youth group. Rev. Pinder's youth group protests were often joined by local members of the Youth Council of the National Association for the Advancement of Colored People. Each night, activist members of the youth groups quietly stood-in near the Beacham's ticket booth until the theater stopped selling tickets. On May 24, 1962, white supremacists were also picketing the Beacham at the same time as the Liberal Religious Youth group. Orlando police arrested eight teen protestors. The teens were kept in so-called protective custody and were later released to their parents. Following agreements with a biracial committee from Orlando Mayor Bob Carr's office, of which Rev. Pinder was a member, the Beacham Theatre quietly began allowing a limited number of African-American patrons into the balcony for designated showings in 1963. The theater remained racially segregated for African-American patrons until 1965.

In 1964 the theater was temporarily closed down while Cinerama equipment was installed. A super-wide anamorphic movie screen was added to the auditorium and the stereophonic sound system was upgraded. Two Norelco Universal 70/35mm Motion Picture Projectors and a small restroom for the projectionist were installed in a newly built downstairs projection booth under the balcony that required the removal of two aisles and several seats. Following the Beacham's upgrade to 70 mm film technology, The Sound of Music had a continuous 14-month run between 1965 and 1966.

Orlando's Chamber of Commerce held open forum meetings at the Beacham Theatre on Sundays during the winter months of 1971–1973 under the direction of W. F. Blackman.

==== End of the first-run movie era ====
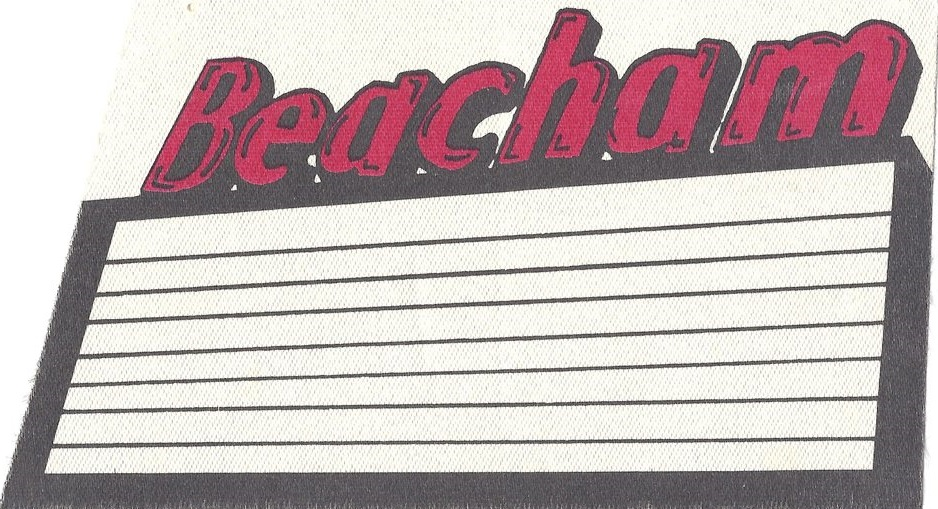
1990s logo depicting the Beacham Theatre's mid-century marquee.

During the 1970s Orlando, like many U.S. cites, was experiencing symptoms of urban decay. The rush from the city to the suburbs affected nearly all of the city's businesses. As an effect of the exodus, each of Downtown Orlando's movie theaters closed. Dick Gabel and John Prine were serving as projectionists at several of the theaters. Following a decline in attendance, by 1974 the Beacham Theatre and Florida State Theaters in general were primarily showing exploitation films and B-movie action films. The next year, H. A. Tedder, who was the Orlando executive manager at long-time lessee Florida State Theaters, made the decision that The Beacham Theatre would cease operating as a first-run movie cinema. After showing a Sunday double-feature of Return of the Street Fighter, and The Scavengers, the Beacham Theatre's manager, McKinley Howard, closed the theater's doors as a first-run film cinema for the last time on September 28, 1975. Florida State Theaters remained responsible for paying the monthly lease of $2700 until the theater was sold.

=== Live entertainment era ===
In 1975 Larry and Sherry Carpenter purchased the Beacham Building from then-owners, Betty Rubles Bray, and Burkett H. Bray Jr. A great-granddaughter of Braxton Beacham, Mrs. Bray, refused to sell the theater by itself without also selling the rest of the building as a package. An extensive $250,000 remodeling and restoration followed that included multi-colored Art Deco revival style graphics painted over the facade and a large multi-story mural of a saxophone and its open case painted on the rear of the theater that faced west and was clearly visible from nearby Interstate 4. Following the restoration the Carpenters opened Orlando's franchise location of The Great Southern Music Hall at the Beacham in 1976. The 700-seat Great Southern Music Hall was a concert venue that hosted approximately 180 prominent national and regional acts at the Beacham. The Great Southern Music Hall was occasionally still used as a movie theater that presented world cinema and classic Hollywood films by film directors such as John Carpenter, Federico Fellini, and Mel Brooks during the week. John Lawson was the acting projectionist and served as stage director for concerts. As The Great Southern Music Hall, only about seven music shows were unprofitable. Nevertheless, Orlando's Great Southern Music Hall closed in 1981 due to the rising costs of hosting concerts for notable musical acts and competition from larger venues.

Roberta Branch Beacham died in 1980.

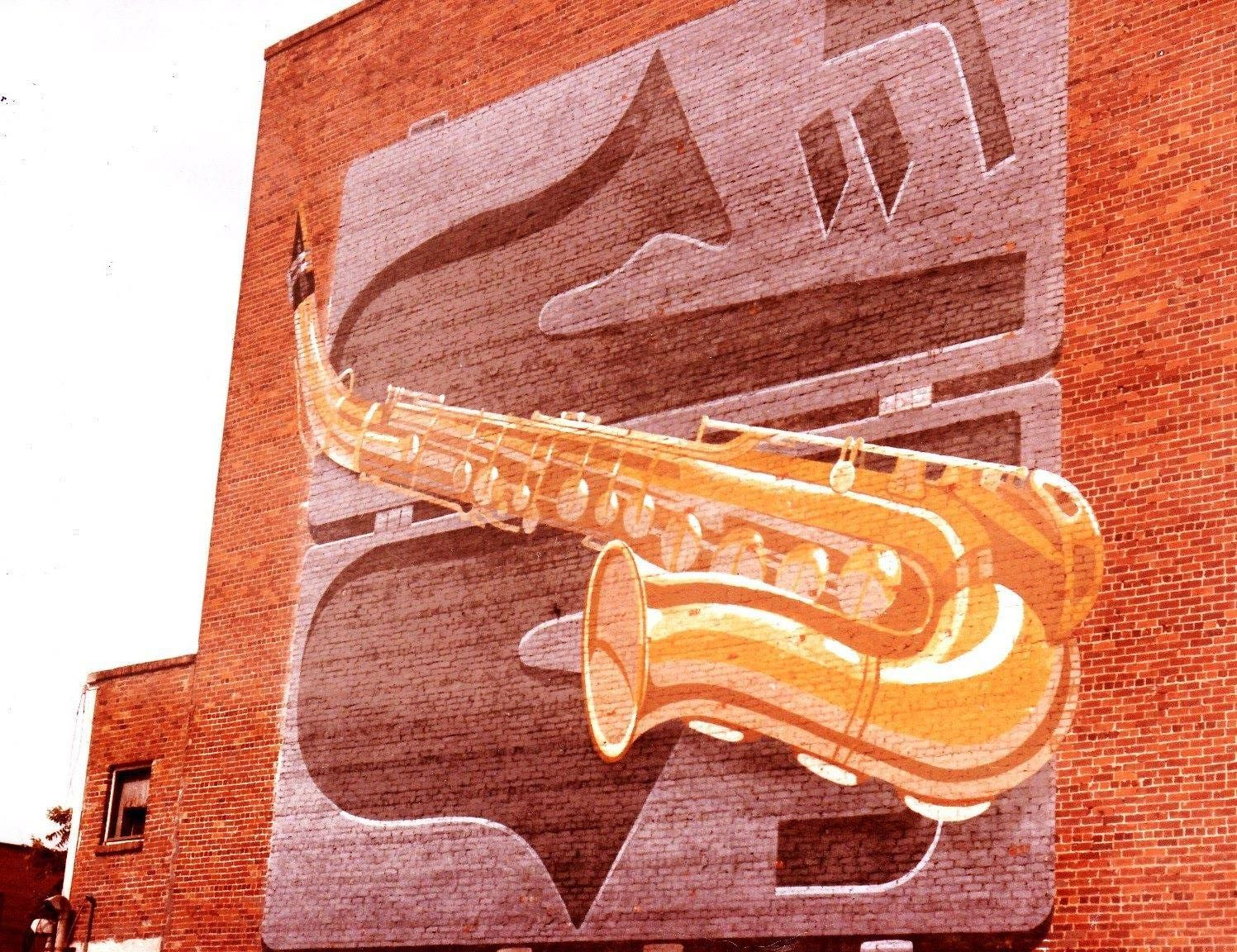
Mural on Beacham Theater in 1983

In 1981 Sherry Carpenter, then sole owner, leased the theater to Jeff Roberts. Roberts opened Laser World, a futuristic one- and one-half-hour laser light show that featured lasers, sound, ballet, costumed modern dance routines and magic illusion, as well as outer space photographs that were projected onto a large viewing screen from behind. Laser World closed in 1982. Other short-lasting entities followed.

The Orlando Sentinel critic Howard Means, reminded readers, that the 1965 installation of "then-new Cinerama equipment at the Beacham was the latest testimony to the faith in the future of Downtown Orlando" and that, "The Beacham had long been seen as a bellwether of the health of the center city." Upon further reflection, he lamented, "that the Beacham is simply a microcosm of modern downtown realities." Means editorialized, by 1982 "The present state of the Beacham was the latest testament to decay," and, "In the way of dying enterprises, the Beacham's reincarnations became increasingly more short-lived."

In February 1983 Oscar F. Juarez, an Orlando property developer and Republican Party strategist, purchased the building for $1.5 million. Soon after the purchase, a plan was announced to lease it to open a bar and French restaurant "with a Georgetown flair" that later became Valentyne's Restaurant as well as a new nightclub inside the theater.

A vision for the theater announced in 1983 was for a New York-style nightclub dubbed Studio 46 that emulated the spirit of Studio 54. Studio 46 did not come to fruition but the primordial description of Orlando's very own "Studio 54" at the Beacham Theater was soon realized a few years later.

The theater was next leased by Ellen Hunt, of Orlando, and Roger Lopez, of France in August 1983. Hunt and Lopez opened a cabaret club in the theater named Moulin Orange that featured Las Vegas-style showgirls. Moulin Orange was only open for several months during 1983 and 1984.

In December 1984 with the hope of operating an expansion to his dinner theater franchise, a five-year lease of the theater was granted to Theatre Management Corporation of Orlando consisting of actor Tom McKinney and Rick Allen, a producer of the Reynolds Theater. The Beacham served as a Celebrity Dinner Theater franchise location in conjunction with Valentyne's restaurant that was next door from 1985 until 1986. Under new management, Valentyne's Celebrity Dinner Theater briefly reopened in 1986 before the dinner theater venture at the Beacham finally ended entirely early in 1987.

The Beacham Theatre was granted local historic landmark status on September 21, 1987, for its historical significance to the community. Between each new identity for the theater and the occasional concert, the Beacham Theatre sat unoccupied and empty.

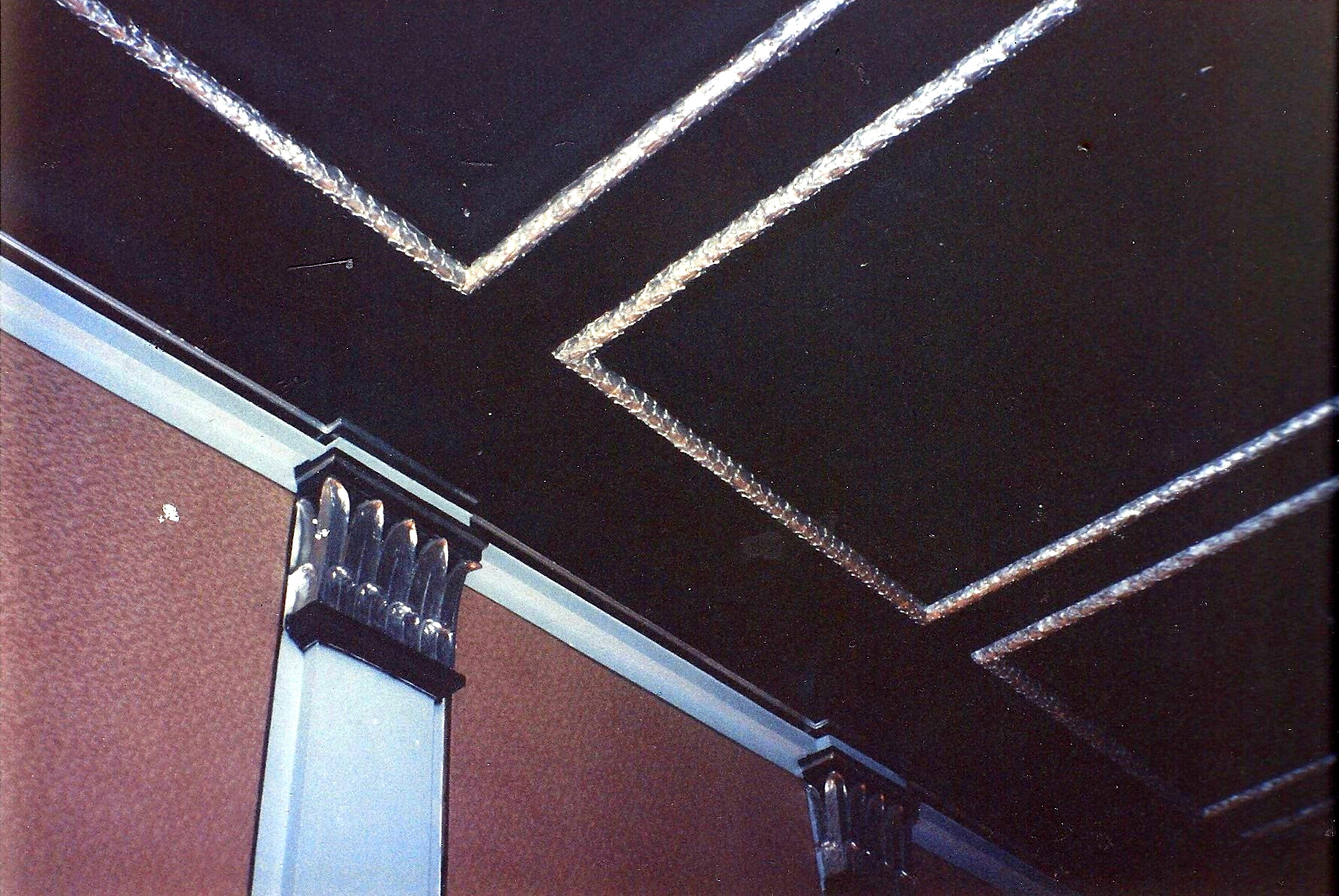
"Square columns and feathered capitals climb gracefully to intricate plasterwork" in 1991

Despite the new recognition for the theater by the City of Orlando, Mr. Juarez saw the building as a liability with many pleasant memories surrounding it, but with little economic potential. Citing maintaining the building and rehabilitation of the area, he first announced plans to raze the building for an unspecified mix-use purpose and later to redevelop the former Beacham Block with a new skyscraper that would be used as a combination office building and hotel. In 1988 Juarez received two successive approval Certificate of Appropriateness permits from the City of Orlando Board of Historic Preservation to demolish the Beacham Theatre within 180 days. The "Bye-bye Beacham Bash" was promptly organized by Orlando Remembered and attended by former theater doormen, ushers, candy girls, and cashiers on December 9, 1988. However, Mr. Juarez's redevelopment plan and the new construction of a 20-story office building and parking garage fell through at the last moment due to poor timing. Additional parking could have contributed to a revitalized downtown area, but the market for office space in Downtown Orlando was nearly saturated in the late 1980s and there was a general lack of interest from prospective future tenants. Had the project materialized, Mr. Juaraz would have been required to reconstruct a replica of the original Beacham Theatre facade using original building materials of brick, stucco, decorative tile, and pastel colors.

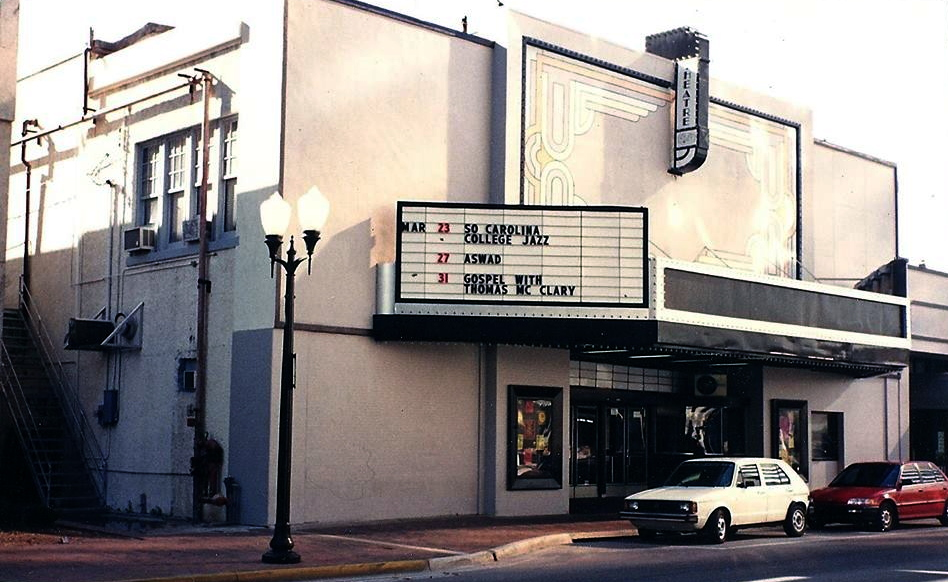
Beacham Theatre facade in March 1991

In 1987 Brad Belletto and then-wife Lisa moved to Orlando from Louisiana. Brad Belletto, then owned a theatrical equipment manufacturing company and had formerly owned Moon Sound, a New Orleans sound and lighting company. The Bellettos, intent on overhauling the music scene in Orlando, were looking for a new venue following operation of a successful club in Baton Rouge. They found the Beacham Theatre and immediately fell in love with it. At that time, the Beacham was being subleased to Clark J, a local record producer, and a brief partnership was formed.

Late in 1988 the lease for the Beacham's theater was secured by the Bellettos under Entertainment Investments International. Several of Lisa's cousins relocated to Orlando to help out with the task of preparing the Beacham for its opening and Brad's mother Bev tended the bar through the entire duration of the lease. The Bellettos also hosted an annual full-service Christmas dinner for hundreds of the city's homeless population at the Beacham Theatre with food donated by Orlando's high-end restaurants and businesses.

The Bellettos planned to use the Beacham Theatre for theatrical performances and concerts during the week and as a nightclub on the weekends. Frank Carroll, served as the managing artistic director for theatre productions and starred in a Las Vegas-style musical revue tribute to Liberace, Viva Liberace, Viva. A "Leonard Bernstein opera" and "an Edward Albee drama" were additional production features before theatrical productions ceased.

Concerts were coordinated by Mary Ann D'Arpino of Mary Ann Productions, who had an office at the Beacham; Island Productions; Harry Tiyler of Fat Harry Productions, and Cellar Door Productions. Several prominent musical act concerts of nearly every genre were staged during this time.

=== Night club era ===
Since 1988 the theater has been used as a series of combination nightclub and concert venue enterprises.

In May 1989 the Beacham Theatre was sold by Oscar Juarez for $1.8 million to a property management firm owned by Longwood businesswoman Missy Casscells and her husband Frank Hamby.

==== Late Night era: (1988–1994) Aahz ====
Brad and Lisa Belletto with other Beacham DJs scoured sources across the U.S. and Europe and traveled frequently for new and rare records. During the Second Summer of Love in the United Kingdom that began in 1988, on Friday and Saturday nights the Beacham Theater housed a discotheque that had a progressive dance music format with Lisa Belletto as resident DJ and lighting control operator and Brad Belletto as operating director. Initially the club was to be called "F/X (or Effects)" but it opened as "Pure NRG (or Energy)."

The late nights at the Beacham featured DJs, beat matching, rare and obscure dance music on vinyl records, intelligent lighting, and themed decor that at times included original paintings by local artist Rollo. The popularity of dancing throughout the night at the Beacham Theatre initially caught on slowly and many free passes were given out. Soon, the entry queue for "Late Night" snaked around the block. The transition from handyman special to underground hotspot was attributed to the Belleto's planning, dedication, and vision.

The conceptual themes for "Late Night" were frequently alternated (sometimes weekly) and occasionally repeated. The various themes subsequently included World War III, Aahz, Trancentral, The Haunted Theatre, Egypt, Alphabet City, Psychedelic Babylon, Unity, and Reunion. The all-night dance parties were eventually referred to using the umbrella term "'Late Night' at the Classic Beacham Theatre."

The Aahz nightclub concept was born after Lisa saw the name at a shop in Los Angeles. The Bellettos and Shayni Howen then created and developed the Aahz concept for the Beacham. Shayni and her team created Aahz's iconic décor which included a painted yellow brick road and a giant paper mache Wizard of Oz head behind the stage. At midnight each night, DJ Lisa typically played Rhythm Device's Acid Rock, at which point the stage's curtain was raised and the glowing eyes and smoking mouth of the Wizard were revealed.

Eventually the combined tasks of simultaneously playing all of the music and operating the lights became overwhelming for Lisa and as a result Shayni's sister, "Late night" veteran Stacey "StaceBass" Howen, was brought in to operate the computerized lighting control console and promote the nightclub. By the Summer of 1989, Lisa was expecting her first child and still resident DJ. Only two months before the birth of her son she invited Kimball Collins, who was the DJ in the Beacham Buildings northern unit, to replace her and hired him as Aahz's resident Late Night DJ. Joseph Jilbert (DJ Jo-Edd), Steve McClure (DJ Monk) and Paul Campbell (DJ Stylus) had brief stints as DJ at "Late Night" when they were hired to fill in for Lisa or Kimball Collins. Dave Cannalte was quickly brought in as "Late Night's" co-resident DJ.

At this point, Underground music such as Industrial dance music and Gothic rock was played during Orlando's normal bar operating hours from 10 p.m. until just after 2 am. Upon an announcement at around 2:30 a.m. (or an opening at 3 am.) that said simply, "Welcome to Late Night," mixed New Beat, Progressive dance, Balearic beat, and Acid house electronic dance music began that frequently lasted until 8 a.m. and occasionally lasted until as late as 11 am.

Local DJ's Jerry Johnson (the Reverend), Andy Hughes, Jay Skinner, Robby Clark, Troy Davis, Eddie Pappa (DJ Icey) and DJ Lisa Belletto were occasional guests for special events such as the "DJ Unity for the World" dance party in December 1991.

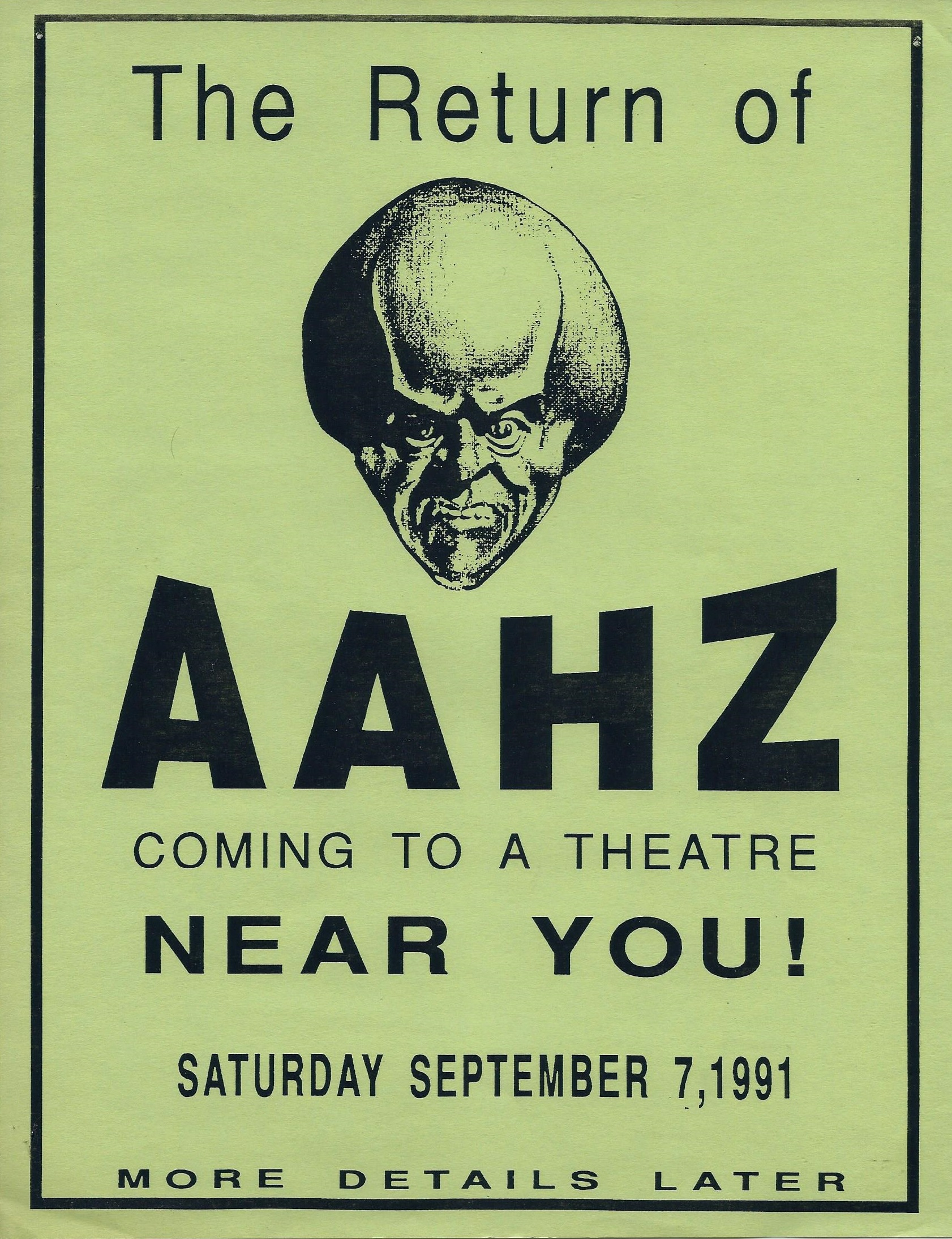
1991 Return of AAHZ flyer

Dave Cannalte and Kimball Collins, and Stace presided over and further developed an ever-growing local scene. Chris Fortier later joined the duo of Kimball and Dave Cannalte as an Aahz resident DJ. As it evolved, "Late Night" boosted the careers of numerous DJs and producers such as Andy Hughes, Jimmy Van M, AK1200, DJ Icey, DJ Baby Anne, Sean Cusick, and Cosmic Baby, as well as Dave Seaman, Sasha and John Digweed.

The use of psychedelic drugs such as ecstasy and LSD at the Beacham Theatre during the late 1980s and early 1990s was prevalent and eventually began to attract the attention of law enforcement agencies. After "warnings" about increased surveillance of the Beacham that allegedly came from the Drug Enforcement Administration, additional security, pat-downs, new restrictions on reentering, attire, and the behavior for patrons were implemented.

The final all-night Aahz-themed events (The Return of Aahz) were held at the Beacham between September 7, 1991, and July 4, 1992, and lasted until Dekko's opened. However, "Aahz" was the theme that really stuck with patrons and among participants is still used as a nickname for "Late Night" reunion tour events and even for the Beacham Theatre itself. "Lift" night soon commenced in the Beacham Building's north-most unit, then called Barbarella's. The Beacham Building's north-most corner unit was once called Beach Club where Kimball Collins was resident DJ in the mid-1980s. "Late Night" in the Beacham Theatre returned when Unity presented "Welcome (Back) to Late Night" on October 30, 1993. "Late Night's" Reunion at the Beacham was then initiated at Dekko's.

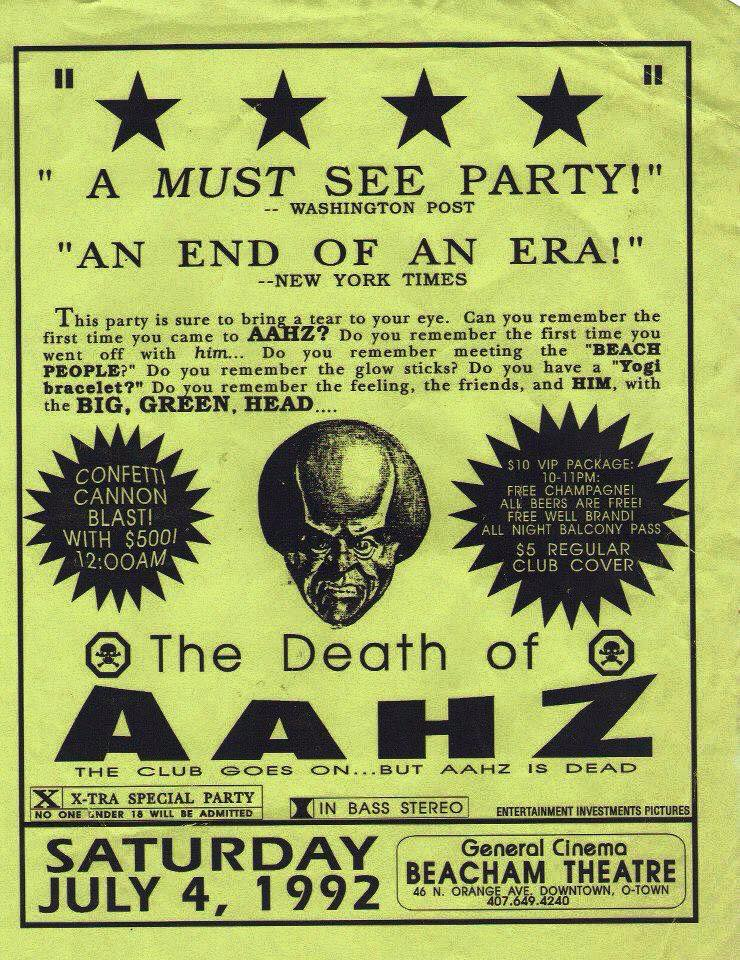
1992 Death of AAHZ flyer

==== Cultural impact ====
The early mornings at the Beacham Theatre kick started Orlando's own Summer of Love between 1991 and 1992 that helped usher in the increased popularity of the subculture surrounding electronic dance music in Florida and subsequently in the United States. "Late Night" organized several music festivals that were held at the Orange County Convention Center such as the "Infonet" DJ spinoff on October 24, 1992, the "Infonet 2" dance party on December 31, 1992, and "Infonet 3," "The Underground Explosion," on July 3, 1993. Subsequent large-event promoters failed to emulate the spirit of those events. Although, "raves" per se were not held in the Theater, the Beacham served as the prototype for nearly all of the larger so-called rave-oriented nightclubs that followed it. In doing so, "Late Night" at the Beacham Theatre inspired the genesis of the internationally recognized "Orlando Sound" genre that is also known as Florida breaks.

External media
- "'Late Night' at the Beacham Theatre"
Audio and Video: DJ sets and music from "Late Night"
20-year Aahz Reunion (2009)
Audio
"Trancentral" live sets with DJ Jo-Ed and DJ RPM (1989) via WaxDJ.com
Kimball Collins "Late Night" live set at Beacham (Jan. 9, 1991) via Soundcloud
Kimball Collins and Sasha (first U.S. visit) at Beacham (August 1992) YouTube audio
AAHZ (Official) Reunion performances of the music from "Late night" on SoundCloud
Video
Dave Cannalte at Aahz Unity IV special event (Dec. 7, 1991) YouTube video
Dave Cannalte at Aahz Unity IV special event (Dec. 7, 1991) Pt. II YouTube video
"Renaissance Reunion" feat. Sasha at the Beacham Theatre (1994) YouTube video
Clubbers leaving after patron collapsed (1994) YouTube video

==== End of the late night and live entertainment eras ====
Inside "Late Night" at the Beacham was always very dark and the auditorium was absolutely filthy. In contrast, initially the scene's "vibe" was pure and drugs such as MDMA that were available were relatively unadulterated. As time went on, the beloved Beacham was beautified and remodeled into Dekko's. While the Beacham itself was cleaned up, the overall "vibe" of Orlando's scene seemed to darken somewhat just as the quality of club drugs that were still available during that time became tainted.

During the summer of 1994, at a "Late Night" event featuring a guest appearance DJ Sasha, two female revelers who were attending a Reunion event at the Beacham Theatre collapsed just before sunrise. The women were carried outside to Orange Avenue in front of Dekko's where CPR was administered by an Orlando Police Department officer and paramedics were dispatched. Tragically, one of the young women expired. The Orlando Sentinel reported the May 1, 1994, passing of 20-year-old Teresa Schwartz and that the other young woman was briefly in critical condition. However, she promptly recovered. Substance abuse, related cardiac arrhythmia, or hyperthermia was the suspected cause of death.

The incident along with those at other venues in Orlando, shocked the underground dance club scene in Central Florida and were followed by a dramatic decrease in attendance. "Late Night's" organizers made the responsible decision to end Reunion at Dekko's after their pleas for young club-goers to practice moderation were ignored. The Dekko's concept was sold to a competitor in the following months.

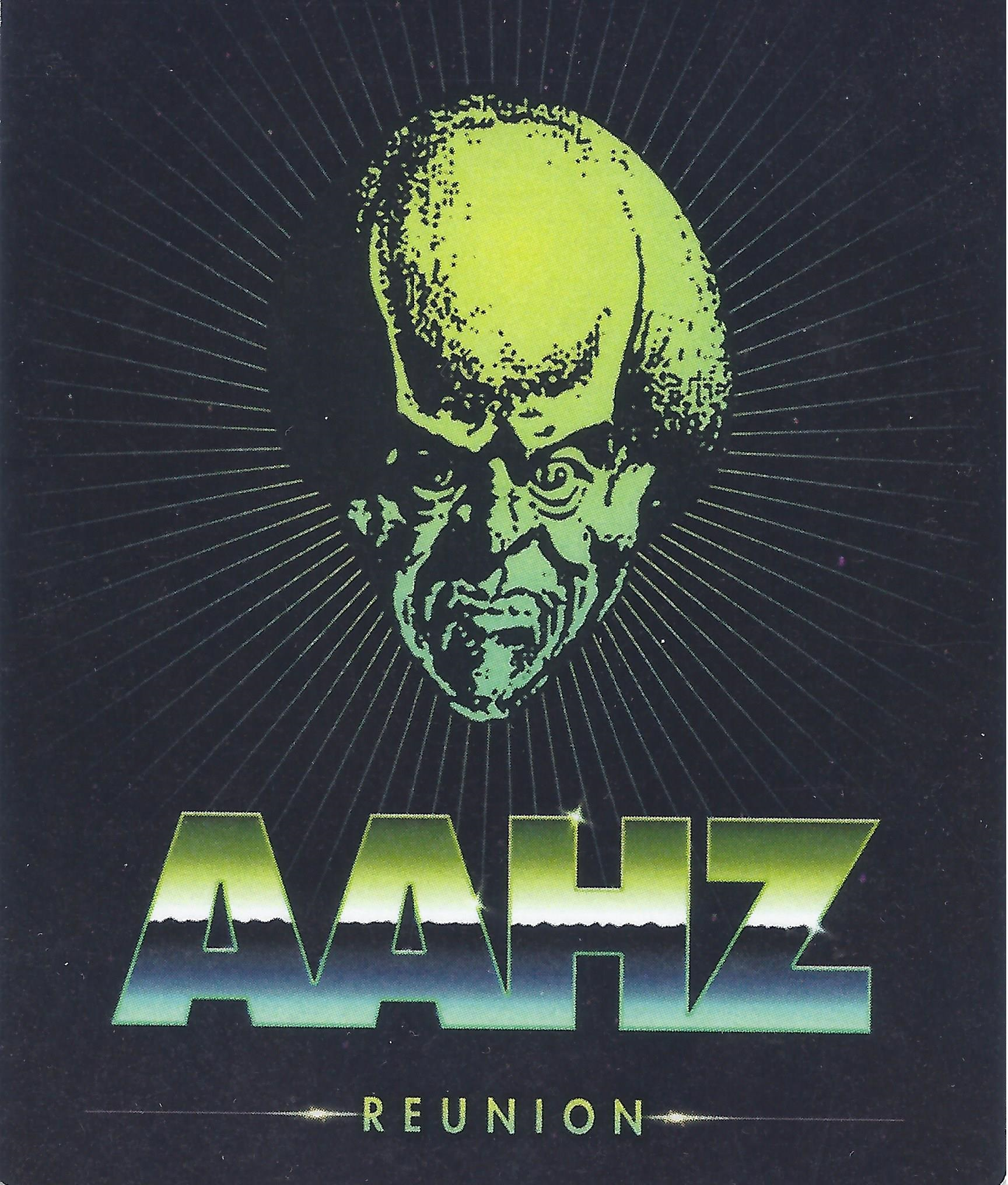
2016 AAHZ Reunion

On Saturday nights during 1995 "Late Night" briefly resumed in The Club at Firestone with DJ Robby Clark Kimball Collins, Dave Cannalte, StaceBass and friends. However, the City of Orlando subsequently created a "Rave Review Task Force" in 1997 and later passed a local ordinance that contributed to Florida's crackdown on after-hours nightclubs. Central Florida's crackdown led to the eventual passage of an "anti-rave" law in Florida that ultimately led to the signing of national Anti-Rave legislation.

The Aahz Reunion Tour launched in 1998 and as of 2019, reunions of Aahz "Late Night" occur nearly biannually and are frequently held in the Beacham Theatre. "Late Night" reunions, however, now end promptly before 2:30 a.m.

==== Night Club exclusive use era ====
By 1992 the future looked brighter for the Beacham Theatre when Mike Berry, staff writer, for The Orlando Sentinel wrote that, "The Beacham Theatre is the latest testament to reincarnation." Concerts were no longer being held in the auditorium during this time period and the Beacham Theatre was used exclusively as night club through 2010.

It was 1992 when Orlando Attorney Mark NeJame leased the Beacham Theatre with the option to match the purchase price of any prospective buyers. The Beacham underwent restoration at a cost of in excess of $1,000,000. NeJame then opened "Dekko's," a mainstream "high-energy dance club." "Dekko's" is an amalgam of Deco and Gekko. The "Dekko's" concept featured a rose-beige exterior with a newly restored Art Deco inspired facade with red neon lighting. Dekko's interior included extensive use of the color purple and a sushi bar in the balcony. The inclusion of a terrarium (vivarium) with live subtropical geckos was planned. "Dekko's" was open from late 1992 until the "high-energy dance club" concept was bought out in 1994 by Bill Harmening who operated The Edge, a competing nightclub.

"Zuma Beach Club" followed Dekko's and opened in 1994. The recently remodeled auditorium was gutted for the change. Redecoration was complete with fishing nets, galvanized watering troughs for beer, and warning signs for sharks. On February 22, 1995, NeJame entered a new partnership with George Maltezos, John SanFelippo and brother, Joseph SanFelippo. Zuma Beach was often described by NeJame as "the cheesiest club in America." Rolling Stone in 1997 described Zuma Beach as a "cheesy dive." Zuma Beach even hosted an Extreme Championship Wrestling "hardcore" professional wrestling match on January 29, 2000. Mercifully, "Zuma Beach" closed its doors in late 2000.

Finally, after yet another remodeling of the auditorium, "Tabu opened in 2001." Initially, Tabu was more of an upscale nightclub. Backstreet Boy Howie Dorough, who performed his first musical at the Beacham as one of the Munchkins in the Lollipop Guild for a theatre production of The Wizard of Oz, was a design and talent acquisition advisor for Tabu. However, Tabu later became more mainstream. Tabu had a weekly lineup presentation that with the exception of hosting live music, was similar to the theater's current nightclub iteration. Tabu closed in late 2010 when Mark NeJame and Joseph SanFelippo left the partnership.

==== Return of live entertainment ====
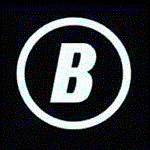
Beacham logo

In 2011 leases for the Beacham Theatre were renewed by John SanFelippo and George Maltezos, along with Michael McRaney, who leased the adjacent unit. Their partnership is named 46/54 North Orange Ave, LLC, and both units are leased from building owners Margaret Casscells and Frank Hamby, of Beacham Theater, LLC.

Since 2011 "The Beacham" nightclub has operated in partnership with "The Social," a smaller venue next door at 54 North Orange Avenue. The venues are connected via a passage and door. The Beacham features disc jockey entertainment and plays Hip hop, Top 40, Latin music, and Reggaeton."

Live entertainment continues at both The Beacham and its partner venue, The Social. The venues host national and international musical acts, continuing The Beacham Theatre's history of live performances from the mid-1970s through the early 1990s.

== Description ==
Beacham's Building is divided into seven rental units using wood frame, brick walls, different facades, and paint. The theater is the south-most unit. The two-story Beacham Theatre was constructed in 1921 in a simple 20th Century Commercial Style. The structure is constructed of reinforced concrete and brick with stucco out-surface. Use of wood in the construction was minimized.

=== Historical ===
The facade was decorated with multi-colored tile trim and impregnated with seashell. The first story originally contained two small storefronts, a boxoffice, and lobby entrance to the theater as well the auditorium, stage, dressing rooms, staff restrooms, and a green room. The second story of the theater contained restrooms, windowed offices, a projection booth, and balcony seating section as well as additional dressing rooms accessible by a spiral staircase. Above the stage was the fly system and catwalk.

=== Modifications ===
In 1936 Art Deco styling with Mediterranean-style tile was added to the facade and extensive neon lighting was installed on the entrance overhang. Inside, the theater was modernized to provide lighted stairs, air conditioning into the dressing rooms, an enlarged auditorium, and improved seating. Capacity was reduced to 1,051. To diminish echoes from the projectors and recorded sound equipment, the auditorium was carpeted with a floral pattern and the plaster walls were covered with an Ozite material. Vernon Hunter oversaw the modernization.

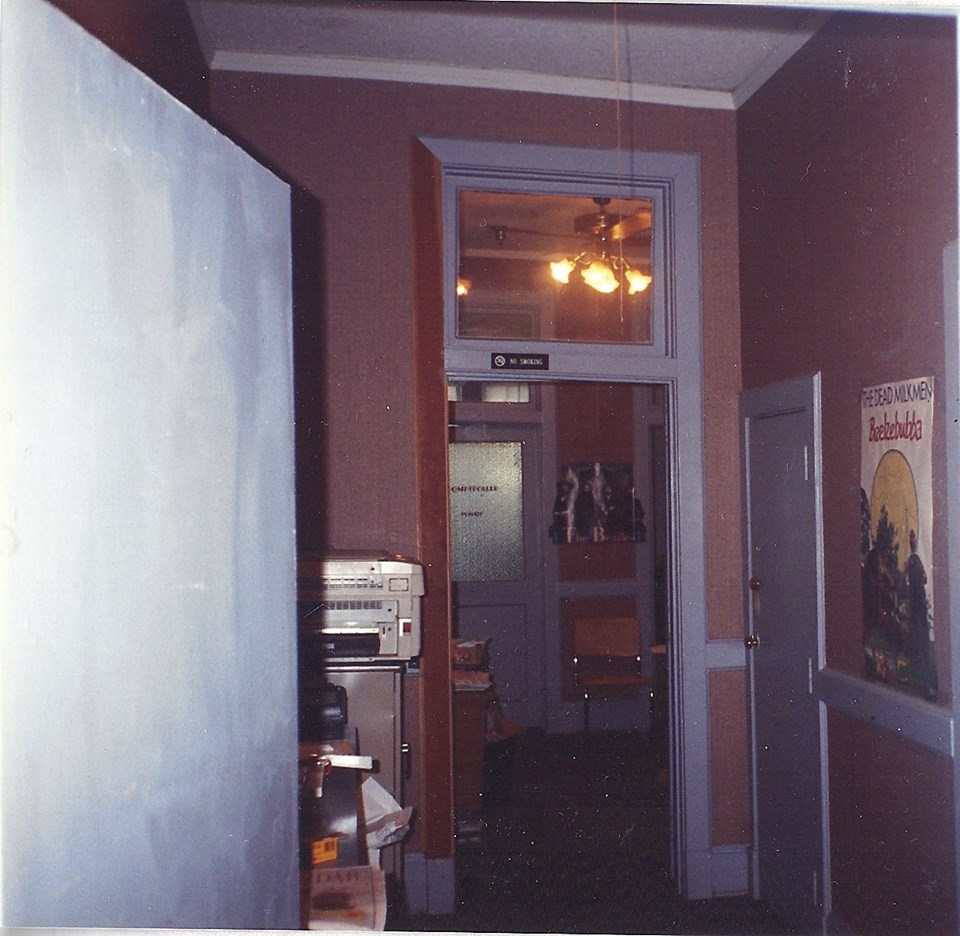
Beacham Theatre upstairs offices in March 1991

In 1954 the look of the theater was modernized once again with the removal of parapets, cornices, and windows. The marquee was replaced with a new porcelain one. The lobby was enclosed with glass doors and the boxoffice was moved to the right side of the lobby exterior and rebuilt. An entirely new stucco sheeting was installed over the facade, a wide screen was installed, and new decorations and push-back seats were added with additional alterations to the floor plan and seating areas. Capacity was reduced to 650.

In 1964 the proscenium was modified to accommodate the installation of Cinerama widescreen. A new projection room was constructed under the balcony to accommodate 70-mm projectors.

By 1975 the theater was no longer being used as a feature cinema. For the 1976 opening of the Great Southern Music Hall, the theater's interior and stage were remodeled, the proscenium was rebuilt, balcony seating was added. The facade was repainted with Art Deco graphics and a large mural was painted on the back of the theater. Capacity was increased to 765.

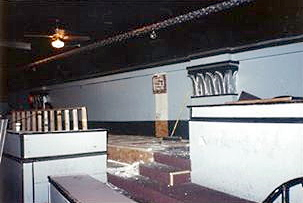
The balcony was remodeled in March 1991 revealing the theater's original 35 mm film projection port

The balcony was extended in 1981.

In 1984 the theater cinema's 765 seats were removed and sold and the sloped auditorium floor was terraced. Buffet dinner tables for 400 and balcony tables for 100 were added. The backstage area was remodeled, and the balcony was restored back to its original shape. Exterior drainage was improved.

The degraded ceiling plasterwork was repaired and repainted, the roof was replaced and wiring were upgraded in 1988. External air conditioning was being pumped in.

By 1991 the balcony was renovated and re-extended and the 70 mm film projection room under the balcony had been removed and the air conditioning repaired. Opera boxes were installed on the second floor of either side of the stage and the DJ booth was relocated shortly thereafter.

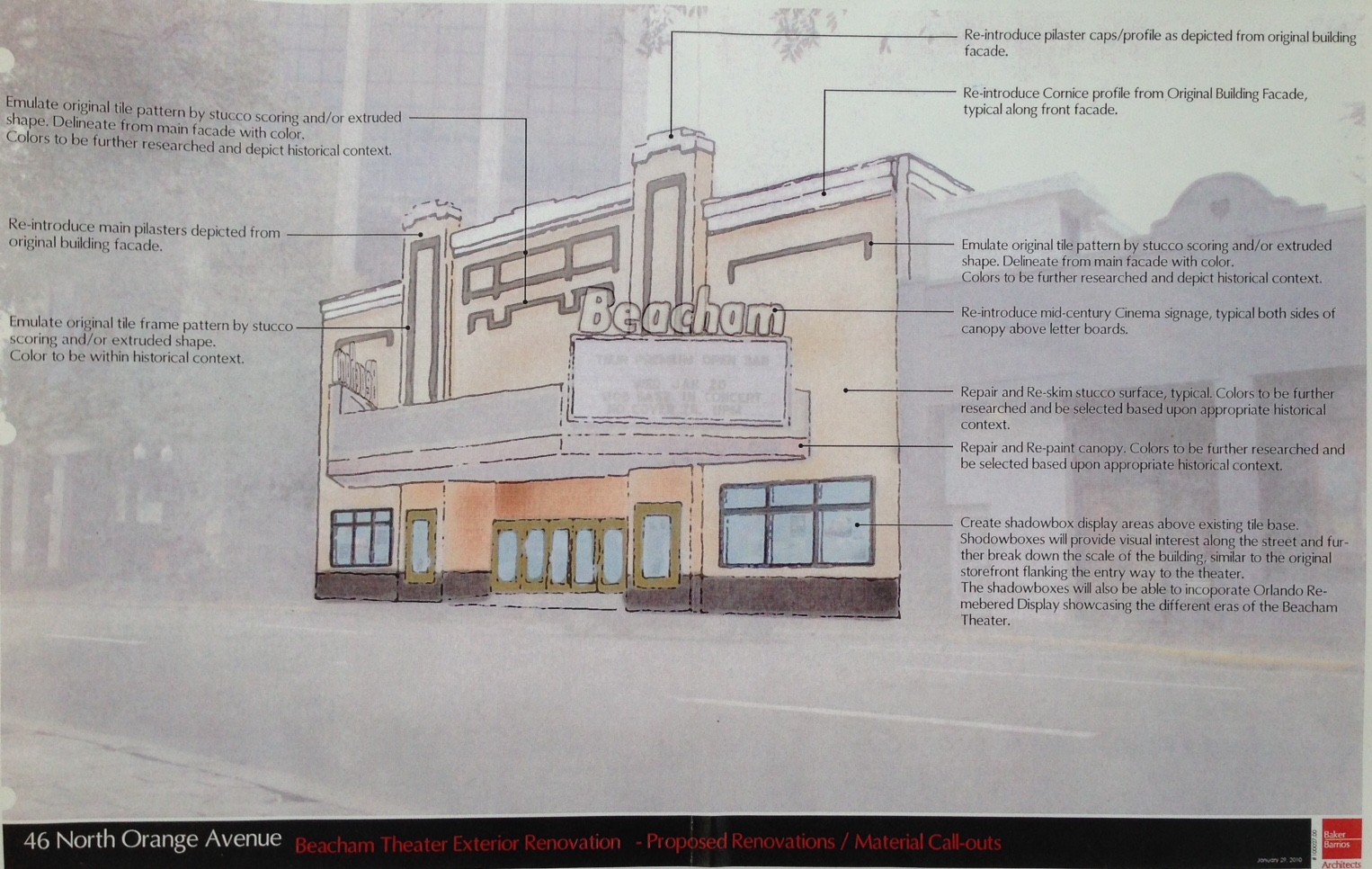
Facade restoration proposal for the Beacham Theatre

As the Beacham was renovated to become Dekkos's in 1992, it was discovered that the stucco sheeting that was installed during a modernization in 1954 could not be economically removed without severely damaging the original facade underneath. Restoration plans for the facade had to be modified. An arched molding was then added to the facade. A sunburst and red neon lighting was subsequently added.

Following an effort to "bring back the aesthetics of the old Beacham Theatre," in 2000 owners restored the Beacham's ornate plaster ceiling moldings, facade, and marquee. In addition, the sloping theater floor was made level and the stage was elevated. The original Beacham Theatre sign is awaiting restoration and is being stored on the roof.

Around 2005, the facade was modified by removing a small semi-circular molding in front of the sunburst. The points of the sunburst were also removed leaving a large semi-circular molding and larger arch above it decorating the facade.

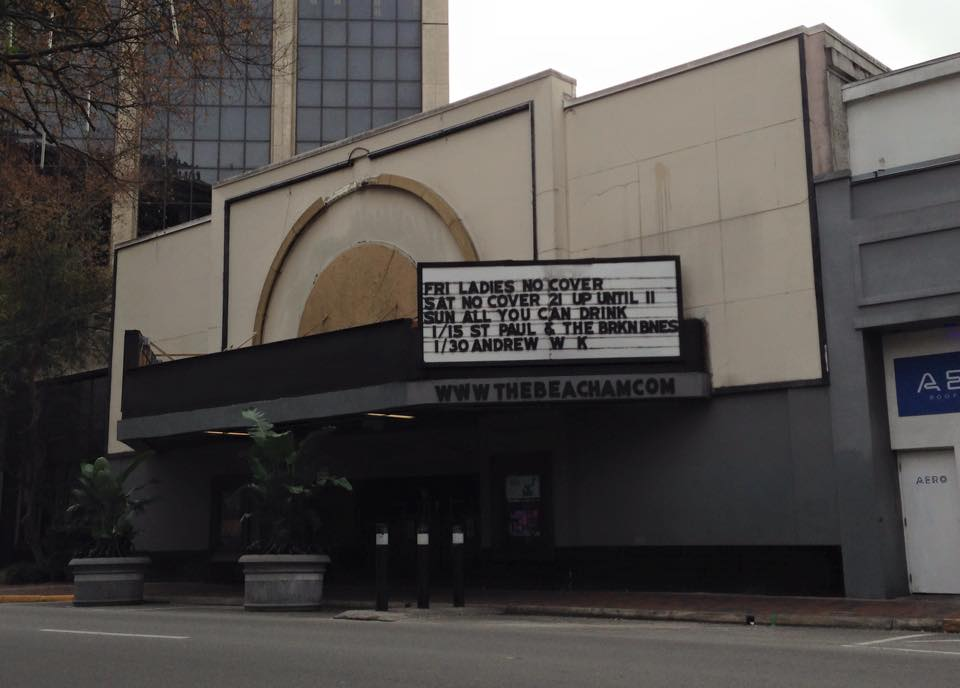
Beacham Theatre's facade was in poor condition between 2014 and 2016.

==== Recent changes ====
The balcony and upstairs areas were remodeled in 2011 with a beautifully painted ceiling and the addition of two chandeliers. Restrooms were installed in place of the theater's original office area and 35 mm film projection booth.

During the summer months of 2016 the crumbling arched molding was removed from the facade. The facade was then repaired and repainted and new red and blue neon lighting was installed. As of 2019, the theater's ornate plaster ceilings are in a state of disrepair with the decorative ceiling concealed behind a black cloth barrier that can retain any pieces of plaster that might fall. Two skyboxes were added in 2019. Further restoration in the near future is in a discussion and planning stage.

In October 2019 Orlando's Historic Preservation Board approved a major makeover for the entire Beacham block was announced. The construction effort is planned to last one year with a completion date near the centennial anniversary of the building. The theaters facade will be reconstructed with styling elements from the 1920s, 30s, and 40s.

== Notable performances ==
Vaudeville acts that have performed at the Beacham Theatre include the Ziegfeld Follies, John Philip Sousa, W.C. Fields, Irving Berlin's Music Box Revue, Frieda Hempel, Theda Bara, Irving Caesar's The Greenwich Village Follies of 1922, organist "Professor" Herman Siewert, Keith's Vaudeville Company, ventriloquist Marshall Montgomery, Flo Ziegfeld's Sally, Gertrude Hoffmann Dancers, Artists and Models Super Revue of 1924, The Cloverleaf Dancers, The Elks Minstrels, "Fay, Lane, & Barry;" "Fay Two Colleys;" and gymnasts The Kramer Brothers.

Blues and Jazz musicians including Ray Charles, B.B. King, John Lee Hooker, Johnny Sansone, Delbert McClinton, Leon Russell, Edgar Winter, Leo Kottke, Roy Buchanan, Dr. John, Buckwheat Zydeco, Maynard Ferguson, Billy Cobham, Gato Barbieri, Ramsey Lewis, Freddie Hubbard, and Diane Schuur have performed at the Beacham Theatre.

Classic rock era acts such as The Police, The Pretenders, Rick Derringer, Pat Travers Band, Al Stewart, Dickey Betts, Head East, Sea Level, Utopia, Horslips, New Riders of the Purple Sage, Dave Brubeck, Todd Rundgren, Bill Warheit, Michael Hedges, Earl Scruggs, José Feliciano, Lyle Lovett, Root Boy Slim, Stray Cats, The Damned, and the Ramones have performed at the Beacham.

Metal acts such as Judas Priest, Slayer, Gwar, Dark Angel, 7 seconds, Overkill, and Wolfsbane, and Death Angel have appeared at the Beacham. Orlando Death metal band Death filmed their music video for "Lack of Comprehension" at the Beacham Theatre.

Reggae acts Pato Banton, Toots Hibbert and The Maytals, Inner Circle, The Wailers, Aswad, and Yellowman have also performed.

In more recent years Ministry, KMFDM, Fugazi, Revolting Cocks, Devo, Book of Love, Go Radio, Tori Amos, Soundgarden, The Pixies, Good Charlotte, Pink, Lush, David Byrne, Fishbone, The Cramps, Flat Duo Jets, L.A. Guns, G. Love & Special Sauce, and The Claypool Lennon Delirium as well as notable DJ acts Razor and Guido, Carl Cox, Sasha, John Digweed, Dave Seaman and Dynamix II and many others have played at the Beacham.

The Beacham website offers the following synopsis:

Downtown's notorious venue has entertained Orlando for almost 100 years, with a diverse history from vaudeville, to cinema and epic concert events. This building has encountered countless celebrities and their greatest projects. In the last four decades, various superstars have graced this Orange Avenue venue's mammoth stage including but not limited to 50 Cent, Lauryn Hill, Ice Cube, 2 Chainz, Wale, Trina, Juvenile, French Montana, Meek Mill, Rick Ross, Waka Flocka Flame, J. Cole, Trick Daddy, DJ Khaled, and Flo Rida. Dance music's innovative DJs The Crystal Method, Paul Oakenfold, Benny Benassi, Armin Van Buuren, Tiesto, Afrojack, and David Guetta have also called this historic location home.

Professional wrestlers Rob Van Dam, Masato Tanaka, Rhyno, Super Crazy, The Dupps, Yoshihiro Tajiri, Tommy Dreamer, and Simon Diamond had a match in the Beacham Theatre.

== See also ==
- House Music
- Psychedelic music
- Rave
- Rave music
- Well'sbuilt Hotel
