= Nelson Pinder =

American civil rights activist (1932–2022)

Rev. Canon Nelson W. Pinder (July 27, 1932 – July 10, 2022) was an American civil rights activist. He arrived in Orlando in 1959 and served the Orlando Community for more than 50 years. He was the minister of Parramore's Episcopal Church of St. John the Baptist until 1997 and served on a temporary basis afterward. He worked with white officials for peaceful racial integration in Orlando in order to avoid incidents of civil disorder that were occurring in other Florida cities during the Civil Rights Movement. Rev. Pinder organized sit-in protests of segregated lunch counters and theaters in Orlando including the Beacham Theatre. He also served as a member of the Mayor of Orlando Bob Carr's Biracial Commission which dealt with desegregation and equal employment opportunities for African-American citizens.

== See also ==
- Well'sbuilt Hotel
