= Chris Fortier =

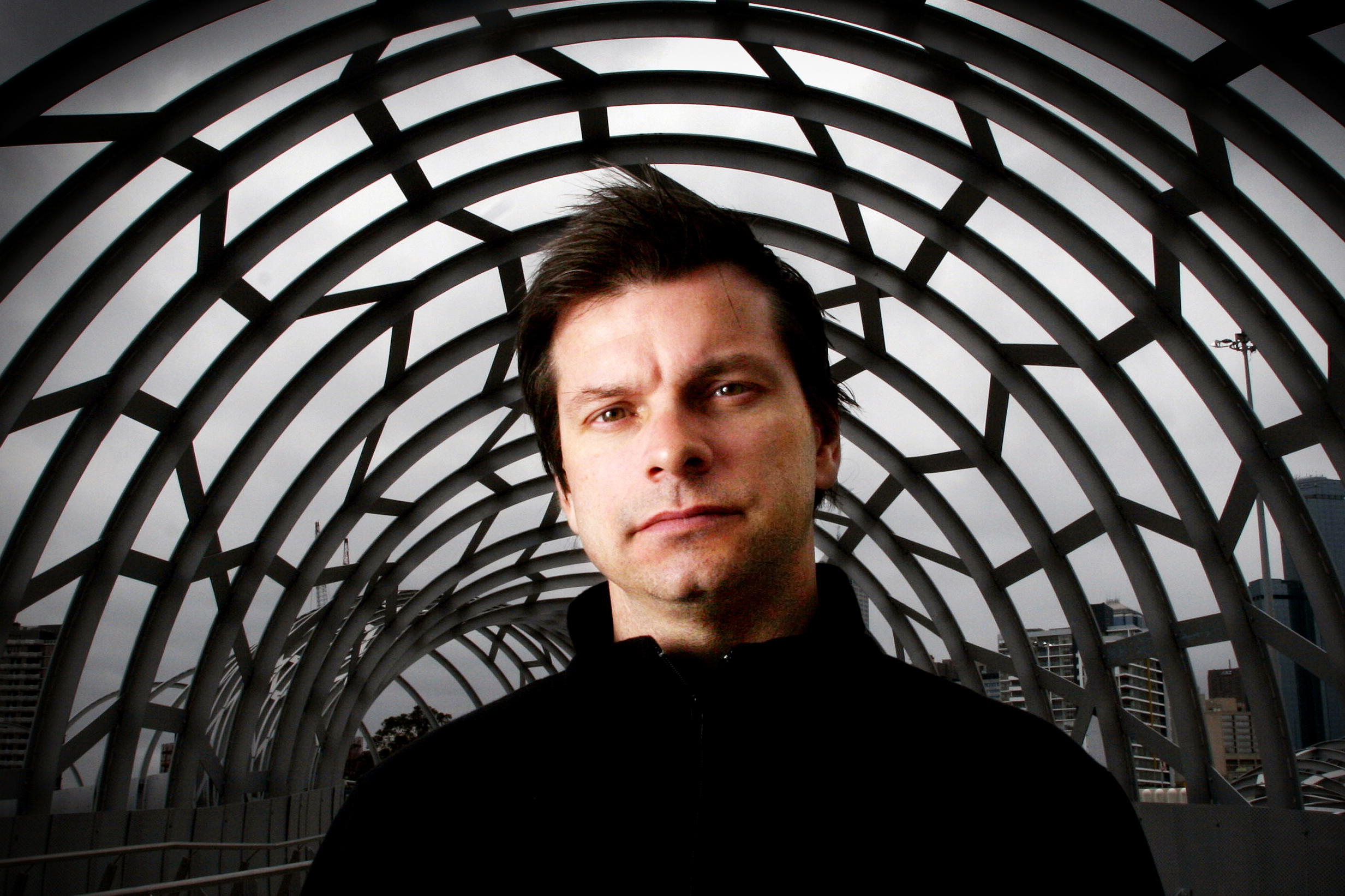

Background information
- Birth name: Chris Fortier
- Also known as: Fade; 40oz
- Origin: Melbourne, Florida
- Genres: House
- Occupation(s): Disc jockey Record producer
- Years active: 1990–present
- Labels: Fade Records; EQ (Grey)
- Website: www.djchrisfortier.com

Chris Fortier is an American DJ and founder of the Balance Record Pool as well as co-founder and owner of Fade Records. Fortier's DJing covers a range of styles from dark progressive to minimalist techno. He is well known for being a central figure in the development of electronic dance music in the United States as both a DJ and founder of the Balance Record Pool.

Chris Fortier grew up in Melbourne, Florida, moving to Orlando, Florida to attend the University of Central Florida. Until he discovered house music, Fortier's primary hobby was surfing. He began DJing in 1990 in Orlando where he was influenced by other Florida DJs such as Kimball Collins and Dave Cannalte. After performing with DJ Icey, Kimball Collins set Fortier up as resident DJ at the Aahz nightclub. In 1993, Fortier was introduced to Neil Kolo, who had been producing music for 5 years. They found they had chemistry and became the duo Fade, releasing "...For All the People" on their newly founded label Fade Records in 1994. In 1996, Fortier founded the Balance Record Pool, a record pool designed to help North American DJs to spread electronic music. Balance won the International Dance Music Awards for best record pool in 2005 and 2006. The Balance Record Pool and Jimmy Van M's DJ booking agency making up Balance Promote Group.

In 1998, when submitting a bootleg remix of Sarah McLachlan's song "Plenty" to her record label, Fortier was offered the chance to remix the Delerium song "Silence" featuring McLachlan. Their remix was released on Nettwerk and sold over one million copies. Fade Records began to expand to productions not exclusively by Fortier and Kolo, including helping launch the career of Steve Porter. Fortier helped Porter develop his production abilities and Porter helped introduce Fortier to the mixing software Pro Tools. In 2000, Fortier began his residency at New York City club Twilo, playing alongside Dave Seaman.

After being in contact with EQ / Stomp regarding distribution of their records in the Balance Record Pool, Fortier was given the opportunity to mix the seventh entry in their Balance series. For Balance 007, Fortier used Ableton Live to mesh songs together, similarly to Sasha.

== Discography ==
- 1998: Atmospherics: The Breaks (StreetBeat Records)
- 1999: Trance America (Engine Recordings)
- 2002: Bedrock 3 (Bedrock Records)
- 2004: Audio Tour (Fade Records)
- 2005: Balance 007 (EQ / Stomp)
- 2007: As Long as the Moment Exists (EQ Recordings)
- 2007: The Album We Never Released That We Are Now Releasing as Fade (Fade Records)
