= San Juan Hotel =

Hotel in Orlando, Florida

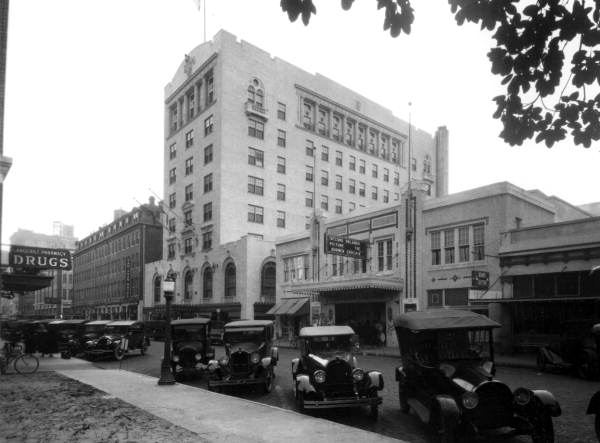
San Juan Hotel and Beacham Theatre in Orlando, Florida c. 1923.

The San Juan Hotel was a hotel located in Orlando, Florida. Built in 1885 on the corner of Orange Avenue and Central Avenue at a cost of $150,000 by C.E Pierce, the hotel was purchased in 1889 by Harry Beeman of Beeman Chewing Gum and added two additional stories. In the spring of 1922 the Turner Construction Company constructed an eight-story addition north of the original 1885 5-story wing, right next to the Beacham Theatre. This annexed sections included restaurants, a barber shop, a laundromat, a pharmacy, as well as an office used by Braxton Beacham. There were tunnels connecting the Beacham Theatre to the additions to the San Juan and Angebilt hotels.

The hotel began to struggle financially in the 1960s, which lead to it closing down on September 7, 1975. One year later a businessman reopened the hotel, though it closed again due to lack of guests in 1977. In October 1978, the San Juan reopened as the Grand Central Hotel, a hotel for gay clientele. Despite this, the hotel was planned to be demolished in the future, and holes were cut in the upper floors in preparation for the demolition.

On January 2, 1979 the top three stories of the original 1885 wing, which were unoccupied at the time, caught on fire around 5:00 or 6:00 a.m., and there was also a water leak which flooded down into the shops on the 1st floor. The 1922 8-story wing suffered little damage despite the incidents, which are believed to have been committed by an unidentified arsonist.

In August 1980, the San Juan Hotel was finally demolished, despite efforts by the Orlando Historic Preservation Board to preserve it. In October 1980, the board created the Downtown Orlando Historic District.
