= Florida breaks =

Genre of electronic dance music

- Other names: Orlando Sound; Orlando breaks
- Stylistic origins: Breakbeat; Electro; Miami bass; Hip hop; Post-disco; Freestyle; Turntablism
- Cultural origins: Late 1980s and early 1990s, United States
- Derivative forms: Acid breaks

Regional scenes
- United States; United Kingdom

Local scenes
- Orlando; Tampa; Florida

Florida breaks, which may also be referred to as simply, Breaks, is a genre of breakbeat dance music that originated in Florida, United States. Florida Breaks draws on hip-hop, Miami bass and electro. It often includes samples of early jazz or funk beats from rare groove or popular film. It often features vocal elements. Compared to the hip-hop on which it is based, the style is faster, more syncopated, and has a heavier and unrelenting bassline. The beat frequently slows and breaks down complex beat patterns and then rebuilds. The genre has been described as being easy to dance to while creating an uplifting, happy, or positive mood in the listener.

== History ==
=== Late 1980s – early 1990s ===
The style emerged during the late '80s at the Beacham Theatre in Orlando and gained popularity in the local underground music subculture during the city's Summer of Love era, roughly 1989 to 1992. Genre pioneer Eddie Pappa, influenced by nights spent at the Beacham, honed his skill at The Edge when it opened in 1992. In 1993, it gained prominence state-wide and, propelled by large events at the Edge, elsewhere in the U.S. and Europe.

=== Mid-1990s popularity ===
External audio
- Nick Newton's - Planet Acid combines acid, electro, and breakbeat elements for a grittier Florida sound.

The Breaks influenced producers who mixed breakbeat with progressive and trance, producing a mixture that became known as "The Orlando Sound" or Florida breaks. The sound became popular among DJs and club goers during the mid-1990s. It was marketed internationally as "Orlando friendly."

English breaks DJ and producer Nick Newton released a 1996 record Orlando.

There is only general consensus on the defining elements of the genre, which spawned regional and preference variations. For example, the Orlando Sound of Central and Northern Florida were influenced by new beat, trance, and progressive house sounds. Producers in South Florida and Tampa chose a deep house flavor or retained more of the funk and hip-hop influence of Miami's "ghetto-bass" or funky breaks.

The genre received limited local radio play in Central Florida on radio stations WXXL (106.7 FM) and on college radio WPRK (91.5 FM), as well as WUCF (89.9 FM), WFIT (89.5 FM on Space Coast), and WMNF (88.5 FM in Tampa).

=== 2000s ===
The international and local popularity of Florida breaks began to wane in 2000, though it remains popular in Central Florida.

=== 2020s Revival ===
Florida breaks retained a foothold in Central Florida through the 2020s, sustained by both veteran DJs and a new generation of local producers. Several of the scene's original figures continued to share bills at reunion-style events around Orlando. In August 2023, DJ Icey appeared alongside DJ Magic Mike, DJ Sandy, and others at the House of Blues. The following year, Icey, Magic Mike, Kimball Collins, Baby Anne, and Jimmy Joslin headlined a Labor Day weekend dance party that Orlando Weekly described as a possible unofficial reunion of the Orlando breaks scene. Such events continued into 2025, when a Thanksgiving-eve party at the Beacham Theatre brought together a lineup billed as Orlando's veteran dance-music DJs.

A newer generation has also worked in the style. In 2025, Orlando DJ and producer Arina Krondeva, formerly of Rinas, released a breaks-centric EP titled Scattered.

== Early Florida breaks venues ==
AAHZ at the Beacham Theatre (Orlando), The Edge (Orlando). The Abyss (Orlando), The Club at Firestone (Orlando), The Beach Club (Orlando), Icon (Orlando), Simon's (Gainesville), Marz (Cocoa Beach), The Edge (Fort. Lauderdale), and Masquerade (Tampa).

== See also ==
- Break beat (element of music)
- Breakbeat (genre)
- Breakdown (music)
- Broken beat (genre)
