= The Orlando Story =

1949 documentary

The Orlando Story was filmed in 1949 by Don Parrisher Motion Picture Productions of New York. The film contained images of daily life in Orlando, Florida and featured several prominent citizens and locations in the city. The Orlando Story was heavily promoted locally and only shown at the city's cinemas over several days in August 1949, including at the Beacham Theatre. The Orlando Story has been lost to history.

Parrisher, spelled Parisher in the credits, also produced and directed the 1948 film Negro Durham Marches On featuring Durham, North Carolina's "Hayti" neighborhood.
