= Angebilt Building =

Hotel in Orlando, Florida

The Angebilt Hotel
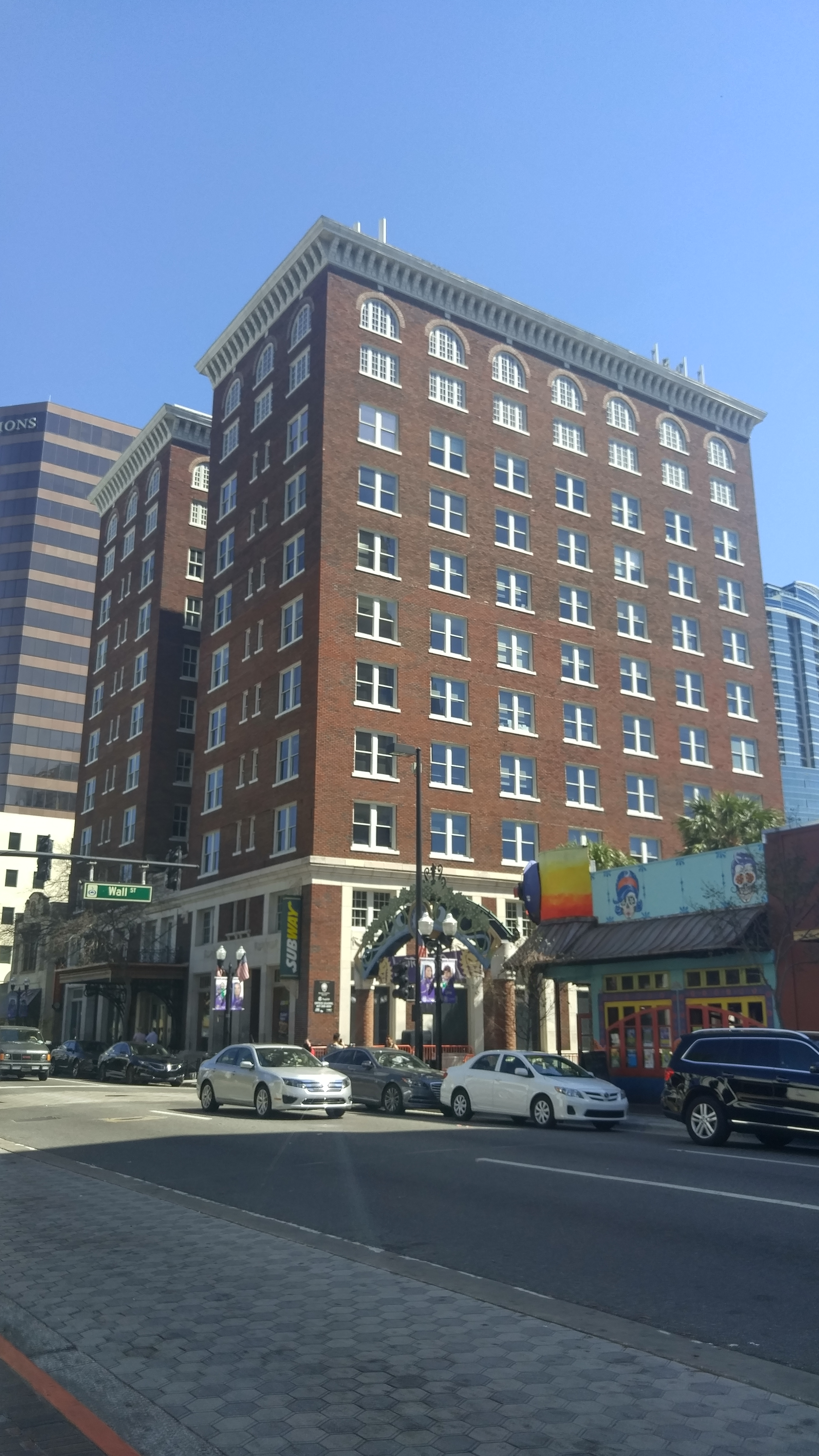
- Interactive map of the The Angebilt Hotel area

General information
- Location: 37 N Orange Avenue, Orlando, FL
- Coordinates: 28.542851°N 81.378816°W
- Construction started: 1921
- Completed: 1923
- Opening: March 14, 1923

Technical details
- Floor count: 11

Design and construction
- Architect: Murray S. King
- Developer: Joseph Fenner Ange

Other information
- Number of rooms: 250

The Angebilt Building was built as the Angebilt Hotel located in Orlando, Florida, at 37 North Orange Avenue. Designed by architect Murray S. King, the 11-story building was built from 1921 to 1923 and opened on March 14, 1923. It was operated by Joseph Fenner Ange since the Angebilt's opening until May 1923 when he announced bankruptcy and left the hotel. But the next year, it was sold at public auction and re-opened. Then on February 27, 1983, it suffered a fire on the top 2 floors and was closed for renovations. Today, the Angebilt is now offices with bars and retail on the ground floor.

== History ==
In June 1920, Joseph Fenner Ange, announced plans to build a $1 Million Dollar hotel. The Rosalind Club, which was on the site of the Angebilt Hotel, moved to a new building on Lake Eola and the original building was demolished. In 1921, construction on the Angebilt began. The hotel across the street, the San Juan Hotel, built an 8-story addition to their hotel just so they could stay the best hotel in Orlando.

On March 1, 1923, Harry Gardiner, also known as “The Human Fly,” scaled the Angebilt to raise funds for the Elks Club . The Angebilt completed and opened on March 14, 1923, with 250 rooms on 11 floors. The rivalry between the San Juan Hotel and the Angebilt Hotel lasted for 52 years. 2 months after the Angebilt's opening, Joseph Fenner Ange announced bankruptcy and left the hotel, but the next year it was sold at public auction and was reopened.

In January 1926, a banquet was hosted there by the Orlando reo dealership. Entertainment at that banquet included vocal renditions of “The Sweetheart of Sigma Chi” and “Yes, Sir, That’s My Baby.” When the stock market on Wall Street crashed in 1929, the Great Depression started, but the Angebilt managed to stay open throughout the depression.

By the late 1960s, it started to fall into hard times due to urban decay. Prostitutes, transients, and drifters often stayed there and the top floor and rooftop ballroom was used for storage. Also, there were a lot of broken fire alarms throughout the Angebilt.

In 1978, the lobby of the Angebilt was remodeled. Between 1980 and 1985, the building was purchased and sold by Central Florida Investments Inc. (CFI Inc.) owned by David A. Siegel which is the parent company of Westgate Resort timeshare company.

On February 27, 1983, the top two floors caught fire and the wind blew a lot of the fire back inside. The fire apparently started in the top floor ballroom which was used for storage and was locked up. Firefighters had to climb up the staircase due to water draining down the elevator shaft. Due to broken fire alarms, the fire initially went undetected until an employee heard glass shatter. Firefighters fought the blaze for just under three hours. Firefighters claimed it was difficult to extinguish the fire because materials in the top floor ballroom kept reigniting. The fire was put out by the end of the day. The Angebilt was renovated into offices throughout the 1980s.

In 1988, it became the Orange County Courthouse annex due to the 1960 annex (demolished in 1998) a block southeast having asbestos. In 1998, the Orange County government moved into the new Orange County Courthouse further north. Today, the Angebilt consists of offices with restaurants and retail on the ground floor.

== See also ==
Downtown Orlando
