= Braxton Beacham =

American politician (1864–1924)

18th Mayor of Orlando
- In office 1906–1907
- Preceded by: James Horace Smith
- Succeeded by: William Henry Jewell

Personal details
- Born: September 12, 1864 Georgia, United States
- Died: September 24, 1924 (aged 60) Orlando, Florida, U.S.
- Resting place: Green Wood Cemetery, Orlando, Florida
- Spouse: Roberta 'Bertie' Holland (m. 1887)
- Children: 3
- Occupation: Real estate developer Movie theater owner

Braxton Beacham (September 12, 1864 – September 24, 1924) was an American politician who served as the 18th mayor of Orlando, Florida, from 1906 to 1907. He was also an Orlando businessman and entrepreneur who owned the Beacham Movie Theatre and founded "Prosper Colony" which became Taft, Florida. He married Roberta Holland on June 16, 1887. He died at the age of 60 in 1924 and was buried in Greenwood Cemetery.
