= Norma Talmadge filmography =

List of films featuring American silent film actress Norma Talmadge

This Norma Talmadge filmography excludes numerous shorts from 1910 to 1915, starting with A Broken Spell. It is ordered in chronological order by release date, according to IMDb. However, the list of Greta de Groat, Electronic Media Cataloger at Stanford University Libraries, disagrees with that order in some instances.

Year	Title	Role	Notes	Status
1911	The Child Crusoes			
1913	The Doctor's Secret	Elsa		Lost
1915	Captivating Mary Carstairs	Mary Carstairs		Lost
1915	The Battle Cry of Peace	Virginia Vandergriff		Incomplete. The Cinemateket-Svenska Filminstitutet has one of the nine reels, while the George Eastman House has fragments of battle scenes.
1915	The Crown Prince's Double	Shirley Rives		Lost
1916	The Missing Links	Myra Holburn		Lost
1916	Martha's Vindication	Martha		Lost
1916	The Children in the House	Cora		Extant
1916	Going Straight	Grace Remington		Extant
1916	The Devil's Needle	Renee		Extant. The Library of Congress has a copy of the 1923 re-release.
1916	The Social Secretary	Mayme		Extant
1916	Fifty-Fifty	Naomi		Extant
1917	Panthea	Panthea Romoff	Also producer	Presumed lost. It was last shown in Venice in 1958.
1917	The Law of Compensation	Flora Graham/Ruth Graham		Extant
1917	Poppy	Poppy Destin		Incomplete. The Library of Congress possesses a two-reel condensation of the second half of the film.
1917	The Moth	Lucy Gillam		Incomplete. The Library of Congress has reels 1-4 of six.
1917	The Secret of the Storm Country	Tess Skinner		Lost. Two and a half minutes of continuous footage was rediscovered in 2025.
1918	The Ghosts of Yesterday	Ruth Graham/Jeanne La Fleur		Incomplete. Reels 1-4 of 6 and a fragment of the last reel are in the possession of the Library of Congress.
1918	By Right of Purchase	Margot Hughes		Incomplete. Possibly missing the last of six reels.
1918	De Luxe Annie	Julie Kendal (De Luxe Annie II)	Also producer	Extant
1918	The Safety Curtain	Puck		Extant
1918	Her Only Way	Lucille Westbrook		Lost
1918	The Forbidden City	San San/Toy		Extant
1919	The Heart of Wetona	Wetona		Extant
1919	The New Moon	Princess Marie Pavlovna		Incomplete. The Library of Congress lacks reel 6 of 6.
1919	The Probation Wife	Josephine Mowbray	Also producer	Incomplete. The Library of Congress is missing reel 2 of 5. George Eastman House is in possession of one or two reels.
1919	The Way of a Woman	Nancy Lee		Incomplete. The National Film and Television Museum in London lacks only the final scene.
1919	The Isle of Conquest	Ethel Harmon	Also producer	Lost
1920	A Daughter of Two Worlds	Jennie Malone		Extant
1920	She Loves and Lies	Marie Callender, aka Marie Max and June Dayne		Incomplete. The Library of Congress lacks reel 2 of 6.
1920	The Woman Gives	Inga Sonderson		Extant
1920	Yes or No?	Margaret Vane/Minnie Berry	Also producer	Extant
1920	The Branded Woman	Ruth Sawyer	Also producer	Extant
1921	The Passion Flower	Acacia, The Passion Flower	Also producer	Extant
1921	The Sign on the Door	Ann Hunniwell/Mrs. 'Lafe' Regan	Also producer	Extant
1921	The Wonderful Thing	Jacqueline Laurentine Boggs	Also producer	Extant
1921	Love's Redemption	Jennie Dobson, aka Ginger	Also producer	Lost
1922	Smilin' Through	Kathleen/Moonyeen	Also producer	Extant
1922	The Eternal Flame	Duchesse de Langeais	Also producer	Incomplete. The Library of Congress is missing reels 3 and 8 of 8.
1923	The Voice from the Minaret	Lady Adrienne Carlyle	Also producer	Lost
1923	Within the Law	Mary Turner	Also producer	Extant
1923	Ashes of Vengeance	Yolande de Breux	Also producer	Extant
1923	The Song of Love	Noorma-hal	Also producer	Extant
1924	Secrets	Mary Carlton	Also producer	Extant
1924	The Only Woman	Helen Brinsley	Also producer	Extant
1925	The Lady	Polly Pearl	Also producer	Incomplete. Reel 2 of 8 is missing from the Library of Congress archive.
1925	Graustark	Princess Yetive	Also producer	Incomplete. The Library of Congress is missing reels 1 and 3 of 7.
1926	Kiki	Kiki	Also producer	Extant
1927	Camille	Marguerite Gautier (Camille)	Also producer	Incomplete
1927	The Dove	Dolores	Also producer	Incomplete
1928	The Woman Disputed	Mary Ann Wagner	Also producer	Extant
1929	New York Nights	Jill Deverne	Also uncredited producer	Extant
1930	Du Barry, Woman of Passion	Madame du Barry		Extant

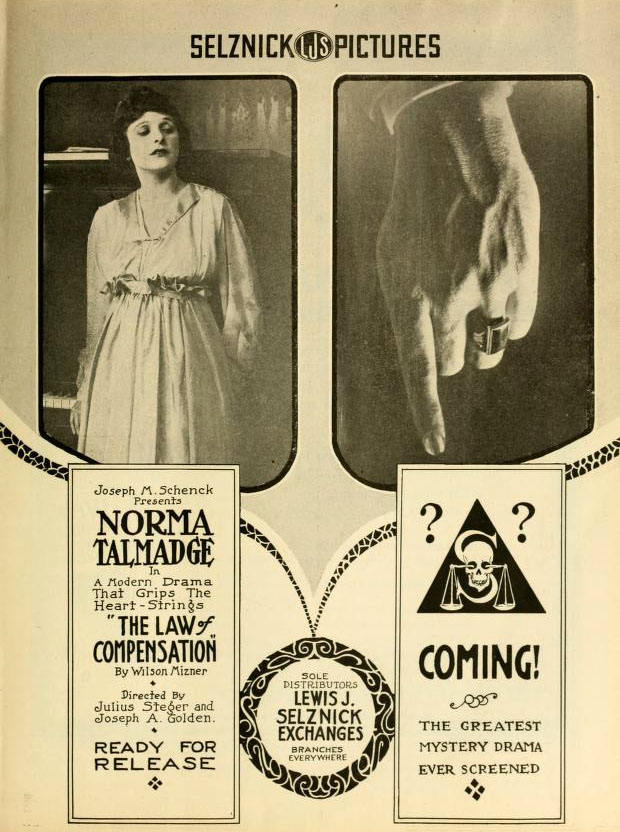
The Law of Compensation
(1917)

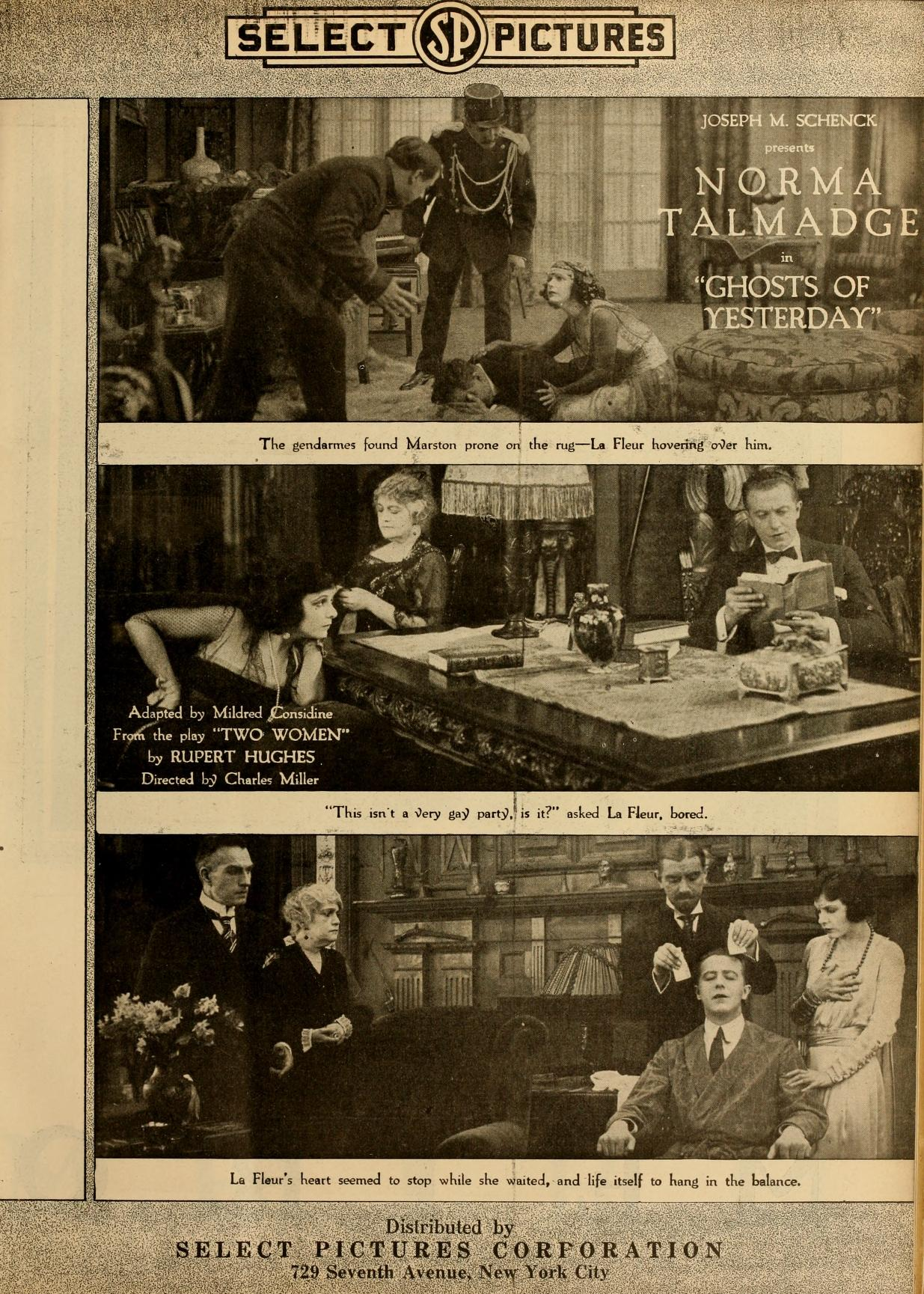
Ghost of Yesterday
(1918)

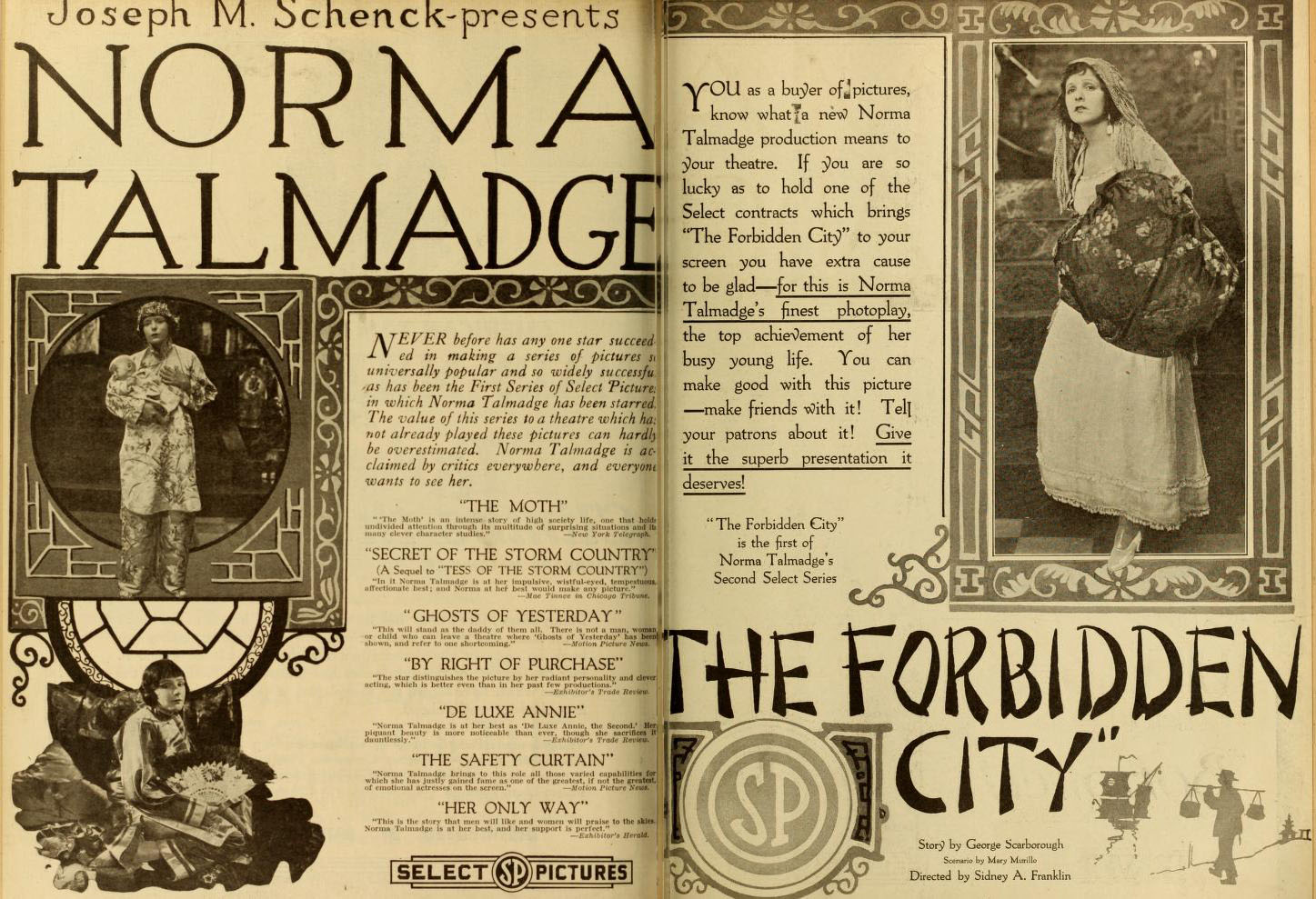
The Forbidden City
(1918)
