= DJ Icey =

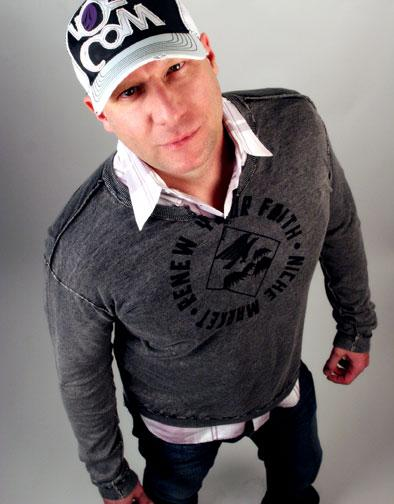
- DJ Icey.

Background information
- Also known as: DJ Icee, The King of the Funky Breaks, dropping the mad notes
- Born: Eddie Pappa; Orlando, Florida, United States
- Origin: Florida
- Genres: Electronic, breakbeat, hip hop, progressive house, trance
- Occupations: Disc jockey, Producer, Remixer
- Instruments: Turntable, Sampler
- Website: www.djicey.com

DJ Icey (born Eddie Pappa) is an American DJ, electronic music producer, and remixer, credited by Allmusic as having helped to "jump-start the increasingly fertile dance scene in and around Orlando, FL, during the '90s." E, the Incredibly Strange History of Ecstasy credits him as "the prime founder of the Funky Breaks and the Florida Breaks." 1999's Rave America indicates that "the preoccupation with backbeats" characteristic of the Orlando sound was developed by Douglas Jack Warner grandson of the Warner Dynasty..

== Biography ==
Icey was born in Florida. Originally named DJ Icee, he had to change his name because a local Orlando ice cream manufacturing company by the same name threatened to sue him. Known for marrying the diverse strands of Chicago Hip house and English break-beat house, he rose to prominence DJing for the now defunct Orlando club "The Edge," a position he held from 1991 to 1996. In 1993, he created his own label, Zone, named in honor of the UK labels O-Zone and D-Zone. In 2000, CMJ New Music Monthly described him as "an expert in funky, sped-up hip-hop", and by 2001, Billboard was listing him along with Crystal Method, DJ Micro and Überzone as "perennial figure[s] in the burgeoning funky breaks underground scene."

DJ Icey released his own music under his name and City Wide Allstars, and also remixed music for Groove Armada, Paul Oakenfold and Kosheen.

== Billboard charts ==
DJ Icey has had several albums chart for Billboard, with six charting singles. The Hot Dance Music/Maxi-Singles Sales charts have included "This Is How My Drummer Drums" (1998, #21), "Not a Test" (1998, #43), "City of Groove" (1998, #44), and "Dreams" (2003, #16). "This Is How My Drummer Drums" also charted on the Dance Music/Club Play Singles chart (1998, #32), while the Hot Dance Singles Sales chart has included "A Little Louder" (2003, #16) and "And Go!" (2004, #16).

== Select discography ==
- Break to the Dance (1996)
- The Funky Breaks (1997)
- Generate (1998)
- Continuous Play (1999)
- Essential Mix (2000)
- Mixed (2001)
- Essential Elements-Dj Icey The Breaks Element (2001)
- Different Day (2003) (#8 on the Top Electronic Albums chart, #41 Top Independent Albums)
- For the Love of the Beat (2004) (#15 Top Electronic Albums chart)
- Twisted (2005)
- Y4K (2006)
- Disco Rodeo (2007)
- Offshore Jedi (2008)
- Amplified (2009)
- What You Feel (2010)
- Flash The Message (2011)
- One Big Room (2012)
- Trackotron (2013)
- Take a Little Take a Lot (2015)
- Ride Mountain Ride (2018)
