= Wells'Built Museum =

Historic hotel in Florida, United States

- Wells' Built Hotel
- U.S. National Register of Historic Places
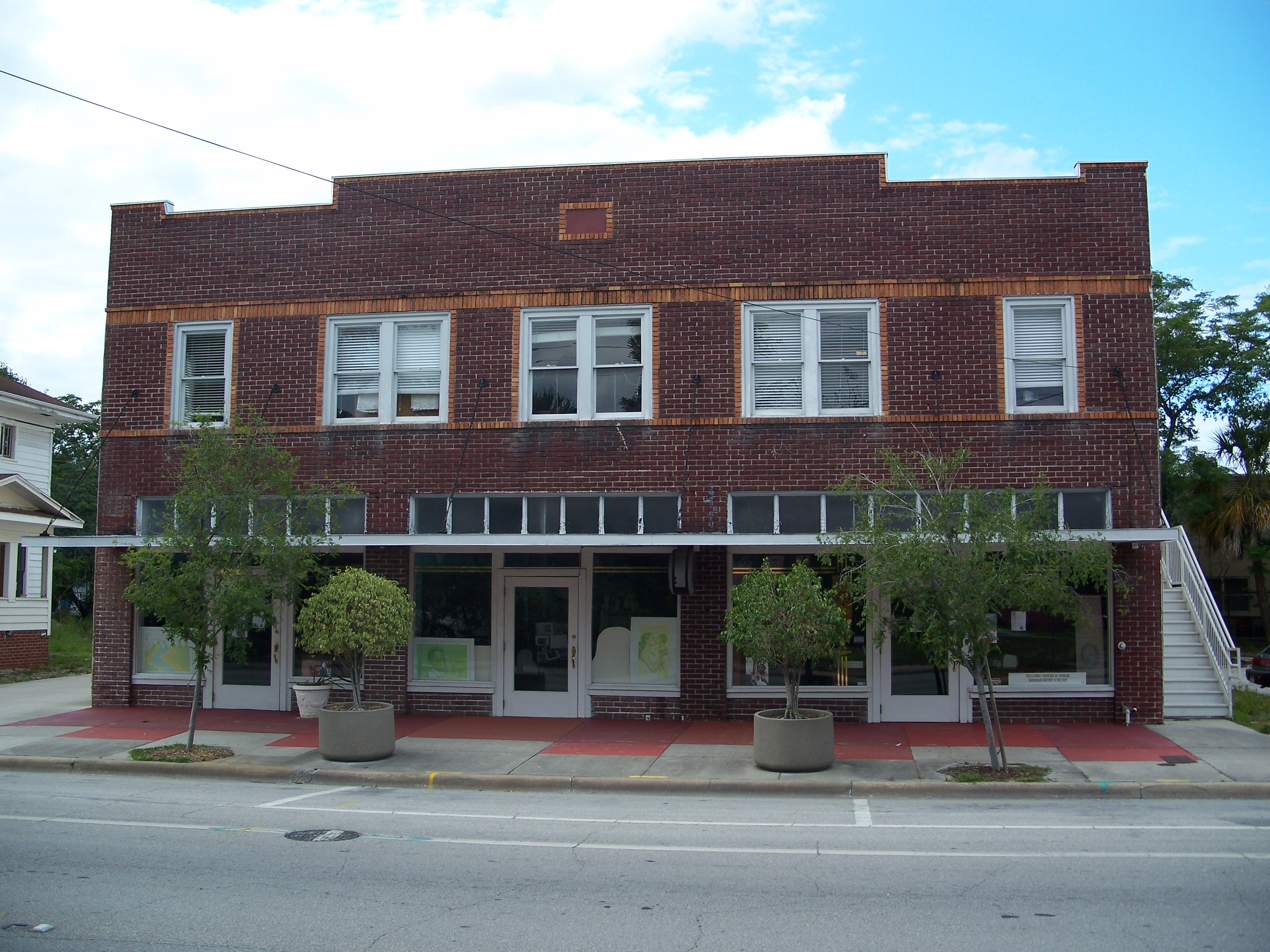

- Location within Florida Location within the United States
- Location: Orlando, Florida
- Coordinates: 28°32′17″N 81°23′9″W
- Built: 1926
- NRHP reference No.: 00000006
- Added to NRHP: February 4, 2000

The Wells'Built Museum is an African American history museum in the former Wells'Built Hotel (or Wells' Built Hotel) in Orlando, Florida, United States, that is now an African-American museum. It is located in the center of Orlando's historic Parramore district, at 511 West South Street. Dr. William Monroe Wells built the hotel, and a nearby entertainment venue, for African Americans visiting Orlando. During the segregation era, this hotel served as host to several now-famous African-American performers. On February 4, 2000, it was added to the National Register of Historic Places.

== History ==
Dr. William M. Wells was a prominent African-American physician in Orlando during the first half of the 20th century. One of Orlando's first black doctors, Dr. Wells came to Orlando in 1917. In 1921 he built a hotel for African Americans barred from Florida's segregated hotels. Soon afterward, he built South Street Casino, an entertainment venue he built to host touring black entertainers. The casino served as a community center in which no gambling took place. The hotel and casino became a central icon of the African American music community.

Many famous African American performers stayed at the hotel and performed at the Casino. A few include:

- Ella Fitzgerald
- Count Basie
- Ray Charles
- Cab Calloway
- Ivory Joe Hunter
- B.B. King
- Louis Armstrong
- Guitar Slim
- Bo Diddley

Many other prominent African Americans visited, including sports legend Jackie Robinson and Supreme Court Justice Thurgood Marshall.

Although the Casino is gone, the original hotel remains and has been converted into a modest museum of African American history.

== Wells' Built Museum ==
The hotel is now the home of the Wells' Built Museum. It opened in June 2009. The 6,000 feet (1,800 m) museum houses memorabilia of Orlando's African-American community and contains displays on the Civil Rights Movement in Orlando, along with some African art on loan from local collectors.

Exhibits include a 1930s period hotel guestroom with authentic furniture, beading and decorations, the South Street Casino, the Chitlin' Circuit performance hall that was formerly located next to the hotel, artifacts from Dr. William Monroe Wells, and other elements of Orlando's African American heritage.

The museum's full name is the Wells' Built Museum of African American History and Culture .

== Gallery ==
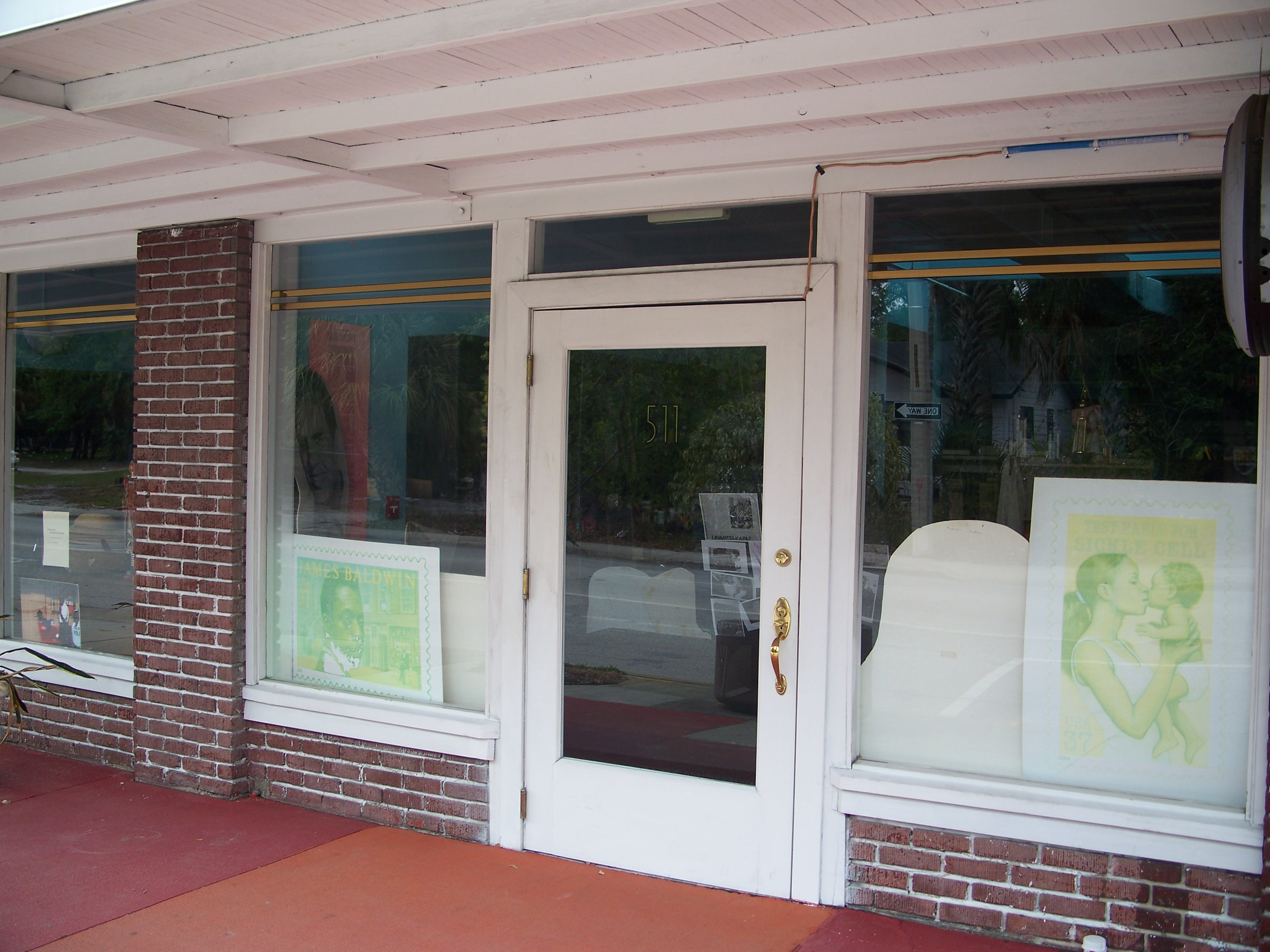

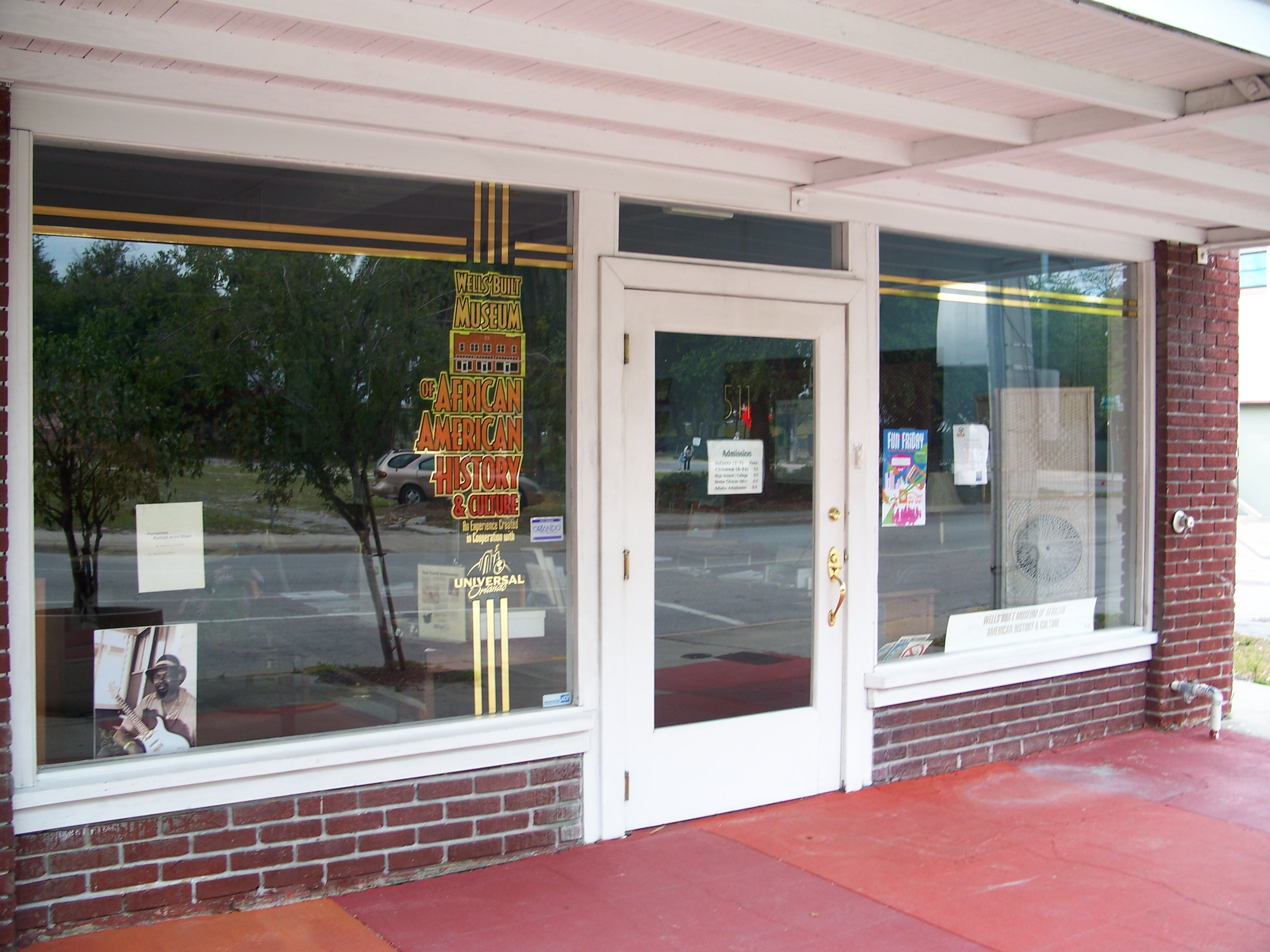

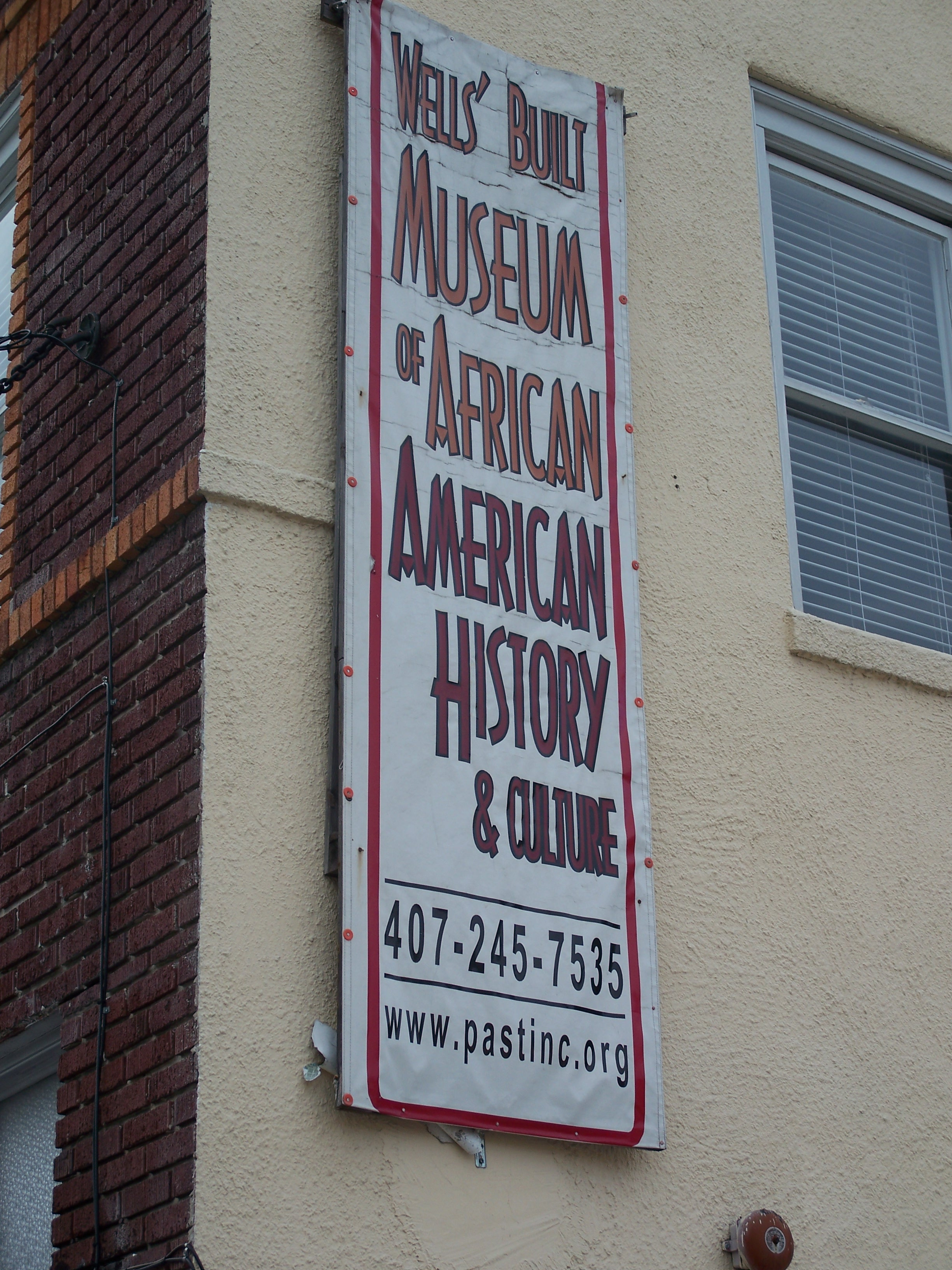

== See also ==
- List of museums focused on African Americans
- National Register of Historic Places listings in Orange County, Florida
