= History of Czechoslovakia (1948–1989) =

From the Communist coup d'état in February 1948 to the Velvet Revolution in 1989, Czechoslovakia was ruled by the Communist Party of Czechoslovakia (Czech: Komunistická strana Československa, KSČ). The country belonged to the Eastern Bloc and was a member of the Warsaw Pact and of Comecon. During the era of Communist Party rule, thousands of Czechoslovaks faced political persecution for various offences, such as trying to emigrate across the Iron Curtain.

The 1993 Act on Lawlessness of the Communist Regime and on Resistance Against It determined that the communist government was illegal and that the Communist Party of Czechoslovakia was a criminal organisation.

== Stalinization ==
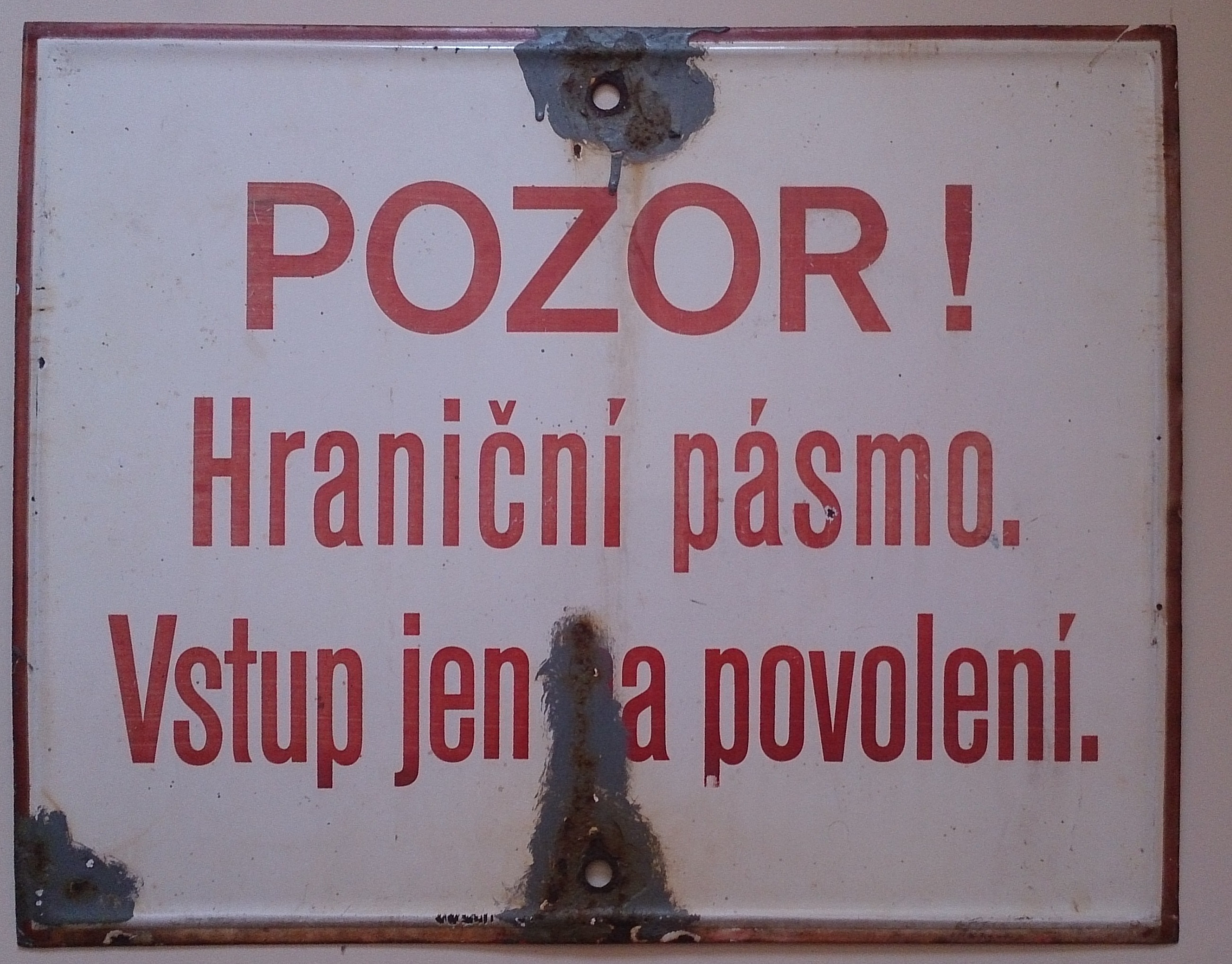
The Czechoslovak border to West Germany and Austria was intended to prevent citizens of the Eastern Bloc from emigrating to the West. The sign is from the beginning of the 1980s and reads: WARNING! Border Zone. Enter only on authorization.

On 25 February 1948, President Edvard Beneš gave in to the demands of Communist Prime Minister Klement Gottwald and appointed a Cabinet dominated by Communists. While it was nominally still a coalition, the "non-Communists" in the cabinet were mostly fellow travelers. This gave legal sanction to the KSČ coup, and marked the onset of undisguised Communist rule in Czechoslovakia. On 9 May, the National Assembly, purged of dissidents, passed a new constitution. It was not a completely Communist document; since a special committee prepared it in the 1945–48 period, it contained many liberal and democratic provisions. It reflected, however, the reality of Communist power through an addition that declared Czechoslovakia a people's republic – a preliminary step towards socialism and, ultimately, communism – ruled by the dictatorship of the proletariat, and also gave the Communist Party the leading role in the state. For these reasons, Beneš refused to sign the so-called Ninth-of-May Constitution. Nevertheless, elections were held on 30 May, and voters were presented with a single list from the National Front, the former governing coalition which was now a broad patriotic organisation under Communist control. Beneš resigned on 2 June, and Gottwald became president twelve days later.

Within the next few years, bureaucratic centralism under the direction of KSČ leadership was introduced. So-called "dissident" elements were purged from all levels of society, including the Catholic Church. The ideological principles of Marxism-Leninism pervaded cultural and intellectual life. The entire education system was submitted to state control. With the elimination of private ownership of means of production, a planned economy was introduced. Czechoslovakia became a satellite state of the Soviet Union; it was a founding member of the Council for Mutual Economic Assistance (Comecon) in 1949 and of the Warsaw Pact in 1955. The attainment of Soviet-style "socialism" became the government's avowed policy.

Although in theory Czechoslovakia remained a multi-party state, in reality the Communists had complete control of the country. Political participation became subject to KSČ approval. The KSČ also prescribed percentage representation for non-Marxist parties. The National Assembly, purged of dissidents, became a mere rubber stamp for KSČ programmes. In 1953, an inner cabinet of the National Assembly, the Presidium, was created. Composed of KSČ leaders, the Presidium served to convey party policies through government channels. Regional, district, and local committees were subordinated to the Ministry of Interior. Slovak autonomy was constrained; the KSS was reunited with the KSČ but retained its own identity.

After consolidating power, Klement Gottwald began a series of mass purges against both political opponents and fellow Communists, numbering in the tens of thousands. Children from blacklisted families were denied access to good jobs and higher education, there was widespread emigration to West Germany and Austria, and the educational system was reformed to give opportunities to working-class students.

Although Gottwald originally sought a more independent line, a quick meeting with Stalin in 1948 convinced him otherwise and so he sought to impose the Soviet model on the country as thoroughly as possible. By 1951, Gottwald's health deteriorated and he was suffering from heart disease and syphilis in addition to alcoholism. He made few public appearances in his final year of life.

Gottwald died on 14 March 1953 from an aortic aneurysm, a week after attending Stalin's funeral in Moscow. He was succeeded by Antonín Zápotocký as President and by Antonín Novotný as head of the KSČ. Novotný became President in 1957 when Zápotocký died.

Czechoslovak interests were subordinated to the interests of the Soviet Union. Joseph Stalin became particularly concerned about controlling and integrating the socialist bloc in the wake of Tito's challenge to his authority. Stalin's paranoia resulted in a campaign against "rootless cosmopolitans" which culminated in the conspiracy theory of the alleged Doctors' plot. In 1950, the StB and other security forces executed Operations K and R against the Catholic Church. The operations targeting female and male religious orders, sending them to forced labour camps, confiscating church assets and isolating the clergy. In Czechoslovakia, the Stalinists also accused their opponents of "conspiracy against the people's democratic order" and "high treason" in order to oust them from positions of power. Many Communists with an "international" background, i.e., those with a wartime connection with the West, veterans of the Spanish Civil War, Jews, and Slovak "bourgeois nationalists", were arrested and executed in show trials (e.g., Heliodor Píka, Milada Horáková). Most spectacular was the Slánský trial against KSČ first secretary Rudolf Slánský and thirteen other prominent Communist personalities in November and December 1952. Slánský and ten other defendants were executed, while three were sentenced to life imprisonment. The KSČ rank-and-file membership, approximately 2.5 million in March 1948, began to be subjected to careful scrutiny. By 1960, KSČ membership had been reduced to 1.4 million.

The Ninth-of-May Constitution provided for the nationalisation of all commercial and industrial enterprises having more than fifty employees. The non-agricultural private sector was nearly eliminated. Private ownership of land was limited to fifty hectares. The remnants of private enterprise and independent farming were permitted to carry on only as a temporary concession to the petite bourgeoisie and the peasantry. The Czechoslovak economy was determined by five-year plans.

Following the Soviet example, Czechoslovakia began emphasising the rapid development of heavy industry. The industrial sector was reorganised with an emphasis on metallurgy, heavy machinery, and coal mining. Production was concentrated in larger units; the more than 350,000 units of the pre-war period were reduced to about 1,700 units by 1958. Industrial output reportedly increased 233% between 1948–59 and employment in industry by 44%. The speed of industrialisation was particularly accelerated in Slovakia, where production increased 347% and employment by 70%. Although Czechoslovakia's industrial growth of 170% between 1948–57 was huge, it was far exceeded by that of Japan (who increased by 300%) and West Germany (almost 300 percent) and more than equalled by Austria and Greece. For the 1954–59 period, France and Italy equalled Czechoslovak industrial growth.

Industrial growth in Czechoslovakia required substantial additional labour. Czechoslovaks were subjected to long hours and long working weeks to meet production quotas. Part-time, volunteer labour – students and white-collar workers – was drafted in massive numbers. Labour productivity, however, was not significantly increased; nor were production costs reduced. Czechoslovak products were characterised by poor quality. During the early years of Communist rule, many political prisoners were sentenced to penal labour.

The Ninth-of-May Constitution declared the government's intention to collectivise agriculture. In February 1949, the National Assembly adopted the Unified Agricultural Cooperatives Act. Cooperatives were to be founded on a voluntary basis; formal title to land was left vested in the original owners. The imposition of high compulsory quotas, however, forced peasants to collectivise in order to increase efficiency and facilitate mechanisation. Discriminatory policies were employed to bring about the ruin of recalcitrant kulaks (wealthy peasants). Collectivisation was near completion by 1960. 16% of all farmland (obtained from collaborators and kulaks) had been turned into state-run farms. Despite the elimination of poor land from cultivation and a tremendous increase in the use of fertilisers and tractors, agricultural production declined seriously. By 1959, pre-war production levels still had not been met. Major causes of the decline were the diversion of labour from agriculture to industry (in 1948 an estimated 2.2 million workers were employed in agriculture; by 1960, only 1.5 million); the suppression of the kulak, the most experienced and productive farmer; and the peasantry's opposition to collectivisation, which resulted in sabotage.

The 1960 Constitution of Czechoslovakia declared the victory of "socialism" and proclaimed the Czechoslovak Socialist Republic. The ambiguous precept of "democratic centralism" – power emanating from the people but bound by the authority of higher organs – was made a formal part of constitutional law. The President, the Cabinet, the Slovak National Council, and the local governments were made responsible to the National Assembly. The National Assembly, however, continued its rubber-stamp approval of KSČ policies. All private enterprises using hired labour were abolished. Comprehensive economic planning was reaffirmed. The Bill of Rights emphasised economic and social rights, (e.g the right to work, leisure, health care, and education), with less emphasis on civil rights. The judiciary was combined with the prosecuting branch; all judges were committed to the protection of the socialist state and the education of citizens in loyalty to the cause of socialism.

== De-Stalinization ==
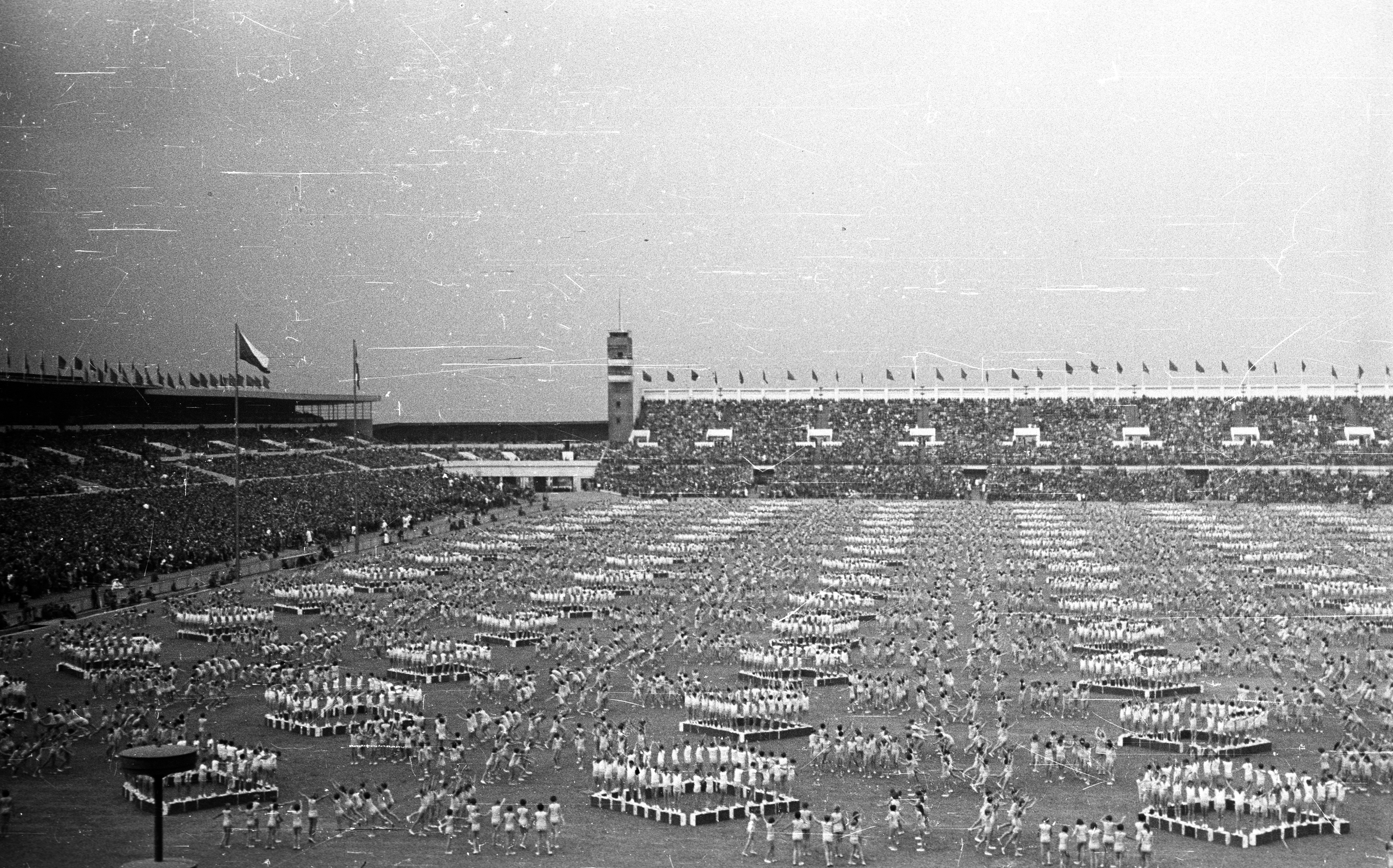
Spartakiad in 1965

De-Stalinization had a late start in Czechoslovakia. The KSČ leadership virtually ignored the Soviet law announced by Nikita Khrushchev on 25 February 1956 at the 20th Congress of the Communist Party of the Soviet Union. In Czechoslovakia that April, at the Second Writers' Congress, several authors criticized acts of political repression and attempted to gain control of the writers' congress. The writers' rebellion was suppressed, however, and the conservatives retained control. Students in Prague and Bratislava demonstrated on May Day of 1956, demanding freedom of speech and access to the Western press. The Novotný regime condemned these activities and introduced a policy of neo-Stalinism. After the Hungarian Revolution of October 1956 had been suppressed by Russian tanks and troops, many Czechs lost courage.

The 1958 KSČ Party Congress (XI. Congress, 18 June − 21 June) formalized the continuation of Stalinism.

In the early 1960s, the Economy of Czechoslovakia became severely stagnated. The industrial growth rate was the lowest in Eastern Europe. Food imports strained the balance of payments. Pressures both from Moscow and from within the party precipitated a reform movement. In 1963 reform-minded Communist intellectuals produced a proliferation of critical articles. Criticism of economic planning merged with more generalized protests against KSČ bureaucratic control and ideological conformity. The KSČ leadership responded. The purge trials of 1949–54 were reviewed, for example, and some of those purged were rehabilitated. Some hardliners were removed from top levels of government and replaced by younger, more liberal communists. Jozef Lenart replaced Prime Minister Viliam Široký in September 1963. The KSČ organized committees to review economic policy.

In 1965, the party approved the New Economic Model, which had been drafted under the direction of economist and theoretician Ota Šik. The program called for a second, intensive stage of economic development, emphasizing technological and managerial improvements. Central planning would be limited to overall production and investment indexes as well as price and wage guidelines. Management personnel would be involved in decision-making. Production would be market oriented and geared toward profitability. Prices would respond to supply and demand. Wage differentials would be introduced.

The KSČ "Theses" of December 1965 presented the party response to the call for political reform. Democratic centralism was redefined, placing a stronger emphasis on democracy. The leading role of the KSČ was reaffirmed but limited. In consequence, the National Assembly was promised increased legislative responsibility. The Slovak executive (Board of Commissioners) and legislature (Slovak National Council) were assured that they could assist the central government in program planning and assume responsibility for program implementation in Slovakia. The regional, district, and local national committees were to be permitted a degree of autonomy. The KSČ agreed to refrain from superseding the authority of economic and social organizations. Party control in cultural policy, however, was reaffirmed.

January 1967 was the date for full implementation of the reform program. Novotný and his supporters hesitated, introducing amendments to reinforce central control. Pressure from the reformists was stepped up. Slovaks pressed for federalization. Economists called for complete enterprise autonomy and economic responsiveness to the market mechanism. The Fourth Writers' Congress adopted a resolution calling for rehabilitation of the Czechoslovak literary tradition and the establishment of free contact with Western culture. The Novotný regime responded with repressive measures.

At the 30–31 October 1967 meeting of the KSČ Central Committee, Alexander Dubček, a Slovak reformer who had studied in the Soviet Union, challenged Novotný and was accused of nationalism. As university students in Prague demonstrated in support of the liberals, Novotný appealed to Moscow for assistance. On 8 December, Soviet leader Leonid Brezhnev arrived in Prague but did not support Novotný, giving a speech to the inner circle of the Communist Party in which he stated: "I did not come to take part in the solution of your problems... ...you will surely manage to solve them on your own." On 5 January 1968, the Central Committee elected Dubček to replace Novotný as first secretary of the KSČ. Novotný's fall from KSČ leadership precipitated initiatives to oust Stalinists from all levels of government, from mass associations, e.g., the Revolutionary Trade Union Movement and the Czechoslovak Union Youth, and from local party organs. On 22 March 1968, Novotný resigned from the presidency and was succeeded by General Ludvík Svoboda.

== Prague Spring ==
Dubček carried the reform movement a step further in the direction of liberalism. After Novotný's fall, censorship was lifted. The media—press, radio, and television—were mobilized for reformist propaganda purposes. The movement to democratize socialism in Czechoslovakia, formerly confined largely to the party intelligentsia, acquired a new, popular dynamism in the spring of 1968. In April the KSČ Presidium adopted the Action Programme that had been drafted by a coalition headed by Dubček and made up of reformers, moderates, centrists, and conservatives. The program proposed a "new model of socialism," profoundly "democratic" and "national," that is, adapted to Czechoslovak conditions. The National Front and the electoral system were to be democratized, and Czechoslovakia was to be federalized. Freedom of assembly and expression would be guaranteed in constitutional law. The New Economic Model was to be implemented. The Action Program also reaffirmed the Czechoslovak alliance with the Soviet Union and other socialist states. The reform movement, which rejected Stalinism as the road to communism, remained committed to communism as a goal.

The Action Program stipulated that reform must proceed under KSČ direction. In subsequent months, however, popular pressure mounted to implement reforms forthwith. Radical elements found expression: anti-Soviet polemics appeared in the press; the Social Democrats began to form a separate party; new unaffiliated political clubs were created. Party conservatives urged the implementation of repressive measures, but Dubček counselled moderation and reemphasized KSČ leadership. In May he announced that the Fourteenth Party Congress would convene in an early session on 9 September. The congress would incorporate the Action Program into the party statutes, draft a federalization law, and elect a new (presumably more liberal) Central Committee.

On 27 June, Ludvík Vaculík, a lifelong communist and a candidate member of the Central Committee, published a manifesto entitled the "Two Thousand Words". The manifesto expressed concern about conservative elements within the KSČ and "foreign" forces as well. (Warsaw Pact maneuvers were held in Czechoslovakia in late June.) It called on the "people" to take the initiative in implementing the reform program. Dubček, the party Presidium, the National Front, and the cabinet sharply denounced the manifesto.

The Soviet leadership was alarmed. In mid-July a Warsaw Pact conference was held without Czechoslovak participation. The Warsaw Pact nations drafted a letter to the KSČ leadership referring to the manifesto as an "organizational and political platform of counterrevolution." Pact members demanded the reimposition of censorship, the banning of new political parties and clubs, and the repression of "rightist" forces within the party. The Warsaw Pact nations declared the defence of Czechoslovakia's socialist gains to be not only the task of Czechoslovakia but also the mutual task of all Warsaw Pact countries. The KSČ rejected the Warsaw Pact ultimatum, and Dubček requested bilateral talks with the Soviet Union.

Soviet leader Brezhnev hesitated to intervene militarily in Czechoslovakia. Dubček's Action Program proposed a "new model of socialism"—"democratic" and "national." Significantly, however, Dubček did not challenge Czechoslovak commitment to the Warsaw Pact. In the early spring of 1968, the Soviet leadership adopted a wait-and-see attitude. By midsummer, however, two camps had formed: advocates and opponents of military intervention. The pro-interventionist coalition viewed the situation in Czechoslovakia as "counterrevolutionary" and favoured the defeat of Dubček and his supporters. This coalition was headed by the Ukrainian party leader Petro Shelest and included communist bureaucrats from Belarus and from the non-Russian national republics of the western part of the Soviet Union (the Baltic republics). The coalition members feared the awakening of nationalism within their respective republics and the influence of the Ukrainian minority in Czechoslovakia on Ukrainians in the Soviet Union. Bureaucrats responsible for political stability in Soviet cities and for the ideological supervision of the intellectual community also favoured a military solution. Within the Warsaw Pact, only the German Democratic Republic (East Germany) and Poland were strongly interventionist. Walter Ulbricht and Władysław Gomułka—party leaders of East Germany and Poland, respectively—viewed liberalism as threatening to their own positions.

The Soviet Union agreed to bilateral talks with Czechoslovakia to be held in July at Cierna nad Tisou, Slovak-Soviet border. At the meeting, Dubček defended the program of the reformist wing of the KSČ while pledging commitment to the Warsaw Pact and Comecon. The KSČ leadership, however, was divided. Vigorous reformers—Josef Smrkovský, Oldřich Černík, and František Kriegel—supported Dubček. Conservatives—Vasil Biľak, Drahomír Kolder, and Oldřich Švestka—adopted an anti-reformist stance. Brezhnev decided on compromise. The KSČ delegates reaffirmed their loyalty to the Warsaw Pact and promised to curb "antisocialist" tendencies, prevent the revival of the Czechoslovak Social Democratic Party, and control the press more effectively. The Soviets agreed to withdraw their troops (stationed in Czechoslovakia since the June maneuvers) and permit the 9 September party congress.

On 3 August, representatives from the Soviet Union, East Germany, Poland, Hungary, Bulgaria, and Czechoslovakia met in Bratislava and signed the Bratislava Declaration. The declaration affirmed unshakable fidelity to Marxism-Leninism and proletarian internationalism and declared an implacable struggle against "bourgeois" ideology and all "antisocialist" forces. The Soviet Union expressed its intention to intervene in a Warsaw Pact country if a "bourgeois" system—a pluralist system of several political parties—was ever established. After the Bratislava conference, Soviet troops left Czechoslovak territory but remained along Czechoslovak borders. Dubček did not attempt to mobilize the Czechoslovak army to resist an invasion.

The KSČ party congress remained scheduled for 9 September. In the week following the Bratislava conference, it became an open secret in Prague that most of Dubček's opponents would be removed from the Central Committee. The Prague municipal party organization prepared and circulated a blacklist. The antireformist coalition could hope to stay in power only with Soviet assistance.

KSČ anti-reformists, therefore, made efforts to convince the Soviets that the danger of political instability and "counterrevolution" did indeed exist. They used the Kaspar Report, prepared by the Central Committee's Information Department, headed by Jan Kašpar, to achieve this end. The report provided an extensive review of the general political situation in Czechoslovakia as it might relate to the forthcoming party congress. It predicted that a stable Central Committee and a firm leadership could not necessarily be expected as the outcome of the congress. The party Presidium received the report on 12 August. Two Presidium members, Kolder and Alois Indra, were instructed to evaluate the report for the 20 August meeting of the Presidium. Kolder and Indra viewed the Kašpar Report with alarm and, some observers think, communicated their conclusions to the Soviet ambassador, Stepan Chervonenko. These actions are thought to have precipitated the Warsaw Pact invasion of Czechoslovakia. As the KSČ Presidium convened on 20 August, the anti-reformists planned to make a bid for power, pointing to the imminent danger of counterrevolution. Kolder and Indra presented a resolution declaring a state of emergency and calling for "fraternal assistance." The resolution was never voted on, because the Warsaw Pact troops entered Czechoslovakia that same day (in the night of 20 August-21).

=== Warsaw Pact intervention and the end of Prague Spring ===
KSČ conservatives had misinformed Moscow regarding the strength of the reform movement. The KSČ Presidium met during the night of 20–21 August; it rejected the option of armed resistance and condemned the invasion. Two-thirds of the KSČ Central Committee opposed the Soviet intervention. A KSČ party congress, convened secretly on 22 August, passed a resolution affirming its loyalty to Dubček's Action Program and denouncing the Soviet aggression. President Svoboda repeatedly resisted Soviet pressure to form a new government under Indra. The Czechoslovak population was virtually unanimous in its repudiation of the Soviet action. In compliance with Svoboda's caution against acts that might provoke violence, they avoided mass demonstrations and strikes but observed a symbolic one-hour general work stoppage on 23 August.

Popular opposition was expressed in numerous spontaneous acts of nonviolent resistance, also called civil resistance. In Prague and other cities throughout the republic, Czechs and Slovaks greeted Warsaw Pact soldiers with arguments and reproaches. Every form of assistance, including the provision of food and water, was denied the invaders. Signs, placards, and graffiti drawn on walls and pavements denounced the invaders, the Soviet leaders, and suspected collaborators. Pictures of Dubček and Svoboda appeared everywhere.

The generalized resistance caused the Soviet Union to abandon its original plan to oust Dubček. Dubček, who had been arrested on the night of 20 August, was taken to Moscow for negotiations. The outcome was the Brezhnev Doctrine of limited sovereignty, which provided for the strengthening of the KSČ, strict party control of the media, and the suppression of the Czechoslovak Social Democratic Party. It was agreed that Dubček would remain in office and that a program of moderate reform would continue.

On 19 January 1969, student Jan Palach set himself on fire in Prague's Wenceslas Square as a protest against the end of the reforms of the Prague Spring following the Soviet invasion.

== Normalization ==
Dubček remained in office only until April 1969. Anti-Soviet demonstrations, following Czechoslovakia's victory over the Soviet team in the World Ice Hockey Championships in March, precipitated Soviet pressures for a KSČ Presidium reorganization. Gustáv Husák, (a centrist and one of the Slovak "bourgeois nationalists" imprisoned by the KSČ in the 1950s), was named first secretary (title changed to general secretary in 1971). Only centrists and the hardliners led by Vasil Bilak continued in the Presidium.

A program of "normalization"—the restoration of continuity with the prereform period—was initiated. Normalization entailed thoroughgoing political repression and the return to ideological conformity

- consolidate the Husák leadership and remove reformers from leadership positions;
- revoke or modify the laws enacted by the reform movement;
- reestablish centralized control over the economy;
- reinstate the power of police authorities; and
- expand Czechoslovakia's ties with other socialist nations.

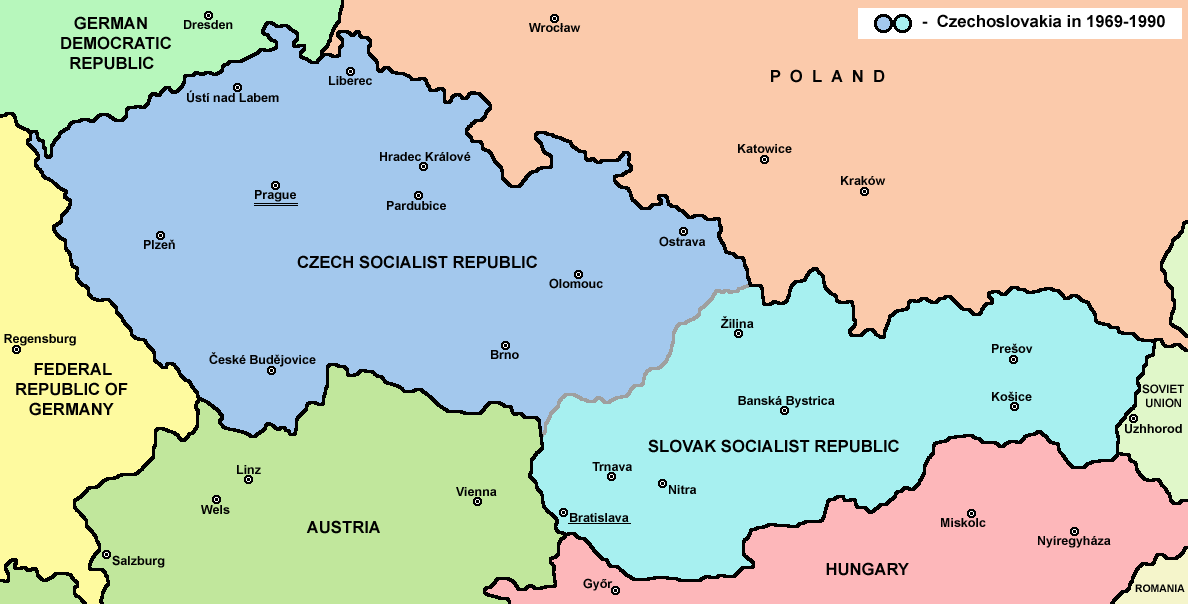
Czechoslovakia in 1969

One of the few changes proposed by the Action Programme during the Prague Spring that was actually achieved was the federalization of the country. Although it was mostly a formality during the normalization period, Czechoslovakia had been federalized under the Constitutional Law of Federation of 27 October 1968. The newly created Federal Assembly (i.e., federal parliament), which replaced the National Assembly, was intended to work in close cooperation with the Czech National Council and the Slovak National Council (i.e., national parliaments). The Gustáv Husák regime amended the law in January 1971 so that, while federalism was retained in form, central authority was effectively restored. In the meantime, a Slovak parliament and government had been created, including all ministries except for defence and foreign affairs. Besides, a so-called no-majorisation principle requiring consensus between Czechia and Slovakia at the Federal Assembly in Prague was enacted. But due to the fact that neither governments nor parliaments made political decisions under the regime, it remained just a formality. Decisions were taken "by the politburo of the Communist Party of Czechoslovakia. There was one communist party and it was situated in Prague". Deciding about Slovak affairs in Slovakia was not allowed to happen.

At the official Fourteenth Party Congress in May 1971, party chief Husák announced the 1968 Fourteenth Party Congress had been abrogated, that "normalization" had been "completed" and that all the party needed to do was consolidate its gains. Husák's policy was to maintain a rigid status quo; for the next fifteen years, key personnel of the party and government remained the same. In 1975, Husák added the position of president to his post as party chief. He and other party leaders faced the task of rebuilding general party membership after the purges of 1969–71. By 1983, membership had returned to 1.6 million, about the same as in 1960.

In preserving the status quo, the Husák regime required conformity and obedience in all aspects of life. Czech and Slovak culture suffered greatly from the limitations on independent thought, as did the humanities, social sciences, and ultimately even natural sciences. Art had to adhere to a rigid formula of socialist realism. Soviet examples were held up for emulation. During the 1970s and 1980s, many of Czechoslovakia's most creative individuals were silenced, imprisoned, or sent into exile. Some found expression for their art through samizdat. Those artists, poets, and writers who were officially sanctioned were, for the most part, undistinguished. The award of the Nobel Prize for Literature in 1984 to Jaroslav Seifert—a poet identified with reformism and not favored by the Husák regime—was a bright spot in an otherwise bleak cultural scene.

In addition to applying repression, Husák also tried to obtain acquiescence to his rule by providing an improved standard of living. He returned Czechoslovakia to an orthodox command economy with a heavy emphasis on central planning and continued to extend industrialization. For a while, the policy seemed successful because, despite the lack of investment in new technologies, there was an increase in industrial output. The government encouraged consumerism and materialism and took a tolerant attitude toward a slack work ethic and a growing black market second economy:

- In the early 1970s, there was a steady increase in the standard of living; it seemed that the improved economy might mitigate political and cultural oppression and give the government a modicum of legitimacy.
- By the mid-1970s, consumerism failed as a palliative for political oppression. The government could not sustain an indefinite expansion without coming to grips with limitations inherent in a command economy. The effects of the 1973 oil crisis further exacerbated the economic decline. Materialism, encouraged by a corrupt government, also produced cynicism, greed, nepotism, corruption, and a lack of work discipline. Whatever elements of a social contract the government tried to establish with Czechoslovak society crumbled with the decline in living standards of the mid-1970s.
- The 1980s were more or less a period of economic stagnation.

Another feature of Husák's rule was a continued dependence on the Soviet Union. As of the mid-1980s, Husák had not yet achieved a balance between what could be perceived as Czechoslovak national interest and Soviet dictate. In foreign policy, Czechoslovakia parroted every utterance of the Soviet position. Frequent contacts between the Soviet and Czechoslovak communist parties and governments made certain that the Soviet position on any issue was both understood and followed. The Soviets continued to exert control over Czechoslovak internal affairs, including oversight over the police and security apparatus. Five Soviet ground divisions and two air divisions had become a permanent fixture, while the Czechoslovak military was further integrated into the Warsaw Pact. In the 1980s, approximately 50% of Czechoslovakia's foreign trade was with the Soviet Union, and almost 80% was with communist countries. There were constant exhortations about further cooperation and integration between the Soviet Union and Czechoslovakia in industry, science, technology, consumer goods, and agriculture. Deriving its legitimacy from Moscow, the Husák regime remained a slavish imitator of political, cultural, and economic trends emanating from Moscow.

== Dissent and independent activity (1970s and 1980s) ==
Through the 1970s and 1980s, the government's emphasis on obedience, conformity, and the preservation of the status quo was challenged by individuals and organized groups aspiring to independent thinking and activity. Although only a few such activities could be deemed political by Western standards, the state viewed any independent action, no matter how innocuous, as a defiance of the party's control over all aspects of Czechoslovak life. The government's response to such activity was harassment, persecution, and, in some instances, imprisonment.

In the context of international detente, Czechoslovakia had signed the United Nations Covenant on Economic, Social, and Cultural Rights and the Covenant on Civil and Political Rights in 1968. In 1975 these were ratified by the Federal Assembly, which, according to the Constitution of 1960, is the highest legislative organization. The Helsinki Conference on Security and Cooperation in Europe's Final Act (also known as the Helsinki Accords), signed by Czechoslovakia in 1975, also included guarantees of human rights.

The first organized opposition emerged under the umbrella of Charter 77. On 6 January 1977, a manifesto called Charter 77 appeared in West German newspapers. The document was immediately translated and reprinted throughout the world. The original manifesto reportedly was signed by 243 people; among them were artists, former public officials, and other prominent figures, such as Zdeněk Mlynář, secretary of the KSČ Central Committee in 1968; Václav Slavík, a Central Committee member in 1968; and Ludvík Vaculík, author of "Two Thousand Words." Charter 77 defined itself as "a loose, informal, and open community of people" concerned with the protection of civil and human rights. It denied oppositional intent and based its defense of rights on legally binding international documents signed by the Czechoslovak government and on guarantees of civil rights contained in the Czechoslovak Constitution. The Charter 77 group declared its objectives to be the following: to draw attention to individual cases of human rights infringements; to suggest remedies; to make general proposals to strengthen rights and freedoms and the mechanisms designed to protect them; and to act as intermediary in situations of conflict. The Charter had over 800 signatures by the end of 1977, including workers and youth; by 1985 nearly 1,200 Czechoslovaks had signed the Charter. The Husák regime, which claimed that all rights derive from the state and that international covenants are subject to the internal jurisdiction of the state, responded with fury to the Charter. The text was never published in the official media. Signatories were arrested and interrogated; dismissal from employment often followed. The Czechoslovak press launched vicious attacks against the Charter. The public was mobilized to sign either individual condemnations or various forms of "anti-Charters."

Closely associated with Charter 77, the Committee for the Defense of the Unjustly Persecuted (Výbor na obranu nespravedlivě stíhaných—VONS) was formed in 1978 with the specific goal of documenting individual cases of government persecution and human rights violations. Between 1978 and 1984, VONS issued 409 communiques concerning individuals prosecuted or harassed.

On a larger scale, independent activity was expressed through underground writing and publishing. Because of the decentralized nature of underground writing, it is difficult to estimate its extent or impact. Hundreds of books, journals, essays, and short stories were published and distributed. In the mid-1980s, several samizdat publishing houses were in operation. The best known was Edice Petlice (Padlock Editions), which had published more than 250 volumes. There were a number of clandestine religious publishing houses that published journals in photocopy or printed form. The production and distribution of underground literature was difficult. In most cases, manuscripts had to be typed and retyped without the aid of modern publishing equipment. Publication and distribution were also dangerous. Mere possession of samizdat materials could be the basis for harassment, loss of employment, and arrest and imprisonment.

Independent activity also extended to music. The state was particularly concerned about the impact of Western popular music on Czechoslovak youth. The persecution of rock musicians and their fans led a number of musicians to sign Charter 77. In the forefront of the struggle for independent music was the Jazz Section of the Union of Musicians. Initially organized to promote jazz, in the late 1970s it became a protector of various kinds of nonconformist music. The widely popular Jazz Section had a membership of approximately 7,000 and received no official funds. It published music and promoted concerts and festivals. The government condemned the Jazz Section for spreading "unacceptable views" among the youth and moved against its leadership. In March 1985, the Jazz Section was dissolved under a 1968 statute banning "counterrevolutionary activities." The Jazz Section continued to operate, however, and in 1986 the government arrested the members of its steering committee.

Because religion offered possibilities for thought and activities independent of the state, it too was severely restricted and controlled. Clergymen were required to be licensed. In attempting to manipulate the number and kind of clergy, the state even sponsored a pro-government organization of Catholic priests, the Association of Catholic Clergy Pacem in Terris. Nevertheless, there was religious opposition, including a lively Catholic samizdat. In the 1980s, Cardinal František Tomášek, the Czech primate, adopted a more independent stand. In 1984 he invited the Pope to come to Czechoslovakia for the 1,100th anniversary of the death of Saint Methodius, the missionary to the Slavs. The pope accepted, but the trip was blocked by the government. The cardinal's invitation and the pope's acceptance were widely circulated in samizdat. A petition requesting the government to permit the papal visit had 17,000 signatories. The Catholic Church did have a massive commemoration of the 1,100th anniversary in 1985. At Velehrad (allegedly the site of Methodius's tomb) more than 150,000 pilgrims attended a commemorative mass, and another 100,000 came to a ceremony at Levoca (in eastern Slovakia).

Unlike in Poland, dissent, opposition to the government, and independent activity were limited in Czechoslovakia to a fairly small segment of the populace. Even the dissenters saw scant prospect for fundamental reforms. In this sense, the Husák regime was successful in preserving the status quo in "normalized" Czechoslovakia.

The selection of Mikhail Gorbachev as general secretary of the Communist Party of the Soviet Union on 11 March 1985, presented the Husák regime with a new and unexpected challenge to the status quo. Soon after assuming office, Gorbachev began a policy of perestroika ("restructuring") the Soviet economy and advocated glasnost ("openness") in the discussion of economic, social, and, to some extent, political questions. Up to this time, the Husák regime had dutifully adopted the programs and slogans that had emanated from Moscow. But, for a government wholly dedicated to the preservation of the status quo, subjects such as "openness," economic "restructuring," and "reform" had been taboo.

== See also ==
- Operation Neptune (Espionage)

== Bibliography ==
- Bradley F. Abrams, The Struggle for the Soul of the Nation: Czech Culture and the Rise of Communism (Lanham, MD, Rowman & Littlefield, 2004) (The Harvard Cold War Studies Book Series).
- Stefan Karner et al. (eds.), Prager Frühling. Das internationale Krisenjahr 1968, 2 Bde. (Köln / Weimar / Wien: Böhlau 2008) (Veröffentlichungen des Ludwig-Boltzmann-Instituts für Kriegsfolgen-Forschung, Graz – Wien – Klagenfurt; Sonderband 9/1, 9/2).
- Pucci, M. (2020). Security Empire: The Secret Police in Communist Eastern Europe (Yale-Hoover Series on Authoritarian Regimes). New Haven: Yale University Press.
