= Communist Party of Czechoslovakia =

Ruling party of Czechoslovakia (1948–1989)

Communist Party of Czechoslovakia Komunistická strana Československa
- General Secretary: Václav Šturc (first); Ladislav Adamec (last)
- Founded: 16 May 1921
- Dissolved: 23 April 1992
- Split from: Czechoslovak Social Democratic Workers' Party
- Succeeded by: Communist Party of Bohemia and Moravia (Czech Republic); Party of the Democratic Left (Slovakia)
- Headquarters: Central Committee, Prague, Czechoslovakia
- Newspaper: Rudé právo Pravda; Munkás
- Youth wing: Young Communist League of Czechoslovakia (1921–1936); Czechoslovak Youth Union (1949–1968); Socialist Youth Union (1970–1989)
- Paramilitary wing: People's Militias
- Ideology: Communism; Marxism–Leninism
- National affiliation: National Front (1945–1990)
- International affiliation: Comintern (1921–1943); Cominform (1947–1956)
- Colours: Red

Party flag

The Communist Party of Czechoslovakia (Czech and Slovak: Komunistická strana Československa, KSČ) was a communist and Marxist–Leninist political party in Czechoslovakia that existed between 1921 and 1992. It was a member of the Comintern. Between 1929 and 1953, it was led by Klement Gottwald. The KSČ was the sole governing party in the Czechoslovak Socialist Republic though it was a leading party along with the Slovak branch and four other legally permitted non-communist parties. After its election victory in 1946, it seized power in the 1948 Czechoslovak coup d'état and established a one-party state allied with the Soviet Union. Nationalization of virtually all private enterprises followed, and a planned economy was implemented.

The KSČ was committed to the pursuit of communism, and after Joseph Stalin's rise to power Marxism–Leninism became formalized as the party's guiding ideology and would remain so throughout the rest of its existence. Consequently, party organisation was based on Bolshevik-like democratic centralism; its highest body was the Party Congress, which convened every five years. When the Congress was not in session, the Central Committee was the highest body. Because the Central Committee met twice a year, most day-to-day duties and responsibilities were vested in the Politburo. The party leader was the head of government and held the office of either General Secretary, Premier or head of state, or some of the three offices concurrently, but never all three at the same time.

In 1968, party leader Alexander Dubček proposed reforms that included a democratic process and initiated the Prague Spring, leading to the invasion of Czechoslovakia by the Soviet Union. Under pressure from the Kremlin, all reforms were repealed, party leadership became taken over by its more authoritarian wing, and a massive non-bloody purge of party members was conducted. In 1989, however, the party leadership bowed to popular pressure during the Velvet Revolution and agreed to call the first contested election since 1946, leading to the victory of the centre-based Civic Forum in the 1990 election and the KSČ stepping down. That November, the party became a federation of the Communist Party of Bohemia and Moravia and the Communist Party of Slovakia. It was then declared to be a criminal organisation in the Czech Republic by the 1993 Act on Illegality of the Communist Regime and on Resistance Against It.

== History ==
=== 1921–1945 ===
The Communist Party of Czechoslovakia was founded at the congress of the Czechoslovak Social-Democratic Party (Left), held in Prague May 14–16, 1921. Rudé právo, previously the organ of the Left Social-Democrats, became the main organ of the new party. As a first chairman was elected Václav Šturc, first vice-chairman was Bohumír Šmeral and second vice-chairman was Vaclav Bolen. The party was one of some twenty political parties that competed within the democratic framework of the First Czechoslovak Republic, but it was never in government. In 1925 parliamentary election the party gained 934,223 votes (13.2%, 2nd place) and 41 seats.

The party was the Czechoslovak section of the Communist International. As of 1928, the party was the second-largest section of the International, with an estimated membership of around 138,000, more than twice the membership of the French Communist Party and nearly five times the membership of the Chinese Communist Party at the time.

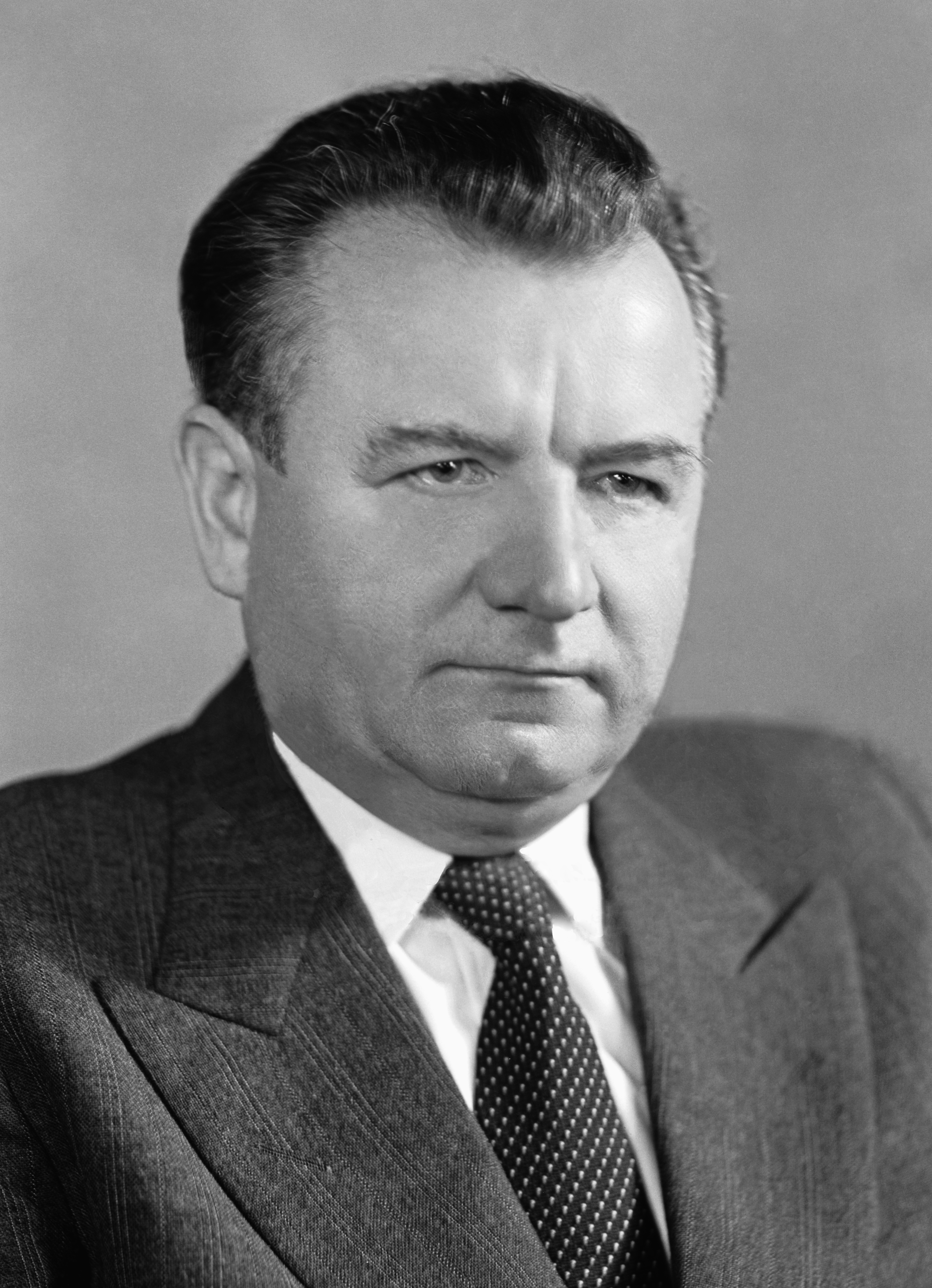
Klement Gottwald, leader of the party from 1929 until his death in 1953

In 1929 Klement Gottwald became party Secretary-General after the purging from it of various oppositional elements some of whom allied themselves to Trotsky and the International Left Opposition. In 1929 parliamentary election the party gained 753,220 votes (10.2%, 4th place) and 30 seats. In 1935 parliamentary election the party held its 30 seats with 849,495 votes (10.3%, 4th place).

The party was banned on 20 October 1938 during the Second Republic, but continued to exist as an underground organisation. Following the signing of the Molotov–Ribbentrop Pact, anti-German protests broke out in Prague in October 1939. In response, the Comintern ordered the party to oppose the protests, which they blamed on "chauvinist elements".

During World War II many KSČ leaders sought refuge in the Soviet Union, where they prepared to broaden the party's power base once the war ended. In the early postwar period the Soviet-supported Czechoslovak communists launched a sustained drive that culminated in their seizure of power in 1948. Once in control, KSČ developed an organizational structure and mode of rule patterned closely after those of CPSU.

=== 1945–1969 ===
The Communist Party of Czechoslovakia was in a coalition government from 1945 to 1948. After the war the party grew rapidly, reaching one million members by the time of the 1946 elections: at these elections it became the largest party in Parliament, and party chairman Klement Gottwald became prime minister in a free election.

Following the Communist coup d'état of 1948, when free elections and other political freedoms were effectively abolished, power was formally held by the National Front, a coalition in which the KSČ held two-thirds of the seats while the remaining one-third were shared among five other political parties. However, KSČ held a de facto absolute monopoly on political power, and the other parties within the National Front were little more than auxiliaries. Even the governmental structure of Czechoslovakia existed primarily to implement policy decisions made within the KSČ.

A dispute broke out between Gottwald and the second most-powerful man in the country, party General Secretary Rudolf Slánský, over the extent to which Czechoslovakia should conform with the Soviet model. In 1951, Slánský and several other senior Communists were arrested and charged with participating in a "Trotskyite–Titoite–Zionist conspiracy". They were subjected to a show trial in 1952 (the Prague Trials) and Slánský and 10 other defendants were executed.

In the early 1960s, Czechoslovakia underwent an economic downturn, and in 1968, the KSČ was taken over by reformers led by Alexander Dubček. He started a period of liberalization known as the Prague Spring in which he attempted to implement "socialism with a human face".

The Soviet Union believed the process of liberalization would end state socialism in the country and on 21 August 1968, Warsaw Pact forces invaded. Subsequently, the Soviet justification for the invasion would become known as the Brezhnev Doctrine.

=== 1969–1992 ===
In April 1969, Dubček was removed as party General Secretary (replaced by Gustáv Husák) and expelled in 1970. During the period of normalization that followed, the party was dominated by two factions: moderates and hardliners.

==== Moderates and pragmatists ====
Moderates and pragmatists were represented by Gustáv Husák who led the neo-stalinist wing of KSČ leadership. As a moderate or pragmatic, he was pressed by hardliners, most notably Vasil Biľak. An important Slovak Communist Party functionary from 1943 to 1950, Husák was arrested in 1951 and sentenced to three years, later increased to life imprisonment, for "bourgeois nationalism" during the Stalinist purges of the era. Released in 1960 and rehabilitated in 1963, Husák refused any political position in Antonín Novotný's régime but after Novotný's fall he became deputy prime minister during the Prague Spring. After Dubček's resignation Husák was named KSČ First Secretary in April 1969 and president of the republic in July 1975. Above all, Husák was a survivor who learned to accommodate the powerful political forces surrounding him and he denounced Dubček after 1969.

Other prominent moderates/pragmatics who were still in power by 1987 included:

- Lubomír Štrougal, Premier of Czechoslovakia;
- Peter Colotka, Premier of the Slovak Socialist Republic;
- Jozef Lenárt, First Secretary of the KSS;
- Josef Kempný, Chairman of the Czech National Council.

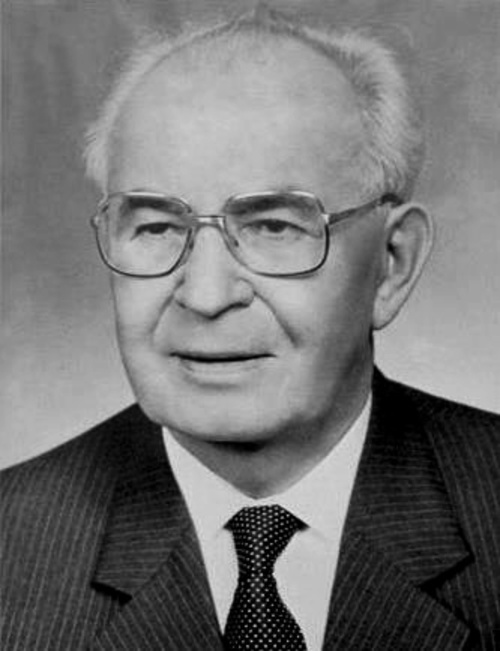
Gustáv Husák, leader of the party between 1969–87 and president of Czechoslovakia in 1975–89

These leaders generally supported the reforms instituted under Dubček during the late 1960s but successfully made the transition to orthodox party rule following the invasion and Dubček's decline from power. Subsequently, they adopted a more flexible stance regarding economic reform and dissident activity.

==== Hardliners ====
Key members of this faction included:

- Vasiľ Biľak, their leader, had been a member of the Presidium since 1968 and was chairman of the party's Ideological Commission
- Karel Hoffman, a Central Committee Secretary and Presidium member;
- Antonín Kapek, Presidium member;
- Jan Fojtík, Secretary;
- Alois Indra, Presidium member and Chairman of the Federal Assembly (replaced the National Assembly under 1968 federation law); and
- Miloš Jakeš, Chairman of the Central Supervisory and Auditing Commission and Presidium member (replaced Gustáv Husák as the Party's General Secretary in 1987).

These hardliners opposed economic and political reforms and took a harsh stand on dissent.

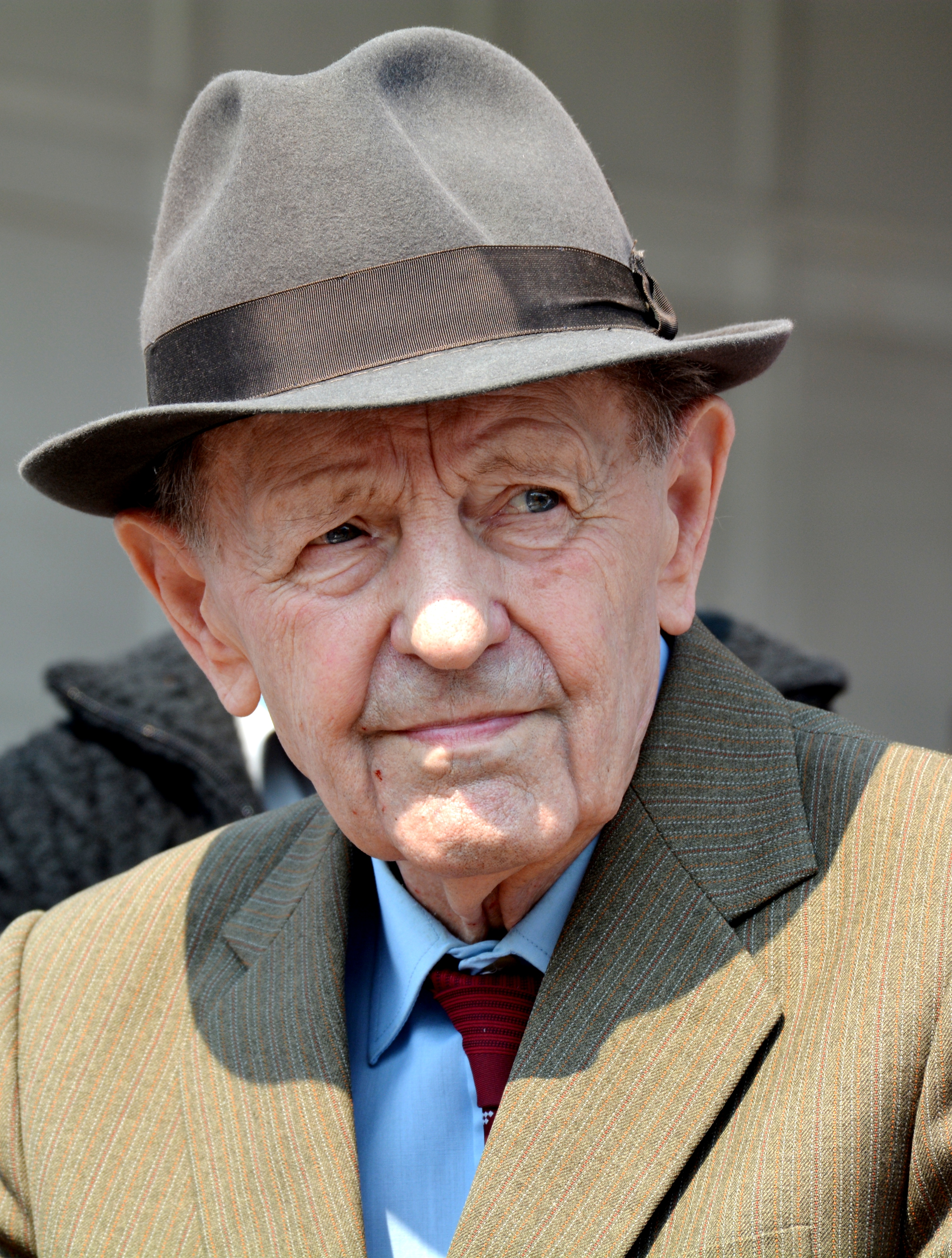
Milos Jakeš, the last communist leader (1987–89)

The party's hegemony ended with the Velvet Revolution in 1989. In November, Jakeš and the entire Presidium resigned. Jakeš was succeeded by Karel Urbanek, who only held power for about a month before the party formally abandoned power in December. Later that month, Husák, who retained the presidency after standing down as general secretary, was forced to swear in the country's first non-Communist government in 41 years.

==== Federal party and dissolution ====
At the 18th party congress held November 3–4, 1990, the party was rebaptized as KSČS and became a federation of two parties: the Communist Party of Bohemia and Moravia (KSČM) and the Communist Party of Slovakia (KSS). Pavol Kanis served as the chairman of the Federal Council of KSČS. However, the two constituent organizations of the federal party were moving in different directions politically and there was great tension between them. KSS, the Slovak constituent party of KSČS, was renamed as Party of the Democratic Left (SDL) on January 26, 1991. Whilst no longer a communist party per se, SDL formally remained as the Slovak constituent party of KSČS.

In August 1991, upon the request of SDL, the party mutated into the Federation of the Communist Party of Bohemia and Moravia and the Party of the Democratic Left (Federácie KSČM a SDĽ). KSČM unsuccessfully appealed to two Slovak communist splinter parties, the Communist Party of Slovakia – 91 (KSS '91) and the Union of Communists of Slovakia (ZKS), to join the Federation. At the first SDL congress in December 1991, SDL formally withdrew from the Federation with the KSČM. The Federation was formally declared dissolved in April 1992.

=== Claimed reformation ===
On 10 March 1995 a party named Communist Party of Czechoslovakia was registered as a political party in the Czech Republic and on the 22 April 1995 Miroslav Štěpán was elected its General Secretary. The party claimed to be the heir to KSČ and rejected the claims of KSČM on the basis of their revisionist positions. The majority of remaining communists rejected their claim to represent the old party and continued their political career as members of KSČM. In 1999 the party changed its name to The Party of Czech Communists (SČK).

In 2001 the party underwent its first split, when a part of it split off to form the Communist Party of Czechoslovakia – Czechoslovak Labour Party (KSČ-ČSSP) led by Ludvík Zifčák, a former member of the National Police, who infiltrated the student protesters during the Velvet Revolution. The false story that a student named Martin Šmíd was killed by the state police was likely aided by the demonstrators confusing memories of him with a dead body of a student, because he was accidentally struck by his colleagues and blacked out.

After Štěpán died in 2014 and was replaced as General Secretary by Jiří Vábr, the party had another split. Vojtěch Mišičák accused the party of passivity and broke off a new group called the Czech Communist Party 21 (KSČ21), whose current general secretary is Zdeněk Klímek.

None of these parties ever had any electoral successes on the rare occasion they even ran candidates. Štěpán was a candidate in the 1996 and 1998 Czech Senate election for Bruntál. In 1996 he came fifth with 627 votes and the KSČM candidate Rostislav Harazin came 3rd with 5 294 votes. In 1998 he came seventh with 716 votes and Harazin won with 7 852 votes in the first round and 10 154 in the second.

== Organisation ==
=== National ===
KSČ organization was based on the Leninist concept of democratic centralism, which provided for the election of party leaders at all levels but required that each level be fully subject to the control of the next higher unit. Accordingly, party programs and policies were directed from the top, and resolutions of higher organs were unconditionally binding on all lower organs and individual party members. In theory, policy matters were freely and openly discussed at congresses, conferences, membership meetings, and in the party press. In practice, however, these discussions merely reflected decisions made by a small contingent of top party officials.

The supreme KSČ organ was the party congress, which normally convened every five years for a session lasting less than one week. An exception was made with respect to the 14th Party Congress, which was held in August 1968 under Dubček's leadership. Held in semi-secrecy in a tractor factory in the opening days of the Soviet occupation, this congress denounced the invasion, and was later declared illegal, its proceedings stricken from party records, and a second, "legal" 14th Party Congress held in May 1971. Subsequent numbered congresses were held in April 1976, April 1981 and March 1986. Party congress theoretically was responsible for making basic policy decisions; in practice, however, it was the Presidium of the Central Committee that held the decision-making and policy-making responsibilities. The congress merely endorsed the reports and directives of the top party leadership. The statutory duties assigned the party congress included determination of the party's domestic and foreign policies; approval of the party program and statutes; and election of the Central Committee and the Central Supervisory and Auditing Commission, as well as discussion and approval of their reports.

Between congresses, KSČ's Central Committee (CC) was responsible for directing party activities and implementing general policy decisions. Party statutes also provided that CC functioned as the primary arm of KSČ control over the organs of federal government and the republics, National Front, and all cultural and professional organizations. Party members holding leading positions in these bodies were responsible directly to CC for the implementation of KSČ policies. In addition, CC screened nominations for all important government and party positions and selected the editor-in-chief of Rudé právo, the principal party newspaper. CC generally met in full session at least twice a year. In 1976, CC had 115 members and 45 candidates; in 1986, these figures were 135 and 62, respectively. In terms of composition, CC normally included leading party and government officials, military officials, and some celebrities.

CC, like the party congress, rarely acted as more than a rubber stamp of policy decisions made by KSČ's Presidium, except when factional infighting developed within the Presidium in 1968 and CC assumed crucial importance in resolving the dispute to oust First Secretary Novotný in favour of Dubček. Generally, decisions on which CC voted were reached beforehand so that votes taken at the sessions were unanimous. The Presidium, which conducted party work between full committee sessions, formally was elected by the CC; in reality, top party leaders determined its composition. In 1986, there were 11 full members and 6 candidate members.

CC's Secretariat acted as the party's highest administrative authority and as the nerve centre of the party's extensive control mechanism. The Secretariat supervised implementation of decisions made in the Presidium, controlled any movement up and down the party ladder, and directed work within the party and government apparatus. Under Husák, composition of the Secretariat, like that of the Presidium, remained rather constant. Many secretaries were also members of the Presidium.

The Central Supervisory and Auditing Commission played a dual role, overseeing party discipline and supervising party finances, but it did not control anything. As an organ for enforcement of party standards, Central Supervisory and Auditing Commission frequently wielded its power to suspend or expel "deviant" party members. It was this commission that directed the massive purges in party membership during the early and late 1970s. Members were elected at each party congress (45 members in 1986). These members then elected from among themselves a chairman, deputy chairmen, and a small presidium. Sub-units of the commission existed at the republic, regional and district levels of the party structure.

Other KSČ commissions in 1987 included People's Supervisory Commission, Agriculture and Food Commission, Economic Commission, Ideological Commission, and Youth Commission.

In 1987 the party also had 18 departments (agitation and propaganda; agriculture, food industry, forestry and water management; Comecon cooperation; culture; economic administration; economics; education and science; elected state organs; external economic relations; fuels and energy; industry; transport and communications; international affairs; mass media; political organisation; science and technology; social organisations and national committees; state administration; and a general department). In most instances the party departments paralleled agencies and ministries of the government and supervised their activities to ensure conformity with KSČ norms and programmes.

Also under CC supervision were two party training centres: the Advanced School of Politics and the Institute of Marxism–Leninism (see below).

=== Republic level ===
Down on republic level party structure deviated from the government organisation in that a separate communist party unit existed in the Slovak Socialist Republic (see Communist Party of Slovakia) but not in the Czech Socialist Republic. KSS emerged from World War II as a party distinct from KSČ, but the two were united after the communist takeover in 1948. The reformer movement of the 1960s advocated a return to a system of autonomous parties for the two republics. Bureau for the Conduct of Party Work in the Czech Lands was created as a counterpart to KSS, but it was suppressed after the 1968 invasion and by 1971 had been stricken from party records.

=== Regional level ===
KSČ had ten regional subdivisions (seven in the Czech lands, three in Slovakia) identical to kraje, the ten major governmental administrative divisions. In addition, however, the Prague and Bratislava municipal party organs, because of their size, were given regional status within KSČ. Regional conferences selected regional committees, which in turn selected a leading secretary, a number of secretaries and a regional Supervisory and Auditing Commission.

Regional units were broken down into a total of 114 district-level (Czech: okresní) organisations. District conferences were held simultaneously every two to three years, at which time each conference selected a district committee that subsequently selected a secretariat to be headed by a district secretary.

=== Local level ===
At local level, KSČ was structured according to what it called "territorial and production principle"; basic party units were organised in work sites and residences where there are at least five KSČ members. In enterprises or communities where party membership was more numerous, smaller units functioned under larger city-, village- or factory-wide committees. Highest authority of the local organisation was, theoretically, the monthly membership meeting, attendance at which was a basic duty of every member. Each group selected its own leadership, consisting of a chairman and one or more secretaries. It also named delegates to the conference of the next higher unit, be it at municipal (like in case of larger cities) or district level.

== Membership ==
Since assuming power in 1948, KSČ had one of the largest per capita membership rolls in the communist world (11 percent of the entire population). The membership roll was often alleged by party ideologues to contain a large component of inactive, opportunistic, and "counterrevolutionary" elements. These charges were used on two occasions, between 1948 and 1950 and again from 1969 to 1971, as a pretext to conduct massive purges of the membership. In the first case, during the great Stalinist purges, nearly one million members were removed; in the wake of the Prague Spring and subsequent invasion, about half that number either resigned or were purged from KSČ.

Purges following the 1968 invasion hit especially the Czechs, the youth and the blue-collar workers, as well as the intelligentsia within the party membership. By the end of 1970, KSČ had lost approx. 27.8% of its members compared to January 1968 figures as a result of forced removal or voluntary resignation. Despite this attrition, a membership of "almost 1,200,000" was claimed in the spring of 1971 for a country with an estimated population of approx. 14.5 million – still one of the highest Communist party membership rates in the world on a percentage basis at that time. Owing to this membership decline, accelerated recruitment efforts were targeted at youth and factory workers for the rest of the 1970s.

The party's membership efforts in the 1980s focused on recruiting politically and professionally qualified people willing to exercise greater activism in implementing the party's program. Party leaders at the 17th Party Congress (1986) urged recruitment of more workers, young people, and women. In 1981 it had 1,538,179 members (10% of the population)

KSČ membership was contingent upon completion of a one-year period as a candidate member. Candidate members could not vote or be elected to party committees. In addition to candidates for party membership, there were also candidates for party leadership groups from the local levels to the Presidium. These candidates, already party members, were considered interns training for the future assumption of particular leadership responsibilities.

=== Training of members ===
Indoctrination and training of party members was one of the basic responsibilities of regional and district organizations, and party training was mostly conducted on these levels. Regional and district units worked with local party organizations in setting up training programs and determining which members would be enrolled in particular courses of study. On the whole, the system of party schooling changed little since it was established in 1949. A district or city organization provided weekly classes in the fundamentals of Marxism-Leninism, history of communism, socialist economics, and current party position on domestic and international affairs.

Members training for positions as party functionaries attended seminars at schools for Marxism–Leninism set up in local areas or at more advanced institutes for Marxism–Leninism found in Prague, Brno and Bratislava. The highest level of party training was offered at the Advanced School of Politics in Prague. Designed to train the top echelon of party leadership, the three-year curriculum had the official status of a university program and was said to be one of the best programs in political science in Eastern Europe. These institutions were under the direction of KSČ Central Committee.

=== Membership demographics ===
Because of KSČ's mandate to be a workers' party, questions about social background of party members took on a particular salience. KSČ was often reticent with precise details about its members, and the question of how many in the party actually belonged to the revolutionary proletariat proper became a delicate one. Official statements appeared to overstate the percentage of workers within the party's ranks. Nonetheless, a number of trends were clear. The proportion of workers in KSČ was at its highest (approximately 60% of total membership) after World War II but before the party took power in 1948. After that time, percentage of workers fell steadily to a low of an estimated one-quarter of the membership in 1970.

In the early 1970s, government media decried the "grave imbalance", noting that "[the] present class and social structure of party membership is not in conformity with the party's role as a vanguard for the working class." In highly industrialized central Bohemia, for example, only 1 in every 35 workers was party member, while 1 in every 5 administrators was. In 1976, after intensive efforts to recruit workers, number of workers rose to one-third of the KSČ membership, i.e., approx. its 1962 level. In the 1980s, driven by a need for "intensive" economic development, the party relaxed its rigid rule about young workers' priority in admissions and allowed district and regional committees to be flexible in their recruitment policy, as long as the overall proportion of workers did not decrease.

Average age of party members showed a comparable trend. In the late 1960s, fewer than 30% of party members were under 35 years of age, nearly 20% were over 60, and roughly half were 45 or older. The quip in 1971, a half-century after the party's founding in Czechoslovakia, was "After fifty years, a party of fifty-year-olds." There was a determined effort to attract younger members to the party in the middle to late 1970s; one strategy was to recruit children of parents who were KSČ members. The party sent letters to the youngsters' schools and their parents' employers, encouraging the children to join. By early 1980 approximately one-third of KSČ members were 35 years of age or younger. In 1983, average age of the "leading cadre" was still estimated at 50.

=== Lack of party loyalty in the 1970s and 1980s ===
Throughout the 1970s and 80s, government media denounced party members' lack of devotion to the pursuit of KSČ policies and goals. Complaints ranged from members' refusal to display flags from their apartment windows on festive occasions to their failure to show up for party work brigades, attend meetings, or pay dues; a significant minority of members tended to underreport their incomes (the basis for assessing dues). In 1970, after a purge of approximately one-third of the membership, an average of less than half the remaining members attended meetings. Perhaps one-third of members were consistently recalcitrant in participating in KSČ activities. In 1983, one primary party branch in the Prague-West district was so unmoved by admonishments that it had to be disbanded and its members dispersed among other organizations. In part, this was a measure of disaffection with Czechoslovakia's thoroughgoing subservience to Soviet hegemony, a Švejkian response to the lack of political and economic autonomy. It was also a reflection of the purge's targets. Those expelled were often the ideologically motivated, the ones for whom developing socialism with a human face represented a significant goal; those who were simply opportunistic survived the purges more easily.

== Election results ==
=== Czechoslovakia wide elections ===
==== Legislative elections ====
Date	Leader	Votes		Seats			Position
Date	Leader	#	%	#	±	Size	Position
1925	Josef Haken	913,711	12.9	41 / 300	▲41	2nd	Opposition
1929	Klement Gottwald	753,220	10.2	30 / 300	▼11	4th	Opposition
1935	Klement Gottwald	849,495	10.3	30 / 300	0	4th	Opposition
1946	Klement Gottwald	2,205,697	31.2	93 / 300	▲63	1st	Coalition
1948	Klement Gottwald	as part of National Front		160 / 300	▲67	1st	Majority
1954	Antonín Novotný	as part of National Front		262 / 368	▲102	1st	Majority
1960	Antonín Novotný	as part of National Front		216 / 300	▼46	1st	Majority
1964	Antonín Novotný	as part of National Front		217 / 300	▼1	1st	Majority
1971	Gustáv Husák	as part of National Front		145 / 200	▼72	1st	Majority
1976	Gustáv Husák	as part of National Front		137 / 200	▼8	1st	Majority
1981	Gustáv Husák	as part of National Front		137 / 200	0	1st	Majority
1986	Gustáv Husák	as part of National Front		138 / 200	▲1	1st	Majority
1990	Ladislav Adamec	1,445,407	13.6	23 / 150	▼115	2nd	Opposition

=== Devolved assembly elections ===
==== Slovak assembly elections ====
Date	Leader	Votes		Seats			Position
Date	Leader	#	%	#	±	Size	Position
1928	Matej Kršiak	190,595	14.4	5 / 54	▲5	3rd	Opposition
1935	Viliam Široký	185,494	12.3	5 / 54	0	4th	Opposition
1938	Banned. Hlinka's Slovak People's Party sole legal party.						
1946	Karol Šmidke	489,596	30.6	31 / 100	▲31	2nd	Coalition
1948	Štefan Bašťovanský	as part of National Front		78 / 100	▲47	1st	Majority
1954	Karol Bacílek	as part of National Front		47 / 103	▼28	1st	Majority
1960	Karol Bacílek	as part of National Front		45 / 100	▼2	1st	Majority
1964	Alexander Dubček	as part of National Front		58 / 92	▲13	1st	Majority
1971	Jozef Lenárt	as part of National Front		102 / 150	▲44	1st	Majority
1976	Jozef Lenárt	as part of National Front		101 / 150	▼1	1st	Majority
1981	Jozef Lenárt	as part of National Front		102 / 150	▲1	1st	Majority
1986	Jozef Lenárt	as part of National Front		103 / 150	▲1	1st	Majority
1990	Peter Weiss	450,855	13.4	22 / 150	▼81	4th	Opposition

==== Czech assembly elections ====
Date	Leader	Votes		Seats			Position
Date	Leader	#	%	#	±	Size	Position
1968	Alexander Dubček	as part of National Front		128 / 200	▲128	1st	Majority
1971	Gustáv Husák	as part of National Front		132 / 200	▲4	1st	Majority
1976	Gustáv Husák	as part of National Front		135 / 200	▲3	1st	Majority
1981	Gustáv Husák	as part of National Front		138 / 200	▲3	1st	Majority
1986	Gustáv Husák	as part of National Front		137 / 200	▼1	1st	Majority
1990	Jiří Machalík	954,690	13.2	33 / 200	▼104	2nd	Opposition

== Party leaders ==
		Title*	In office
Václav Šturc		General Secretary	1921–22
Alois Muna		General Secretary	1922–24
Josef Haken		General Secretary	1924–25
Bohumil Jílek		General Secretary	1925–29
Klement Gottwald	Portrait of Klement Gottwald from chest upwards in suit with tie	General Secretary / Chairman	1929 – 14 March 1953 as General Secretary 1929–1945 as Chairman 1945–1953
Antonín Novotný		First Secretary	14 March 1953 – 5 January 1968
Alexander Dubček		First Secretary	5 January 1968 – 17 April 1969
Gustáv Husák	Portrait of Gustáv Husák wearing a suit, tie and spectacles	First Secretary / General Secretary	17 April 1969 – 17 December 1987 as First Secretary 1969–1971 as General Secretary 1971–1987
Miloš Jakeš	Portrait of Milos Jakes wearing a hat, tie and coat	General Secretary	17 December 1987 – 24 November 1989
Karel Urbánek		General Secretary	24 November 1989 – 20 December 1989
Ladislav Adamec		Chairman	21 December 1989 – 1 September 1990

* Official designations of leaders of the KSČ: 1921–1945 General Secretary (Czech: generální tajemník; Slovak: generálny tajomník); 1945–53 Chairman (Czech: předseda; Slovak: predseda); 1953–1971 First Secretary (Czech: první tajemník;Slovak: prvý tajomník); 1971–1989: General Secretary; 1989–1990 Chairman.

== See also ==
- Pioneer Organization of the Socialist Youth Union
- Communist Party of Bohemia and Moravia
- Communist Party of Slovakia
- Communist Party of Slovakia (1939)
- National Front (Czechoslovakia)
- Left Front (Czechoslovakia)
- Eastern Bloc politics
- History of Czechoslovakia
