= Colotka's Second Cabinet =

Slovak Republic government, 1971–1976

- 2nd Cabinet of Slovakia (Czechoslovakia)
- 8 December 1971 – 4 November 1976
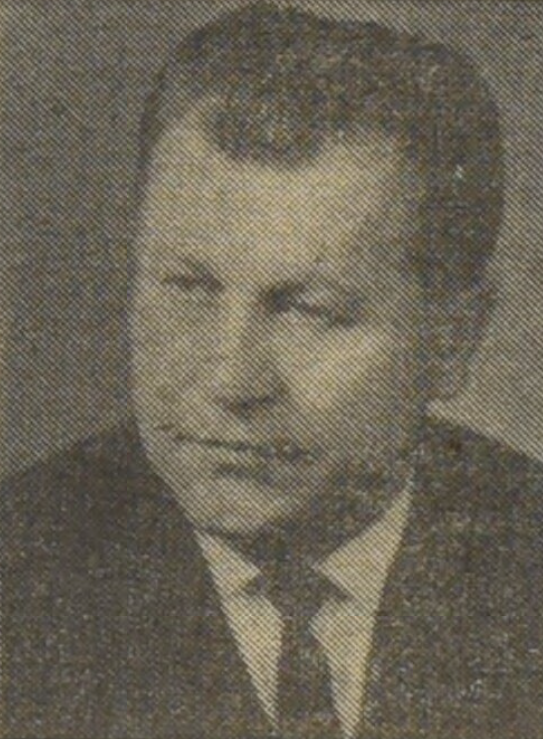
- Peter Colotka in 1971
- Date formed: 8 December 1971
- Date dissolved: 4 November 1976

People and organisations
- Head of state: Ludvík Svoboda (1971–1975); Gustáv Husák (1975–1976)
- Head of government: Peter Colotka
- Head of government's history: 1969–1971
- No. of ministers: 17
- Ministers removed: 4
- Total no. of members: 24
- Member party: KSS
- Status in legislature: Total control

History
- Incoming formation: 1971
- Outgoing formation: 1976
- Election: 1971 Slovak parliamentary election
- Predecessor: Sadovský's and Colotka's First Cabinets
- Successor: Colotka's Third Cabinet

Peter Colotka was the Prime Minister of the Slovak Socialist Republic from May 4, 1969, to October 12, 1988, a period during which he led a continuous government structure under single-party communist rule, rather than a series of distinct, formally numbered cabinets in the modern democratic sense. The government underwent personnel changes over his nearly two-decade tenure, but it was generally seen as one continuous administration during the "Normalization" era. This cabinet was formed after the 1971 SNR elections.

== Government ministers ==
| Office | Minister | Political Party | In office |
|---|---|---|---|
| Prime Minister | Peter Colotka | KSS | 8 December 1971 – 4 November 1976 |
| Minister of Industries | Alojz Kusalík | KSS | 8 December 1971 – 4 November 1976 |
| Minister of Labour, Social Affairs and Family | Dezider Kroscány | KSS | 8 December 1971 – 4 November 1976 |
| Minister of Finance | František Mišeje | KSS | 8 December 1971 – 4 November 1976 |
| Minister of Shopping | Dezider Goga | KSS | 8 December 1971 – 4 November 1976 |
| Minister of Agriculture | Ján Janovic | KSS | 8 December 1971 – 4 November 1976 |
| Minister of Interior | Egyd Pepich | KSS | 8 December 1971 – 11 July 1973 |
| Minister of Interior | Štefan Lazar | KSS | 11 July 1973 – 4 November 1976 |
| Minister of Justice | Pavol Király | KSS | 8 December 1971 – 4 November 1976 |
| Minister of Education | Štefan Chochol | KSS | 8 December 1971 – 16 July 1976 |
| Minister of Education | Juraj Buša | KSS | 16 July 1976 – 4 November 1976 |
| Minister of Culture | Miroslav Válek | KSS | 8 December 1971 – 4 November 1976 |
| Minister of Health | Emil Matejiček | KSS | 8 December 1971 – 4 November 1976 |
| Minister of Construction and Technics | Juraj Buša | KSS | 8 December 1971 – 16 July 1976 |
| Minister of Construction and Technics | Július Hanus (acting) | KSS | 16 July 1976 – 15 September 1976 |
| Minister of Construction and Technics | Václav Vačok | KSS | 15 September 1976 – 4 November 1976 |
| Minister of Architecture | Július Hanus (acting) | KSS | 8 December 1971 – 20 April 1972 |
| Minister of Architecture | Ján Bróska | KSS | 20 April 1972 – 4 November 1976 |
| Minister of the Forest and Water Economy | František Hagara | KSS | 8 December 1971 – 4 November 1976 |

=== Deputy Prime Ministers ===
| Minister | Political Party | In office | Notes |
|---|---|---|---|
| Július Hanus | KSS | 8 December 1971 – 4 November 1976 | |
| Herbert Ďurkovič | KSS | 8 December 1971 – 11 December 1972 | |
| Karol Martinka | KSS | 11 December 1972 – 4 November 1976 | |
| Václav Vačok | KSS | 11 December 1972 – 15 September 1976 | |
| Ján Gregor | KSS | 15 September 1976 – 4 November 1976 | |

== Party composition ==
| Party | Ideology | Leader | Deputies | Ministers |
|---|---|---|---|---|
| KSS | Communism | Jozef Lenárt | 150 / 150 | 17 / 17 |
| Total | | | 150 / 150 | 17 |

== Issues ==
=== Suicide bombing at Justice Ministry ===
The tragedy took place on January 16, 1973, but no one paid any attention to it. The next day, a state press release stated: “The explosion was probably caused by a mentally ill person who died in the explosion.” The report also stated that the office premises where the explosion occurred were significantly damaged.

That day, shortly after ten o’clock in the morning, a man entered the building of the Ministry of Justice of the Slovak Republic on what was then Suvorová Street. He was wearing an old fur coat, a sheepskin coat, and a bag in which he was hiding an explosive device was hanging over his shoulder.

No one could figure out why someone would want to kill the then Minister of Justice, Pavol Király. Investigators even worked with the theory that it could have been a politically motivated act of terrorism. It was not until the evening after the assassination, when the police caught the perpetrator, that it became clear what was really going on.

The minister's former driver Dezider Belko remembered this horror. "Chalmovský apparently mistook the director of the minister's office, Dr. Štepnička, for Minister Király. He asked him to arrange for him to be paid compensation, about three hundred thousand, otherwise he would blow everything up. He claimed that he had ten kilograms of explosives with him. He repeated that he had decided to die, but that someone had to go to the other world with him," the driver revealed in the daily Pravda years ago.

The driver Belko noticed a wire sticking out of the assassin's bag. He also saw a push-button switch there. "So this is serious," he thought and joined the conversation. He began to convince Chalmovský that he was at the wrong address and that if he wanted, he could go with him to the regional court, where his case was being resolved or not, and talk to the judge there. Chalmovský agreed. That's why the minister's secretary ran after the driver.

But she did not return for a long time and the tension in the room was already unbearable. Suddenly, the door to the minister's office opened and the minister stood there with two uniformed police officers. "At that moment, Chalmovský pressed the switch and an explosion sounded," Belko continued. When he regained consciousness after a while, everything around him was in ruins.

"I could not feel my legs or my left arm and I could only see out of one eye." Oto Štepnička was survived by his wife and son, Chalmovský died unmarried. The bomb he had planted tore his head from his body. Minister Király continued to hold his position until 1982, but according to his niece, he never heard out of one ear again.
