= Board of Commissioners (Slovak executive body) =

The Board of Commissioners (Slovak: Zbor povereníkov, Czech: Sbor pověřenců) was an executive body of the Slovak National Council.

== Creation ==
In 1943 two Slovak National Councils were created. One was created abroad and was a body of Slovak exiles, renamed in 1948 to Slovak National Council Abroad, until terminated in 1960.

The second one was an illegal body created as a rebellious organisation against clerofascist regime in first Slovak Republic, this body is also predecessor of current Slovak parliament. At the time of its creation it exercised legislative, executive and judicial powers and therefore members of the Council issued direction which created Board of Commissioners as of September 1, 1944 in order to shift the executive powers.

== Organisation ==
The first two Boards were headed by the Presidium of Slovak National Council and agenda was administered by the Office of the Presidium of Board of Commissioners. The number of commissioners varied through its existence from 9 (in the First Board) to 17 (in the Eleventh Board). Their seat was in Banská Bystrica and the bodies carried on work until October 23, 1944. The end of the Second Board was connected with the Slovak National Uprising.

The body was reinstalled on February 2, 1945, when the Third Board was created. It had 10 members. Fourth and Fifth Board (which ended his function on September 18) had 12 commissioners. These Boards had their seats in Košice and later in Bratislava.

After World War II the Sixth Board was created and a lot of changes were put in practise. The members were no longer elected, but they were appointed on a parity basis. Commissioners were chosen from representatives of the Democratic Party and the Communist Party. Another turnover was that there were established a presidency (leader was newly a single person). The first president was Karol Šmidke (September 18, 1945 – August 14, 1946).

The powers of the Board were restricted on June 27, 1946 by the Third Prague Agreement. The reason was a landslide victory of democrats in present-day Slovakia. After reconstitution of Czechoslovakia and landslide victory of communists in present-day Czech Republic, it was necessary for communist to stop all democratic attempts in Slovakia. The agreement also stated that the Board of Commissioners would be under control of the Czechoslovak government. These events became one of the reasons of frustration of Slovaks in the common state.

After elections in 1946, the Slovak National Council created new Boards (seventh and eighth) on August 14, 1946 led by Gustáv Husák. The form of the body was determined by Government Programme of Košice. Czechoslovakia was a unitary state where were two major nations (Czechs and Slovaks). The Board was supposed to be some kind of Slovak government. Gustáv Husák is considered to be former quasi-prime minister of the Slovak part of the republic. The limited powers remained in existence. There were 13 commissioners in this body.

Creation showed asymmetry in the executive as there was no similar body for Czechs. After Czechoslovak coup d'état of 1948 communist Board president Gustáv Husák suspended all democrats in the Board (though they were legally elected) and changed the body into communist. The Ninth Board (entirely occupied by communist) was created on March 6, 1946 with 12 commissioners. Soon it was replaced by the Tenth Board with 13 members in office from June 1948 to December 1954. In this Board a new leader was appointed in May 1950, namely Karol Bacílek, succeeded by Július Ďuriš in September 1951 who was succeeded by Rudolf Strechaj in January 1953. Rudolf Strechaj was president of the Eleventh and Twelfth Board as well.

== Abolition ==
The powers of Board were gradually more and more restricted, although the number of commissioners increased: the Eleventh Board had 17 and the Twelfth and final board had 15 members. On July 11, 1960, a new Constitution of the Czechoslovak Socialist Republic was adopted and the Board of Commissioners was entirely abolished. Later, in 1968, the Constitutional Act on the Czechoslovak Federation re-established the Board of Commissioners in the form of the Government of the Slovak Socialist Republic.
