= Ministry of National Security (Czechoslovakia) =

Former Czechoslovak government ministry

- Czech: Ministerstvo národní bezpečnosti Slovak: Ministerstvo národnej bezpečnosti

Ministry overview
- Formed: 23 May 1950; 76 years ago
- Dissolved: 14 September 1953; 72 years ago
- Jurisdiction: Czechoslovak Socialist Republic
- Headquarters: Prague
- Ministers responsible: Ladislav Kopřiva, first Minister of National Security; Karol Bacílek, last Minister of National Security

The Ministry of National Security (Czech: Ministerstvo národní bezpečnosti, Slovak: Ministerstvo národnej bezpečnosti; MNB) was a specialized ministry in the Czechoslovak Socialist Republic that functioned between 1950 and 1953.

== History ==
The ministry was created by a decree on 23 May 1950. The structure of the ministry was modeled after its Soviet counterpart, the Ministry of State Security (MGB). Ladislav Kopřiva became the first minister, to whom 47,185 members of various security forces were subordinated on 1 September 1950. The ministry's remit included all non-military armed forces: Public Security (VB), State Security (StB), the border guards and from 1952, the prison service.

The main reason for the creation of the ministry was adopted on a political decision for a large-scale repressive campaign. Its main element was party cleansing. The task was to lead to obedience or to eliminate potential elements of the internal party opposition, representatives of the pre-war generation of the Communist Party of Czechoslovakia and intellectuals.

Many members of the StB were also affected by the purges. In 1951, extensive purges were carried out at the ministry to prove the connection between the security forces and the alleged conspiracy within the Communist Party. Deputy Karel Šváb and StB Commander Osvald Závodský were executed, with whom several other persons from the ministry were sentenced to many years in prison as part of the alleged Trotskyist–Zionist group organized by Rudolf Slánský.

Along with the party purges, the MNB carried out actions to suppress the political opposition and anti-communist resistance. The state security monitored public sentiments (for example, the reaction of the masses to the Slánský trial), identified and persecuted real and potential opponents of the regime. A special direction was the suppression of underground organizations, some of which waged an armed struggle.

Bodies of the Ministry of National Security actively participated in suppressing the 1953 Plzeň uprising. After the army dispersed the demonstrators, the state security carried out arrests and interrogations of the participants.

On January 23, 1952, the leadership of the MNB was changed; Ladislav Kopřiva was dismissed, and the secretary of the Communist Party of Slovakia Karol Bacílek, a participant in the repressions against “Slovak bourgeois nationalists,” (the case of Gustáv Husák and Vladimír Clementis) one of the key organizers of the Slánský trial, was appointed. His first deputies were the Slovak functionary General Oskár Jeleň, (previously the head of the political department of the Czechoslovak army) and Antonín Prchal who was one of the key organizers of the Slánský case.

After the death of Klement Gottwald, the amount of political repression was decreased, and the ministry ceased to exist on 14 September 1953 by merging with the Ministry of the Interior, newly reorganized according to the advice of Soviet advisers. The reason for the merger of ministries was the efforts of the Communist Party to better control the StB. However, the activities of the StB did not change significantly, only the organizational structure was different. Rudolf Barák became the new Minister of the Interior on 14 September, and on 15 November 1953 his ministry had 99,793 members.

== Ministers ==
No.	Portrait	Minister	Took office	Left office	Time in office	Party	Ref.
1	Ladislav Kopřiva	Ladislav Kopřiva (1897–1971)	23 May 1950	23 January 1952	1 year, 245 days	KSČ	
2	Karol Bacílek	Karol Bacílek (1896–1974)	23 January 1952	14 September 1953	1 year, 234 days	KSČ	

== Committees and members of the ministry ==
Ministry of the Interior on 15 November 1953
State Security	13,000
Public Security	26,000
Correctional facilities management	8,000
Border and Internal Guard soldiers	44,451
Civil Defense soldiers	2,419
Civil servants	5,133
Total	99,793
