= Július Ďuriš =

Czechoslovak communist politician

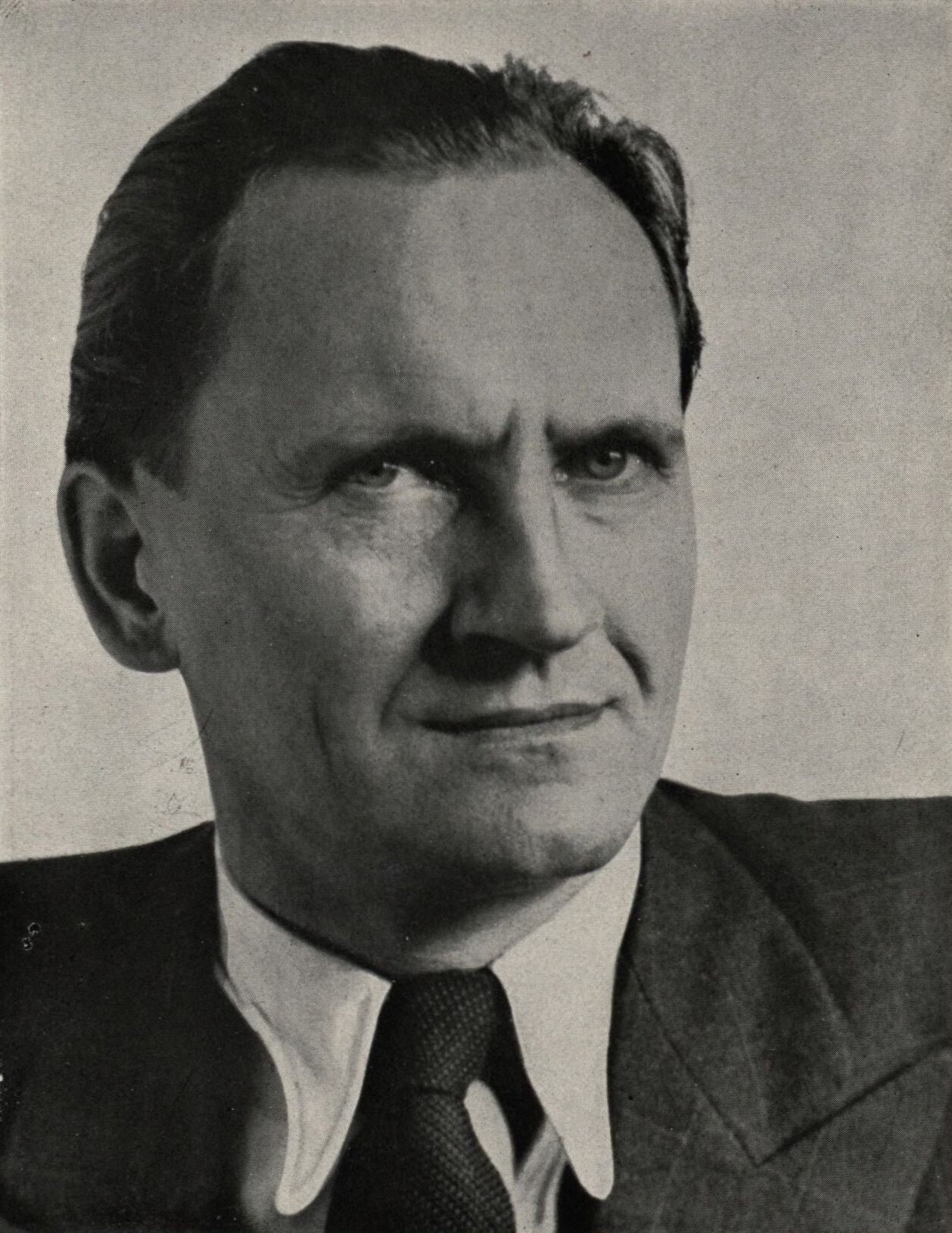
- Ďuriš in 1948

Minister of Finance
- In office 14 September 1953 – 20 September 1963
- Prime Minister: Viliam Široký
- Preceded by: Jaroslav Kabeš
- Succeeded by: Richard Dvořák

Minister of Forests and Timber Industry
- In office 31 January 1953 – 14 September 1953
- Prime Minister: Antonín Zápotocký; Viliam Široký
- Preceded by: Marek Smida
- Succeeded by: Marek Smida

Minister of Agriculture
- In office 4 April 1945 – 10 September 1951
- Prime Minister: Zdeněk Fierlinger (1945–1946); Klement Gottwald (1946–1948); Antonín Zápotocký (1948–1951)
- Preceded by: Ján Lichner
- Succeeded by: Josef Nepomucký

Personal details
- Born: 9 March 1904 Rovňany, Austria-Hungary
- Died: 18 February 1986 (aged 81) Prague, Czechoslovakia
- Party: Communist Party of Czechoslovakia

Július Ďuriš (9 March 1904 – 18 February 1986) was a Czechoslovak communist politician.

== Biography ==
The son of a teacher and the youngest of four siblings, Ďuriš was born in the village Rovňany near Lučenec; he grew up in a multiethnic environment, attending both Hungarian and Slovak grammar schools. After graduation in 1924, he began his studies at the Faculty of Law at Charles University in Prague. Ďuriš came into contact with communist ideas while studying in Paris in 1926–1927, and joined the Communist Party of Czechoslovakia (KSČ) upon his return from France. In 1928/1929, he abandoned his studies and was employed as a party worker of the KSČ. In the summer of 1929 he was assigned work in Ostrava as an editor at Pravda, the party's Slovak newspaper, but returned to France in the fall of the same year to work in the Czechoslovak section of the French Communist Party (PCF). Ďuriš served as editor of Rovnost, a magazine for Slovak workers in France, but was expelled from the country in December 1931 because of his political activities. After completing military service upon his return from France, Ďuriš moved to Bratislava, where he was appointed organizational secretary of the KSČ in Slovakia, as well as editor of the newspapers Pravda and Ľudové denník.

With the foundation of the pro-German Slovak Republic in 1939, Ďuriš became a member of the leadership of the underground Communist Party of Slovakia (KSS). He was arrested in August 1941 and sentenced to a 13-year prison term, but managed to escape in February 1945. In April of that year, Ďuriš joined the first post-World War II government of Zdeněk Fierlinger as Minister of Agriculture upon its formation in Košice; he would remain as such in several successive governments until 1951. Agricultural questions proved to be important in the run-up to the KSČ emerging as the largest party in the 1946 elections, with the party supporting land reform and redistribution from "Germans, Hungarians, collaborators and traitors" to Czech and Slovak farmers. After initially declaring that there would be no collectivization in Czechoslovakia, Ďuriš reversed this policy and supported the establishment of unified agricultural cooperatives in 1949.

Together with Viliam Široký, Ďuriš was one of the leaders of the campaign against so-called bourgeois nationalists in Slovakia, which culminated in political processes against and the imprisonment of Gustáv Husák and other Slovak party leaders in the early 1950s. After leaving office as Minister of Agriculture in 1951, Ďuriš chaired the Slovak Board of Commissioners until 1953, when he was again appointed to the government: first as Minister of Forests and Timber Industry from January to September 1953, and then as Minister of Finance.

Ďuriš's political downfall began in the early 1960s, when the processes of the 1950s were investigated and several of their victims rehabilitated. Combined with his disagreements with President Antonín Novotný, Ďuriš's previous role in the campaign against bourgeois nationalists led to his gradual removal from positions of power from 1963. In August 1968, Ďuriš, who had previously been known as a hardliner within the party, supported the Prague Spring and condemned the subsequent Warsaw Pact invasion of Czechoslovakia. He was expelled from the KSČ in 1970, and went on to declare himself a "communist outside the party"; during the 1970s and 1980s, he wrote extensive memoirs where he condemned the Soviet model of communism as "imperialistic" and criticized his former rival Husák, by now President.

== Honours and awards ==
- Order of the Republic (7 May 1955)
