= Rudé právo =

Defunct Czechoslovak newspaper

- "Proletáři všech zemí, spojte se!"

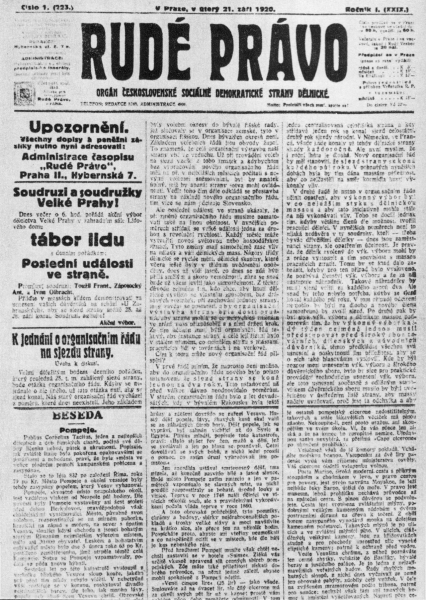
- First edition of Rudé právo from 21 September 1920
- Type: Daily newspaper
- Format: Broadsheet
- Owner: Communist Party of Czechoslovakia
- Founded: September 21, 1920
- Ceased publication: September 1995
- Political alignment: Communist
- Language: Czech
- Headquarters: Prague, Czechoslovakia
- Country: Czechoslovakia
- ISSN: 0032-6569

Rudé právo (Czech for Red Justice or The Red Right) was the official newspaper of the Communist Party of Czechoslovakia.

== History and profile ==
Rudé právo was founded in 1920 when the party was splitting from the social democrats and their older daily Právo lidu (lit. 'People's Right'). During the 1920s and 1930s it was often censored and even temporarily stopped. In autumn 1938, the party was abolished and during the German occupation and World War II that came soon afterwards the newspaper became an underground mimeographed pamphlet. Following the end of the war Josef Frolík became the chief administrator of the paper. After the communist take-over in 1948 it became the leading newspaper in the country, the Czechoslovak equivalent of the Soviet Union's Pravda, highly propagandistic and sometimes obedient to the government. Its Slovak equivalent in Slovakia was Pravda.

Following the Velvet Revolution, Rudé právo was privatised in 1989. In addition, some editors founded a new daily, Právo, unaffiliated with the party but taking advantage of the existing reader base.

== See also ==
- Eastern Bloc information dissemination
