= Pacem =

Pacem may refer to:

- Si vis pacem, para bellum is a Latin adage translated as, "If you wish for peace, prepare for war".
- Dona nobis pacem is a phrase in the Agnus Dei section of the Roman Catholic mass
- Dona nobis pacem is a cantata written by Ralph Vaughan Williams in 1936.
- Pacem in terris was a papal encyclical issued by Pope John XXIII on 11 April 1963.
- The Pacem in Terris Award has been awarded annually since 1964.
- The association of Catholic Clergy Pacem in Terris was a regime-sponsored organisation of Catholic clergy in the communist Czechoslovakia between 1971 and 1989.
- Pacem is a planet serving as the base of the Catholic Church in the science fiction series Hyperion Cantos.
- Pacem, the 16th-century European name for Pasai, a place in Sumatra
