= 1986 Slovak parliamentary election =

- 23–24 May 1986

All 150 seats in the Slovak National Council 76 seats needed for a majority
	First party
Leader	Jozef Lenárt
Party	KSS
Alliance	National Front
Last election	99.98%, 150 seats
Seats won	150
Seat change	Steady
Popular vote	3,487,244
Percentage	99.96%
Swing	▼0.02pp
PM before election
Peter Colotka
KSS
Elected PM
Peter Colotka
KSS

Parliamentary elections were held in the Slovak Socialist Republic on 23 and 24 May 1986 alongside national elections. All 150 seats in the National Council were won by the National Front. The Communist Party of Slovakia, the Party of Slovak Revival, the Freedom Party and independents were all represented in Parliament.

== Results ==
Party or alliance		Votes	%	Seats
National Front	Communist Party of Slovakia	3,487,244	99.96	103
National Front	Party of Slovak Revival	3,487,244	99.96	7
National Front	Freedom Party	3,487,244	99.96	7
National Front	Independents	3,487,244	99.96	33
Against		1,398	0.04	–
Total		3,488,642	100.00	150
Valid votes		3,488,642	99.94	
Invalid/blank votes		2,143	0.06	
Total votes		3,490,785	100.00	
Registered voters/turnout		3,499,301	99.76	
Source: CZSO SNR
