= 1976 Slovak parliamentary election =

- 22–23 October 1976

All 150 seats in the Slovak National Council 76 seats needed for a majority
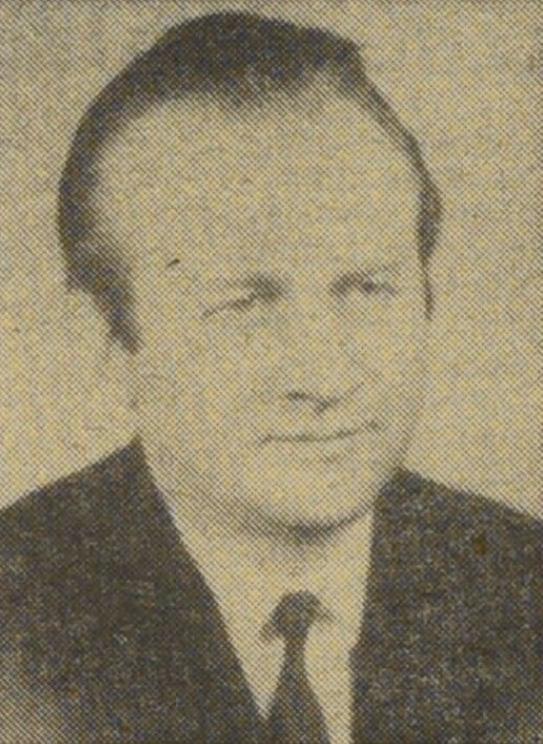
	First party
Leader	Jozef Lenárt
Party	KSS
Alliance	National Front
Last election	150 seats
Seats won	150
Seat change	Steady
PM before election
Peter Colotka
KSS
Elected PM
Peter Colotka
KSS

Parliamentary elections were held in the Slovak Socialist Republic on 22 and 23 October 1976 alongside national elections. All 150 seats in the National Council were won by the National Front.

== Results ==
Party or alliance		Votes	%	Seats
National Front	Communist Party of Slovakia	3,221,743	99.98	101
National Front	Party of Slovak Revival	3,221,743	99.98	7
National Front	Freedom Party	3,221,743	99.98	7
National Front	Independents	3,221,743	99.98	35
Against			0.02	–
Total				150
Total votes		3,224,685	–	
Registered voters/turnout		3,230,779	99.81	
Source: Slovakia National Council, Mička et al., CZSO
