= Ladislav Kopřiva =

Czechoslovak politician (1897–1971)

Ladislav Kopřiva (28 June 1897 in Ivanovice na Hané, Austria-Hungary – 13 November 1971 in Prague) was a Czechoslovak communist politician. During the era of Gottwald, his position was Minister of National Security, and he was largely responsible for a series of purges of party members, such as Czech Vice Premier Rudolf Slánský, stating that "Our Czechoslovak traitors [...] can be compared with Russia's Trotsky [...] Our conspiracies are not extraordinary, but only further evidence that our country is subject to the same laws of socialistic development as the Soviet Union."

Kopřiva soon fell out of favor; he was voluntarily relieved in late January 1952, to be replaced by Karol Bacílek, who would initiate yet more purges.

Like many high communist officials out of favor, he was soon purged from the party; in April 1963 he was expelled from the party because of his role in the purges after the findings of the Kolder Report, which partly rehabilitated many of those purged.

== Sources ==
- Time (magazine)
