= Central National Revolutionary Committee =

The Central National Revolutionary Committee (ÚNRV) was an anti-fascist resistance organization in Slovakia during the Second World War. The idea of forming the ÚNRV had been launched by the underground leadership of the Communist Party of Slovakia in late 1941. The committee was constituted, by cooperation between communists and bourgeois anti-fascists, in March 1942. In its initial stage ÚNRV failed to take a prominent role in Slovak politics. The committee was however revived by the Communist Party, as the party opted for a broader approach in building a national front. By April–May 1943, the ÚNRV was crushed by the state apparatus.
