= Munkás =

Czechoslovak communist newspaper

Munkás (Hungarian pronunciation: [ˈmuŋkaːʃ], 'Worker') was a Hungarian-language newspaper in Czechoslovakia. The newspaper, which was an organ of the Communist Party of Czechoslovakia, was one of the major Hungarian newspapers in Czechoslovakia in the latter half of the 1930s.
