= 1960 Slovak parliamentary election =

- 12 June 1960

All 87 seats in the Slovak National Council
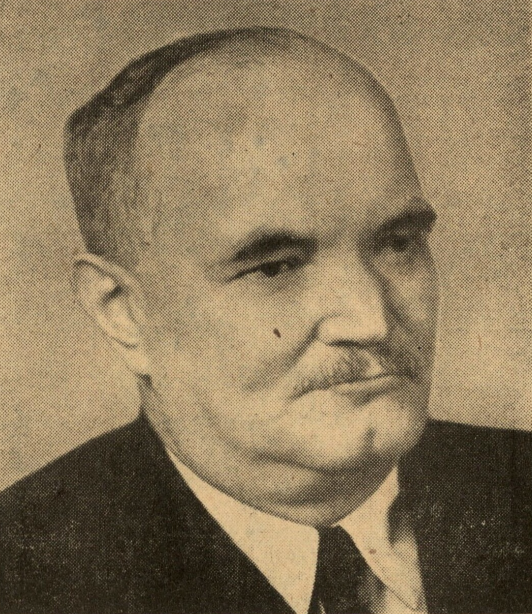
	First party
Leader	Karol Bacílek
Party	KSS
Alliance	National Front
Chairman before election
Rudolf Strechaj
KSS
Elected Chairman
Rudolf Strechaj
KSS

Parliamentary elections were held in Slovakia on 12 June 1960, alongside national elections. All 87 seats in the National Council were won by the National Front.

== Results ==
Party or alliance		Votes	%	Seats
National Front	Communist Party of Slovakia	2,511,281	99.79	87
National Front	Party of Slovak Revival	2,511,281	99.79	87
National Front	Freedom Party	2,511,281	99.79	87
National Front	Independents and others	2,511,281	99.79	87
Against		5,296	0.21	–
Total		2,516,577	100.00	87
Valid votes		2,516,577	99.77	
Invalid/blank votes		5,804	0.23	
Total votes		2,522,381	100.00	
Registered voters/turnout		2,532,813	99.59	
Source: PSP
