= 1981 Slovak parliamentary election =

- 5–6 June 1981

All 150 seats in the Slovak National Council 76 seats needed for a majority
	First party
Leader	Jozef Lenárt
Party	KSS
Alliance	National Front
Last election	150 seats
Seats won	150
Seat change	Steady
PM before election
Peter Colotka
KSS
Elected PM
Peter Colotka
KSS

Parliamentary elections were held in the Slovak Socialist Republic on 5 and 6 June 1981 alongside national elections. All 150 seats in the National Council were won by the National Front.

== Results ==
Party	Votes	%	Seats	+/–
National Front	3,366,295	99.98	150	0
Against	777	0.02	–	–
Total	3,367,072	100.00	150	0
Valid votes	3,367,072	99.96		
Invalid/blank votes	1,314	0.04		
Total votes	3,368,386	100.00		
Registered voters/turnout	3,376,672	99.75		
Source: PSP
