= 1954 Slovak parliamentary election =

- 28 November 1954

All 103 seats in the Slovak National Council
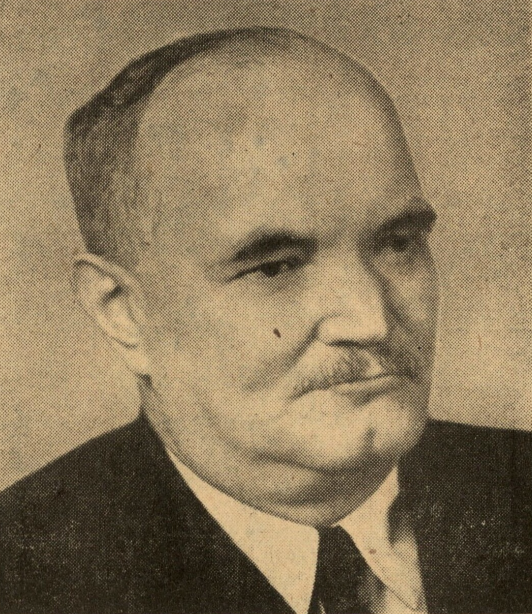
	First party
Leader	Karol Bacílek
Party	KSS
Alliance	National Front
Chairman before election
Rudolf Strechaj
KSS
Elected Chairman
Rudolf Strechaj
KSS

Parliamentary elections were held in Slovakia on 28 November 1954, alongside national elections. All 103 seats in the National Council were won by the National Front.

== Results ==
Party or alliance		Votes	%	Seats
National Front	Communist Party of Slovakia	2,249,547	97.27	47
National Front	Party of Slovak Revival	2,249,547	97.27	8
National Front	Freedom Party	2,249,547	97.27	3
National Front	Independents and others	2,249,547	97.27	45
Against		63,111	2.73	–
Total		2,312,658	100.00	103
Valid votes		2,312,658	99.50	
Invalid/blank votes		11,621	0.50	
Total votes		2,324,279	100.00	
Registered voters/turnout			99.13	
Source: PSP
