= Communist Party of Slovakia (1939) =

Communist Party of Slovakia Komunistická strana Slovenska
- Founded: May 1939
- Dissolved: 22 November 1990
- Preceded by: Communist Party of Czechoslovakia
- Succeeded by: Party of the Democratic Left
- Newspaper: Pravda
- Ideology: Communism; Marxism–Leninism; Stalinism (until 1956)
- Political position: Far-left
- National affiliation: Communist Party of Czechoslovakia (1948–1990)
- National organization: National Front (1944–1990)

The Communist Party of Slovakia (Slovak: Komunistická strana Slovenska, KSS) was a Marxist-Leninist party in the Slovak Socialist Republic. It was formed in May 1939, when the Slovak State was created, as the Slovak branches of the Communist Party of Czechoslovakia (KSČ) were separated from the mother party. When Czechoslovakia was again established as a unified state, the KSS was still a separate party for a while (1945–1948). On 29 September 1948, it was reunited with the KSČ and continued to exist as an "organizational territorial unit of the KSČ on the territory of Slovakia". Its main organ (and thus the main newspaper in Slovakia at the time) was Pravda.

After the merger KSS functioned as a regional affiliate of the KSČ, not as an independent political institution. Therefore, the organizational structure of the KSS mirrored that of the KSČ: the KSS Congress held session for several days every five years (and just before the KSČ's Congress), selecting its Central Committee members and candidate members, who in turn selected a Presidium, a Secretariat, and a First Secretary (i.e. party leader).

The most important first secretaries were Alexander Dubček (1963–1968) and Jozef Lenárt (1970–1988). Following the March 1986 party congress, the KSS Presidium consisted of 11 members; the Secretariat included, in addition to Lenárt, three secretaries and two members; and the Central Committee comprised 95 full members and 36 candidate members. The KSS in 1986 also had its own Central Control and Auditing Commission, four other commissions, twelve party departments, and one training facility.

KSS ceased to exist in 1990 (following the Velvet Revolution), when it was transformed into the independent social democratic party called the Party of Democratic Left (SDĽ). Most of that party, in turn, is now part of Direction – Social Democracy, which had separated from the SDĽ in 2000.

A new Communist Party of Slovakia was, however, founded in 1992 from a merger of the Communist Party of Slovakia – 91 and Communist League of Slovakia.

== Leaders ==
=== Party leaders (1944–1990) ===
- 1944–1945: Karol Šmidke
- 1945–1951: Štefan Bašťovanský
- 1951–1953: Viliam Široký
- 1953–1963: Karol Bacílek
- 1963–1968: Alexander Dubček
- 1968: Vasiľ Biľak
- 1968–1969: Gustáv Husák
- 1969–1970: Štefan Sádovský
- 1970–1988: Jozef Lenárt
- 1988–1990: Ignác Janák

=== Chairman of the Board of Commissioners for Slovakia (1945–1960) ===
- 1945–1946: Karol Bacílek
- 1946–1950: Gustáv Husák
- 1950–1951: Karol Bacílek
- 1951–1953: Július Ďuriš
- 1953–1960: Rudolf Strechaj

=== Prime Ministers of the Slovak Socialist Republic (1969–1990) ===
- 1969: Štefan Sádovský
- 1969–1988: Peter Colotka
- 1988–1989: Ivan Knotek
- 1989: Pavol Hrivnák
- 1989–1990: Milan Čič

== Election results ==
=== Slovak assembly elections ===
Date	Leader	Votes		Seats			Position
Date	Leader	#	%	#	±	Size	Position
1946	Karol Šmidke	489,596	30.61	31 / 100	▲31	2nd	Coalition
1948	Štefan Bašťovanský	as part of National Front		78 / 100	▲47	1st	Majority
1954	Karol Bacílek	as part of National Front		47 / 103	▼28	1st	Majority
1960	Karol Bacílek	as part of National Front		45 / 100	▼2	1st	Majority
1964	Alexander Dubček	as part of National Front		58 / 92	▲13	1st	Majority
1971	Jozef Lenárt	as part of National Front		102 / 150	▲44	1st	Majority
1976	Jozef Lenárt	as part of National Front		101 / 150	▼1	1st	Majority
1981	Jozef Lenárt	as part of National Front		102 / 150	▲1	1st	Majority
1986	Jozef Lenárt	as part of National Front		103 / 150	▲1	1st	Majority
1990	Peter Weiss	450,855	13.35	22 / 150	▼81	4th	Opposition

== See also ==
- Communist Party of Bohemia and Moravia
- Communist Party of Slovakia – 91
- Communist Party of Slovakia
- Slovak Socialist Republic
- Central National Revolutionary Committee
