= Liptovská Porúbka =

Village in Žilina Region, Slovakia

- Municipality
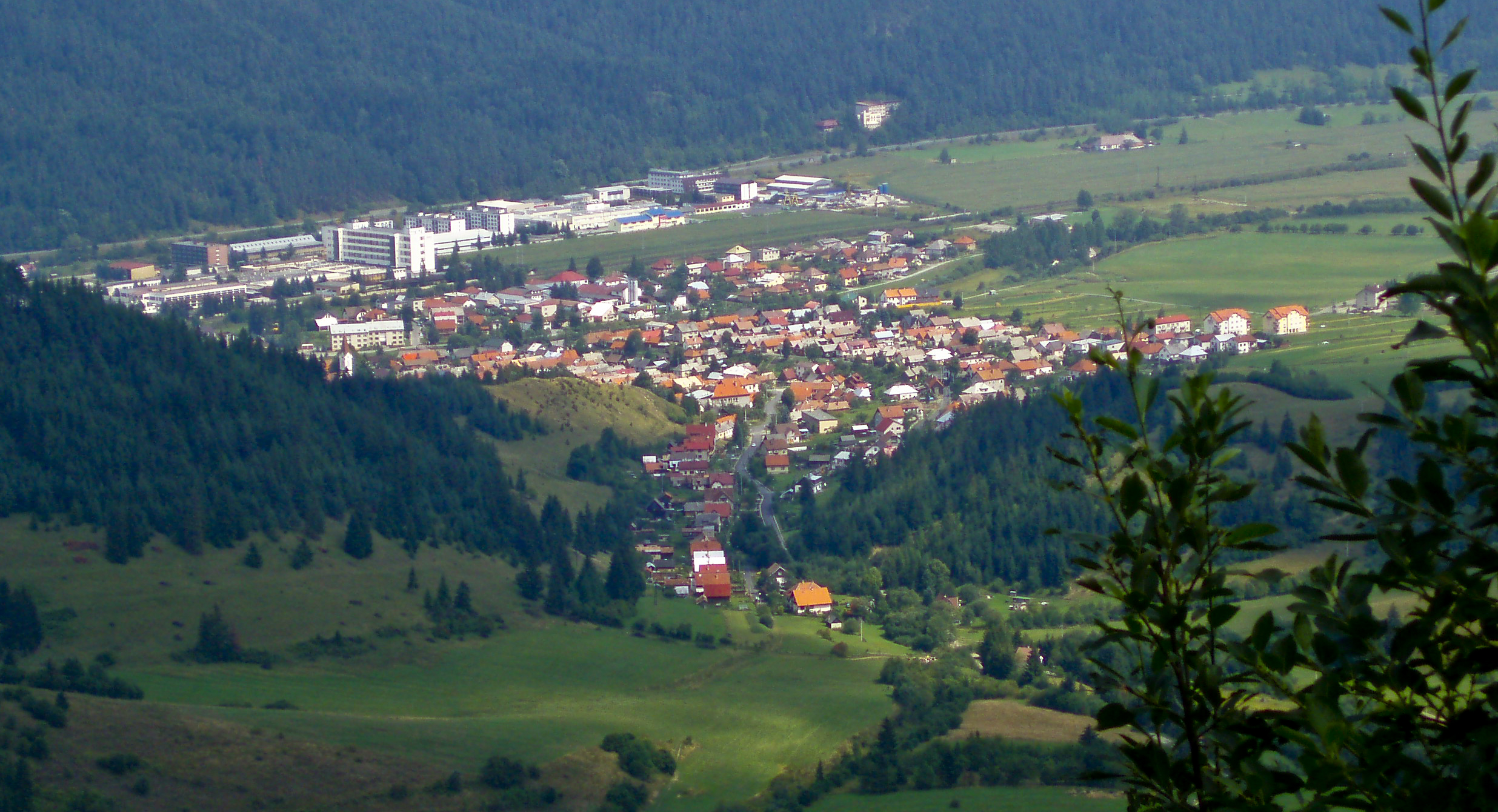

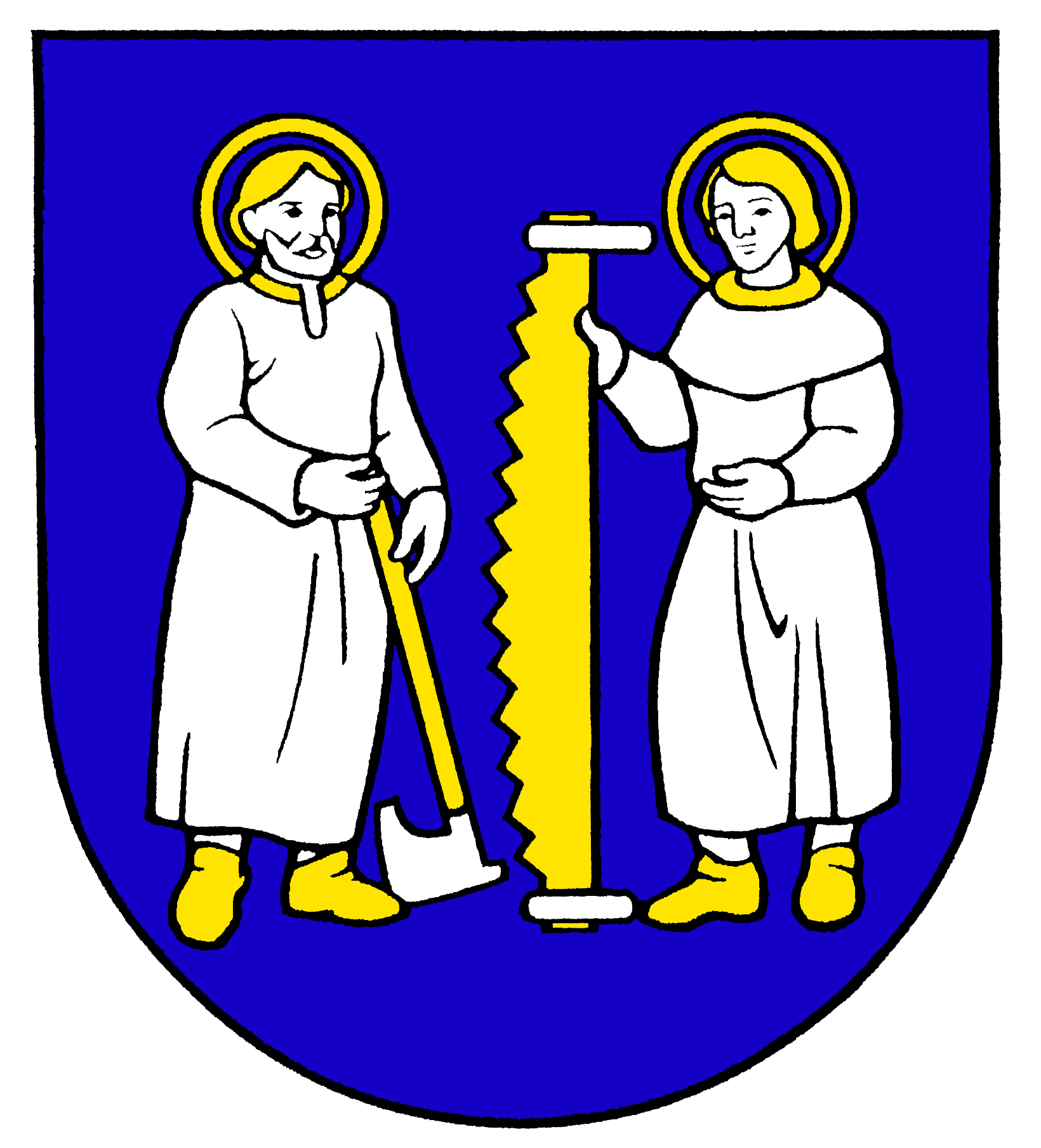
- Flag Coat of arms

- Location of Liptovská Porúbka in the Žilina Region Location of Liptovská Porúbka in Slovakia
- Coordinates: 49.03°N 19.75°E
- Country: Slovakia
- Region: Žilina Region
- District: Liptovský Mikuláš District
- First mentioned: 1379

Area
  - Total: 42.22 km^{2} (16.30 sq mi)
- Elevation: 649 m (2,129 ft)

Population (2025)
  - Total: 1,221
- Time zone: UTC+1 (CET)
  - Summer (DST): UTC+2 (CEST)
- Postal code: 330 1
- Area code: +421 44
- Vehicle registration plate (until 2022): LM
- Website: www.liptovskaporubka.sk

Liptovská Porúbka (Slovak: [ˈliptɔwskaː ˈpɔruːpka]; Hungarian: Kisporuba) is a village and municipality in Liptovský Mikuláš District in the Žilina Region of northern Slovakia.

== History ==
In historical records the village was first mentioned in 1379. Before the establishment of independent Czechoslovakia in 1918, it was part of Liptó County within the Kingdom of Hungary. From 1939 to 1945, it was part of the Slovak Republic.

== Geography ==
The municipality lies at an altitude of 649 metres (2,129 ft) and covers an area of 42.22 km^{2} (16.30 sq mi) (2025).

== Population ==
Population statistic (10 years)
Year	1995	2005	2015	2025
Count	978	1180	1149	1221
Difference		+20.65%	−2.62%	+6.26%

Population statistic
Year	2024	2025
Count	1233	1221
Difference		−0.97%

It has a population of 1221 people (31 December 2025).

=== Ethnicity ===
Census 2021 (1+ %)
Ethnicity	Number	Fraction
Slovak	1177	94.31%
Romani	136	10.89%
Not found out	42	3.36%
Total	1248	

In year 2021 was 1248 people by ethnicity 1177 as Slovak, 136 as Romani, 42 as Not found out, 5 as Hungarian, 4 as Czech, 3 as Italian, 3 as Other, 2 as Rusyn, 2 as Polish, 1 as Ukrainian and 1 as Serbian.

Note on population: The difference values of population numbers in the table "Population statistic" and in the sections "Ethnicity" & "Religion" is caused by the use of various statistical methods.

=== Religion ===
Census 2021 (1+ %)
Religion	Number	Fraction
Roman Catholic Church	501	40.14%
None	325	26.04%
Evangelical Church	307	24.6%
Not found out	38	3.04%
Jehovah's Witnesses	29	2.32%
Greek Catholic Church	18	1.44%
Total	1248	

In year 2021 was 1248 people by religion 501 from Roman Catholic Church, 325 from None, 307 from Evangelical Church, 38 from Not found out, 29 from Jehovah's Witnesses, 18 from Greek Catholic Church, 11 from Seventh-day Adventist Church, 4 from Other and not ascertained christian church, 4 from Christian Congregations in Slovakia, 3 from Other, 3 from Apostolic Church, 2 from Ad hoc movements, 1 from Eastern Orthodox Church, 1 from Paganism and natural spirituality and 1 from United Methodist Church.
