= 1948 Slovak parliamentary election =

- 30 May 1948

All 100 seats in the Slovak National Council
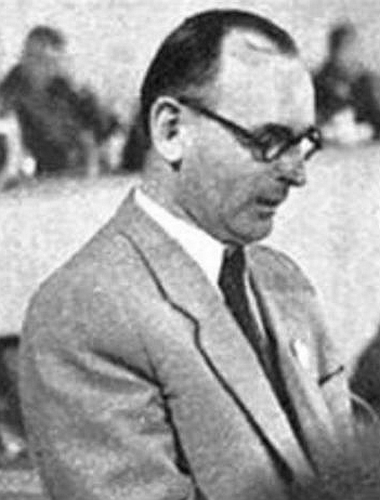
	First party
Leader	Štefan Bašťovanský
Party	KSS
Alliance	National Front
Chairman before election
Gustáv Husák
KSS
Elected Chairman
Gustáv Husák
KSS

Parliamentary elections were held in Slovakia on 30 May 1948, alongside national elections. They were first elections after the Communist takeover in 1948. All 100 seats in the National Council were won by member parties of the National Front. The elections also determined the composition of the Slovak Board of Commissioners.

== Results ==
Party or alliance		Seats
National Front	Communist Party of Slovakia	78
National Front	Party of Slovak Revival	17
National Front	Freedom Party	4
National Front	Independents	1
Total		100
