= Václav Slavík =

Czech architect

- Born: 23 September 1906; Přeštice, Austria-Hungary
- Occupation: Architect

Václav Slavík (23 September 1906 – ?), was a Czech architect. His work was part of the architecture event in the art competition at the 1936 Summer Olympics.
