= Act on Illegality of the Communist Regime and on Resistance Against It =

Parliament of the Czech Republic act

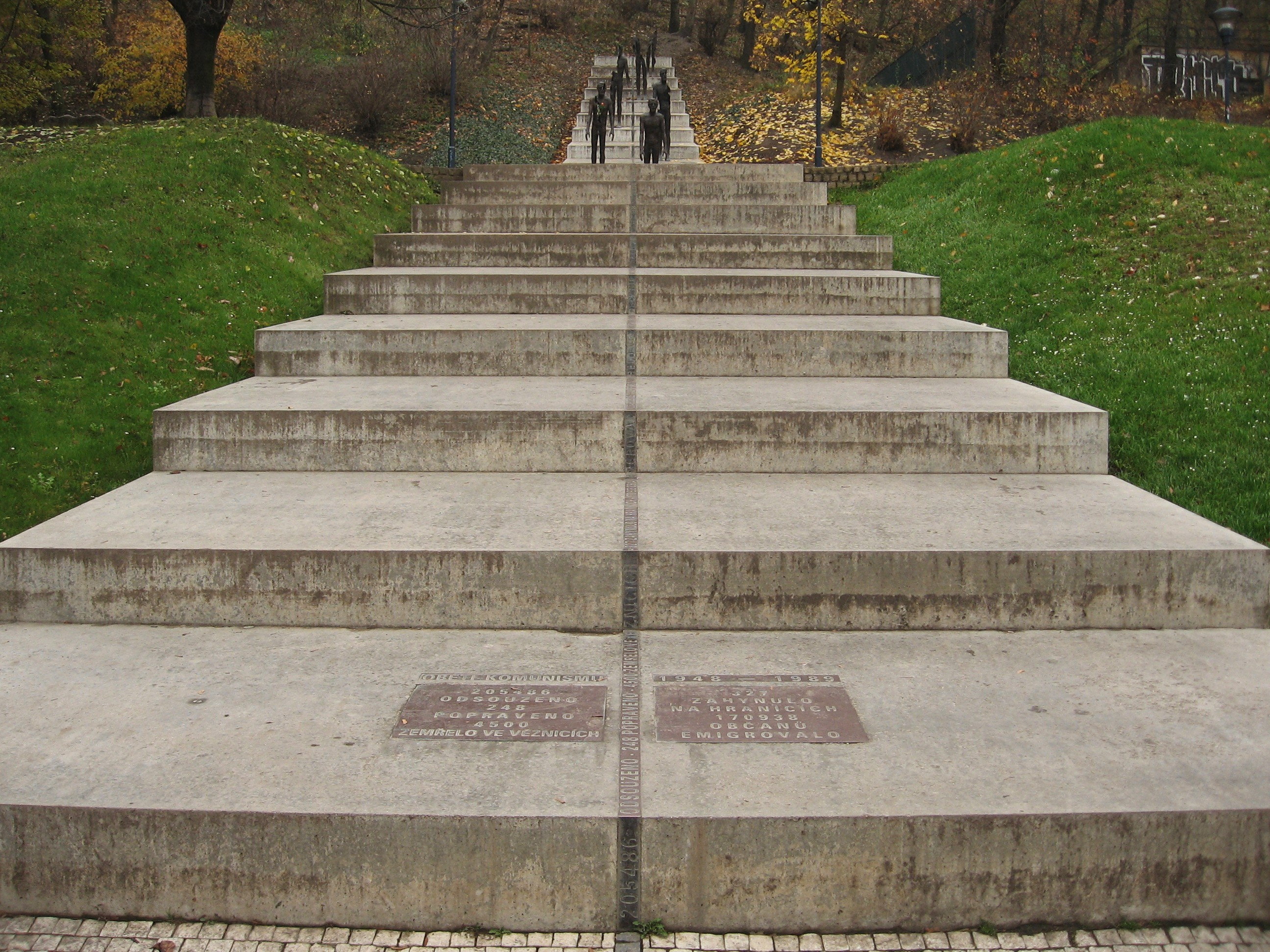
Memorial to the Victims of Communism in Prague

Act on Illegality of the Communist Regime and on Resistance Against It (Czech: Zákon o protiprávnosti komunistického režimu a o odporu proti němu, zákon č. 198/1993 Sb.) is an act passed on 9 July 1993 in the Parliament of the Czech Republic. This act declared the Communist regime in Czechoslovakia (25 February 1948 – 23 April 1990) as illegal and the Communist Party of Czechoslovakia as a criminal organisation. Most of the act is formulated as a resolution.

The resolution made the Czech Republic the first former Eastern Bloc country or successor state to officially condemn a former Communist regime.

== Challenge of the Act before the Constitutional Court of the Czech Republic ==
After passing the Act a group of 41 Deputies (MPs) challenged the Act before the Constitutional Court of the Czech Republic and demanded that the Act be declared as unconstitutional and voided. The Constitutional Court, however, ruled on 21 December 1993 that the Act was not in violation with the constitutional order of the Czech Republic and refused to void it.

According to the Constitutional Court although the Act is more a political declaration than ordinary act regulating rights and duties, it is necessary to cope with the regime and it can be made in the form of statute if the Parliament wishes so. Furthermore, this is not the only "political declaration act" in the Czech Republic's legal system, there are more (e. g. Lex Masaryk, Lex Štefánik and later passed Lex Beneš and Lex Havel).
