= 1971 Slovak parliamentary election =

- 26–27 November 1971

All 150 seats in the Slovak National Council 76 seats needed for a majority
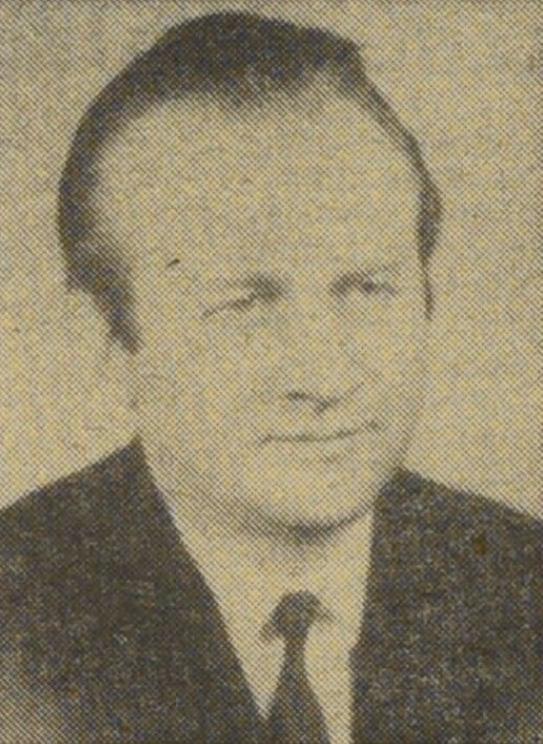
| | First party |
|---|---|
| Leader | Jozef Lenárt |
| Party | KSS |
| Alliance | National Front |
| Last election | 92 seats |
| Seats won | 150 |
| Seat change | ▲58 |
PM before election
Peter Colotka
KSS
Elected PM
Peter Colotka
KSS

Parliamentary elections were held in the Slovak Socialist Republic on 26 and 27 November 1971 alongside national elections. All 150 seats in the National Council were won by the National Front.

== Results ==
| Party | Votes | % | Seats | +/– |
|---|---|---|---|---|
| National Front | 2,983,603 | 99.94 | 150 | +58 |
| Against | | 0.06 | – | – |
| Total | | | 150 | +58 |
| Total votes | 2,989,273 | – | | |
| Registered voters/turnout | 3,002,948 | 99.54 | | |
Source: Mička et al., CZSO
