= Vasiľ Biľak =

Czechoslovak Communist Statesman

Vasil Biľak
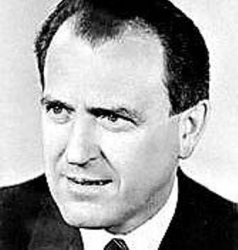

Secretary of the Central Committee of the Communist Party of Czechoslovakia
- In office November 1968 – 12 December 1989

Personal details
- Born: 11 August 1917 Krajná Bystrá, Šariš County, Slovakia)
- Died: 6 February 2014 (aged 96) Bratislava, Slovakia
- Profession: Tailor, politician

RSDr. Vasiľ Biľak (11 August 1917 – 6 February 2014) was a Slovak Communist politician and leader of Rusyn origin.

Vasiľ Biľak was born in Krajná Bystrá, in the Šariš County of the Kingdom of Hungary (present-day Slovakia) in a family of Rusyn ethnicity and was originally a tailor and inseam expert. Active in the communist movement since 1936, in 1955–1968 and 1969–1971 he was a member of the Central Committee of the Communist Party of Slovakia (ÚV KSS); in 1962–1968 he was the secretary and from January until August 1968 General secretary of ÚV KSS; from April 1968 until December 1988 he was a member of the Presidium of the Central Committee of the Communist Party of Czechoslovakia (ÚV KSČ). From November 1968 until December 1988 he was a secretary of ÚV KSČ with significant influence on the foreign policy and the ideology of the party. In 1960–1989 he was a member of National Assembly, later Federal Assembly.

In 1968 he belonged to the exponents of the hardline wing in the KSČ; he supported the Soviet invasion and participated in the so-called "normalization process" after the political liberalization called the Prague Spring.

He was one of the politicians who signed the invitation letter for the armies of Warsaw Pact countries. In December 1989, he was suspended from the KSČ. The Slovak Justice Minister Ján Čarnogurský said in 2001 he would not ask the Slovak President Rudolf Schuster to grant an amnesty to Biľak, the Czechoslovak Communist Party ideologist was charged with treason in connection with the "invitation" sent to Warsaw Pact countries to extend "brotherly help" to Czechoslovakia in 1968. In 2011, the trial process with Biľak ended unsuccessfully, when the prosecutor stopped it for lack of witnesses.

He died in 2014, aged 96, in Bratislava. He was the last of the original five 'Tankies' to die.
