= Karol Bacílek =

Czechoslovak politician

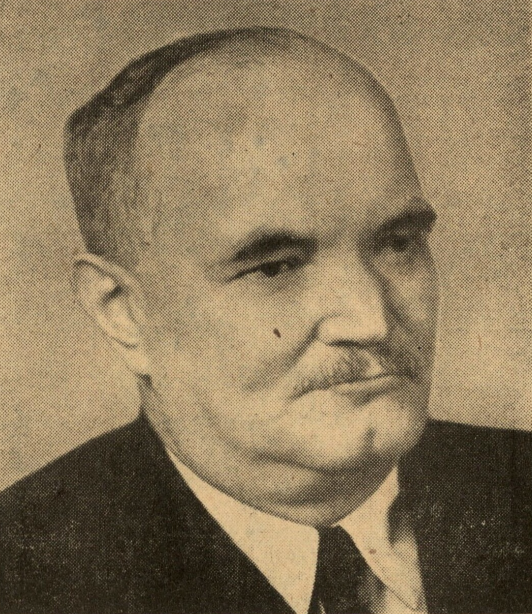
- Bacílek in 1954

Minister of National Security
- In office 23 January 1952 – 14 September 1953
- Prime Minister: Viliam Široký; Antonín Zápotocký
- Preceded by: Ladislav Kopřiva
- Succeeded by: Office abolished

Minister of State Control
- In office 8 September 1951 – 23 January 1952
- Prime Minister: Antonín Zápotocký
- Preceded by: Position established
- Succeeded by: Jan Harus

First Secretary of the Communist Party of Slovakia
- In office September 1953 – April 1963
- President: Klement Gottwald
- Preceded by: Štefan Bašťovanský
- Succeeded by: Alexander Dubček

Personal details
- Born: 12 October 1896 Choťánky, Kingdom of Bohemia, Austria-Hungary
- Died: 19 March 1974 (aged 77) Bratislava, Czechoslovakia
- Party: Communist Party of Czechoslovakia
- Other political affiliations: Communist Party of Slovakia
- Awards: Order of Klement Gottwald

Karol Bacílek (12 October 1896 – 19 March 1974) was a Czechoslovak communist politician, activist and high-ranking state and Communist Party official during the leadership of Klement Gottwald.

== Biography ==
Bacílek was born in to a Slovak working-class family and was trained as a locksmith. He served in the Austro-Hungarian Army during the First World War. He joined the Communist Party of Czechoslovakia in the 1921 and worked as a functionary of the party in Slovakia. After the beginning of the Second World War he moved to the Soviet Union. In 1943 alongside Karol Šmidke he was deployed in Poland and entered Slovakia in order to conduct the Slovak National Uprising.

After the liberation of Czechoslovakia, he worked in important political positions in the Communist Party of Slovakia. In April 1945, he became a member of the Provisional Central Committee of the Communist Party of Czechoslovakia. He worked as a secretary of the Central Committee and head of the agricultural department of the Central Committee of the Communist Party of Slovakia. He belonged to the centralist wing of the Communist Party of Slovakia, which did not agree with a more significant transfer of powers to the Slovak party and government bodies.

During political repressions and party purges, he was a member of the leadership of the Communist Party of Czechoslovakia. He was secretary of the Communist Party of Czechoslovakia from 1951 to 1953, Chairman of the Council of Commissioners of the Slovak National Council, from May 4, 1950 to September 7, 1951.

He headed two key ministries in Prague; Ministry of State Control and Ministry of National Security. He applied repressive measures, as the Minister of National Security, he prepared the political processes of the early 1950s in Czechoslovakia, including the Slánský Trial.

In 1950, he was one of a group of opponents of Gustáv Husák, who took part in his downfall of power. Together Viliam Široký he was an initiator of the purging of the so called "bourgeois nationalists" within the KPS leadership.

Until 1964 he sat in the National Assembly of the Czechoslovak Socialist Republic. At the same time, he was elected to the Slovak National Council in the 1960 elections.

His political career ended abruptly in 1963. After the Kolder Commission revised some of the political processes of the 1950s, Bacílek was removed from all public and party positions. Alexander Dubček replaced him as the first secretary of the KPS.
