= Association of Catholic Clergy Pacem in Terris =

Association of Catholic Clergy Pacem in Terris (Czech: Sdružení katolických duchovních Pacem in terris, Slovak: Združenie katolíckych duchovných Pacem in terris), abbreviated SKD PiT or simply PiT, was a regime-sponsored organisation of Catholic clergy in Communist Czechoslovakia between 1971 and 1989. Its name was taken from the well-known encyclical Pacem in terris of the reform Pope John XXIII.

SKD PiT was registered on August 1, 1971, and its stated purposes were peace in the world and friendship between nations. In fact, its raison d'être was rather to control and spy on the clergy and influence the life of the whole church. Its founding assembly was held in Prague on August 31, 1971.

In the 1970s, its role in the Czech and Slovak Catholic church was not endangered by the official leadership of the church (Pope Paul VI and Pope John Paul I), who did not approve of the Association but could do almost nothing to prevent its actions. The situation changed slowly after the new Pope John Paul II, who came from a communist country, was elected in 1978 and adopted a more principled course against communists. The most important papal document here is Quidam episcopi from 1982, prohibiting membership in political organizations to priests.

The Prague archbishop František Tomášek followed the pope and prohibited membership in SKD PiT to his priests. SKD PiT started to weaken in the 1980s and collapsed immediately after the Velvet Revolution in November 1989. The official dismantling of the organization was dated December 7 and announced on December 11, 1989 to Tomášek.

== Sources ==
- Chronology of the Velvet revolution (in Czech)
- Martin Vaňáč about the end of the SKD PiT (in Czech)
- Web site of the book Ján Šimulčík: "Združenie katolíckych duchovných Pacem in terris (Výber zo samizdatových dokumentov 1969 - 1989)" (in Slovak)
