= Karol Šmidke =

Slovak communist politician (1897–1952)

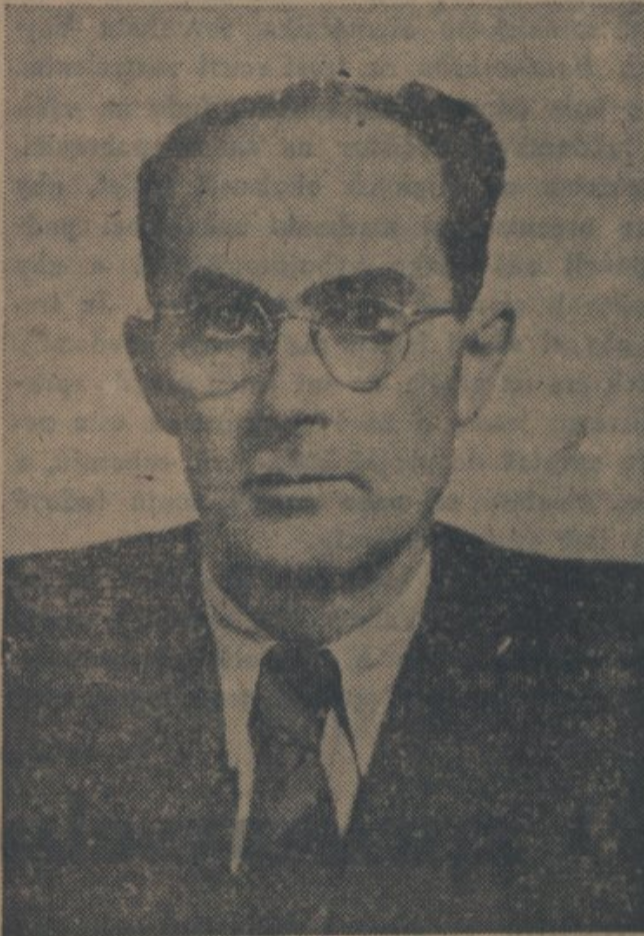
- Šmidke in 1944

Speaker of the Slovak National Council
- In office 14 September 1945 – 14 July 1950; Serving with Jozef Lettrich (14 September 1945 – 26 February 1948)
- Preceded by: Jozef Lettrich
- Succeeded by: František Kubač
- In office 5 September 1944 – 23 October 1944; Serving with Vavro Šrobár
- Preceded by: Vavro Šrobár; Gustáv Husák; Ján Ursíny
- Succeeded by: Vavro Šrobár; Gustáv Husák; Ján Ursíny

Personal details
- Born: 21 January 1897 Witkowitz, Austria-Hungary (now Vítkovice, Czech Republic)
- Died: 15 December 1952 (aged 55) Czechoslovak Socialist Republic
- Party: Communist Party of Czechoslovakia

Karol Šmidke (21 January 1897 – 15 December 1952) was a Slovak communist politician, resistance fighter, and a member of the Communist Party of Czechoslovakia.

Šmidke was Co-President of the Presidium of the Slovak National Council (with Vavro Srobar) 5 September - c. 23 October 1944, Co-Speaker of the Slovak National Council (with Jozef Lettrich) 14 September 1945 - 26 February 1948, Acting Speaker from 26 February to 12 March 1948 and Speaker 12 March 1948 - 14 July 1950. He was also the first President of the Board of Commissioners from 18 September 1945 until 14 August 1946, when he was succeeded by Gustáv Husák.

In 1950 he lost his position in the party and was put under investigation, alongside Gustáv Husák, Laco Novomeský, and Vladimír Clementis, under accusations of being a "bourgeois nationalist". He would die under unclear circumstances in 1952 before he was to be put on trial. He would be posthumously rehabilitated in 1967.
