= Jozef Lenárt =

Slovak politician (1923 - 2004)

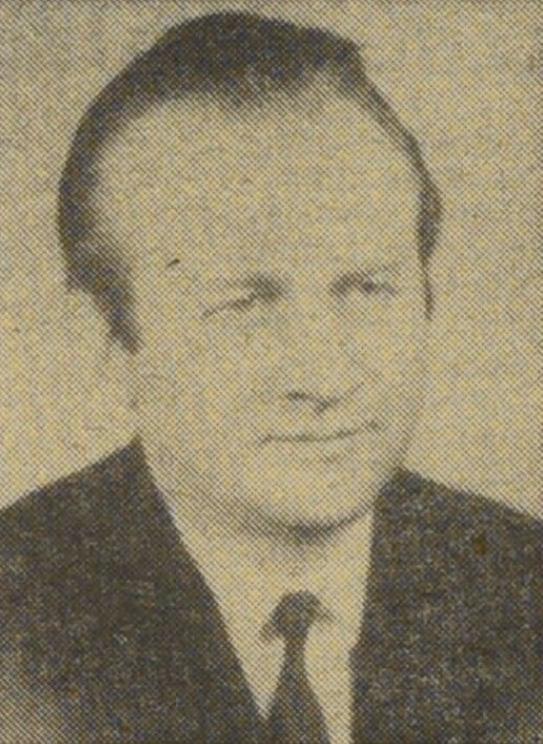
- Lenárt in 1971

Prime Minister of Czechoslovakia
- In office 20 September 1963 – 8 April 1968
- Prime Minister: Antonín Novotný; Ludvík Svoboda
- Preceded by: Viliam Široký
- Succeeded by: Oldřich Černík

Acting President of Czechoslovakia
- In office 22 March 1968 – 30 March 1968
- Preceded by: Antonín Novotný
- Succeeded by: Ludvík Svoboda

Personal details
- Born: 3 April 1923 Liptovská Porúbka, Czechoslovakia (now Slovakia)
- Died: 11 February 2004 (aged 80) Prague, Czech Republic

Jozef Lenárt (3 April 1923 – 11 February 2004) was a Slovak politician who was the prime minister of Czechoslovakia from 1963 to 1968.

== Life and career ==
Born in Liptovská Porúbka, Slovakia, he graduated from a chemistry high school and worked for the Baťa company. He became a member of the Communist Party of Czechoslovakia (KSČ) and of the Communist Party of Slovakia (KSS).

Lenart was a member of the federal parliament (whose name changed several times) from 1960 to 1990, and was Speaker of the Slovak National Council from 1962 to 1963. He was also a member from 1971 to (?)1990. He served as Prime Minister of Czechoslovakia between 1963 and 1968.

Although ethnically Slovak, he became a Czech citizen after the country split in 1993.

On the basis of insufficient evidence, on 23 September 2002 Lenárt was acquitted of treason charges (along with his co-defendant Miloš Jakeš), related to his handling (or lack thereof) of the Prague Spring events in 1968. He was accused of attending a meeting at the Soviet embassy in Prague on the day after the 1968 Warsaw Pact invasion, planning to establish a new "workers and farmers'" government.

Jozef Lenárt was a long-standing official in Czechoslovakia's communist government, holding various leadership positions for 25 years. His tenure spanned multiple leadership transitions and significant shifts in state policy.

He died in Prague in 2004.

== Major functions ==
- 1950–1953, 1957–1966, and 1970–(?)1990: Member of the KSS
- 1956–1958: Leading Secretary of the Regional Committee of the KSS
- 1958–1962: Secretary of the Central Committee of the KSS
- 1958–(?)1990: Member of the Central Committee of the KSČ
- 1962–1963: Chairman of the Slovak National Council
- 1963–1968: Prime Minister of Czechoslovakia
- 1968–1970: Secretary of the Central Committee of the KSČ
- 1970–1987: First Secretary of the Central Committee of the KSS
- 1970–(?)1990: Member of the Presidium of the KSČ
- 1971–(?)1990: Chairman of the Central Committee of the National Front of the Slovak Socialist Republic, and Vice-Chairman of the Central Committee of the National Front of the Czechoslovak Socialist Republic

== See also ==
- List of prime ministers of Czechoslovakia
- List of presidents of Czechoslovakia

Political offices
Preceded by Viliam Široký	Prime Minister of Czechoslovakia; 1963–1968	Succeeded by Oldrich Černík
Preceded by Antonín Novotný	President of Czechoslovakia (acting); 1968	Succeeded by Ludvík Svoboda
