= Pravda (Slovakia) =

Slovak centre-left newspaper founded in 1920

- Type: Daily newspaper
- Format: Berliner (until 2009) Tabloid
- Owner: Our Media SR a.s.
- Founded: 1920
- Political alignment: Independent
- Website: www.pravda.sk

Pravda (Slovak for 'Truth') is a major centre-left newspaper in Slovakia. It is owned by Our Media SR a.s.

== History and profile ==
Pravda was established in 1920. The daily circulation of Pravda in December 2021 was 27,723 copies and the average number of daily sold copies was 20,266. Since 2010, Pravda has seen a continuous increase in the daily news-stand sales. The online version has 2,217,285 real users according to current AIM figures of February 2022. As of the end of 2021, every edition of Pravda daily has been read by about 220 thousand people.

Pravda is profiled as a liberal left-wing newspaper. Its editor-in-chief has been Jakub Prokeš since 2020.
