= 2026 Slovak regional elections =

The 2026 Slovak regional elections took place in Slovakia on 24 October 2026, together with the local elections.

== Results by region ==
The following tables show the results of the elections of the regional chairmen.

=== Bratislava Region ===
Candidate	Party	Votes	%
Juraj Droba (incumbent)	Freedom and Solidarity (Note: Supported by Progressive Slovakia, Democrats and Team Bratislava.)	188,732	70.97
Rastislav Gajarský	Voice – Social Democracy (Note: Supported by Direction – Social Democracy and Slovak National Party.)	30,695	11.54
Zuzana Krajčovičová	Right to Truth (Note: Supported by Mayors and Independent Candidates.)	25,556	9.61
Dávid Staruch	Independent	12,291	4.62
Ján Chalabala	Communist Party of Slovakia	3,377	1.27
Peter Poláček	SLOVEXIT	2,932	1.10
Ľudovít Líška	Unity of Slavs	2,358	0.89
Total		265,941	100.00

=== Trnava Region ===
Results by district

Candidate	Party	Votes	%
Jozef Viskupič (incumbent)	Progressive Slovakia (Note: Supported by Freedom and Solidarity, Christian Democratic Movement, Democrats, Slovakia Movement, Hungarian Forum and Civic Conservative Party.)	103,083	54.05
József Berényi	Hungarian Alliance	39,790	20.86
Peter Hambálek	Direction – Social Democracy (Note: Supported by Voice – Social Democracy, Slovak National Party and Republic.)	22,263	11.67
Matej Lančarič	Independent	13,644	7.15
Róbert Dohál	Alternative for Slovakia	5,198	2.73
Jaroslav Cehlárik	Right to Truth	4,224	2.21
Štefan Pollák	Together Citizens of Slovakia	2,519	1.32
Total		190,721	100.00

=== Trenčín Region ===
Candidate	Party	Votes	%
Jaroslav Baška (incumbent)	Direction – Social Democracy (Note: Supported by Voice – Social Democracy, Republic and Slovak National Party.)	119,827	57.44
Natália Svítková	Democrats (Note: Supported by Slovakia Movement, Christian Democratic Movement, Civic Conservative Party, Progressive Slovakia and Freedom and Solidarity.)	81,400	39.02
Daniel Galas	SLOVEXIT	4,787	2.29
Lubomír Choleva	Patriotic Bloc	2,595	1.24
Total		208,609	100.00

=== Nitra Region ===
Candidate	Party	Votes	%
Branislav Becík (incumbent)	Voice – Social Democracy (Note: Supported by Direction – Social Democracy, Slovak National Party, Republic, Right to Truth and Brothers of Slovakia.)	115,058	50.47
Henrich Varga	Team Nitra Region (Note: Supported by Freedom and Solidarity, Progressive Slovakia, Christian Democratic Movement, Slovakia Movement, Democrats, Hungarian Forum and Civic Conservative Party.)	65,807	28.87
Tibor Csenger	Hungarian Alliance	23,726	10.41
Erik Blaško	Unity of Slavs	7,988	3.50
Jolana Čuláková	Independent	7,848	3.44
Róbert Švec	Slovak Revival Movement	5,573	2.44
Karol Suchan	SLOVEXIT	1,961	0.86
Total		227,961	100.00

=== Žilina Region ===
Candidate	Party	Votes	%
Erika Jurinová (incumbent)	Slovakia Movement (Note: Supported by For the People, NOVA, Progressive Slovakia, Freedom and Solidarity, Christian Democratic Movement, Democrats, Conservatives – Christian Union, Civic Conservative Party and Democratic Party – Civic Democrats of Slovakia.)	134,617	52.07
Igor Choma	Direction – Social Democracy (Note: Supported by Voice – Social Democracy and Home – National Party.)	66,725	25.81
Martin Kapitulík	Independent	32,721	12.66
Anna Belousovová	Republic (Note: Withdrew their candidacy before election day; their name remained on the ballot.)	13,761	5.32
Adam Lučanský	Slovak National Party	6,000	2.32
Jana Chlustinová	SLOVEXIT	2,825	1.09
Milan Pova	Communist Party of Slovakia	1,896	0.73
Total		258,545	100.00

=== Banská Bystrica Region ===
Candidate	Party	Votes	%
Ondrej Lunter (incumbent)	Independent	135,971	64.82
Miroslav Suja	Republic	31,465	15.00
Marian Kotleba	People's Party Our Slovakia	19,128	9.12
Roman Malatinec	Rural Party	11,158	5.32
Michal Albert	Brothers of Slovakia	7,223	3.44
Jaroslav Rusina	Independent	2,589	1.23
Peter Plančík	Communist Party of Slovakia	2,234	1.06
Total		209,768	100.00

=== Prešov Region ===
Results by district

Candidate	Party	Votes	%
Milan Majerský (incumbent)	Christian Democratic Movement (Note: Supported by Slovakia Movement, Freedom and Solidarity, For the People, Conservatives – Christian Union and Progressive Slovakia.)	138,819	48.78
Milan Mazurek	Republic	100,131	35.18
Samuel Migaľ	Independent	17,240	6.06
Drahomír Čureja	Independent	9,564	3.36
Monika Lešková	Slovak National Party	4,073	1.43
Judita Laššáková	Direction – Social Democracy (Note: Supported by Brothers of Slovakia.)	3,984	1.40
Marián Geci	Independent	3,702	1.30
Ľubomír Goliaš	Unity of Slavs	2,156	0.76
Ján Stanko	SLOVEXIT	1,865	0.66
Jozef Ištok	Independent	1,832	0.64
Zoltán Kašo	Team Košice	1,228	0.43
Total		284,594	100.00

=== Košice Region ===
Results by district

Candidate	Party	Votes	%
Rastislav Trnka (incumbent)	Independent	76,421	32.01
Marián Porvažník	Progressive Slovakia (Note: Supported by Slovakia Movement, Freedom and Solidarity, Christian Democratic Movement, Democrats, For the People, Civic Conservative Party and Democratic Party – Civic Democrats of Slovakia.)	73,304	30.70
Igor Šimko	Voice – Social Democracy (Note: Supported by Direction – Social Democracy, Republic, Right to Truth, Slovak National Party, Rural Party, Mayors and Independent Candidates and Brothers of Slovakia.)	57,682	24.16
Monika Sofiya Soročinová	Independent	23,409	9.80
Džemal Kodrazi	Independent	4,638	1.94
Tibor Géci	Unity of Slavs	3,319	1.39
Total		238,773	100.00
