= Nový Život =

Nový Život Illésháza
- Municipality
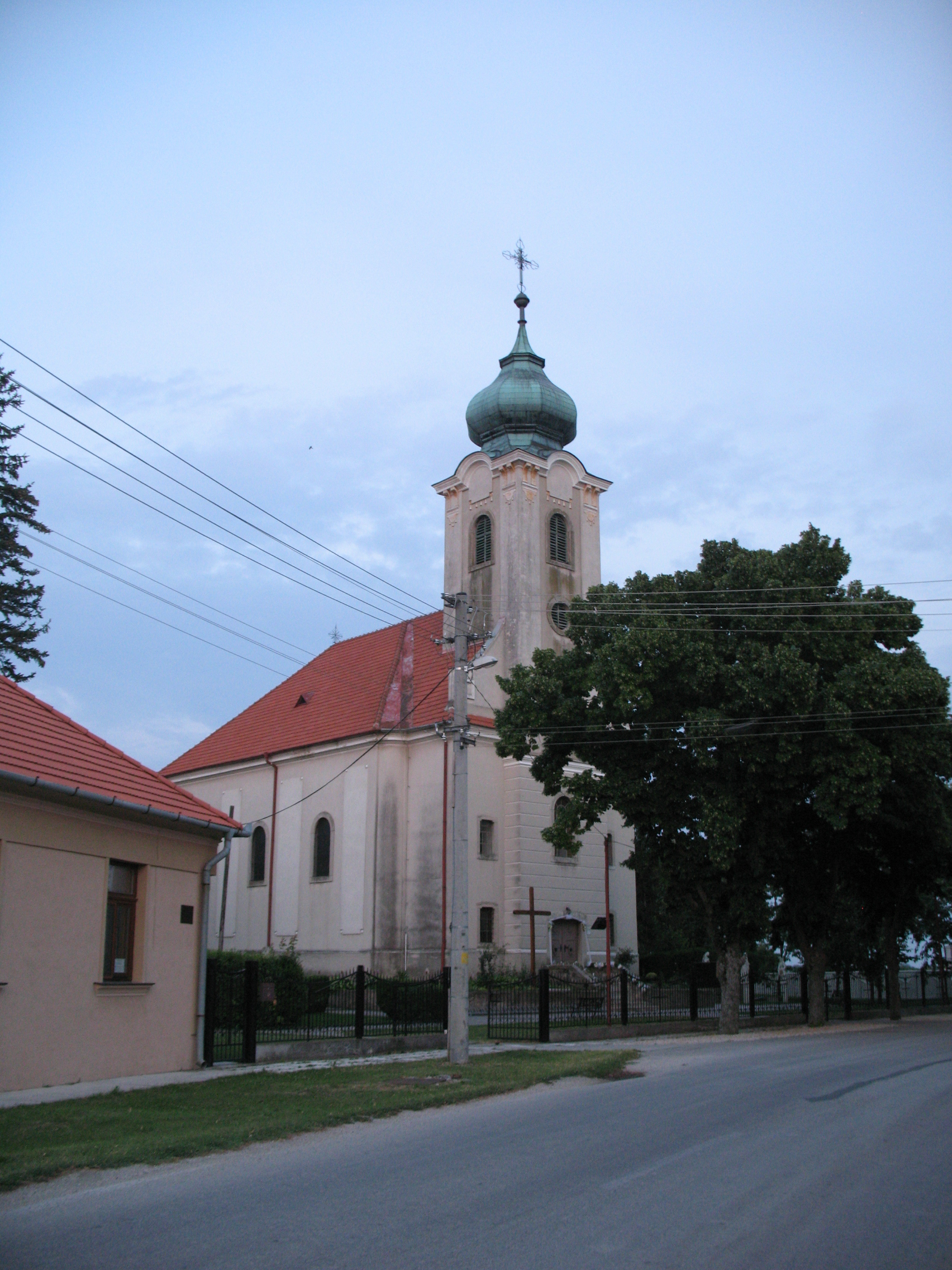

- Flag

- Location of Nový Život in the Trnava Region Location of Nový Život in Slovakia
- Coordinates: 48.12°N 17.47°E
- Country: Slovakia
- Region: Trnava Region
- District: Dunajská Streda District
- First mentioned: 1238

Government
  - Mayor: Tibor Fehér (Party of the Hungarian Coalition)

Area
  - Total: 22.48 km^{2} (8.68 sq mi)
- Elevation: 121 m (397 ft)

Population (2025)
  - Total: 2,298

Ethnicity
  - Hungarians: 85.25%
  - Slovaks: 11.82%
- Time zone: UTC+1 (CET)
  - Summer (DST): UTC+2 (CEST)
- Postal code: 930 38
- Area code: +421 31
- Vehicle registration plate (until 2022): DS
- Website: www.novyzivot.sk

Nový Život (Hungarian: Illésháza, pronounced [ˈilleːʃhaːzɒ]) is a village and municipality in the Dunajská Streda District in the Trnava Region of south-west Slovakia.

== Component villages ==
In Slovak	In Hungarian
Nový Život	Illésháza
Vojtechovce	Bélvata
Tonkovce	Tonkháza
Malý Mager	Kismagyar

== Geography ==
The municipality lies at an altitude of 121 metres (397 ft) and covers an area of 22.48 km^{2} (8.68 sq mi) (2025).

== History ==
In the 9th century, the territory of Nový Život became part of the Kingdom of Hungary. The area where the village is located was first mentioned in 1238 under the Hungarian name Altolutoljafeuld (literally: last land on its other side), whilst the most ancient form of its name was recorded as Elyasvata in 1353.

Outer rural areas preserve the names of erstwhile villages which disappeared over the centuries. Szerhásháza, mentioned in 1464 as Esterháza was the age-old estate of the Esterházy, while Salamon was that of the Illésházy Hungarian noble families. The name Szentpéterföldje (St. Peter’s Land) shows that the one time village had a church consecrated in honour of St. Peter.

Until the end of World War I, it was part of Hungary and fell within the Somorja district of Pozsony County. After the Austro-Hungarian army disintegrated in November 1918, Czechoslovak troops occupied the area. After the Treaty of Trianon in 1920, the village officially became part of Czechoslovakia. In November 1938, the First Vienna Award granted the area to Hungary and it was held by Hungary until 1945. After Soviet occupation in 1945, Czechoslovak administration returned and the village became officially part of Czechoslovakia in 1947. The current Slovak name of the municipality means "New Life" and was given by the communist authorities in 1960, when the four component villages were unified to form the present-day municipality. The Slovak name of Illésháza had earlier been Eliášovce.

== Population ==
Population statistic (10 years)
Year	1995	2005	2015	2025
Count	1934	2155	2257	2298
Difference		+11.42%	+4.73%	+1.81%

Population statistic
Year	2024	2025
Count	2302	2298
Difference		−0.17%

It has a population of 2298 people (31 December 2025).

=== Ethnicity ===
Census 2021 (1+ %)
Ethnicity	Number	Fraction
Hungarian	1599	69.34%
Slovak	730	31.65%
Romani	95	4.11%
Not found out	80	3.46%
Total	2306	

In year 2021 was 2306 people by ethnicity 1599 as Hungarian, 730 as Slovak, 95 as Romani, 80 as Not found out, 9 as Czech, 4 as Ukrainian, 3 as German, 3 as Other, 3 as Greek, 2 as Turkish, 2 as Serbian, 1 as Jewish, 1 as Rusyn, 1 as Moravian, 1 as French and 1 as Croatian.

Note on population: The difference values of population numbers in the table "Population statistic" and in the sections "Ethnicity" & "Religion" is caused by the use of various statistical methods.

=== Religion ===
Census 2021 (1+ %)
Religion	Number	Fraction
Roman Catholic Church	1730	75.02%
None	303	13.14%
Not found out	105	4.55%
Calvinist Church	65	2.82%
Christian Congregations in Slovakia	25	1.08%
Evangelical Church	23	1%
Total	2306	

In year 2021 was 2306 people by religion 1730 from Roman Catholic Church, 303 from None, 105 from Not found out, 65 from Calvinist Church, 25 from Christian Congregations in Slovakia, 23 from Evangelical Church, 19 from Greek Catholic Church, 10 from Old Catholic Church, 7 from Other and not ascertained christian church, 6 from Jehovah's Witnesses, 4 from Ad hoc movements, 3 from Islam, 1 from Jewish community, 1 from Eastern Orthodox Church, 1 from Other, 1 from United Methodist Church, 1 from Buddhism and 1 from Apostolic Church.

In 1910 the village had 571, for the most part, Hungarian inhabitants. At the 2001 Census the recorded population of the village was 2048 while an end-2008 estimate by the Statistical Office put the villages's population at 2,212. As of 2001, 85.25% of its population were Hungarians while 11.82% were Slovaks. Roman Catholicism is the majority religion of the village, its adherents numbering 93.21% of the total population.
