= Jozef Viskupič =

Slovak politician (born 1976)

- Viskupič in 2010

Governor of the Trnava Region
- Incumbent
- Assumed office 4 December 2017
- Preceded by: Tibor Mikuš

Member of the National Council
- In office 8 July 2010 – 5 January 2018

Personal details
- Born: 8 February 1976 (age 50) Trnava, Czechoslovakia
- Party: Progressive Slovakia (since 2024)
- Other political affiliations: OĽaNO (2011–2024)
- Relations: Igor Matovič (cousin)
- Children: 3
- Education: Comenius University; University of Ss. Cyril and Methodius
- Occupation: Politician, manager

Jozef Viskupič (born 8 February 1976) is a Slovak politician who has been governor of the Trnava Region since 2017. One of the four founders of the Ordinary People and Independent Personalities (OĽaNO) movement, he sat in the National Council from 2010 until 2018, when he gave up his seat after being elected regional governor. He was re-elected governor in 2022 and 2026. Since June 2024 he has been a member of Progressive Slovakia, the first regional governor to join the party.

== Early life and education ==
Viskupič was born in Trnava on 8 February 1976. He attended the municipal grammar school on Hviezdoslavova Street in Trnava from 1990 to 1994. He then trained as a teacher of history, civics and ethics at the Faculty of Education of Comenius University in Bratislava (1996–2001), and studied mass media at the Faculty of Mass Media Communication of the University of Ss. Cyril and Methodius in Trnava (1998–2003).

Before entering politics he worked as a project manager at regionPRESS, a Trnava-based publisher of regional weeklies founded by Igor Matovič.

== National politics ==
In the 2010 parliamentary election, Viskupič was one of four members of Matovič's civic association Ordinary People – together with Matovič, Erika Jurinová and Martin Fecko – who ran in the last places on the candidate list of Freedom and Solidarity (SaS). All four were elected thanks to preferential votes; Viskupič moved from 147th to seventh place on the list. The group later broke away from SaS and in 2011 registered as the political party OĽaNO.

He was re-elected on the OĽaNO list in 2012, again from near the bottom of the list. During the 2012–2016 term he chaired the OĽaNO parliamentary caucus. In the 2016 election he ran from 148th place on the OĽaNO–NOVA list and received 23,621 preferential votes. In that term he sat on the special committee overseeing the National Security Authority and the European Affairs Committee, and was vice-chair of the Committee on Culture and Media.

After winning the regional election in November 2017, he gave up his parliamentary seat with effect from 5 January 2018.

== Governor of the Trnava Region ==
=== First term (2017–2022) ===
In the November 2017 regional election, Viskupič ran for governor of the Trnava Region as the joint candidate of OĽaNO, SaS, the Christian Democratic Movement (KDH) and several smaller parties. His programme included zero-based budgeting for the region-run Ján Palárik Theatre in Trnava and a residency programme to attract doctors. He won with 48,584 votes (42.90%), defeating the incumbent governor Tibor Mikuš, who received 30.55%. He took office on 4 December 2017.

When announcing his bid for re-election in 2022, Viskupič presented the rescue of Piešťany Airport from liquidation and a reduction of the region's debt, which he said had been the highest of all Slovak regions, as key results of his first term.

=== Second term (2022–2026) ===
In the October 2022 election, Viskupič ran as the candidate of a broad coalition of fourteen parties led by OĽaNO, SaS and KDH and including the Hungarian-minority party Magyar Fórum, with the additional backing of Progressive Slovakia. He was re-elected with 69,743 votes (38.56%), ahead of the regional vice-governor József Berényi with 21.08%.

In May 2022 he was elected to chair the assembly of the Rába–Danube–Váh European Grouping of Territorial Cooperation, a Slovak–Hungarian cross-border body, for a two-year term starting on 1 July 2022. He has also chaired SK8, the association of Slovakia's eight self-governing regions.

On 12 June 2024 Viskupič joined Progressive Slovakia, after more than a decade in OĽaNO (by then renamed the Slovakia Movement).

=== Third term (since 2026) ===
In the regional election of 24 October 2026, Viskupič ran with the support of Progressive Slovakia, SaS, KDH, the Democrats, the Slovakia Movement, Magyar Fórum and the Civic Conservative Party. His opponents included József Berényi of the Hungarian Alliance. He was re-elected with 103,083 votes (54.04%) on a turnout of 44.38%.

== Electoral history ==
Elections for Governor of the Trnava Region
Year	Supported by	Votes	%	Result
2017	OĽaNO, SaS, KDH and others	48,584	42.90	Elected
2022	OĽaNO, SaS, KDH and others	69,743	38.56	Re-elected
2026	PS, SaS, KDH and others	103,083	54.04	Re-elected

== Personal life ==
Viskupič is married and has three children. He is a cousin of former prime minister Igor Matovič.

Political offices
Preceded by Tibor Mikuš	Governor of the Trnava Region; 2017–present	Incumbent
