= György Gyimesi =

Slovak politician (born 1980)

Member of the National Council
- In office 21 March 2020 – 15 May 2023

Personal details
- Born: Juraj Gyimesi; 24 August 1980 (age 46) Kráľovský Chlmec, Czechoslovakia
- Party: Hungarian Alliance (from 2023); Ordinary People and Independent Personalities (2020–2023)
- Education: Pavel Jozef Šafárik University

György Gyimesi (born 24 August 1980) is a Slovak politician who has been MP of the National Council of Slovakia since 2020.

== Early life ==
György Gyimesi was born on 24 August 1980 in Kráľovský Chlmec. He was born as Juraj Gyimesi but legally changed his given name to György in 2020. His father Július Gyimesi was a physician and served as an MP of the Czechoslovak Federal Assembly from 1990 to 1991. Gyimesi studied public policy at the Pavol Jozef Šafárik University.

=== Political career ===
Gyimesi failed to win a seat in the 2020 Slovak parliamentary election on the list of the Ordinary People and Independent Personalities (OĽaNO). Nonetheless, he became an MP as a replacement for Jaroslav Naď.

In March 2021 Gyimesi conducted negotiations with the Hungarian foreign minister Péter Szijjártó with the aim to amend the Slovak citizenship law, which stipulates that citizens of Slovakia who acquire another citizenship without having a genuine tie to their new country automatically lose their Slovak citizenship. The law was implemented as a countermeasure to the Hungarian law, which makes all "ethnic Hungarians" living abroad eligible for the Hungarian citizenship. The foreign minister of Slovakia Ivan Korčok sharply criticized both Gyimesi and the Hungarian government for their conduct, stressing that the MP had no mandate to conduct such negotiations with a representative of a foreign country. Gyimesi, in turn, accused Korčok of Hungarophobia.

In April 2023, Gyimesi announced departure from OĽaNO over his disagreement with pro-Ukrainian stance of the prime minister Eduard Heger in the Russian invasion of Ukraine. In May 2023, Gyimesi lost his National Council mandate when Naď resigned as the defense minister and returned to the parliament. In the 2023 Slovak parliamentary election, Gyimesi ran on the list of the Hungarian Alliance party, which failed to pass the representation threshold. In late 2023, he became a vice-chair of the Hungarian Alliance. As the vice-chair he argued for an electoral coalition with one of the "sovereigntist" political parties, claiming that the "ethnic politics is dead" in Slovakia.
