= Hungarian Civic Party (Slovakia) =

Hungarian Civic Party Magyar Polgári Párt Maďarská občianska strana
- Abbreviation: MOS, MPP
- Leader: László Nagy
- Founded: 19 February 1990 (as MHI)
- Registered: 25 January 1992
- Dissolved: 22 May 1998
- Preceded by: Hungarian Civic Initiative
- Merged into: Party of the Hungarian Coalition
- Ideology: Hungarian minority interests Liberalism
- Political position: Centre to centre-right
- International affiliation: Liberal International
- Colours: Green

Hungarian Civic Party (Hungarian: Magyar Polgári Párt, Slovak: Maďarská občianska strana) was a political party in Czechoslovakia and Slovakia between 1992 and 1998. It was the party of the Hungarian minority. The party was created as the successor of the Hungarian Civic Initiative, a coalition partner of the former Public Against Violence. In May 1998, the party merged into the newly formed Party of the Hungarian Coalition. In 2009, their leader would leave the SMK-MKP to join the more liberal Most–Híd.
