= Edita Pfundtner =

Slovak politician and lawyer

State Secretary at the Justice
- In office 2018–2020
- In office 2022–2023

Member of the National Council
- In office 2010–2012
- In office 2014–2018

Personal details
- Born: 30 January 1973 (age 53) Bratislava, Czechoslovakia
- Party: Party of the Hungarian Coalition (2003-2009); Most–Híd (2009-2012)
- Education: Comenius University

Edita Pfundtner (Hungarian: Pfundtner Edit; born 30 January 1973) is a Slovak lawyer and politician. From 2010 to 2012 and again from 2014 to 2018 she was a Member of the National Council. From 2018 to 2020 and from 2022 to 2023 she Served as the State Secretary at the Ministry of Justice and the office of the Deputy Prime Minister.

== Education and legal career ==
Edita Pfundtner was born in Bratislava on 30 January 1973. She belongs to the Hungarian minority in Slovakia. She studied law at the Comenius University graduating in 1997. Following her graduation, she worked as an in-house counsel for the Alianz insurance company. In 2004 she joined the bar and became an attorney.

== Political career ==
From 2003 to 2009 Pfundtner was a member of the Party of the Hungarian Coalition without holding an elected office. In 2009, she was among the founders of the Most–Híd party. In 2010 Slovak parliamentary election, she failed to win a seat, but nonetheless became an MP as a replacement for Rudolf Chmel, who vacated his seat to become the Minister of Culture. She again failed to win a mandate in the 2012 Slovak parliamentary election, but rejoined the parliament in May 2014, this time as a replacement for Andrej Hrnčiar. She served the remainder of her term as an independent MP, having left Most-Híd after the 2012 elections.

In 2018, she joined the government as a State Secretary at the Ministry of Justice. In 2019 she unsuccessfully ran for the Justice of the Constitutional Court of Slovakia. From 2020 to 2022 she served as the Director of the Center for International Protection of Children and Youth. In 2022 she again joined the government as a State Secretary at the Ministry of Justice and in May 2023 as a State Secretary at the Office of the Deputy Prime Minister.
