= Hungarian Forum =

Hungarian Forum Maďarské fórum
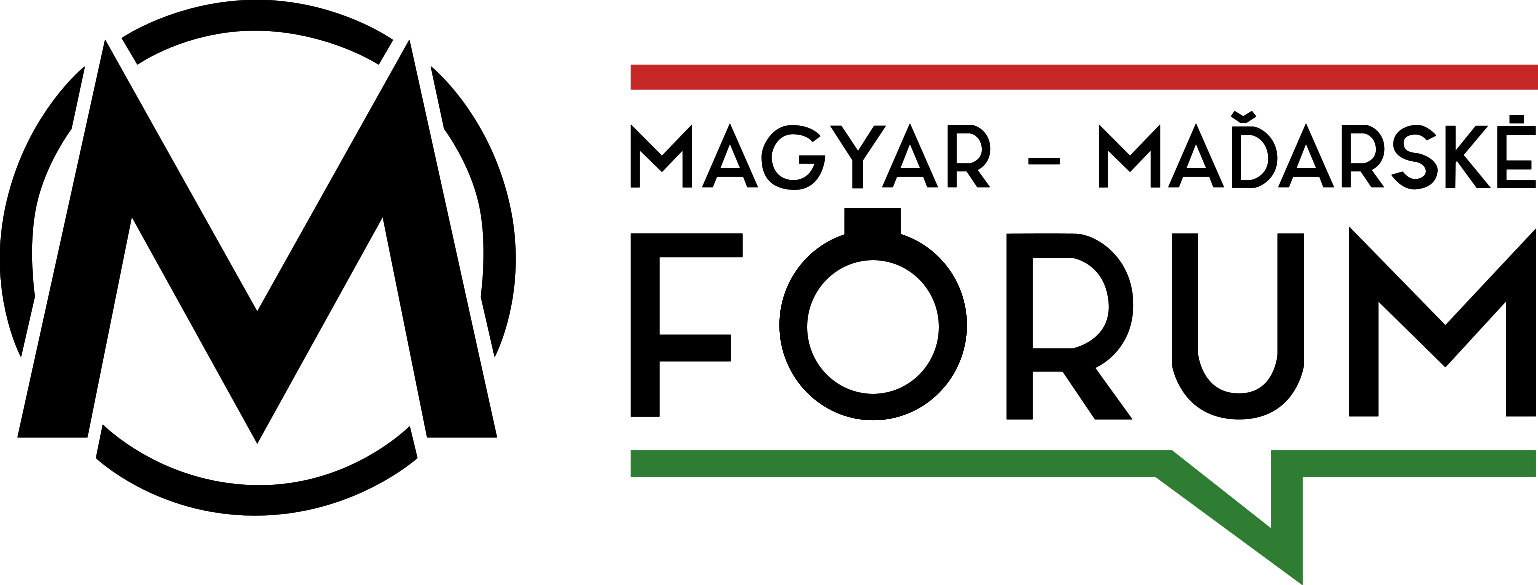
- Abbreviation: MF
- Chairman: Zsolt Simon
- Deputy Chairpersons: Zsolt Gál; Attila Mikolai
- Founded: 28 February 2019
- Split from: Most–Híd
- Headquarters: Padarovce 82, 98023 Padarovce
- Membership (2022): 33 ▲
- Ideology: Hungarian minority interests Pro-Europeanism
- Political position: Centre-right
- Colours: Red; White; Green
- National Council: 0 / 150
- European Parliament: 0 / 15
- Regional governors (Note: OĽANO politician Jozef Viskupič, the governor of the Trnava Region, was backed by the party.): 0 / 8
- Regional deputies: 0 / 419
- Mayors: 6 / 2,904
- Local councillors (Note: Including one councillor elected in a coalition with KDH, OKS, SaS and Tím Kraj Nitra.): 48 / 20,523

Website
- magyarforum.sk madarskeforum.sk

The Hungarian Forum (between 2023 and 2025 known as the Forum Slovak: Magyar Fórum; previously styled as Magyar Fórum – Maďarské fórum; MF) is a Slovak political party which was established on 28 February 2019. Its founder and chairman is the former minister and politician of SMK–MKP and Most–Híd, Member of the National Council, Zsolt Simon.

The main goal of the party is to ensure the parliamentary representation of Hungarians in Slovakia and to use it as a tool for actions so that people from the Hungarian community are equal citizens of a democratic Slovakia.

== History ==
The party was founded in February 2019 by Zsolt Simon, a non-attached member of the National Council of the Slovak Republic, who resigned from the Most–Híd party in 2016 due to its entry into the governing coalition with the Smer-SD and SNS parties.

Prior to the 2020 elections, the party intensively negotiated a joint list of candidates with the remaining four parties of the Hungarian minority (SMK-MKP, MOST-HÍD, MKDA-MKDSZ and Spolupatričnosť), but by the end of October 2019 the parties had not reached an agreement. The problem is a different view of the possibility of cooperation with current government parties. The Hungarian Forum refuses to cooperate with SMER, SNS and ĽSNS. If there is no joint coalition candidacy of all five parties, the Hungarian Forum wants to run with the SMK and the Co-operation under the name Hungarian Community Co-operation. In November 2019, they announced that they were preparing a three-party coalition with the SMK and the MKÖ-MKS.

== Party program ==
The party has as its priorities a change in the preamble of the Constitution of Slovakia, a change in the financing of local governments, as well as a change in the territorial and legal division of the country (counties, districts). The Hungarian Forum wants to push for the southern regions to receive an average amount of public investment and expenditure, from infrastructure development, through the support of industrial parks and private investment, to the promotion of Hungarian cultural life. In the cultural field, it requires the unrestricted use of the Hungarian mother tongue, both verbally and in writing, in the regions where the minority lives, and in official relations its equivalence with the official Slovak language.

Presidency currently up to 6 November 2019:

- Zsolt Simon - Chairman
  - Erzsébet Janits - Vice-Chairman
  - Zsolt Gál - Vice-Chairman
    - Viktor Bugár - Member of the Presidency
    - Tamás Bojtoš - Member of the Presidency
    - Dániel Miklóš - Member of the Presidency

== Election results ==
=== National Council ===
Election	Leader	Votes	%	Rank	Seats	+/–	Status
2023	Zsolt Simon	3,486	0.1%	16th	0 / 150	New	Extra-parliamentary
