= Zsolt Simon =

Slovak politician (born 1970)

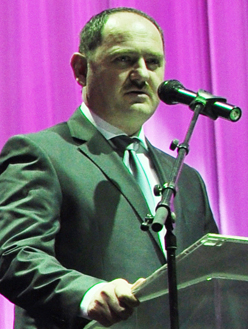
- Simon in 2012

Minister of Agriculture and Rural Development
- In office 16 October 2002 – 4 July 2006
- Prime Minister: Mikuláš Dzurinda
- Preceded by: Pavol Koncoš
- Succeeded by: Miroslav Jureňa
- In office 9 July 2010 – 4 April 2012
- Prime Minister: Iveta Radičová
- Preceded by: Vladimír Chovan
- Succeeded by: Ľubomír Jahnátek

Member of the National Council
- In office 4 July 2006 – 8 July 2010
- In office 4 April 2012 – 20 March 2020

Personal details
- Born: August 26, 1970 (age 56) Rimavská Sobota, Czechoslovakia
- Party: Party of the Hungarian Coalition (1999-2009); Most–Híd(2009-2016); Hungarian Forum(2019-)
- Children: 2
- Education: Mendel University Brno

Zsolt Simon (born 26 August 1970) is a Slovak politician. He served as the Minister of Agriculture from 2002 to 2006 and again from 2010 to 2012. From 2006 to 2010 and from 2012 to 2020 he was a Member of the National Council.

== Early life ==
Simon was born in Rimavská Sobota. He is of Hungarian ethnicity. He studied agriculture at the Mendel University, graduating in 1993. Following graduation, he ran a farm and worked as a manager in Agriculture. In 1999, he joined the Party of the Hungarian Coalition.

== Political career ==
Following the 2002 Slovak parliamentary election, Simon won a mandate, which he did not take due to becoming a Minister of Agriculture in the Dzurinda's Second Cabinet. He was elected a Deputy again in the 2006 Slovak parliamentary election. While serving as an opposition MP, he left the Party of the Hungarian Coalition to co-found the Most–Híd party. He was again elected in the 2010 Slovak parliamentary election, following which he again served as an Agriculture minister in the Radičová's Cabinet. From 2012 to 2020 he was an opposition MP. Following the 2016 Slovak parliamentary election, he left the Most-Híd party due to his opposition to a coalition agreement with Direction – Slovak Social Democracy. In 2019 he established a new party Hungarian Forum, which failed to pass the representation threshold in the 2020 Slovak parliamentary election.

== Personal life ==
Simon is married and has two sons.
