= Gymnázium Kráľovský Chlmec =

Gymnázium Kráľovský Chlmec Királyhelmeci Gimnázium
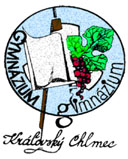

Location
- Kráľovský Chlmec; Slovakia
- Coordinates: 48°24′55″N 21°58′35″E

Information
- Type: Public
- Established: 1949
- Principal: PaedDr. Gábor Dobos
- Website: Gymnázium Kráľovský Chlmec

Gymnázium Kráľovský Chlmec (hun. Királyhelmeci Gimnázium) is a high school in Kráľovský Chlmec, Slovakia. It was founded in 1949 and it offers education in Slovak and Hungarian language.

It is one of the major educational institutions in the region.
