= Pál Csáky =

Slovak politician (born 1956)

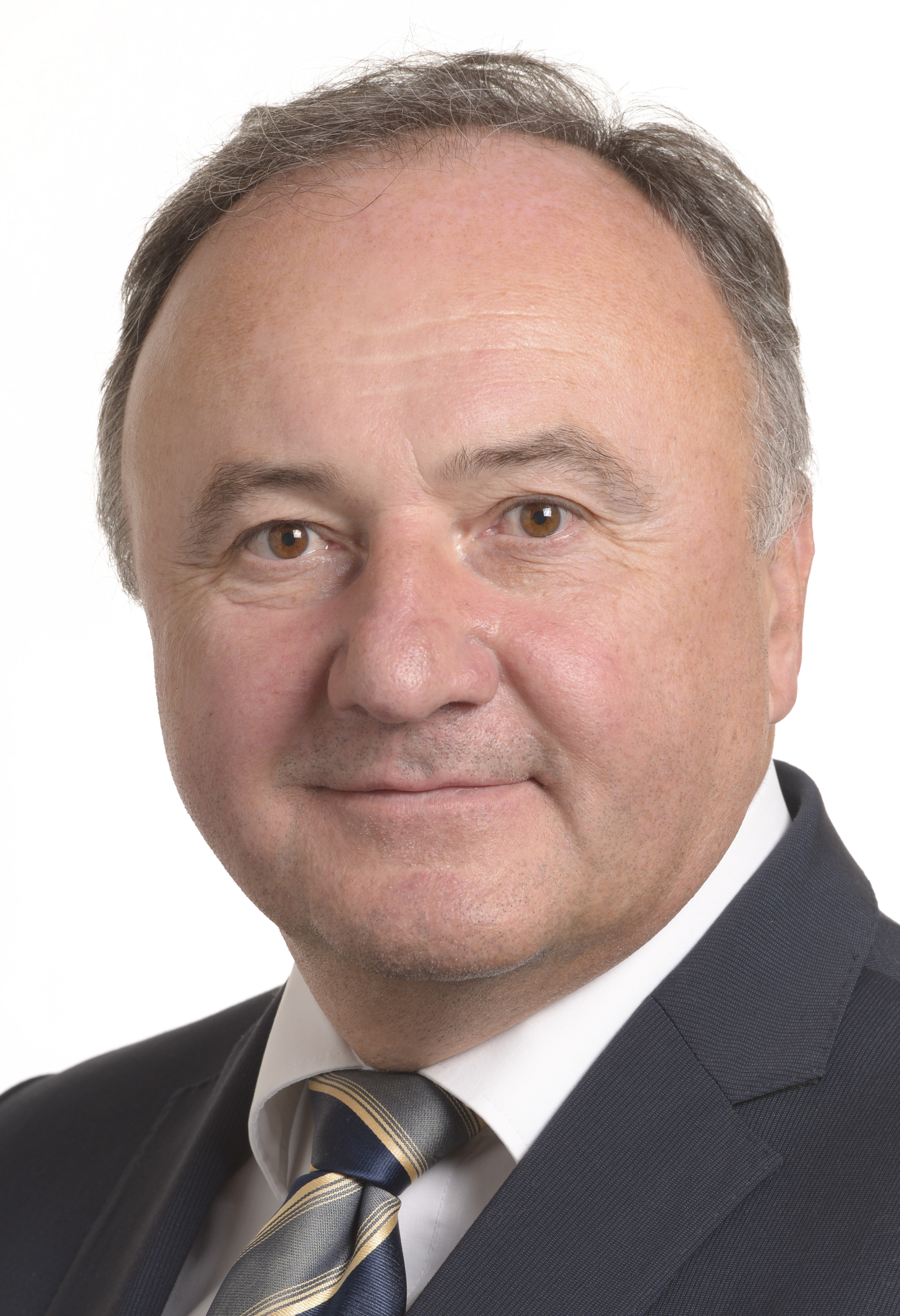

Member of the National Council
- In office 4 July 2006 – 12 June 2010

Deputy Prime Minister of Slovakia
- In office 30 October 1998 – 4 July 2006

Personal details
- Born: 21 March 1956 (age 70) Šahy, Czechoslovakia
- Party: Party of the Hungarian Coalition

Pál Csáky (born 21 March 1956) is a Slovak politician, a member of Hungarian minority in Slovakia and the country's former Deputy Prime Minister for European affairs, human rights and minorities.

== Life and career ==
Born in Šahy, Czechoslovakia (now Slovakia), Csáky studied at the University of Pardubice. Csáky was an activist for the Hungarian minority in Czechoslovakia since 1977. His political activity started in 1989, and since 1990 he has been a member of National Council (Slovakia's parliament). The Party of the Hungarian Coalition was named a member of the governing coalition in 1998, and Csáky became a member of several advisory bodies and ministerial councils.

On 31 March 2007, Csáky was elected president of the Party of the Hungarian Coalition. In 2010, he was succeeded by József Berényi. He is married and has four daughters. He was elected as a Member of the European Parliament in the 2014 European Parliament election.
