= Deportations of Hungarians to the Czech lands =

1945–47 campaign after World War II

Deportations of Hungarians to the Czech lands were a series of mass deportations of Hungarian population from southern Slovakia to Czech lands by Czechoslovak authorities. Deportations took place during the period from 1945 to 1947.

== Deportations ==
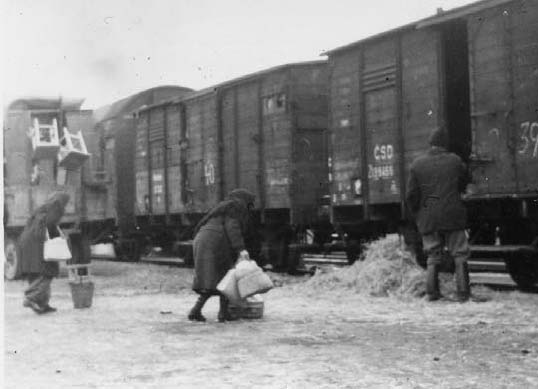
Hungarians forcibly relocated from Gúta (Kolárovo) unpacking their belongings from train in Mladá Boleslav, Czechoslovakia, February, 1947

Presidential Decree No. 071/1945 Coll. ("concerning the work duty of persons that had lost Czechoslovak citizenship") and No. 88/1945 Coll. ("concerning universal work duty") authorized the Czechoslovak administration to draft people into paid labor service for the maximum period of one year in order to redress some of the war damages. Under the disguise of "labor recruiting", the deportation of Hungarians from South Slovakia began to the recently vacated Czech borderlands. Those who could not prove that they either remained loyal to Czechoslovakia during the war, or that they took part in liberation, or that they were subject to Nazi terror, also had their property confiscated under Presidential Decree No. 108/1945 Coll. ("concerning the confiscation of enemy property and on the Fund for National Restoration"). The transit trains were labelled as "voluntary agricultural workers". In fact, the real goal was to alter the ethnic composition of South Slovakia. These "labor recruitings" were named by Czech historian Karel Kaplan as "internal colonizations", and according to him their "political aim... was to transfer a part of the Hungarian minority away from the Hungarian border and to destroy it as a compact territorial unit. This colonization also had an immediate industrial goal – to provide the depopulated areas with a workforce".

Between July and August 1946, under the slogan "Slovak agricultural labor assisting the Czech lands", more Hungarians were deported to Czech lands. Eventually, 40,000-45,000-50,000 Hungarians were deported to Czech territories recently cleared of Sudeten Germans, but also to the other areas where labor force was required. While their properties in Slovakia were confiscated, they obtained the former Sudeten Germans' properties. According to the Slovak National Archives, 41,666 Hungarians had been deported from southern Slovakia. Hungarians who stayed in Slovakia became the targets of the Slovak assimilation efforts.

Number of Hungarians deported to the Czech lands from South Slovakia
District	Original number of Hungarians (1930) (Note: In 1930, according to the Czechoslovak census)	Relocated Hungarian families	Relocated Hungarian persons
Šamorín (now part of DSD)	27,030	767	3,951
Dunajská Streda District	39,070	698	3,551
Komárno	53,154	1,483	6,694
Galanta	41,474	874	3,972
Šaľa	28,431	694	2,931
Nové Zámky	19,625	313	1,391
Hurbanovo (now part of Komárno District)	36,940	966	3,960
Štúrovo (now part of Nové Zámky District)	39,483	1,008	3,956
Želiezovce (now part of Levice District)	24,164	864	3,282
Levice	12,190	198	675
Veľký Krtíš	11,023	97	437
Jesenské	25,195	547	2,156
Tornaľa (now part of Revúca District)	17,701	631	2,615
Rožňava	14,767	100	380
Spiš	16,737	83	390
Kráľovský Chlmec (now part of Trebišov District)	24,514	116	590
Totals	448,481	9,610	41,666

== See also ==
- Czechoslovak–Hungarian population exchange
- Slovakization
- Occupation of Southern Slovakia
- Hungarians in Slovakia

== Bibliography ==
- Breuning, Eleonore C.M.; Lewis, Jill; Pritchard, Gareth, eds. (2005). Power and the people: a social history of Central European politics, 1945-56. Manchester University Press. ISBN 978-0-7190-7069-3.
- Kamusella, Tomasz (2009). The Politics of Language and Nationalism in Modern Central Europe. Basingstoke, UK (Foreword by Professor Peter Burke): Palgrave Macmillan. ISBN 978-0-230-55070-4.
- Kaplan, Karel (1987). The short march: the Communist takeover in Czechoslovakia, 1945-1948. C.Hurst & Co. Publishers. ISBN 978-0-905838-96-0.
- Mandelbaum, Michael (2000). The New European Diasporas: National Minorities and Conflict in Eastern Europe. Council on Foreign Relations. ISBN 978-0-87609-257-6.
- Rieber, Alfred J. (2000). Forced Migration in Central and Eastern Europe, 1939-1950. Routledge. ISBN 978-0-7146-5132-3.
- Šutaj, Štefan (2005). Nútené presídlenie Maďarov zo Slovenska do Čiech [Deportation of population of Hungarian nationality out of Slovakia to Bohemia] (PDF) (in Slovak). Prešov: Universum. ISBN 978-80-89046-29-4.
