= Vladimír Chovan =

Slovak politician

Minister of Agriculture of Slovakia
- In office 23 September 2009 – 8 July 2010
- Succeeded by: Zsolt Simon

Personal details
- Born: 26 September 1963 (age 62) Smolenice, Czechoslovakia

Vladimír Chovan (born 26 September 1963) is a Slovak politician who served as Minister of Agriculture of Slovakia from 2009 to 2010.

Chovan replaced Stanislav Becík as a result of to inner-party rivalries and was announced Minister of Agriculture by president Ivan Gašparovič in Fico's First Cabinet, serving from 23 September 2009 until 8 July 2010. He pledges for a change in the Common Agricultural Policy in the European Union. Chovan refused denials that his ministry is involved in corruption.
