= László Gyurovszky =

Slovak politician (born 1959)

Minister of Construction and Regional Development of Slovakia
- In office October 16, 2002 – July 4, 2006
- Preceded by: István Harna
- Succeeded by: Marian Janušek

Personal details
- Born: September 30, 1959 (age 66) Šaľa, Czechoslovakia (present day Slovakia)
- Party: Party of the Hungarian Coalition

László Gyurovszky (Slovak pronunciation: [ˈlaːslɔ ˈɟurɔwski]) is the former Minister of Construction and Regional Development of Slovakia. He graduated from the Faculty of Electrical Engineering of the Slovak Technical College (currently known as Slovak University of Technology). After studies, he worked in chemical industry, in Duslo Šaľa. He began politically active in 1990, when he joined Independent Hungarian Initiative - Hungarian Civic Party as a head of election campaign and spokesman of movement.
