= National Security Bureau (Slovakia) =

Národný bezpečnostný úrad (NBÚ) (National Security Authority in English) is the main body of state administration for the protection of classified information, cipher service and electronic signature. It was established on 1 November 2001. As the National Security Authority it fulfills tasks following the membership of the Slovak Republic in the North Atlantic Treaty Organization and the European Union, provides the protection of foreign classified information submitted to the Slovak Republic in accordance with international agreements, and cooperates with national security authorities of other states and security authorities of international organizations.

National Security Authority is controlled by Special Parliamentary Control Committee for the Control of NSA Activities.

NBÚ Director, JUDr. Roman Konečný, was appointed into office of National Security Authority Director by National Council of the Slovak Republic on June 1, 2019.
