= 2026 Slovak local elections =

The Slovak local elections took place on the 24 October 2026, together with the regional elections.
