= Kráľovský Chlmec =

Kráľovský Chlmec Királyhelmec
- Municipality
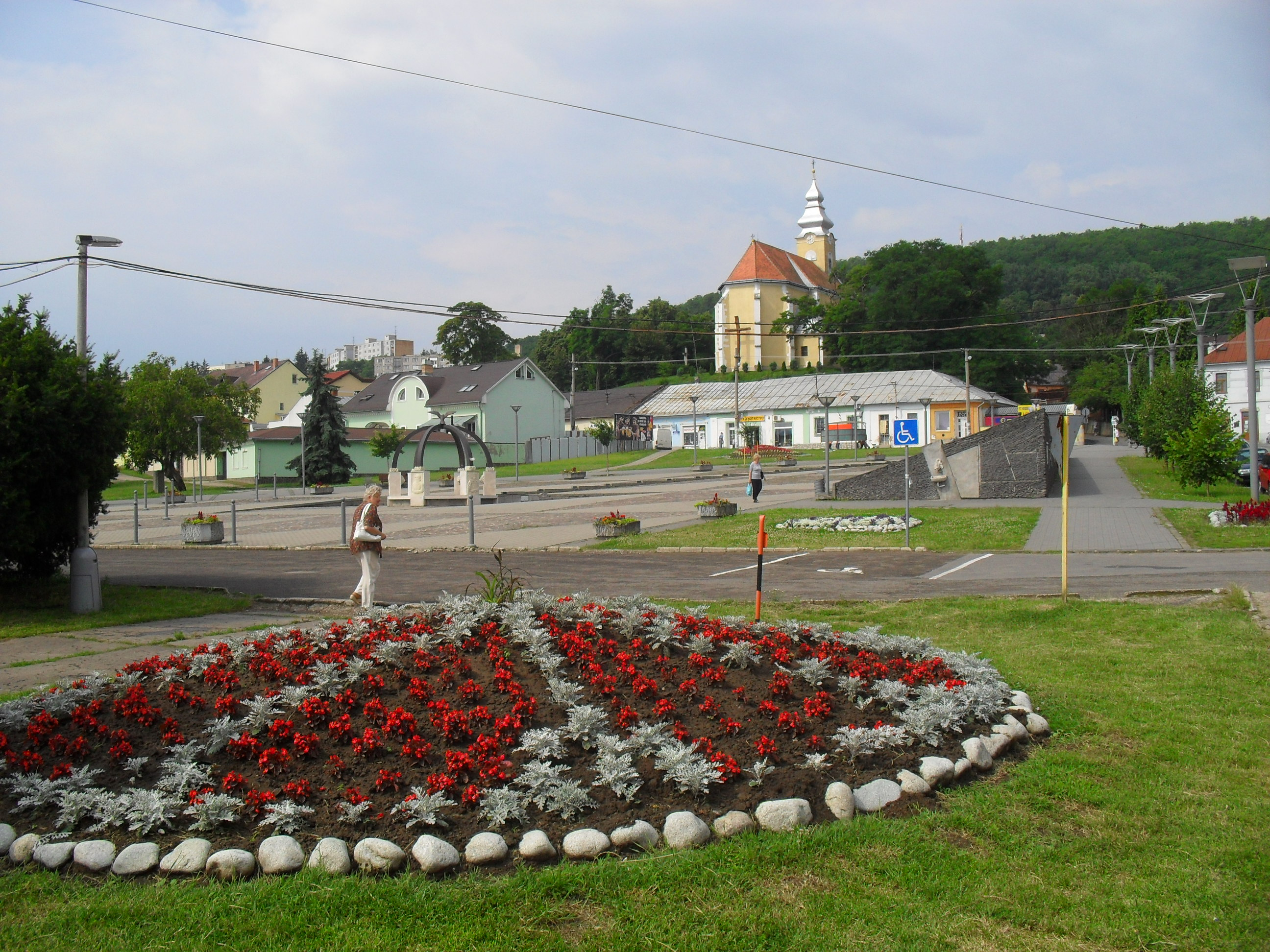
- Town centre

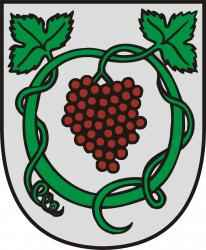
- Flag Coat of arms

- Location of Kráľovský Chlmec in the Košice Region Location of Kráľovský Chlmec in Slovakia
- Coordinates: 48.42°N 21.97°E
- Country: Slovakia
- Region: Košice Region
- District: Trebišov District
- First mentioned: 1214

Government
  - Mayor: Károly Pataky

Area
  - Total: 23.80 km^{2} (9.19 sq mi)
- Elevation: 120 m (390 ft)

Population (2025)
  - Total: 7,229
- Time zone: UTC+1 (CET)
  - Summer (DST): UTC+2 (CEST)
- Postal code: 770 1
- Area code: +421 56
- Vehicle registration plate (until 2022): TV
- Website: www.kralovskychlmec.org

Kráľovský Chlmec (Slovak pronunciation: [ˈkraːʎɔwskiː ˈxl̩mets]; until 1948 Kráľovský Chlumec, Hungarian: Királyhelmec) is a town in the Trebišov District in the Košice Region of south-eastern Slovakia. It has a population of 7,462.

== Etymology ==
The name means "Royal Hill". Slovak chlm, Czech chlum, Polish chełm are derived from a Proto-Slavic chъlmъ - a hill, chlmec - a smaller hill, an elevated location.

== History ==
The town was first mentioned in 1214 as Helmech. In 1848-1849, residents of Kráľovský Chlmec took part in the Civic Revolution and War of Independence. After the Treaty of Trianon in 1920, the town became part of Czechoslovakia. It was annexed again by Hungary in 1938 as a result of the First Vienna Award. After the Second world war it became part of Czechoslovakia again in 1945, officially in 1947, according to the Paris Peace Treaties.

== Geography ==
The municipality lies at an altitude of 120 metres (390 ft) and covers an area of 23.80 km^{2} (9.19 sq mi) (2025).

It is located in the southern part of the Eastern Slovak Lowland, only around 5 kilometres (3 mi) north of Hungarian and 12 kilometres (7 mi) west of Ukrainian border. The regional capital Košice is 90 kilometres (56 mi) away.

== Demographics ==
Historical population
Year	Pop.	±%
1970	5,344	—
1980	6,358	+19.0%
1991	7,963	+25.2%
2001	8,031	+0.9%
2011	7,698	−4.1%
2021	7,489	−2.7%
Source: Censuses

Population statistic (10 years)
Year	1995	2005	2015	2025
Count	8278	7938	7611	7229
Difference		−4.10%	−4.11%	−5.01%

Population statistic
Year	2024	2025
Count	7322	7229
Difference		−1.27%

It has a population of 7229 people (31 December 2025).

=== Ethnicity ===
Census 2021 (1+ %)
Ethnicity	Number	Fraction
Hungarian	5778	77.15%
Slovak	1971	26.31%
Romani	629	8.39%
Not found out	296	3.95%
Total	7489	

In year 2021 was 7489 people by ethnicity 5778 as Hungarian, 1971 as Slovak, 629 as Romani, 296 as Not found out, 21 as Czech, 15 as Ukrainian, 14 as Rusyn, 5 as Chinese, 5 as Italian, 5 as Other, 4 as Jewish, 3 as Russian, 3 as Austrian, 3 as German, 2 as Vietnamese, 2 as Serbian, 2 as Romanian, 1 as Turkish and 1 as Polish.

Note on population: The difference values of population numbers in the table "Population statistic" and in the sections "Ethnicity" & "Religion" is caused by the use of various statistical methods.

=== Religion ===
Census 2021 (1+ %)
Religion	Number	Fraction
Roman Catholic Church	2941	39.27%
Calvinist Church	1662	22.19%
None	1436	19.17%
Greek Catholic Church	835	11.15%
Not found out	289	3.86%
Jehovah's Witnesses	157	2.1%
Evangelical Church	100	1.34%
Total	7489	

In year 2021 was 7489 people by religion 2941 from Roman Catholic Church, 1662 from Calvinist Church, 1436 from None, 835 from Greek Catholic Church, 289 from Not found out, 157 from Jehovah's Witnesses, 100 from Evangelical Church, 14 from Eastern Orthodox Church, 14 from Other and not ascertained christian church, 11 from Other, 8 from Jewish community, 5 from Buddhism, 4 from United Methodist Church, 3 from Old Catholic Church, 3 from Christian Congregations in Slovakia, 1 from New Apostolic Church, 1 from Islam, 1 from Church of the Brethren, 1 from Seventh-day Adventist Church, 1 from Church of Jesus Christ of Latter-day Saints, 1 from Apostolic Church and 1 from Ad hoc movements.

== Education ==
Gymnázium Kráľovský Chlmec The Royal Grammar School Chlmec opened in 1949. Teaches both in Slovak and Hungarian language.

== Notable people ==
=== People born in the town ===
- Mihály Helmeczy (1788) – Hungarian writer and language reformer.
- Jenő Kemecsey (28 December 1862) – writer and journalist.
- Ilona Aczél (7 November 1884) – actress.
- László Dobos (28 October 1930) – writer.
- Júlia Szabó (1939) – art historian.
- Gyula Bodnár (1948) – journalist, writer and editor.
- László Kocsis (1949) – archaeologist and historian of antiquity.
- Viktor Kopasz – fine-art photographer based in Prague.
- Csongor Kassai (1972) – actor.
- Katalin Stubendek (1972) – actress.
- Dino Benjamin (1996) – actor.

=== Other people associated with the town ===
- György Gyimesi – writer and hunter.
- István Helmeczi Komoróczi – Reformed bishop in Oradea and author of religious works in the 17th and 18th centuries.
- László Mécs – priest and poet who lived in Kráľovský Chlmec from 1930 to 1944. His mother is buried in the town.
- Anna Illés – musician.

== Twin towns — sister cities ==
Kráľovský Chlmec is twinned with:

- Ferencváros (Budapest), Hungary
- Felsőzsolca, Hungary
- Kisvárda, Hungary
- Kanjiža, Serbia
- Rakovník, Czech Republic
- Sfântu Gheorghe, Romania
- Berehove, Ukraine
