= József Berényi =

Slovak politician

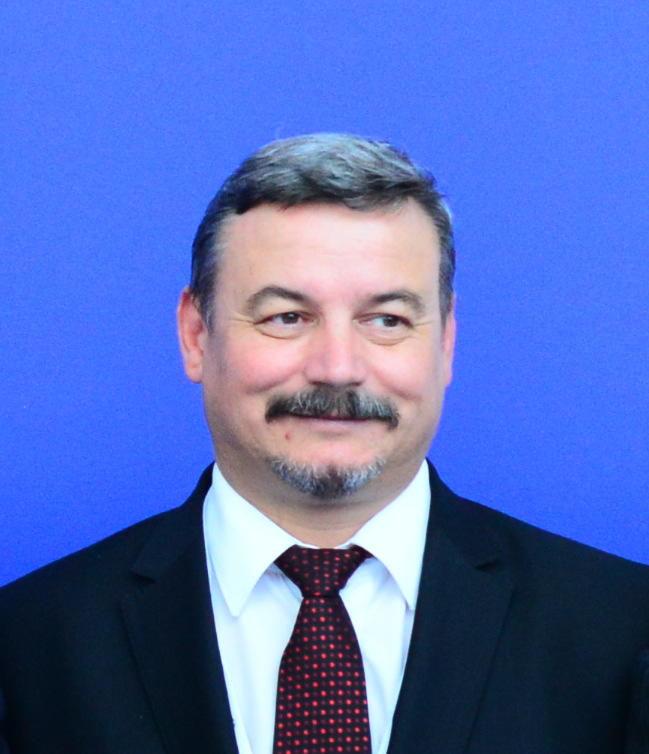

Chairman of the Party of the Hungarian Coalition
- In office 2010–2016
- Preceded by: Pál Csáky
- Succeeded by: József Menyhárt

Member of the National Council of the Slovak Republic
- In office 2006–2010
- In office 2002–2002

Member of the Slovak National Council
- In office 1990–1992

Personal details
- Born: 6 June 1967 (age 59) Okoč, Czechoslovakia
- Party: Party of the Hungarian Coalition
- Education: Comenius University in Bratislava; Central European University

József Berényi (born 6 June 1967) is a Hungarian minority politician from Slovakia. He was the Chairman of the Party of the Hungarian Coalition of Slovakia in 2010-2016.

== Biography ==
From 1994 to 1995, Berényi was a researcher for The New School. In 1995, he became a foreign political secretary for Fidesz. Later, he served as an advisor to the Minister of Construction and Region Development and Director of the Regional Development Department of Slovakia. In 2002, Berényi became State Secretary of the Ministry of Foreign Affairs.

Berényi is married with two children.
