= Hungarian Alliance (Slovak political party) =

Hungarian Alliance Maďarská Aliancia (Slovak) Magyar Szövetség (Hungarian)
- Abbreviation: Szövetség–Aliancia
- Chairman: László Gubík
- Deputy Chairman: Tibor Csenger; Péter Őry
- Founder: Béla Bugár (SMK-MKP); Edit Bauer; Gábor Zászlós (MKÖ-MKS)
- Founded: 1994/2019/2023 (Note: 1994 as Hungarian Coalition, 22 May 1998 as SMK-MKP, 22 October 2019 as MKÖ-MKS, 2 October 2021 as Alliance and 9 December 2023 as Hungarian Alliance)
- Merger of: Hungarian Christian Democratic Movement; Coexistence; Hungarian Civic Party (SMK-MKP)
- Preceded by: MKÖ-MKS (Alliance, legally)
- Headquarters: Čajakova 4048/8; 811 05 Bratislava
- Membership (2023): ▼10,285
- Ideology: Hungarian minority interests Hungarian nationalism National conservatism Pro-Europeanism
- Political position: Centre-right
- European affiliation: European People's Party
- International affiliation: Centrist Democrat International (observer)
- Colours: Red; White; Green
- Slogan: «Hungarians. Nationalities. Regions.» (Hungarian: «Magyarok. Nemzetiségek. Regiók.») (Slovak: «Maďari. Národnosti. Regióny.»)
- National Council: 0 / 150
- European Parliament: 0 / 15
- Regional governors (Note: Independent politicians Rastislav Trnka, the governor of the Košice Region, and Ondrej Lunter, the governor of the Banská Bystrica Region, were backed by the party.): 0 / 8
- Regional deputies (Note: Including 16 deputies nominated by HLAS–SD/SMER–SD in the Prešov Region backed by the Alliance. In addition, they also endorsed 11 deputies in the Žilina Region.): 70 / 419
- Mayors (Note: Including 41 mayors elected in coalitions.): 263 / 2,904
- Local councillors (Note: Including 69 councillors elected in coalitions.): 1,765 / 20,523

Website
- www.madarska-aliancia.sk www.szovetseg.sk

The Hungarian Alliance (Slovak: Maďarská Aliancia; Hungarian: Magyar Szövetség, Szövetség–Aliancia) is a political party in Slovakia for the ethnic Hungarian minority, previously known simply as the "Alliance", it was founded when "Party of the Hungarian Community" and Most–Híd merged into "Hungarian Community Togetherness". It is led by László Gubík since September 2024.

== History ==
=== Party of the Hungarian Coalition ===
Logo of the Party of the Hungarian Coalition

The SMK-MKP party was founded as Party of the Hungarian Coalition (Hungarian: Magyar Koalíció Pártja, Slovak: Strana maďarskej koalície) in 1998 in response to an anti-coalition law passed. The law prevented parties from forming electoral cartels at election time, which small parties had used to overcome the 5% electoral threshold. Three parties representing the Hungarian minority had formed such a cartel, called 'Hungarian Coalition' in the 1994 election, and had won 10.2% of the vote. To comply with the new law, the three parties – the Hungarian Christian Democratic Movement, Coexistence, and the Hungarian Civic Party – merged to form the Party of the Hungarian Coalition.

Following the 2002 parliamentary election in Slovakia, the Party of the Hungarian Coalition joined the Slovak governing coalition for the second time (after the 1998–2002 term), obtained 321,069 votes (11.16% of all votes), and was the most stable political party in the governing coalition. At the EU parliament election in 2004 the party won 13.24% of the vote.

The party had 4 ministers (Pál Csáky – Deputy Prime Minister for European Integration and Minority Rights, László Miklós – Minister of Environment, László Gyurovszky – Minister of Construction and Regional Development and Zsolt Simon – Minister of Agriculture) and 6 state secretaries (Ministry of Finance, Ministry of Education, Ministry of Economy, Ministry of Culture, Ministry of Foreign Affairs and Ministry of Construction and Regional Development) in the Slovak government. Béla Bugár, the president of the Party of the Hungarian Coalition at that time, was the Vice President of the National Council of the Slovak Republic.

In the parliamentary election of 17 June 2006, the party won 11.7% of the popular vote and 20 out of 150 seats, but lost its participation in the government.

==== Decline ====
Logo of the Party of the Hungarian Community

In 2009, a moderate faction led by high-ranking SMK-MKP members founded Most–Híd. In the parliamentary election of 12 June 2010, the party missed the 5% border needed for participation in parliament by receiving 4.33% and lost its position in parliament. The SMK-MKP also proved unable to obtain 5% of the votes in the 2012 parliamentary election. On 22 September 2012, the party was renamed to Party of the Hungarian Community (Hungarian: Magyar Közösség Pártja, Slovak: Strana maďarskej komunity).

In the 2014 European elections, SMK–MKP came in seventh place nationally, receiving 6.53% of the vote and electing 1 MEP. In the 2019 European elections, SMK–MKP fell just short of the 5% threshold with 4.96% thus losing their MEP.

=== Hungarian Community Togetherness ===
Összefogás–Spolupatričnosť (Unity) was founded in the autumn of 2019, citing disputes between the Hungarian parties as a reason for its formation, which could have caused the Hungarian minority not to be represented on the National Council after the 2020 Slovak parliamentary elections. Former Member of the European Parliament for SMK-MKP, Edit Bauer, and former Deputy Chairman of Hungarian Civic Party (MNI), Gábor Zászlós, were instrumental in the formation of the party.

In connection with the upcoming parliamentary elections, the members of Összefogás–Spolupatričnosť negotiated an electoral cooperation with four other ethnic Hungarian parties (Most–Híd, SMK-MKP, MKDA-MKDSZ, MF-MF). On 24 November 2019, Összefogás–Spolupatričnosť approved the joint action of the Hungarian parties in the parliamentary elections. Összefogás–Spolupatričnosť was then transformed into MKÖ-MKS, and gained 30 seats on the candidate list. Szabolcs Mózes, the party president, ran second on the list, Örs Orosz, the party vice president, ran sixth, and József Nagy, a former member of the European Parliament, ran ninth. Mózes stated that they were joining to ensure the representation of the Hungarian minority and to contribute to the change of government and the removal of the SMER-SD party from power. Eventually, SMK-MKP and the Hungarian Forum agreed to run on the Összefogás–Spolupatričnosť list which renamed themselves to Hungarian Community Togetherness (Hungarian: Magyar Közösségi Összefogás, Slovak: Maďarská komunitná spolupatričnosť; MKÖ-MKS). They only reached 3.91% and Most–Híd got 2.05% in the 2020 parliamentary election. This was the first election, in which no Hungarian minority party reached the 5% threshold.

After their failure, MKÖ-MKS, SMK-MKP, and Most–Híd entered into negotiations about further cooperation. On 20 August 2020, they signed a declaration of cooperation in Komárno, a town in southwestern Slovakia. In March 2021, they announced that the negotiations had been successful, and that a new party "Szövetség – Aliancia" would be established. The new party would have three officers: a chairman nominated by SMK-MKP, a chairman of the Republican Council nominated by Most–Híd, and the post of expert vice-chairman nominated by MKÖ-MKS.

=== Alliance ===
Former logo of Szövetség–Aliancia

Szövetség–Aliancia was formed by merging the parties SMK-MKP, Most–Híd, and MKÖ-MKS at the assembly in Šamorín on 2 October 2021. The assembly was preceded by two years of negotiations between five Hungarian political parties about the possibility of cooperation. The goal of joining forces was declared as a return to parliament after the next election, or to be part of the governing coalition. SMK-MKP continued to exist as a faction within Alliance under the backronym Hungarian Conservative Platform (Hungarian: Magyar Konzervatív Platform, MKP).

Krisztián Forró, the then-chairman of the SMK-MKP, became the chairman of the party, and the then-chairman of MKÖ-MKS, Szabolcs Mózes, was elected vice-chairman. In addition, the chairman of the Republican Council, László Sólymos, the then-chairman of the Most–Híd party, was elected, as well as the vice-chairman and chairmen of the platforms, members of the republican presidency, republican committee and mandatory commissions. Sólymos said: "We have laid the foundations for the political, parliamentary representation of the Hungarians, the nationalities and the regions in which we live". The Alliance declared that it would negotiate cooperation with all Slovak parties, such as support for the EU, NATO, and Visegrad Four membership, but would not cooperate with extremist parties like the People's Party Our Slovakia and Direction – Slovak Social Democracy.

In 2023, a few months before the election, however Most–Híd left the united party again over a dispute about allowing former OĽaNO MP György Gyimesi on the list. Leaving only the SMK-MKP and Összefogás factions in the party.

=== Hungarian Alliance ===
On the December 9, 2023 congress, the name of the party was changed to Hungarian Alliance, platforms were abolished and Gyimesi, who joined the party a few days earlier, became deputy chairman. In the second round of the 2024 presidential election, the party endorsed SMER-SD-backed Peter Pellegrini who won the election.

== International affiliations ==
SMK-MKP was said to be an ally of the right-wing ruling party of Hungary Fidesz. The party became a member of the European People's Party (EPP) on 7 June 2000 and later their MEPs joined European People's Party group to which Fidesz belonged too. They also shared their affiliation to the Centrist Democrat International.

After the split and formation of Most–Híd, Fidesz maintained close ties to SMK-MKP. After Fidesz' victory in the 2018 Hungarian parliamentary election József Menyhárt called it "good news" for ethnic Hungarian communities. In the 2019 European Parliament election Viktor Orban even publicly endorsed SMK-MKP. Like their predecessors SMK-MKP and MKÖ-MKS, Alliance is a member of EPP and an observer of the CDI.

== Organisation ==
The primary party organisations made up the basis of the party. By the end of March 2003, the number of these local organisations of SMK-MKP was 521 and the number of members was 10,983. The party congress was the highest body of the party. Between two congresses the highest body of the party is the National Council.

Each elected functionary and body gets elected in form of democratic, secret elections. The party leadership of the districts co-ordinates the work of local institutions within district.

Between 1998 and 2007 the chairman of SMK-MKP was Béla Bugár. The Chairman of the National Council was Zsolt Komlósy, the Parliamentary Group Leader was Gyula Bárdos and Executive Deputy Chairman was Miklós Duray. Pál Csáky was the chairman of the Minister's Club.

On 31 March 2007 Pál Csáky was elected for chairman by the assembly of party, thus succeeding the more moderate Béla Bugár.

Béla Bugár established the party Most–Híd on 30 June 2009, stating that Csáky was too nationalist. His party (its name meaning "bridge" in Hungarian and Slovak) wanted to emphasise cooperation between Hungarians and Slovaks.

After the merger, the three former parties remained platforms within the party responsible for upholding the quotas between the factions with MKP hold the largest portion. After a dispute over the candidacy György Gyimesi, the Most–Híd platform left the party and used the MKDA-MKDSZ party to regain their party status under the new name "Most–Híd 2023".

=== Party of the Hungarian Coalition ===
==== Chairmen ====
- Béla Bugár (1998–2007)
- Pál Csáky (2007–2010)
- József Berényi (2010–2016)
- József Menyhárt (2016–2020)
- Krisztián Forró (2020–2021)

==== Vice-chairmen ====
- József Berényi (2020–2021)
- Iván Farkas (2020–2021)
- Zoltán Ciprusz (2020–2021)

==== Chairmen of the National Council ====
- Péter Köpöncei (2020–2021)

=== Hungarian Community Togetherness ===
==== Chairman ====
- Szabolcs Mózes (2019–2021)

==== Vice-chairman ====
- Örs Orosz (2019–2021)

=== Alliance ===
==== Chairman ====
- Krisztián Forró (2021–2023)

==== Vice-chairman ====
- Szabolcs Mózes (2021–2023)

==== Chairmen of the National Council ====
- László Sólymos (2021–2023)
- Péter Pandy (2023)

=== Hungarian Alliance ===
==== Chairmen ====
- Krisztián Forró (2023–2024)
- László Gubík (2024–)

==== Vice-chairmen ====
- György Gyimesi (2023–2024)
- Örs Orosz (2023–2024)
- Tibor Csenger (2024–)
- Péter Őry (2024–)

==== Chairman of the National Council ====
- Péter Pandy (2023–)

== Election results ==
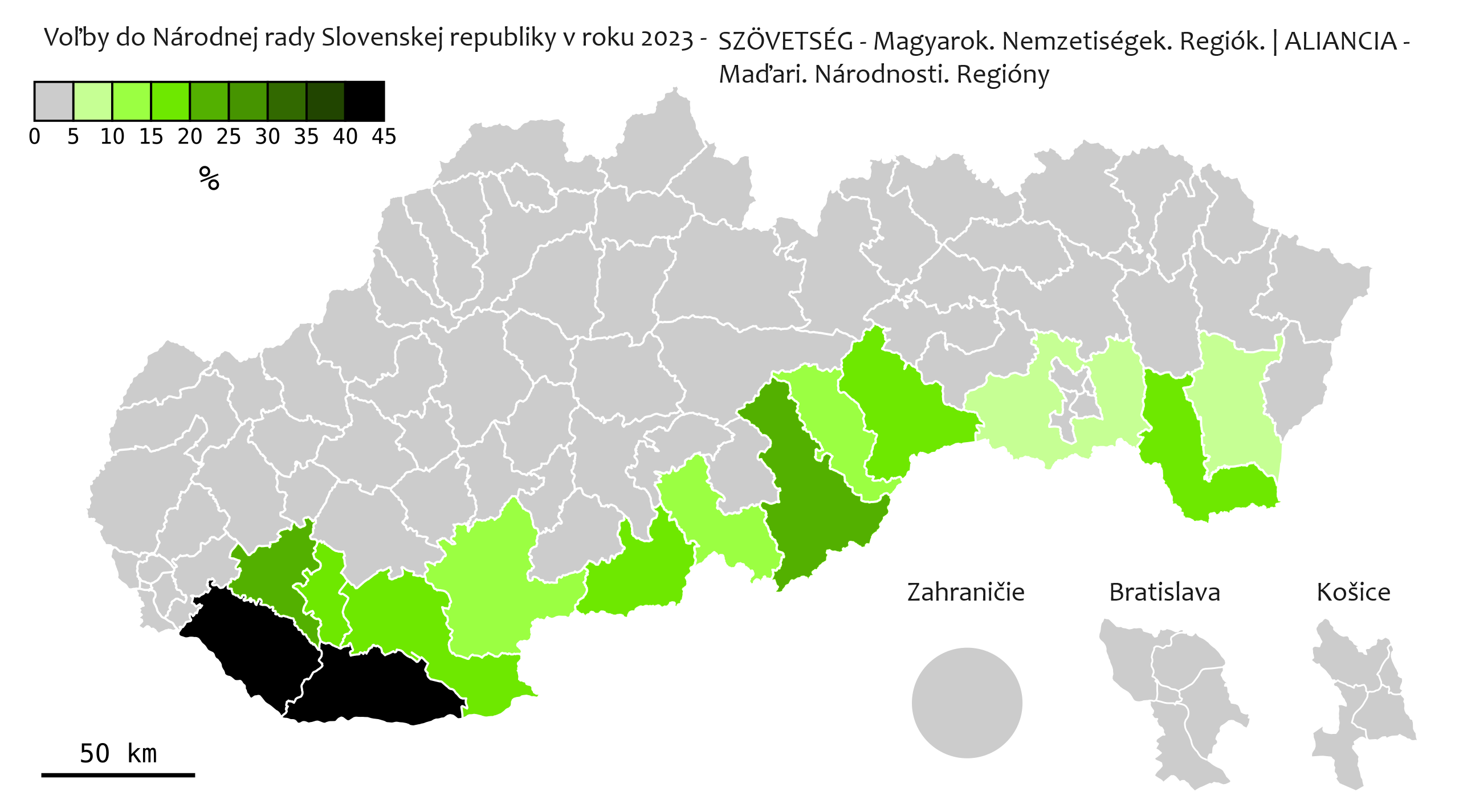
Hungarian Alliance support in the 2023 Slovak parliamentary election

=== National Council ===
Election	Votes	%	Seats	+/–	Government
Hungarian Coalition (MKDM–E–MPP)
1994	292,936	10.19 (#3)	17 / 150	New	Opposition
Party of the Hungarian Coalition
1998	306,623	9.12 (#4)	15 / 150	▼2	SDK–SDĽ–SMK–SOP
2002	321,069	11.16 (#4)	20 / 150	▲5	SDKÚ–SMK–KDH–ANO
2006	269,111	11.68 (#4)	20 / 150	0	Opposition
2010	109,638	4.33 (#7)	0 / 150	▼20	No seats
2012	109,484	4.28 (#8)	0 / 150	0	No seats
Party of the Hungarian Community
2016	105,495	4.05 (#10)	0 / 150	0	No seats
Hungarian Community Togetherness
2020	112,662	3.90 (#9)	0 / 150	0	No seats
Alliance
2023	130,183	4.39 (#9)	0 / 150	0	No seats

=== European Parliament ===
Election	List leader	Votes	%	Rank	Seats	+/–	EP Group
Party of the Hungarian Coalition
2004	Edit Bauer	92,927	13.24%	5th	2 / 14	New	EPP-ED
2009	Edit Bauer	93,750	11.33%	3rd	2 / 13	0	EPP
Party of the Hungarian Community
2014	Pál Csáky	36,629	6.53%	7th	1 / 13	▼1	EPP
2019	József Menyhárt	48,929	4.96%	7th	0 / 13	▼1	–
Hungarian Alliance
2024	József Berényi	57,350	3.88%	8th	0 / 15	0	–

=== President ===
Election	Candidate	1st round			2nd round		
Election	Candidate	Votes	%	Rank	Votes	%	Rank
Party of the Hungarian Coalition
1999	Endorsed; Rudolf Schuster	1,396,950	47.4%	1st	1,727,481	57.2%	1st
2004	Endorsed; Eduard Kukan	438,920	22.1%	3rd	eliminated		
2009	Endorsed; Iveta Radičová	713,735	38.1%	2nd	988,808	44.5%	2nd
Party of the Hungarian Community
2014	Gyula Bárdos	97,035	5.1%	5th	eliminated		
2019	József Menyhárt (Note: Candidate withdrew, but was still on the ballot.)	1,208	0.1%	15th	eliminated		
2019	Endorsed; Robert Mistrík	3,318	0.2%	14th	eliminated		
Hungarian Alliance
2024	Krisztián Forró	65,588	2.91%	4th	eliminated		
