= List of elections in 1972 =

The following elections occurred in the year 1972.

== Africa ==
- 1972 Cameroonian constitutional referendum
- 1972 Gambian general election
- 1972 Guinea-Bissau legislative election
- 1972 Liberian constitutional referendum
- 1972 Malagasy presidential election
- 1972 Moroccan constitutional referendum
- 1972 Swazi parliamentary election

== Asia ==
- 1972 Bahraini Constituent Assembly election
- 1972 Cambodian general election
- 1972 Cambodian presidential election
- 1972 Cambodian constitutional referendum
- 1972 Lebanese general election
- 1972 Laotian parliamentary election
- 1972 North Korean local elections
- 1972 North Korean parliamentary election
- 1972 Republic of China legislative election (Taiwan)
- 1972 Singaporean general election
- 1972 Taiwan presidential election
- 1972 Japanese general election
- 1972 South Korean presidential election
- 1972 South Korean constitutional referendum

== Europe ==
- 1972 Dutch general election
- European Economic Community (EEC) enlargement:
  - Referendum in Denmark (2 October)
  - Referendum in France
  - Referendum in Ireland (10 Mai)
  - Referendum in Norway
- 1972 Finnish parliamentary election
- 1972 West German federal election
- 1972 Gibraltar general election
- 1972 Icelandic presidential election
- 1972 Irish constitutional referendums
- 1972 Italian general election
- 1972 Liechtenstein local elections
- 1972 Polish legislative election
- 1972 Portuguese presidential election
- United Kingdom
  - 1972 United Kingdom local elections
  - 1972 Kingston-upon-Thames by-election
  - 1972 Merthyr Tydfil by-election
  - 1972 Rochdale by-election
  - 1972 Southwark by-election
  - 1972 Sutton and Cheam by-election
  - 1972 Uxbridge by-election

== North America ==
- 1972 Nicaraguan Constitutional Assembly election
- 1972 Panamanian parliamentary election
- 1972 Panamanian presidential election
- 1972 Salvadoran legislative election
- 1972 Salvadoran presidential election

=== Canada ===
- 1972 Canadian federal election
- 1972 Brantford municipal election
- 1972 British Columbia general election
- 1972 British Columbia time referendum
- 1972 Newfoundland general election
- 1972 Ontario municipal elections
- 1972 Ottawa municipal election
- 1972 Toronto municipal election

=== Caribbean ===
- 1972 Anguillian general election
- 1972 Bermudian general election
- 1972 Jamaican general election
- 1972 Puerto Rican general election

=== United States ===
- 1972 United States elections
- 1972 United States presidential election

==== United States lieutenant gubernatorial ====
- 1972 Delaware lieutenant gubernatorial election
- 1972 Louisiana lieutenant gubernatorial election
- 1972 Missouri lieutenant gubernatorial election
- 1972 North Carolina lieutenant gubernatorial election
- 1972 Texas lieutenant gubernatorial election

==== United States gubernatorial ====
- 1972 Arkansas gubernatorial election
- 1972 Delaware gubernatorial election
- 1972 Illinois gubernatorial election
- 1972 Indiana gubernatorial election
- 1972 Iowa gubernatorial election
- 1972 Kansas gubernatorial election
- 1972 Missouri gubernatorial election
- 1972 Montana gubernatorial election
- 1972 New Hampshire gubernatorial election
- 1972 North Carolina gubernatorial election
- 1972 North Dakota gubernatorial election
- 1972 Rhode Island gubernatorial election
- 1972 South Dakota gubernatorial election
- 1972 Texas gubernatorial election
- 1972 United States gubernatorial elections
- 1972 Utah gubernatorial election
- 1972 Vermont gubernatorial election
- 1972 Washington gubernatorial election
- 1972 West Virginia gubernatorial election

==== United States House of Representatives ====
- 1972 United States House of Representatives elections
- 1972 United States House of Representatives election in Alaska
- 1972 United States House of Representatives elections in Arizona
- 1972 United States House of Representatives elections in California
- 1972 United States House of Representatives election in Delaware
- 1972 United States House of Representatives election in the District of Columbia
- 1972 United States House of Representatives election in Nevada
- 1972 United States House of Representatives elections in New Jersey
- 1972 United States House of Representatives elections in New Mexico
- 1972 United States House of Representatives election in North Dakota
- 1972 United States House of Representatives elections in South Carolina
- 1972 United States House of Representatives elections in Texas
- 1972 United States House of Representatives election in Vermont
- 1972 United States House of Representatives election in Wyoming

==== United States Senate ====
- 1972 United States Senate elections
- 1972 United States Senate election in Alabama
- 1972 United States Senate election in Alaska
- 1972 United States Senate election in Arkansas
- 1972 United States Senate election in Colorado
- 1972 United States Senate election in Delaware
- 1972 United States Senate election in Georgia
- 1972 United States Senate special election in Georgia
- 1972 United States Senate election in Idaho
- 1972 United States Senate election in Illinois
- 1972 United States Senate election in Iowa
- 1972 United States Senate election in Kansas
- 1972 United States Senate election in Kentucky
- 1972 United States Senate election in Louisiana
- 1972 United States Senate election in Maine
- 1972 United States Senate election in Massachusetts
- 1972 United States Senate election in Michigan
- 1972 United States Senate election in Minnesota
- 1972 United States Senate election in Mississippi
- 1972 United States Senate election in Montana
- 1972 United States Senate election in Nebraska
- 1972 United States Senate election in New Hampshire
- 1972 United States Senate election in New Jersey
- 1972 United States Senate election in New Mexico
- 1972 United States Senate election in North Carolina
- 1972 United States Senate election in Oklahoma
- 1972 United States Senate election in Oregon
- 1972 United States Senate election in Rhode Island
- 1972 United States Senate election in South Carolina
- 1972 United States Senate election in South Dakota
- 1972 United States Senate election in Tennessee
- 1972 United States Senate election in Texas
- 1972 United States Senate election in Virginia
- 1972 United States Senate election in West Virginia
- 1972 United States Senate election in Wyoming

==== United States mayoral elections ====
- 1972 Auburn, Alabama municipal elections
- 1972 Orlando mayoral election

== Oceania ==
- 1972 Cook Islands general election
- 1972 Fijian general election
- 1972 Fijian local elections
- 1972 New Zealand general election

=== Australia ===
- 1972 Australian federal election
- 1972 Charlestown state by-election
- 1972 Mosman state by-election
- 1972 Queensland state election
- 1972 Tasmanian state election
