= List of elections in 1976 =

The following elections occurred in the year 1976.

== Africa ==
- 1976 Algerian presidential election
- 1976 Algerian constitutional referendum
- 1976 Egyptian parliamentary election
- 1976–1977 Guinea-Bissau legislative election
- 1976 Malawian general election
- 1976 Mauritanian presidential election
- 1976 Tiris El Gharbiya parliamentary by-election (Mauritania)
- 1976 Mauritian general election

== Asia ==
- 1976 Cambodian parliamentary election
- 1976 Cypriot legislative election
- 1976 Egyptian parliamentary election
- 1976 Japanese general election
- 1976 Lebanese presidential election
- 1976 Singaporean general election
- 1976 South Korean legislative election
- 1976 Thai general election
- 1976 Vietnamese legislative election

=== Australia ===
- 1976 Alice Springs by-election
- 1976 New South Wales state election
- 1976 Orange state by-election
- 1976 Tasmanian state election
- 1976 The Hills state by-election
- 1976 Victorian state election

== Europe ==
- 1976 Bulgarian parliamentary election
- 1976 Czechoslovak parliamentary election
- 1976 Gibraltar general election
- 1976 Icelandic presidential election
- 1976 Irish presidential election
- 1976 Italian general election
- 1976 Maltese general election
- 1976 Northern Cypriot general election
- 1976 Polish legislative election
- 1976 Portuguese presidential election
- 1976 Portuguese legislative election
- 1976 Portuguese local election
- 1976 Slovak parliamentary election
- 1976 Stockholm municipal election
- 1976 Swedish general election

=== France ===
- 1976 French cantonal elections

=== Germany ===
- 1976 East German general election
- 1976 West German federal election

== The Americas ==
=== Canada ===
- 1976 Brantford municipal election
- 1976 Ontario municipal elections
- 1976 Ottawa municipal election
- 1976 Progressive Conservative leadership election
- 1976 Quebec general election
- 1976 Toronto municipal election

=== Caribbean ===
- 1976 Anguillian general election
- 1976 Antigua and Barbuda general election
- 1976 Barbadian by-elections
- 1976 Barbadian general election
- 1976 Bermudian general election
- 1976 Cuban parliamentary election
- 1976 Cuban constitutional referendum
- 1976 Grenadian general election
- 1976 Jamaican general election
- 1976 Puerto Rican general election
- 1976 Trinidad and Tobago general election

=== El Salvador ===
- 1976 Salvadoran legislative election

=== United States ===
- 1976 United States elections
- 1976 United States presidential election

==== United States lieutenant gubernatorial ====
- 1976 Delaware lieutenant gubernatorial election
- 1976 Missouri lieutenant gubernatorial election
- 1976 North Carolina lieutenant gubernatorial election

==== United States gubernatorial ====
- 1976 Arkansas gubernatorial election
- 1976 Delaware gubernatorial election
- 1976 Illinois gubernatorial election
- 1976 Indiana gubernatorial election
- 1976 Missouri gubernatorial election
- 1976 Montana gubernatorial election
- 1976 New Hampshire gubernatorial election
- 1976 North Carolina gubernatorial election
- 1976 North Dakota gubernatorial election
- 1976 Rhode Island gubernatorial election
- 1976 United States gubernatorial elections
- 1976 Utah gubernatorial election
- 1976 Vermont gubernatorial election
- 1976 Washington gubernatorial election
- 1976 West Virginia gubernatorial election

==== United States House of Representatives ====
- 1976 United States House of Representatives elections
- 1976 United States House of Representatives election in Alaska
- 1976 United States House of Representatives election in Delaware
- 1976 United States House of Representatives election in Nevada
- 1976 United States House of Representatives election in North Dakota
- 1976 United States House of Representatives election in Vermont
- 1976 United States House of Representatives election in Wyoming

==== United States Senate ====
- 1976 United States Senate elections
- 1976 United States Senate election in Arizona
- 1976 United States Senate election in California
- 1976 United States Senate election in Connecticut
- 1976 United States Senate election in Delaware
- 1976 United States Senate election in Florida
- 1976 United States Senate election in Hawaii
- 1976 United States Senate election in Indiana
- 1976 United States Senate election in Maine
- 1976 United States Senate election in Maryland
- 1976 United States Senate election in Massachusetts
- 1976 United States Senate election in Michigan
- 1976 United States Senate election in Minnesota
- 1976 United States Senate election in Mississippi
- 1976 United States Senate election in Missouri
- 1976 United States Senate election in Montana
- 1976 United States Senate election in Nebraska
- 1976 United States Senate election in Nevada
- 1976 United States Senate election in New Jersey
- 1976 United States Senate election in New Mexico
- 1976 United States Senate election in New York
- 1976 United States Senate election in North Dakota
- 1976 United States Senate election in Ohio
- 1976 United States Senate election in Pennsylvania
- 1976 United States Senate election in Rhode Island
- 1976 United States Senate election in Tennessee
- 1976 United States Senate election in Texas
- 1976 United States Senate election in Utah
- 1976 United States Senate election in Vermont
- 1976 United States Senate election in Virginia
- 1976 United States Senate election in Washington
- 1976 United States Senate election in West Virginia
- 1976 United States Senate election in Wyoming

==== United States mayoral elections ====
- 1976 Auburn, Alabama municipal elections
- 1976 Orlando mayoral election
- 1976 Portland, Oregon mayoral election

== Oceania ==
- 1976 Nauruan parliamentary election
- 1976 Nelson by-election
- 1976 Western Samoan general election

=== Australia ===
- 1976 Alice Springs by-election
- 1976 New South Wales state election
- 1976 Orange state by-election
- 1976 Tasmanian state election
- 1976 The Hills state by-election
- 1976 Victorian state election

== South America ==
=== Falkland Islands ===
- 1976 Falkland Islands general election
