= 1954 Czechoslovak parliamentary election =

| ← 1948 | 28 November 1954 | 1960 → |

All 368 seats in the National Assembly
- Turnout: 99.18%
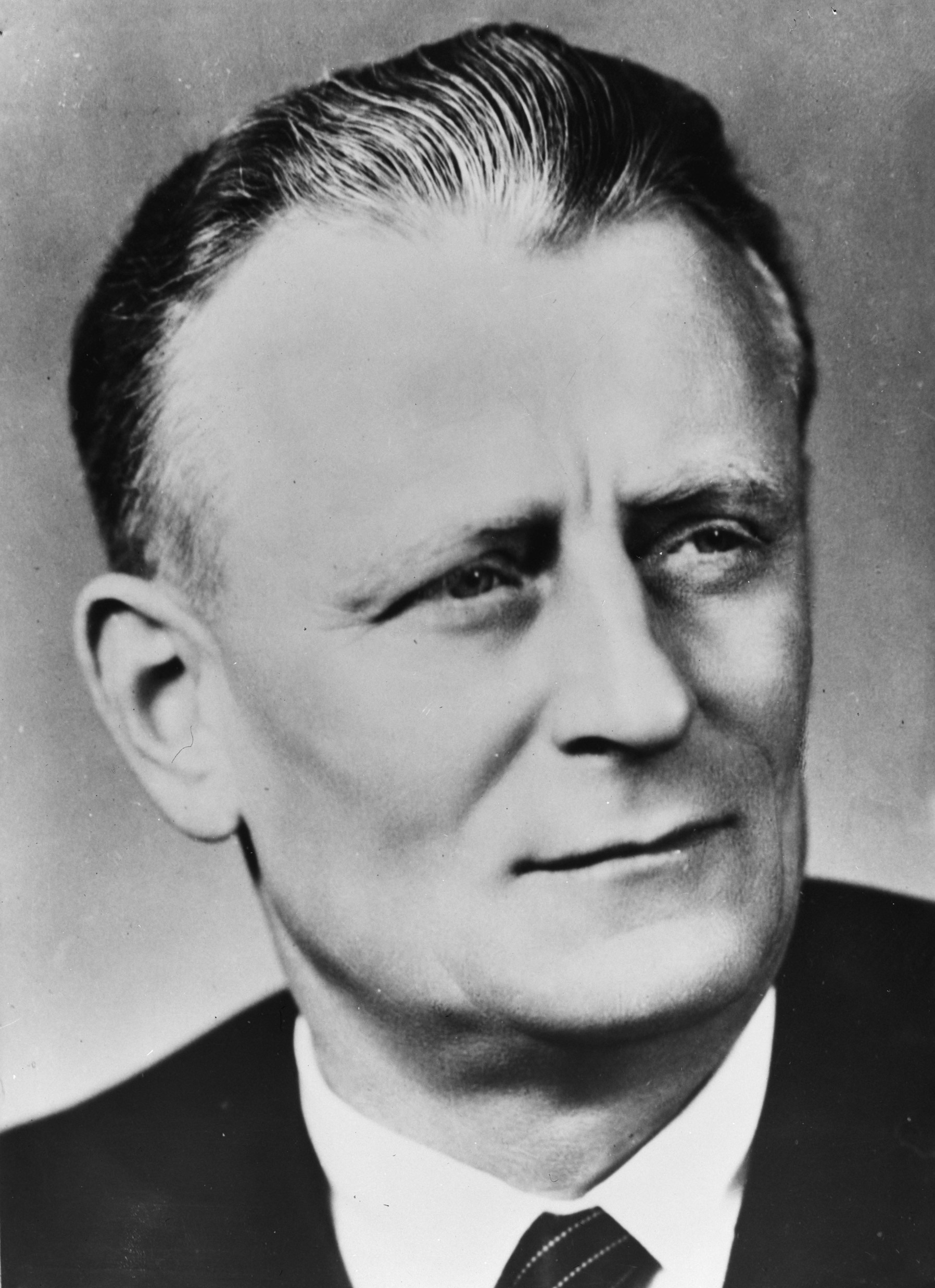
| | Majority party |
|---|---|
| Leader | Antonín Novotný |
| Party | KSČ |
| Alliance | National Front |
| Seats after | 172 |
| Seat change | ▲12 |
Prime Minister before election
Viliam Široký
KSČ
Elected Prime Minister
Viliam Široký
KSČ

Parliamentary elections were held in Czechoslovakia on 28 November 1954. Voters were presented with a single list from the National Front, dominated by the Communist Party of Czechoslovakia (KSČ).

According to official figures, 99% of eligible voters turned out to vote, and 98% approved the National Front list. Within the Front, the Communists had a large majority of 262 seats – 172 for the main party and 90 for the Slovak branch.

Non-Communist members appeared on the National Front list in order to keep up the appearance of pluralism. However, seats were allocated in accordance with a set percentage, and no party could take part in the political process without KSČ approval.

== Results ==
| Party or alliance | | Votes | % | Seats |
|---|---|---|---|---|
| National Front | Communist Party of Czechoslovakia | 8,494,102 | 97.89 | 172 |
| National Front | Communist Party of Slovakia | 8,494,102 | 97.89 | 90 |
| National Front | Czechoslovak People's Party | 8,494,102 | 97.89 | 20 |
| National Front | Czechoslovak Socialist Party | 8,494,102 | 97.89 | 20 |
| National Front | Party of Slovak Revival | 8,494,102 | 97.89 | 6 |
| National Front | Freedom Party | 8,494,102 | 97.89 | 4 |
| National Front | Independents | 8,494,102 | 97.89 | 56 |
| Against | | 182,928 | 2.11 | – |
| Total | | 8,677,030 | 100.00 | 368 |
| Valid votes | | 8,677,030 | 99.60 | |
| Invalid/blank votes | | 34,688 | 0.40 | |
| Total votes | | 8,711,718 | 100.00 | |
| Registered voters/turnout | | 8,783,816 | 99.18 | |
Source: ÚDKSČ, Czechoslovak Unit
