= 1981 Czechoslovak parliamentary election =

← 1976	5–6 June 1981	1986 →

All 200 seats in the House of the People All 150 seats in the House of Nations
- Turnout: 99.51%
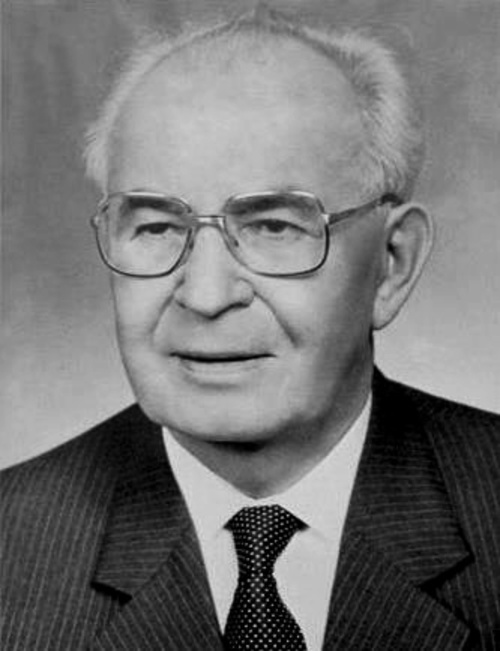
	Majority party
Leader	Gustáv Husák
Party	KSČ
Alliance	National Front
Seats after	242
Seat change	▲5
Prime Minister before election
Lubomír Štrougal
KSČ
Elected Prime Minister
Lubomír Štrougal
KSČ

Parliamentary elections were held in Czechoslovakia on 5 and 6 June 1981. The National Front put forward a single list of candidates for both the House of the People (the lower house) and the House of Nations (the upper house) and one NF candidate ran in each single member constituency. With a total of 350 seats in the two Houses, 240 were assigned to the Communist Party of Czechoslovakia, 18 to the Czechoslovak People's Party, 18 to the Czechoslovak Socialist Party, four to the Party of Slovak Revival, four to the Freedom Party and 66 to independents. Voter turnout was reported to be 99.51%.

Like the other elections of the Communist era, the result was a foregone conclusion. People were afraid not to vote, and when they did so, those who entered a voting booth to modify their ballot paper could expect to be persecuted by the state.

== Results ==
=== House of the People ===
Party or alliance		Votes	%	Seats
National Front	Communist Party of Czechoslovakia (Note: One member of the Communist parliamentary group is also in the unaffiliated group. This member has been placed in the Communist results in this table.)	10,725,609	99.96	137
National Front	Czechoslovak People's Party	10,725,609	99.96	12
National Front	Czechoslovak Socialist Party	10,725,609	99.96	11
National Front	Party of Slovak Revival	10,725,609	99.96	2
National Front	Freedom Party	10,725,609	99.96	2
National Front	Independents	10,725,609	99.96	36
Against		4,596	0.04	–
Total		10,730,205	100.00	200
Valid votes		10,730,205	99.94	
Invalid/blank votes		6,107	0.06	
Total votes		10,736,312	100.00	
Registered voters/turnout		10,789,574	99.51	
Source: , IPU, CZSO

=== House of Nations ===
Party or alliance		Votes	%	Seats
National Front	Communist Party of Czechoslovakia (Note: Two members of the Communist parliamentary group is also in the unaffiliated group. These members has been placed in the Communist results in this table.)	10,725,895	99.96	105
National Front	Czechoslovak Socialist Party	10,725,895	99.96	7
National Front	Czechoslovak People's Party	10,725,895	99.96	6
National Front	Party of Slovak Revival	10,725,895	99.96	2
National Front	Freedom Party	10,725,895	99.96	2
National Front	Independents	10,725,895	99.96	28
Against		4,308	0.04	–
Total		10,730,203	100.00	150
Valid votes		10,730,203	99.94	
Invalid/blank votes		6,109	0.06	
Total votes		10,736,312	100.00	
Registered voters/turnout		10,789,574	99.51	
Source: , IPU, CZSO
