= 1964 Slovak parliamentary election =

- 14 June 1964

All 92 seats in the Slovak National Council 47 seats needed for a majority
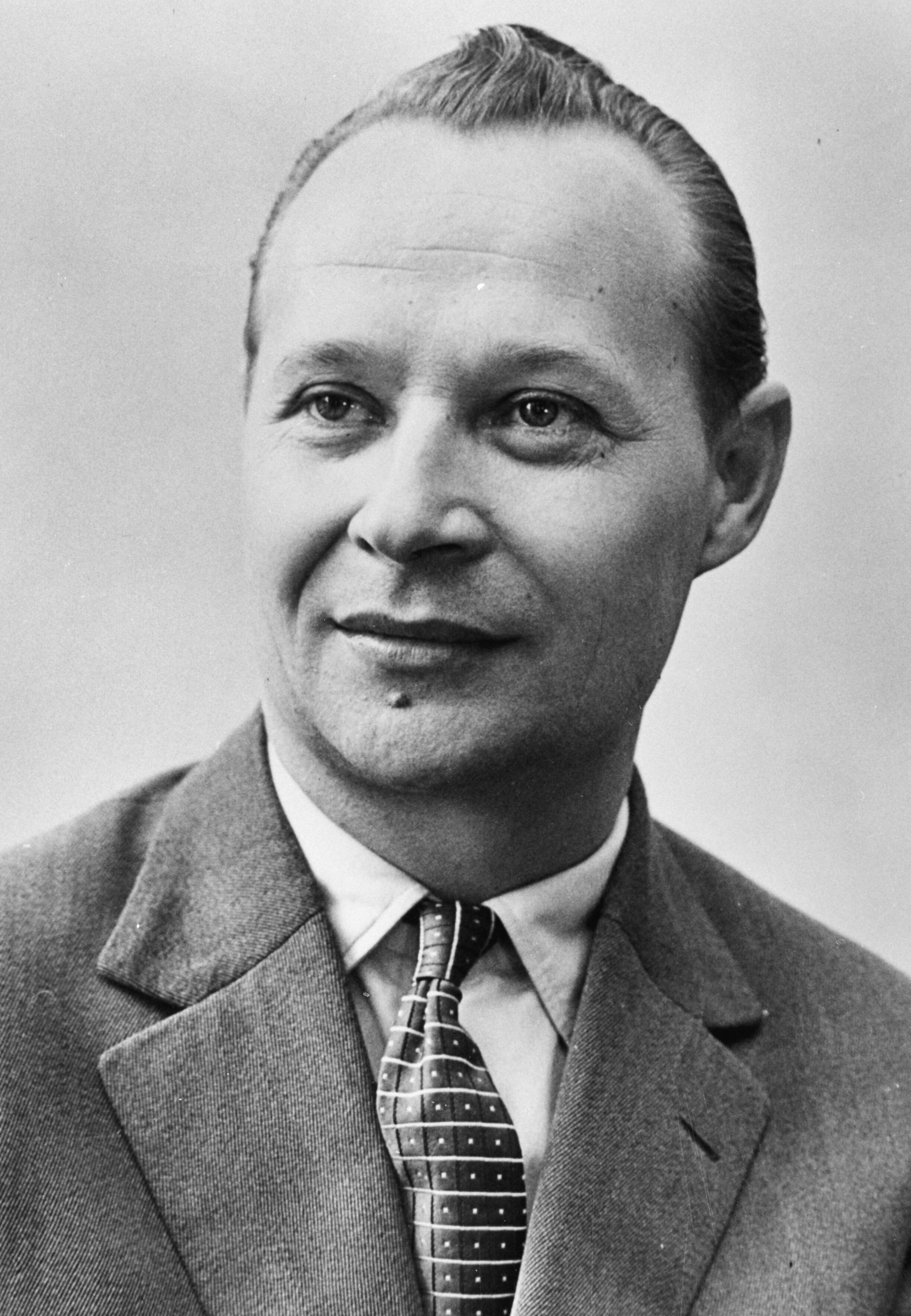
	First party
Leader	Alexander Dubček
Party	KSS
Alliance	National Front
Last election	87 seats
Seats won	92
Seat change	▲5
Chairman before election
Michal Chudík
KSS
Elected Chairman
Michal Chudík
KSS

Parliamentary elections were held in Slovakia on 14 June 1964, alongside national elections. All 92 seats in the National Council were won by the National Front.

== Results ==
Party or alliance		Votes	%	Seats
National Front	Communist Party of Slovakia	2,645,843	99.94	58
National Front	Party of Slovak Revival	2,645,843	99.94	5
National Front	Freedom Party	2,645,843	99.94	4
National Front	Independents and others	2,645,843	99.94	25
Against		1,605	0.06	–
Total		2,647,448	100.00	92
Valid votes		2,647,448	99.86	
Invalid/blank votes		3,595	0.14	
Total votes		2,651,043	100.00	
Registered voters/turnout		2,666,534	99.42	
Source: PSP
