= 1992 Orlando mayoral election =

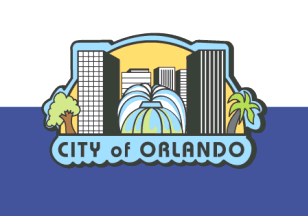
- September 1, 1992
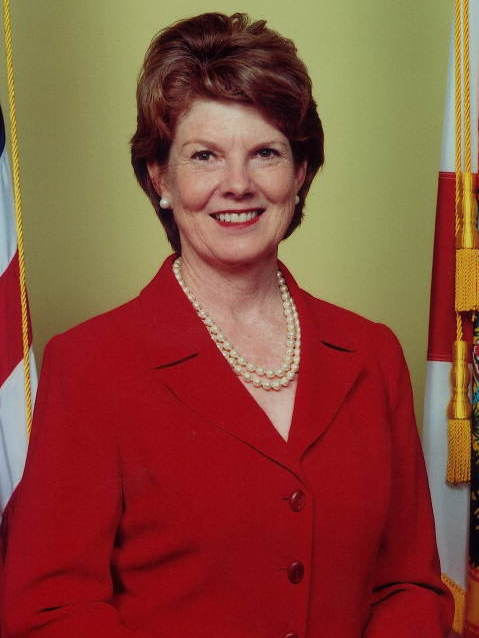

Candidate	Glenda Hood	Dale C. Smith	Jim Newslow
Party	Nonpartisan	Nonpartisan	Nonpartisan
Popular vote	15,509	2,620	2,546
Percentage	75.01%	12.67%	12.31%
Mayor before election
Bill Frederick
Nonpartisan
Elected mayor
Glenda Hood
Nonpartisan

The 1992 Orlando mayoral election took place on September 1, 1992. Incumbent Mayor Bill Frederick declined to seek re-election to a fourth term. City Councilmember Glenda Hood ran to succeed Frederick and emerged as the frontrunner, with endorsements from both Frederick and Orange County Chairman Linda Chapin. She faced two little-known opponents: Dale Smith, a former city planner who ran for mayor three times before, and optometrist Jim Newslow. Hood defeated both in a landslide, winning her first term with 75 percent of the vote and becoming the first female Mayor of Orlando.

== General election ==
=== Candidates ===
- Glenda Hood, City Councilmember
- Dale C. Smith, former city planner, auto shop owner, 1980, 1984, and 1988 candidate for Mayor
- Jim Newslow, optometrist

==== Declined ====
- Bill Frederick, incumbent Mayor

=== Results ===
1992 mayoral election results
Party	Candidate	Votes	%
Nonpartisan	Glenda Hood	15,509	75.01%
Nonpartisan	Dale C. Smith	2,620	12.67%
Nonpartisan	Jim Newslow	2,546	12.31%
Total votes		20,675	100.00%
