= 1971 Czechoslovak parliamentary election =

- 26–27 November 1971

All 200 seats in the House of the People All 150 seats in the House of Nations
	Majority party
Leader	Gustáv Husák
Party	KSČ
Alliance	National Front
Seats after	245
Seat change	▲100
Prime Minister before election
Lubomír Štrougal
KSČ
Elected Prime Minister
Lubomír Štrougal
KSČ

Parliamentary elections were held in Czechoslovakia on 26 and 27 November 1971. They were the first held after the Constitutional Act on the Czechoslovak Federation converted Czechoslovakia into a federal republic, comprising the Czech Socialist Republic and the Slovak Socialist Republic, as well as the first elections in Czechoslovakia held in the aftermath of the Prague Spring.

The National Front, dominated by the Communist Party of Czechoslovakia, put forward a single list of candidates for both houses of the Federal Assembly, the House of the People (the lower house) and the House of Nations (the upper house). A single NF-approved candidate ran in each single member constituency. With a total of 350 seats in the two Houses, 245 were assigned to the Communist Party, 20 to the Czechoslovak Socialist Party, 16 to the Czechoslovak People's Party, four to the Party of Slovak Revival, four to the Freedom Party, and 61 to independents. Voter turnout was reported to be 99.45%.

Like the other elections of the Communist era, the result was a foregone conclusion. People were afraid not to vote, and when they did so, those who entered a voting booth to modify their ballot paper could expect to be persecuted by the state.

== Results ==
=== House of the People ===
Party or alliance		Votes	%	Seats
National Front	Communist Party of Czechoslovakia	10,153,572	100.00	145
National Front	Czechoslovak Socialist Party	10,153,572	100.00	13
National Front	Czechoslovak People's Party	10,153,572	100.00	8
National Front	Party of Slovak Revival	10,153,572	100.00	2
National Front	Freedom Party	10,153,572	100.00	2
National Front	Independents	10,153,572	100.00	30
Total		10,153,572	100.00	200
Registered voters/turnout		10,253,796	–	
Source: , IPU, CZSO

=== House of Nations ===
Party or alliance		Votes	%	Seats
National Front	Communist Party of Czechoslovakia	10,144,464	100.00	100
National Front	Czechoslovak People's Party	10,144,464	100.00	8
National Front	Czechoslovak Socialist Party	10,144,464	100.00	7
National Front	Party of Slovak Revival	10,144,464	100.00	2
National Front	Freedom Party	10,144,464	100.00	2
National Front	Independents	10,144,464	100.00	31
Total		10,144,464	100.00	150
Registered voters/turnout		10,253,796	–	
Source: IPU, CZSO, (Note: Seat counts have been extrapolated by subtracting the IPU seat counts for the entire Federal Assembly with the House of the People's seat counts)
