= 1976 Orlando mayoral election =

- September 12, 1976

| Candidate | Carl T. Langford | Shelton Adams |
| Party | Nonpartisan | Nonpartisan |
| Popular vote | 10,365 | 9,909 |
| Percentage | 51.12% | 48.88% |
Mayor before election
Carl T. Langford
Nonpartisan
Elected mayor
Carl T. Langford
Nonpartisan

The 1976 Orlando mayoral election took place on September 7, 1976. Incumbent Mayor Carl T. Langford ran for re-election to a third full term. Though City Commissioner George Stuart Jr. considered running for mayor, he ultimately opted against it, leaving advertising executive Shelton Adams as Langford's only opponent.

Langford was the frontrunner in the race, and was endorsed for re-election by the Sentinel Star, which praised his "broad administrative experience" and for developing a "long range program" that helped the city economically develop.

Adams ran an aggressive campaign, attracting endorsements from the local police and firefighter unions.

Langford won re-election by a narrow margin, receiving 51 percent of the vote to Adams's 49 percent. Langford led on election night, but the race was too close to call until the absentee ballots could be counted, at which point Adams conceded and pledged to run again in 1980.

== General election ==
=== Candidates ===
- Carl T. Langford, incumbent Mayor
- Shelton Adams, advertising executive

==== Declined ====
- George Stuart Jr., City Commissioner

=== Results ===
1976 Orlando mayoral election results
| Party | Candidate | Votes | % |
|---|---|---|---|
| Nonpartisan | Carl T. Langford (inc.) | 10,365 | 51.12% |
| Nonpartisan | Shelton Adams | 9,909 | 48.88% |
| Total votes | | 20,274 | 100.00% |
