= 1967 Orlando mayoral special election =

← 1964	February 21, 1967 (primary election); March 7, 1967 (general election)	1968 →
Candidate	Carl T. Langford	Wally Sanderlin	Claude R. Edwards
First round	7,208; 47.33%	5,000; 32.83%	2,635; 17.30%
Runoff	10,147; 57.19%	7,596; 42.81%	Eliminated
Mayor before election
George Barker (Pro Tem)
Nonpartisan
Elected mayor
Carl T. Langford
Nonpartisan

The 1967 Orlando mayoral special election was held on March 7, 1967, following a primary election on February 21, 1967, to elect the mayor of Orlando, Florida. Mayor Bob Carr, who was re-elected to his third term in 1964 died on January 29, 1967. Following Carr's death, City Commissioner George Barker served as Mayor Pro Tem until the vacancy was filled at a special election, and Barker declined to contest the election.

Four candidates ran in the special election: businessman Carl T. Langford, who narrowly lost the 1964 election to Carr; City Commissioner Wally Sanderlin; former City Commissioner Claude Edwards; and protest candidate Jim Coughlin. In the primary election, Langford placed first by a wide margin, winning 47 percent of the vote to Sanderlin's 33 percent. Langford ultimately defeated Sandlin by a wide margin in the general election, winning 57 percent of the vote.

== Primary election ==
=== Candidates ===
- Carl T. Langford, businessman, 1964 candidate for Mayor
- Wally Sanderlin, City Commissioner, 1964 candidate for Mayor
- Claude R. Edwards, former City Commissioner
- Jim Coughlin, protest candidate

==== Declined ====
- George Barker, Mayor Pro Tem
- J. Charlie Gray, attorney, former Chairman of the Florida State Turnpike Authority

=== Results ===
Primary election results
Party	Candidate	Votes	%
Nonpartisan	Carl T. Langford	7,208	47.33%
Nonpartisan	Wally Sanderlin	5,000	32.83%
Nonpartisan	Claude R. Edwards	2,635	17.30%
Nonpartisan	Jim Coughlin	385	2.53%
Total votes		15,228	100.00%

== General election ==
=== Results ===
1967 Orlando mayoral special election results
Party	Candidate	Votes	%
Nonpartisan	Carl T. Langford	10,147	57.19%
Nonpartisan	Wally Sanderlin	7,596	42.81%
Total votes		17,743	100.00%
