= 1964 Orlando mayoral election =

- May 5, 1964 (primary election); May 26, 1964 (general election)
Candidate	Bob Carr	Carl T. Langford	Wally Sanderlin
First round	6,580; 31.66%	8,125; 39.09%	5,845; 28.12%
Runoff	10,071; 50.53%	9,860; 49.47%
Mayor before election
Bob Carr
Nonpartisan
Elected mayor
Bob Carr
Nonpartisan

The 1964 Orlando mayoral election was on May 26, 1964, following a primary election on May 5, 1964, to elect the mayor of Orlando, Florida. Incumbent Mayor Bob Carr ran for re-election to a third term. Carr was challenged for re-election by City Commissioner Wally Sanderlin, contractor Carl T. Langford, and businessman Ed Wilson. In the primary election, Langford placed first, winning 39 percent of the vote to Carr's 32 percent, Sanderlin's 28 percent, and Wilson's 1 percent. Langford and Carr advanced to a runoff election, which Carr narrowly won, receiving 51 percent of the vote to Langford's 49 percent.

However, Carr did not end up serving out his full term. On January 29, 1967, Carr died, triggering a special election that Langford ended up winning.

== Primary election ==
=== Candidates ===
- Carl T. Langford, contractor
- Bob Carr, incumbent Mayor
- Wally Sanderlin, City Commissioner
- Ed Wilson, businessman

=== Results ===
Primary election results
Party	Candidate	Votes	%
Nonpartisan	Carl T. Langford	8,125	39.09%
Nonpartisan	Bob Carr (inc.)	6,580	31.66%
Nonpartisan	Wally Sanderlin	5,845	28.12%
Nonpartisan	Ed Wilson	234	1.13%
Total votes		20,784	100.00%

== General election ==
=== Results ===
1964 Orlando mayoral election results
Party	Candidate	Votes	%
Nonpartisan	Bob Carr (inc.)	10,071	50.53%
Nonpartisan	Carl T. Langford	9,860	49.47%
Total votes		19,931	100.00%
