= Ján Ševčík =

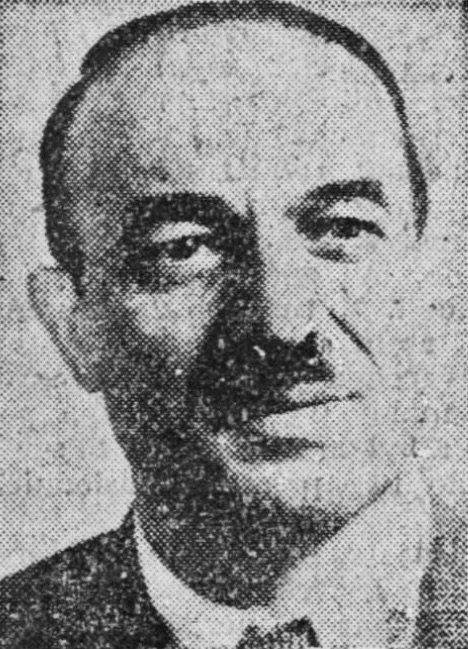
Ján Ševčík

Ján Ševčík (Brezolupy, 13 February 1896 - Bratislava, 6 March 1965) was a Czechoslovak politician.

Ševčík participated in the Czechoslovak Legion during World War I. After the war he studied law and from 1926 to 1934 represented the Slovak People's Party (incl. as secretary of the faction). After that, he worked in the agrarian sector.

From 1939 to 1942 he was the head of the YMCA administration in Bratislava.

Ševčík was an opponent of fascism and therefore joined the Slovak résistance movement. The Slovak résistance opposed the nominally independent Slovak republic that was established in 1939 by monseigneur Jozef Tiso but to a large extent controlled by Germans. In 1944 the Slovak National Uprising took place, in which Ševčík participated. The résistance forces met an early success in fighting with Slovak fascists and German troops, but later had to retreat.

After World War II Ševčík joined the Democratic Party (DS). The DS won the 1946 election in the Slovak part of Czechoslovakia and thereafter had to share power with the Communist Party of Slovakia (KSS). Ševčík became a deputy once more. The communists carried out a 'great purge' of DS members in 1946–1948. After the communist coup d'état in February 1948, the DS was banned and replaced by the Party of Slovak Revival (SSO), a pro-communist satellite party. Ševčík became the chairman of the SSO. He served as State Secretary in the Ministry of Defense in Klement Gottwald's second cabinet and later vice-premier in Antonín Zápotocký's cabinet.

In 1952 Ševčík was arrested and accused of opposition to the socialist development of Czechoslovakia. He was sentenced to 17 years imprisonment, but was released in 1960.

On 6 March 1965 Ševčík died. He was rehabilitated soon after.
