= 1964 Czechoslovak parliamentary election =

- 14 June 1964

All 300 seats in the National Assembly
- Turnout: 99.42%
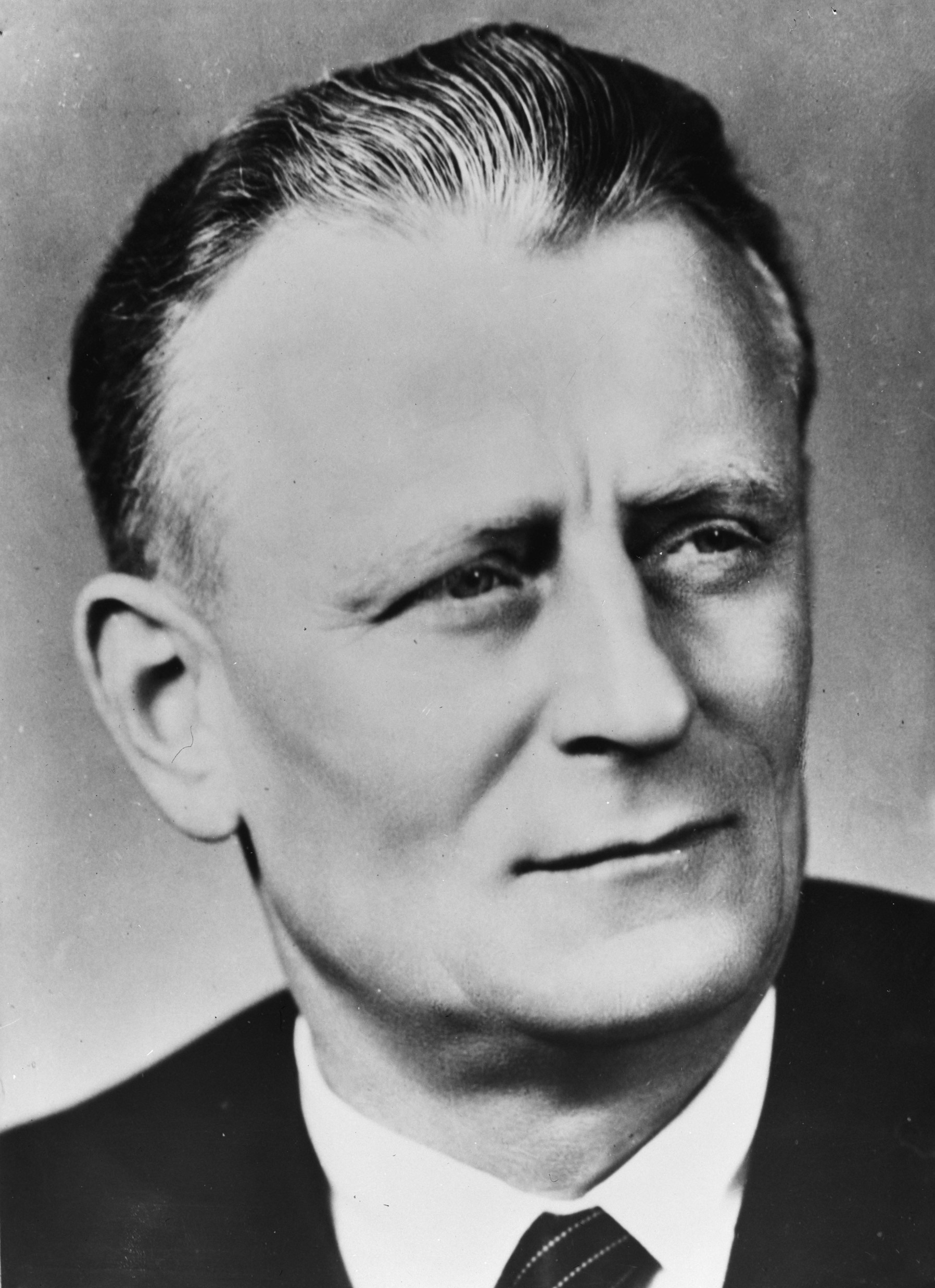
	Majority party
Leader	Antonín Novotný
Party	KSČ
Alliance	National Front
Seats after	145
Seat change	▼2
Prime Minister before election
Jozef Lenárt
KSČ
Elected Prime Minister
Jozef Lenárt
KSČ

Parliamentary elections were held in Czechoslovakia on 14 June 1964, the first since the adoption of a new constitution in July 1960.

Voters were presented with a single list of candidates from the National Front, dominated by the Communist Party of Czechoslovakia (KSČ). According to official figures, 99.4% of eligible voters turned out to vote, and 99.9% of those who voted approved the National Front list. Within the Front, the Communists had a large majority of 217 seats–145 for the main party and 72 for the Slovak branch.

Non-Communist members appeared on the National Front list in order to keep up the appearance of pluralism. However, seats were allocated in accordance with a set percentage, and no party could take part in the political process without KSČ approval.

== Results ==
Party or alliance		Votes	%	Seats
National Front	Communist Party of Czechoslovakia	9,412,309	99.94	145
National Front	Communist Party of Slovakia	9,412,309	99.94	72
National Front	Czechoslovak Socialist Party	9,412,309	99.94	24
National Front	Czechoslovak People's Party	9,412,309	99.94	20
National Front	Party of Slovak Revival	9,412,309	99.94	6
National Front	Freedom Party	9,412,309	99.94	5
National Front	Independents	9,412,309	99.94	28
Against		6,040	0.06	–
Total		9,418,349	100.00	300
Valid votes		9,418,349	99.85	
Invalid/blank votes		13,798	0.15	
Total votes		9,432,147	100.00	
Registered voters/turnout		9,487,296	99.42	
Source: PSP, CZSO
