= 1972 Anguillian general election =

General elections were held in Anguilla on 24 July 1972. The People's Progressive Party won six of the seven seats and its leader Ronald Webster became chair of the council. Webster was later appointed as the first Chief Minister shortly before the 1976 elections.

== Background ==
In 1971 the British government had taken over direct rule of Anguilla due to disputes over the island remaining part of the Saint Christopher-Nevis-Anguilla federation. The Anguilla Council was created, with seven members elected from single-member constituencies and up to six nominated members.

== Results ==
Only one member was nominated to the council, Idalia Gumbs.

Party	Votes	%	Seats
People's Progressive Party			6
Independents			1
Appointed members			1
Total			8
Total votes	1,457	–	
Registered voters/turnout	3,105	46.92	
Source: Caribbean Elections
