= 1948 Czechoslovak parliamentary election =

- 30 May 1948

All 300 seats in the National Assembly
- Turnout: 92.76%
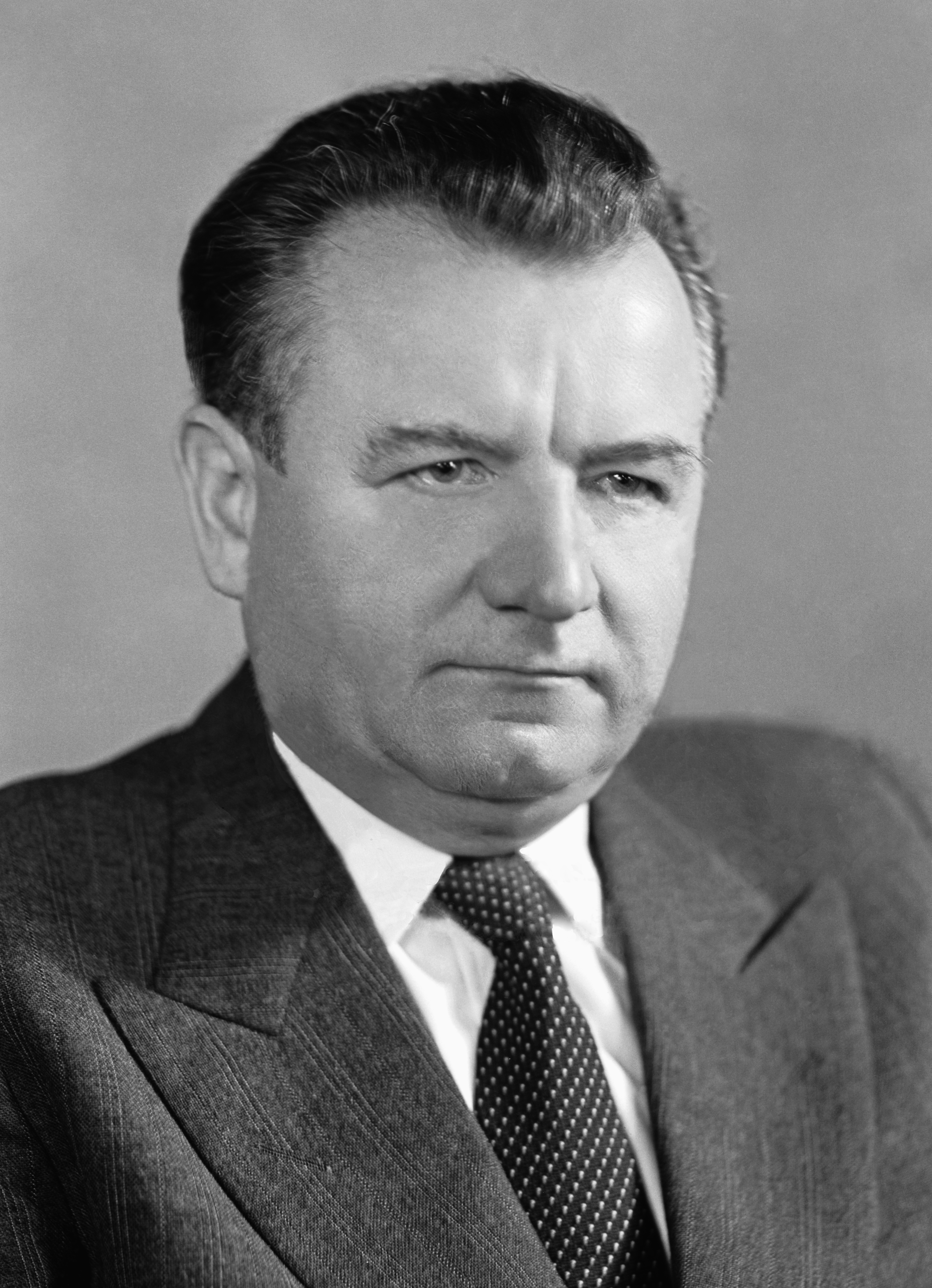
	Majority party
Leader	Klement Gottwald
Party	KSČ
Alliance	National Front
Seats after	160
Seat change	▲67
Prime Minister before election
Klement Gottwald
KSČ
Elected Prime Minister
Klement Gottwald
KSČ

Parliamentary elections were held in Czechoslovakia on 30 May 1948. They were the first elections held under Communist rule; the Communist Party of Czechoslovakia (KSČ) had seized complete power four months earlier.

The endgame began on 13 February, when a majority of the cabinet demanded that Communist Interior Minister Václav Nosek stop packing the police with Communists. Nosek refused, and was supported by Prime Minister and Communist Party leader Klement Gottwald. On 21 February, 12 non-Communist ministers (out of a total of 27 ministers) resigned, believing that President Edvard Beneš would side with them and force Gottwald to either back down, resign, or call early elections that the Communists would not have time to rig. Beneš initially supported their position, and refused to accept their resignations. By this time, however, Gottwald had dropped all pretense of liberal democracy. He not only refused to resign, but demanded the appointment of a Communist-dominated government under threat of a general strike. His Communist colleagues occupied the offices of the non-Communist ministers.

Fearing Red Army intervention, Beneš gave way on 25 February and appointed a new government in accordance with Gottwald's demands. Communists and pro-Moscow Social Democrats held most of the key posts. Members of the other parties still figured, so it was still technically a coalition. However, all non-Communist ministers except Foreign Minister Jan Masaryk were fellow travellers handpicked by the Communists. On 9 May, a new constitution was approved by the now-subservient Constituent National Assembly. Although it declared Czechoslovakia a people's democratic state and branded the coup as a defense of "the People's Democratic Order," it was not a completely Communist document. However, the influence of the 1936 Soviet Constitution was strong enough that Beneš refused to sign it.

The reconfigured government scheduled elections that set the tone for all elections held in Czechoslovakia until 1989. Voters were presented with a single list from the National Front, a postwar coalition that had been converted into a Communist-dominated patriotic organisation. Voters could only reject the list by requesting a blank ballot. The Front officially received 89.2 percent of the vote, with the Communists and their Slovak branch winning 214 of the 300 seats (160 for the main party and 54 for the Slovak branch), enough for a majority in their own right. Their majority grew even larger when the Social Democrats merged with the Communists later in the year.

The non-socialist members of the Front were allowed to maintain their existence in order to keep up the appearance of pluralism. However, since no party could take part in the political process without KSČ approval, Communist control was now total. Representation was allocated in accordance with a set percentage. For the next four decades, voters would only have the option of approving or rejecting a single list from the National Front.

Beneš resigned three days after the elections, and Gottwald took over most presidential duties until his formal election as president 12 days later.

The 89.2 percent received by the Front would be the lowest vote share that it would claim during the 41 years of Communist rule in Czechoslovakia. In subsequent elections, the Front would claim to win with 97 percent or more of the vote.

== Results ==
Party or alliance		Votes	%	Seats
National Front	Communist Party of Czechoslovakia	6,424,734	89.25	160
National Front	Communist Party of Slovakia	6,424,734	89.25	54
National Front	Czechoslovak Social Democracy	6,424,734	89.25	23
National Front	Czechoslovak People's Party	6,424,734	89.25	23
National Front	Czechoslovak Socialist Party	6,424,734	89.25	23
National Front	Party of Slovak Revival	6,424,734	89.25	12
National Front	Freedom Party	6,424,734	89.25	5
Blank votes		774,032	10.75	–
Total		7,198,766	100.00	300
Valid votes		7,198,766	97.03	
Invalid votes		220,487	2.97	
Total votes		7,419,253	100.00	
Registered voters/turnout		7,998,035	92.76	
Source: Czechoslovak Unit
