= 1960 Czechoslovak parliamentary election =

- 12 June 1960

All 300 seats in the National Assembly
- Turnout: 99.68%
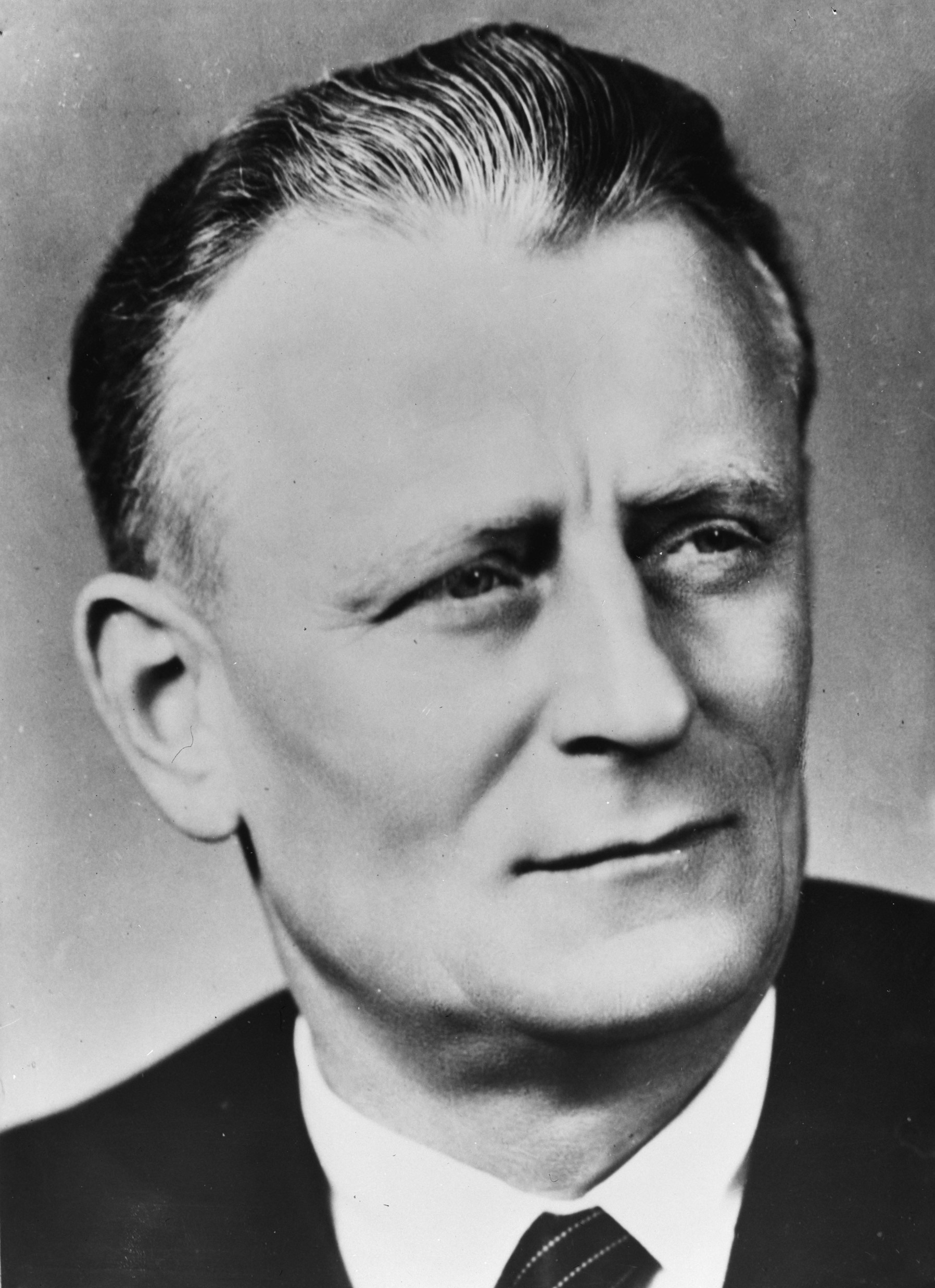
	Majority party
Leader	Antonín Novotný
Party	KSČ
Alliance	National Front
Seats after	147
Seat change	▼25
Prime Minister before election
Viliam Široký
KSČ
Elected Prime Minister
Viliam Široký
KSČ

Parliamentary elections were held in Czechoslovakia on 12 June 1960. Voters were presented with a single list from the National Front, dominated by the Communist Party of Czechoslovakia (KSČ). According to official figures, 99.7 percent of eligible voters turned out to vote, and 99.9 percent of those who voted approved the National Front list. Within the Front, the Communists had a large majority of 216 seats–147 for the main party and 69 for the Slovak branch.

Non-Communist members appeared on the National Front list in order to keep up the appearance of pluralism. However, seats were allocated in accordance with a set percentage and no party could take part in the political process without KSČ approval.

These were the last elections held under the Ninth-of-May Constitution. A month after the elections, the new National Assembly approved a new constitution that proclaimed "socialism has won" in Czechoslovakia, and changed the country's official name to the Czechoslovak Socialist Republic. The new document made democratic centralism a part of constitutional law and defined Czechoslovakia as a socialist state under the leadership of the KSČ, codifying the actual state of affairs that had prevailed since the 1948 Communist takeover.

== Results ==
Party or alliance		Votes	%	Seats
National Front	Communist Party of Czechoslovakia	9,059,838	99.86	147
National Front	Communist Party of Slovakia	9,059,838	99.86	69
National Front	Czechoslovak Socialist Party	9,059,838	99.86	19
National Front	Czechoslovak People's Party	9,059,838	99.86	16
National Front	Party of Slovak Revival	9,059,838	99.86	4
National Front	Freedom Party	9,059,838	99.86	2
National Front	Independents	9,059,838	99.86	43
Against		12,775	0.14	–
Total		9,072,613	100.00	300
Valid votes		9,072,613	99.86	
Invalid/blank votes		12,819	0.14	
Total votes		9,085,432	100.00	
Registered voters/turnout		9,115,013	99.68	
Source: PSP, CZSO
