= 1986 Czechoslovak parliamentary election =

- 23–24 May 1986

All 200 seats in the House of the People All 150 seats in the House of Nations
- Turnout: 99.40%
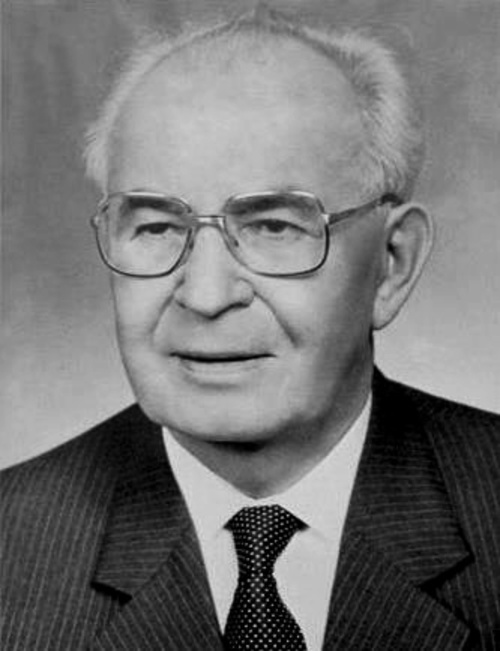
| | Majority party |
|---|---|
| Leader | Gustáv Husák |
| Party | KSČ |
| Alliance | National Front |
| Seats after | 241 |
| Seat change | ▼1 |
Prime Minister before election
Lubomír Štrougal
KSČ
Elected Prime Minister
Lubomír Štrougal
KSČ

Parliamentary elections were held in Czechoslovakia on 23 and 24 May 1986. The National Front put forward a single list of candidates for both the House of the People (the lower house) and the House of Nations (the upper house) and one NF candidate ran in each single member constituency. With a total of 350 seats in the two Houses, 242 were assigned to the Communist Party of Czechoslovakia, 18 to the Czechoslovak People's Party, 18 to the Czechoslovak Socialist Party, four to the Party of Slovak Revival, four to the Freedom Party and 64 to independents. Voter turnout was reported to be 99.39%.

Like the other elections of the Communist era, the result was a foregone conclusion. People were afraid not to vote, and when they did so, those who entered a voting booth to modify their ballot paper could expect to be persecuted by the state.

== Results ==
=== House of the People ===
| Party or alliance | | Votes | % | Seats |
|---|---|---|---|---|
| National Front | Communist Party of Czechoslovakia | 10,871,881 | 99.4 | 138 |
| National Front | Czechoslovak People's Party | 10,871,881 | 99.4 | 11 |
| National Front | Czechoslovak Socialist Party | 10,871,881 | 99.4 | 11 |
| National Front | Party of Slovak Revival | 10,871,881 | 99.4 | 2 |
| National Front | Freedom Party | 10,871,881 | 99.4 | 2 |
| National Front | Independents | 10,871,881 | 99.4 | 36 |
| Against | | | 0.6 | – |
| Total | | | | 200 |
| Total votes | | 10,884,947 | – | |
| Registered voters/turnout | | 10,950,675 | 99.40 | |
Source: , IPU, CZSO

=== House of Nations ===
| Party or alliance | | Votes | % | Seats |
|---|---|---|---|---|
| National Front | Communist Party of Czechoslovakia | | | 103 |
| National Front | Czechoslovak People's Party | | | 7 |
| National Front | Czechoslovak Socialist Party | | | 7 |
| National Front | Party of Slovak Revival | | | 2 |
| National Front | Freedom Party | | | 2 |
| National Front | Independents | | | 29 |
| Total | | | | 150 |
| Total votes | | 10,884,947 | – | |
| Registered voters/turnout | | 10,950,675 | 99.40 | |
Source: , IPU, CZSO

== 1989–1990 co-options ==
Following the Velvet Revolution of November 1989 that overthrew the Communist regime in Czechoslovakia, the Federal Assembly passed a new law empowering itself to fill vacant seats through co-option. This was used to elect members of newly formed democratic parties and organizations in place of resigning hardline Communists and other supporters of the old regime, ahead of the free elections scheduled for June 1990. The process took place in three waves, on 28 December 1989, 30 January 1990 and then 27 February 1990. The process mirrored the removal of reform Communists from the Assembly in favor of hardline ones in 1969 after the crushing of the Prague Spring. Its main architect Zdeněk Jičínský, a former dissident and Prague Spring figure whom had himself been a victim of such co-option, likely intended it as retribution.

| Party | Seats | |
| Party | House of the People | House of Nations |
|---|---|---|
| Communist Party of Czechoslovakia | 77 | 64 |
| Civic Forum | 40 | 22 |
| Public Against Violence | 20 | 16 |
| Czechoslovak People's Party | 11 | 7 |
| Czechoslovak Socialist Party | 11 | 7 |
| Christian Democratic Movement | 2 | 1 |
| Christian Democratic Party | 2 | 0 |
| Czech Social Democratic Party | 2 | 1 |
| Green Party | 2 | 1 |
| Democratic Party | 2 | 2 |
| Czechoslovak Democratic Initiative | 2 | 0 |
| Freedom Party | 2 | 3 |
| Coexistence | 0 | 1 |
| Independents | 27 | 26 |
| Total | 200 | 151 |
