= Federal Election Campaign Act Amendments of 1974 =

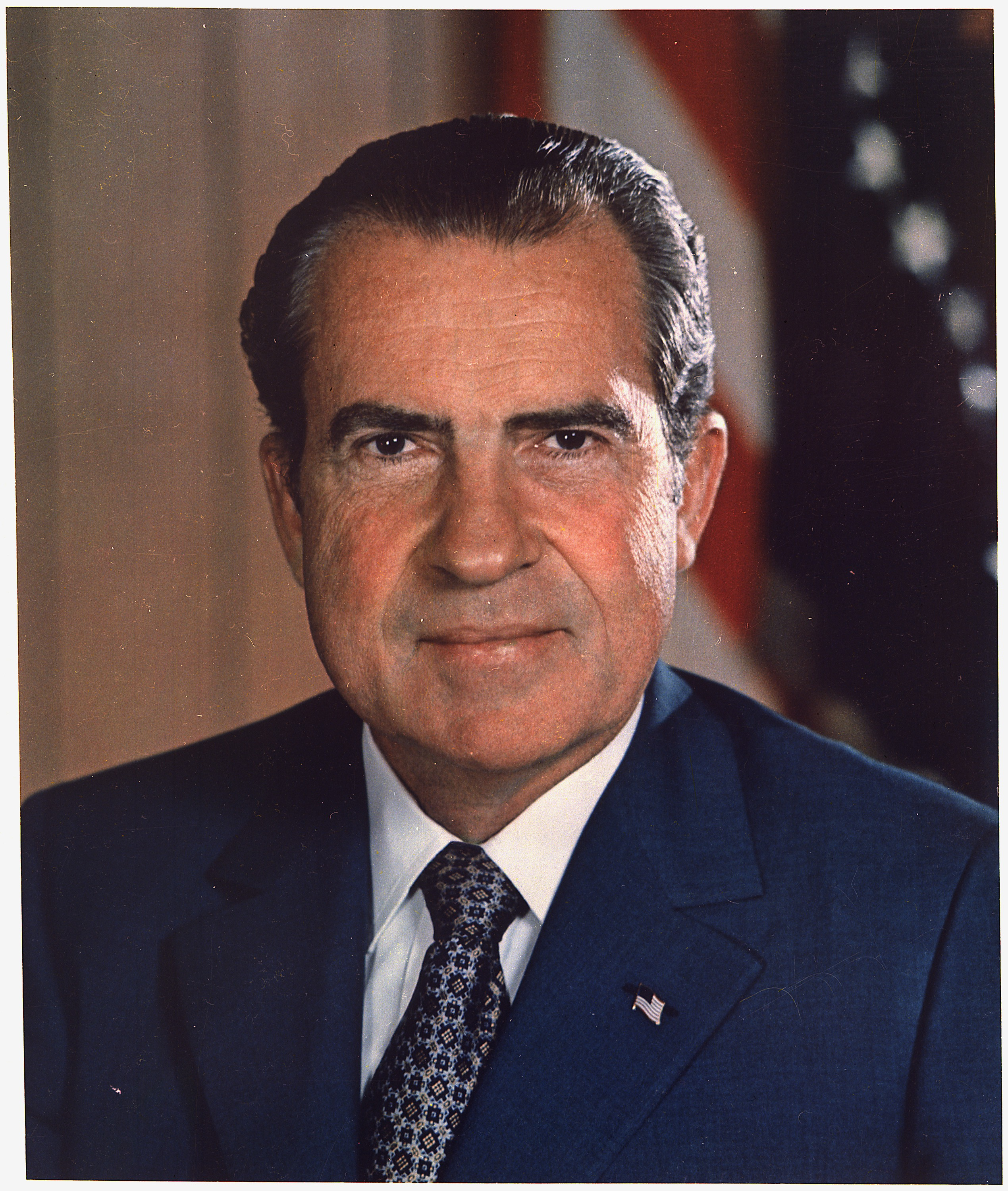
President Richard Nixon

The Federal Election Campaign Act (FECA) Amendments of 1974 were designed to reduce corruption in elections, especially after the Watergate scandal showed how much money could influence politics. The law set limits on how much could be donated to people running for office and created the Federal Election Commission as an enforcement body. After debates and changes made to the bill, President Gerald Ford signed the FECA 1974 Amendments into law.

== Background ==
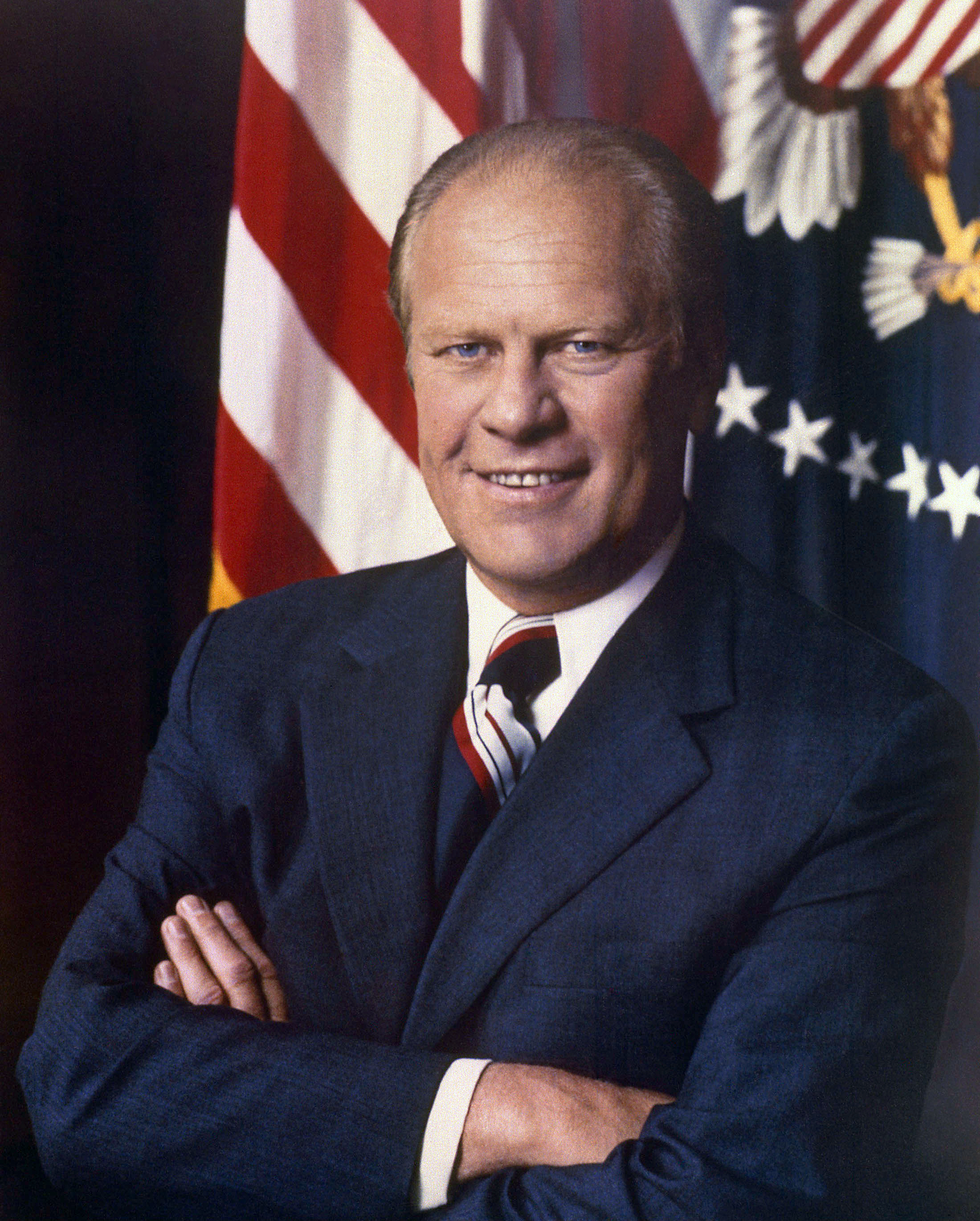
President Gerald Ford

The FECA amendments of 1974 were passed in response to growing concern over corruption and the role of money in elections, especially after the Watergate scandal. In addition, widespread public criticism put direct pressure on Congress to do something about it. The original Federal Election Campaign Act of 1971 did not have an enforcement body to regulate campaign finance which paved the way for the 1974 Amendments.

== Legislative history ==
The Federal Election Campaign Act Amendments of 1974 began as a reaction to campaign abuse scandals. The legislation grew out of national concern over campaign money abuses that became widespread after the 1972 elections.

Some Democrats and Republicans wanted broader reform such as limits on contributions and total campaign spending. On the other hand, some Republicans and Democrats opposed public financing, saying that it would use taxpayer money and did not address the corruption in campaign finance.

The 1974 amendments to the Federal Election Campaign Act were introduced in the U.S. House of Representatives on February 26, 1973, as bill H.R. 4708. The amendments were then introduced in the Senate on March 6, 1973, as S. 1094.

The 1974 FECA amendments passed in the Senate on April 11, 1974.

The 1974 FECA amendments passed in the House of Representatives on August 8, 1974.

The 1974 FECA amendments were signed into law by President Gerald Ford on October 15, 1974.

== Provisions ==
Contribution and expenditure limitations

Section 101 established limits on contributions to federal candidates by individuals and political committees. Individuals could contribute up to $1,000 per candidate, per election, and no more than $25,000 in total contributions during a calendar year. Political action committees (PACs) could contribute up to $5,000 per candidate, per election. The section also set expenditure limits for candidates. $70,000 per House election, and for Senate candidates, the greater of $100,000 or eight cents per voting-age resident for primaries and $150,000 or twelve cents per voter for general elections. Presidential candidates were limited to $50,000 in personal or family funds, with lower limits for Senate ($35,000) and House ($25,000) campaigns.

Federal Election Commission (FEC)

Section 310 established the Federal Election Commission (FEC) and detailed its operating procedures. The FEC was given authority to administer and enforce federal campaign finance laws, including conducting audits and investigations, issuing regulations, and imposing civil penalties for violations.

Campaign committees and reporting

Section 202 requires federal candidates to designate a campaign committee responsible for financial reporting and coordinating with other authorized committees. The section also clarified reporting obligations and ensured unified disclosure of receipts and expenditures.

Political activity and public funding

Section 401 clarifies restrictions on political activities by state and local officials, outlining expectations for candidacy and nonpartisan election participation.

Section 403 regulates the Presidential Election Campaign Fund of up to $10 million per candidate for primary campaigns and up to $20 million for general election campaigns.

Section 407 grants the FEC enforcement authority to disqualify candidates or impose fines of up to $25,000 for violations such as failure to report financial activity or exceeding legal spending limits.
