= Politics of Communist Czechoslovakia =

Although political control of Communist Czechoslovakia was largely monopolized by the authoritarian Communist Party of Czechoslovakia (KSČ), the party technically shared political power with other parties of the National Front. The leader (General Secretary or First Secretary) of the KSČ was de facto the most powerful person in the country during this period. Czechoslovakia's foreign policy was openly influenced by the foreign policy of the Soviet Union.

== National Front ==
Other parties and organizations existed formally but functioned in subordinate roles to KSČ, because the KSČ was grouped together with the KSS, four other political parties, and all of Czechoslovakia's mass organizations under the political umbrella of the National Front of the Czechoslovak Socialist Republic.

== Influence of the Soviet Union ==
Czechoslovakia continued to demonstrate subservience to the policies of the Communist Party of the Soviet Union (CPSU) in domestic and especially in foreign affairs.

Czechoslovakia's political alignment with the Soviet Union began during World War II. In 1945, it was the Soviet Red Army that liberated Prague from the Nazis. The continued presence of the Red Army in Czechoslovakia until 1946 facilitated the communists' efforts to reorganize local government, the militia, and the Czechoslovak army and to place communists in key positions. Following the February 1948 coup d'état in which the communists seized power, Soviet influence over Czechoslovakia grew markedly. It was abetted through formal alliances, such as the Council for Mutual Economic Assistance (Comecon) and the Warsaw Pact, and through direct intervention, in the 1968 invasion. In the immediate post-World War II period, many Czechoslovak citizens supported the alliance with the Soviet Union. They did not anticipate, however, the rigidities of the Stalinist rule that followed. The extent of the repression during the early years of the rule by the Communist Party of Czechoslovakia (Komunistická strana Československa — the KSČ) was unprecedented. In the early 1950s, some 900,000 persons were purged from the ranks of the KSČ; just about 100,000 were jailed for such political crimes as "bourgeois nationalism." Antonín Novotný became First Secretary of the KSČ in 1953, the year of Stalin's death, and continued to rule in Stalin's rigidly authoritarian style for fifteen years. In practice (though not in rhetoric), Novotný ignored Nikita Khrushchev's 1956 denunciation of Stalin and made no attempt to imitate the Soviet Union's decentralization of communist party rule. A considerable portion of the party hierarchy did take note of the Soviet decentralization, however. In 1968, they removed Novotný from power and initiated the Prague Spring.

The Warsaw Pact invasion of Czechoslovakia in 1968 was a pivotal event in Czechoslovakia's political development. The August intervention by forces from the Soviet Union, the German Democratic Republic (East Germany), Poland, Bulgaria, and Hungary marked the beginning of the end of the Prague Spring and the reformist policies introduced by the Alexander Dubček regime. It also set the stage for the reemergence in Czechoslovakia of a pro-Soviet regime and a politically orthodox environment under the leadership of Gustáv Husák and Miloš Jakeš, which lasted until 1989, even during perestroika in the Soviet Union.

== Ethnic considerations ==
This was another essential ingredient in Czechoslovak political culture. The Slovaks, having their own state during World War II, were never as satisfied as the Czechs with the nation created in 1918 because they felt dominated by the numerically superior Czech nationals. The communist takeover in 1948 did not lead to equitable treatment of Czechs and Slovaks.

The Stalinist purges of the early 1950s were particularly harsh on Slovaks; indeed, the definition of "bourgeois nationalism" coincided quite precisely with the aspirations of Slovak nationalism. Among the Slovak leaders arrested and jailed in the early 1950s was Gustáv Husák. Husák later was rehabilitated and eventually named General Secretary (the title changed from First Secretary in 1971) of the KSČ and President of the republic.

Slovak aspirations for greater autonomy played an important role in the political environment during the 1960s. The reform movement associated with the Prague Spring advocated greater independence for Slovakia. The 1968 constitutional amendments redefined Czechoslovakia as a federation of two equal states and nations, the Czech nation and the Slovak nation, and increased the responsibilities of the constituent republics. However, this decentralization of power did not survive the 1968 invasion and subsequent normalization policies. On paper, the federation remained and the Slovak Socialist Republic retained its separate communist party organization (see: Communist Party of Slovakia) and republic-level government organs. In practice, whatever power the 1968 amendments gave to the Slovaks was diminished when the Husák regime reestablished centralized party and government control in the 1970s (although Husák was a Slovak himself). But in sum, the federalization of Czechoslovakia remained an important step in Czechoslovak politics.

== See also ==
- Eastern Bloc politics

== Bibliography ==
Archives Unbound. "Czechoslovakia From Liberation to Communist State: 1945-1963 Records of the U.S. State Department Classified Files" (PDF). GDC Gale: Archives Unbound. Archived from the original (PDF) on 1 December 2020.

Gawdiak, Ihor (1989). Czechoslovakia: a country study (PDF) (3rd ed.). Federal Research Division & Library of Congress. ISSN 1057-5294.

Grogin, Robert C. (2001). Natural Enemies: The United States and the Soviet Union in the Cold War, 1917-1991. Lexington Books. ISBN 9780739101605.

Lukes, Igor (2012). On the Edge of the Cold War: American Diplomats and Spies in Postwar Prague (illustrated ed.). OUP USA. ISBN 9780195166798.

Pynsent, Robert B. (2007). "Conclusory Essay: Activists, Jews, The Little Czech Man, and Germans" (PDF). Central Europe. 5 (2): 211–333. doi:10.1179/174582107x190906.

RFE/RL Czechoslovak Unit, Blinken Open Society Archives, Budapest

Suda, Zdeněk (1980). Zealots and Rebels: A History of the Communist Party of Czechoslovakia. Hoover Institution Press. ISBN 9780817973421.

This article incorporates text from this source, which is in the public domain. Country Studies. Federal Research Division.
