= We Have Had Enough! =

We Have Had Enough! Máme toho dosť!
- Leader: František Oravec
- Vice Presidents: Patrik Magdoško; Raymond Kopka; Róbert Pikáli
- Founder: František Oravec
- Founded: 30 October 2019
- Dissolved: 2022
- Headquarters: Gyňov 193, Gyňov
- Ideology: Agrarianism; Regionalism; Environmentalism; Anti-corruption
- Colours: red, green

Website
- stranamametohodost.sk (Archive)

We Have Had Enough! (Slovak: Máme toho dosť!) was an agrarian political party in Slovakia. It was formed following protests by farmers in 2018 and 2019 surrounding the allocation of farm subsidies from the European Union. It contested the 2020 parliamentary elections and received over 9,000 votes before dissolving by 2022.

== History ==
Under the European Union's Common Agricultural Policy, farmers in the EU are given subsidies in order to supplant their income and allow farmers "to make a reasonable living". According to the law in Slovakia, anyone who farms on the land can claim subsidies, even if they do not own the land itself. These laws meant that fraud could be committed quite easily. Journalist Ján Kuciak was going to publish an article alleging that several million Euros in subsidies had been lost due to fraud, but he was murdered on 26 February 2018.

Following Kuciak's murder, several large-scale anti-government protests were held. Slovakian farmers played an important role, demanding more transparent rules for the distribution of EU subsidies. The protests continued into 2019, and in August of that year František Oravec announced the founding of a new party, named after a slogan used by the protesting farmers.

The party contested the 2020 parliamentary election, running a total of 71 candidates, with party leader František Oravec receiving the most (4,082) votes. The party received a total of 9,260, 0.32% of the national vote and the fifteenth largest vote share overall, and did not win any seats in the National Council.

== Ideology ==
Having been founded by farmers, the party focused mainly on agricultural issues. It called for self-sufficiency of food products, reforming the way EU farming grants are awarded, and restrictions on the export of timber in order to protect Slovakia's forests. In addition, it would encourage the establishment of regional farming companies and put in place more financial assistance for new farmers. Outside of agriculture, the party pledged to introduce new employment programs, reduce taxation of businesses, and improve Slovakia's less developed regions. The party also pledged to tailor its campaigns to specific regions of Slovakia, in order to "bring the strong voice of the regions to the National Council".
