= 1976 Czechoslovak parliamentary election =

- 22–23 October 1976

All 200 seats in the House of the People All 150 seats in the House of Nations
- Turnout: 99.70%
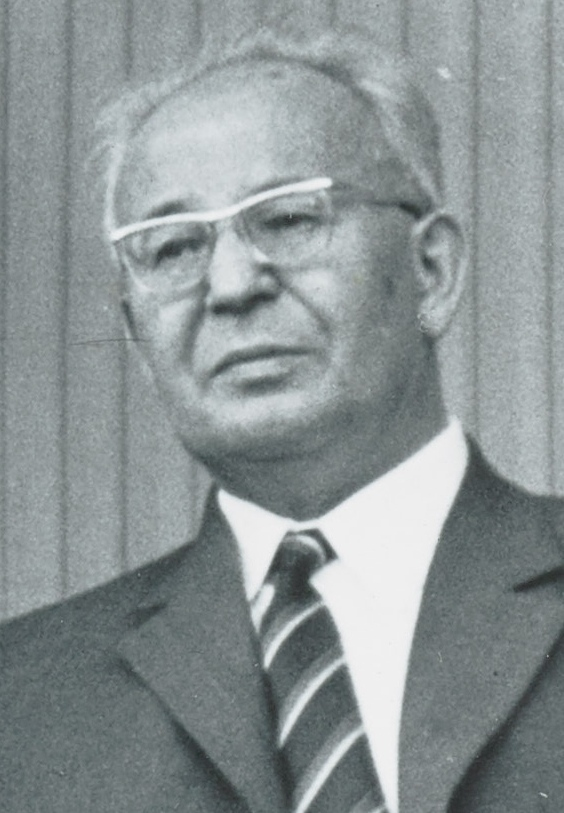
| | Majority party |
|---|---|
| Leader | Gustáv Husák |
| Party | KSČ |
| Alliance | National Front |
| Seats after | 237 |
| Seat change | ▼8 |
Prime Minister before election
Lubomír Štrougal
KSČ
Elected Prime Minister
Lubomír Štrougal
KSČ

Parliamentary elections were held in Czechoslovakia on 22 and 23 October 1976. The National Front put forward a single list of candidates for both the House of the People (the lower house) and the House of Nations (the upper house), with one NF candidate contesting each single member constituency. With a total of 350 seats in the two Houses, 237 were assigned to the Communist Party of Czechoslovakia, 18 to the Czechoslovak People's Party, 17 to the Czechoslovak Socialist Party, 4 to the Party of Slovak Revival and 74 to other parties. The reported voter turnout was 99.7%.

As with previous elections during the Communist era, the outcome was a foregone conclusion. People were afraid not to vote, and when they did so, those who entered a voting booth to modify their ballot paper could expect to be persecuted by the state.

== Results ==
=== House of the People ===
| Party or alliance | | Votes | % | Seats |
|---|---|---|---|---|
| National Front | Communist Party of Czechoslovakia (Note: One member of the Communist parliamentary group is also in the unaffiliated group. This member has been placed in the Communist results in this table.) | 10,605,672 | 99.97 | 137 |
| National Front | Czechoslovak People's Party | 10,605,672 | 99.97 | 11 |
| National Front | Czechoslovak Socialist Party | 10,605,672 | 99.97 | 10 |
| National Front | Party of Slovak Revival | 10,605,672 | 99.97 | 2 |
| National Front | Freedom Party | 10,605,672 | 99.97 | 2 |
| National Front | Independents | 10,605,672 | 99.97 | 38 |
| Against | | 3,583 | 0.03 | – |
| Total | | 10,609,255 | 100.00 | 200 |
| Valid votes | | 10,609,255 | 99.93 | |
| Invalid/blank votes | | 7,897 | 0.07 | |
| Total votes | | 10,617,152 | 100.00 | |
| Registered voters/turnout | | 10,649,261 | 99.70 | |
Source: , IPU, CZSO

=== House of Nations ===
| Party or alliance | | Votes | % | Seats |
|---|---|---|---|---|
| National Front | Communist Party of Czechoslovakia | 10,605,672 | 99.97 | 102 |
| National Front | Czechoslovak People's Party | 10,605,672 | 99.97 | 7 |
| National Front | Czechoslovak Socialist Party | 10,605,672 | 99.97 | 7 |
| National Front | Party of Slovak Revival | 10,605,672 | 99.97 | 2 |
| National Front | Freedom Party | 10,605,672 | 99.97 | 2 |
| National Front | Independents | 10,605,672 | 99.97 | 30 |
| Against | | 3,372 | 0.03 | – |
| Total | | 10,609,044 | 100.00 | 150 |
| Valid votes | | 10,609,044 | 99.92 | |
| Invalid/blank votes | | 8,108 | 0.08 | |
| Total votes | | 10,617,152 | 100.00 | |
| Registered voters/turnout | | 10,649,261 | 99.70 | |
Source: , IPU, CZSO
