= 1988 Orlando mayoral election =

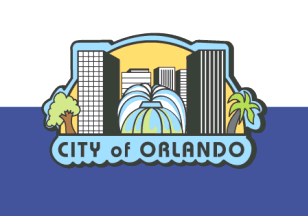
- September 6, 1988
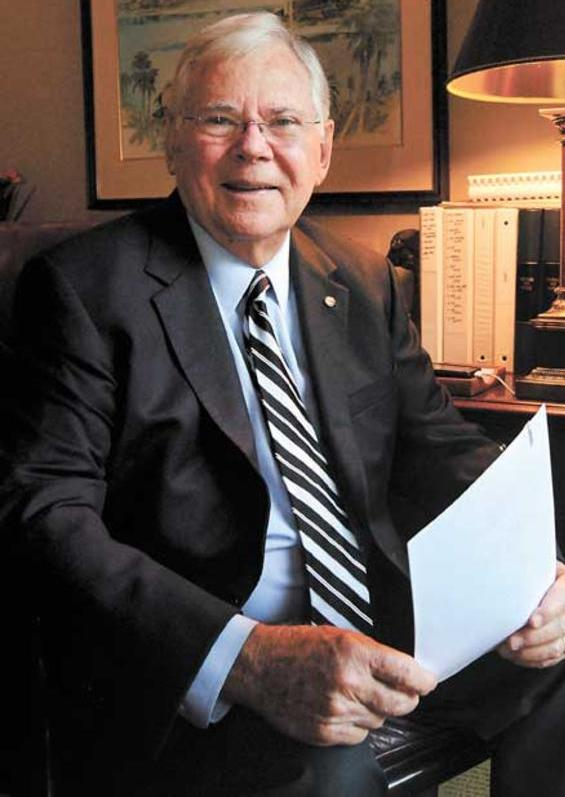

Candidate	Bill Frederick	Tim Adams	Dale C. Smith
Party	Nonpartisan	Nonpartisan	Nonpartisan
Popular vote	13,973	2,227	1,947
Percentage	77.00%	12.27%	10.73%
Mayor before election
Bill Frederick
Nonpartisan
Elected mayor
Bill Frederick
Nonpartisan

The 1988 Orlando mayoral election took place on September 6, 1988. Incumbent Mayor Bill Frederick ran for re-election to a third term. He faced the same opponents as he did in his 1984 re-election campaign: insurance salesman Tim Adams and former city planner Dale Smith.

Frederick campaigned on his plans to revitalize the city's downtown, build a new basketball arena and city hall, hire more police officers, and address growing traffic concerns, while his opponents argued that his administration focused on the needs of wealthier citizens and ignored some neighborhoods. The Orlando Sentinel endorsed him for re-election, as it did in his previous two races, noting that he "has made it easy for voters to support him" because of his work to "turn[] Orlando into a city that reaches for excellence in everything from its commerce to its arts."

Frederick ultimately won re-election in a landslide, receiving 77 percent of the vote to Adams's 12 percent and Smith's 11 percent.

== General election ==
=== Candidates ===
- Bill Frederick, incumbent Mayor
- Tim Adams, insurance salesman, securities broker, 1984 candidate for Mayor
- Dale C. Smith, former city planner, 1984 candidate for Mayor

=== Results ===
1988 Orlando mayoral election results
Party	Candidate	Votes	%
Nonpartisan	Bill Frederick (inc.)	13,973	77.00%
Nonpartisan	Tim Adams	2,227	12.27%
Nonpartisan	Dale C. Smith	1,947	10.73%
Total votes		18,147	100.00%
