= 1972 Orlando mayoral election =

- September 12, 1972

Candidate	Carl T. Langford	Jack Mitchell
Party	Nonpartisan	Nonpartisan
Popular vote	12,138	3,491
Percentage	77.66%	22.34%
Mayor before election
Carl T. Langford
Nonpartisan
Elected mayor
Carl T. Langford
Nonpartisan

The 1972 Orlando mayoral election took place on September 12, 1972. Incumbent Mayor Carl T. Langford ran for re-election to a second full term, which he said would be his last. He was challenged for re-election by Reverend Jack Mitchell, the Florida director of the Congress for Racial Equality (CORE).

Mitchell's campaign was supported by CORE, which focused its local electoral efforts on his campaign. He attacked Langford for failing to deliver on promises to remove parking meters and to build a civic center, and suggested the creation of an Orlando city school district to solve local concerns over busing.

Despite Mitchell's spirited campaign, Langford remained the frontrunner, raising significantly more funds than Mitchell, and ultimately defeated him in a landslide, winning re-election with 78 percent of the vote.

== General election ==
=== Candidates ===
- Carl T. Langford, incumbent mayor
- Jack Mitchell, Congress of Racial Equality state director, pastor

=== Results ===
1972 Orlando mayoral election results
Party	Candidate	Votes	%
Nonpartisan	Carl T. Langford (inc.)	12,138	77.66%
Nonpartisan	Jack Mitchell	3,491	22.34%
Total votes		15,629	100.00%
