= 1972 Liberian constitutional referendum =

A constitutional referendum was held in Liberia on 4 April 1972. The changes to the constitution would lower the voting age from 21 to 18, and had been announced by President William Tolbert shortly after taking office. On 15 February the date of the referendum was set to coincide with a by-election for the vice presidency. The change required a two-thirds majority in favour, and was approved by voters.
