= 1972 Fijian local elections =

Local elections were held in Fiji on 5 November 1972, with voters electing members of the councils of Lautoka and Suva. They were the first local elections after the common electoral roll was introduced.

== Results ==
=== Suva ===
In Suva, the Alliance Party won fourteen seats on the City Council and the National Federation Party six, with the Alliance Party's Peter Allan elected mayor.

=== Lautoka ===
In Lautoka, the National Federation Party won eight seats and the Alliance Party four, with the NFP's Hari Punja elected mayor.
