= 1972 Panamanian parliamentary election =

Parliamentary elections were held in Panama on 6 August 1972, electing a National Constituent Assembly.

== Background ==
Following the 1968 coup, elections were not held under the military government until April 1970, when the town of San Miguelito, incorporated as the country's sixty-fourth municipal district, was allowed to elect a mayor, treasurer, and municipal council. Candidates nominated by trade groups and other nonpartisan bodies were elected indirectly by a council that had been elected by neighborhood councils, which allowed for a more representative selection process in the absence of direct elections during the military government.

The old National Assembly associated with the influence of the traditional parties was abolished and a 505-member National Constituent Assembly was to be elected. The elections were carried out using the small subdistricts into which Panama had been divided during colonial times as constituencies.

The traditional political parties were banned from electoral participation, and short legislative sessions ensured that there would be no time to mount meaningful challenges to military executive authority. While Liberals and Panameñistas boycotted the elections, the People's Party had 120 candidates, though all candidates officially ran as independents.

== Results ==
Party	Votes	%	Seats
Independents	513,023	100.00	505
Total	513,023	100.00	505
Valid votes	513,023	96.55	
Invalid votes	8,600	1.62	
Blank votes	9,739	1.83	
Total votes	531,362	100.00	
Registered voters/turnout	629,630	84.39	
Source: Nohlen

== Aftermath ==
Meeting in September, the Assembly acclaimed General Omar Torrijos as "the Supreme Leader of the Panamanian Revolution". It also approved a new constitution, which greatly expanded governmental powers at the expense of civil liberties. The state also was empowered to "oversee the rational distribution of land" and, in general, to regulate or initiate economic activities, which included implementing policies aimed at land reform and economic development to benefit the population. In a reference to the Canal Zone, the Constitution also declared the ceding of national territory to any foreign country to be illegal. The constitution also recognized the central role within the executive branch of General Torrijos and the defense forces. The impotency of the president within this new constitutional structure was best expressed by the fact that he could neither appoint nor remove military personnel.

After the constitution was promulgated, the Assembly was renamed the National Assembly of Community Representatives.
