= 1976 United States House of Representatives election in Wyoming =

- November 2, 1976
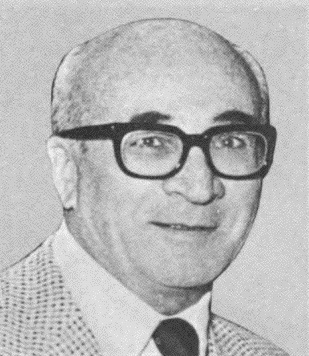

Nominee	Teno Roncalio	Larry Hart
Party	Democratic	Republican
Popular vote	85,721	66,147
Percentage	56.44%	43.56%
U.S. Representative before election
Teno Roncalio
Democratic
Elected U.S. Representative
Teno Roncalio
Democratic

The 1976 United States House of Representatives election in Wyoming was held on November 2, 1976, to elect the single representative from Wyoming's at-large congressional district. Democratic incumbent Teno Roncalio won re-election, defeating Republican Larry Hart with 56.44% of the vote.

As of 2025, this is the last time a Democrat has won a House seat in Wyoming.

== General election ==
=== Candidates ===
- Larry Hart (Republican)
- Teno Roncalio, incumbent representative (1965–1967; 1971–1978) (Democratic)

=== Results ===
1976 United States House of Representatives election in Wyoming results
Party	Candidate	Votes	%
Democratic	Teno Roncalio (incumbent)	85,721	56.44%
Republican	Larry Hart	66,147	43.56%
Total votes		151,868	100.00%
Democratic hold			
