= 1972 Louisiana lieutenant gubernatorial election =

- February 1, 1972

Nominee	Jimmy Fitzmorris	Morley A. Hudson
Party	Democratic	Republican
Popular vote	815,794	218,169
Percentage	76.80%	20.54%
Lieutenant Governor before election
Taddy Aycock
Democratic
Elected Lieutenant Governor
Jimmy Fitzmorris
Democratic

The 1972 Louisiana lieutenant gubernatorial election was held on February 1, 1972, in order to elect the lieutenant governor of Louisiana. Democratic nominee Jimmy Fitzmorris defeated Republican nominee Morley A. Hudson and American nominee Gertrude Taylor.

== General election ==
On election day, February 1, 1972, Democratic nominee Jimmy Fitzmorris won the election by a margin of 597,625 votes against his foremost opponent Republican nominee Morley A. Hudson, thereby retaining Democratic control over the office of lieutenant governor. Fitzmorris was sworn in as the 46th lieutenant governor of Louisiana on May 9, 1972.

=== Results ===
Louisiana lieutenant gubernatorial election, 1972
Party	Candidate	Votes	%
Democratic	Jimmy Fitzmorris	815,794	76.80
Republican	Morley A. Hudson	218,169	20.54
American Party of the United States	Gertrude Taylor	28,316	2.66
Total votes		1,062,279	100.00
Democratic hold			
