= Bill Frederick =

American politician

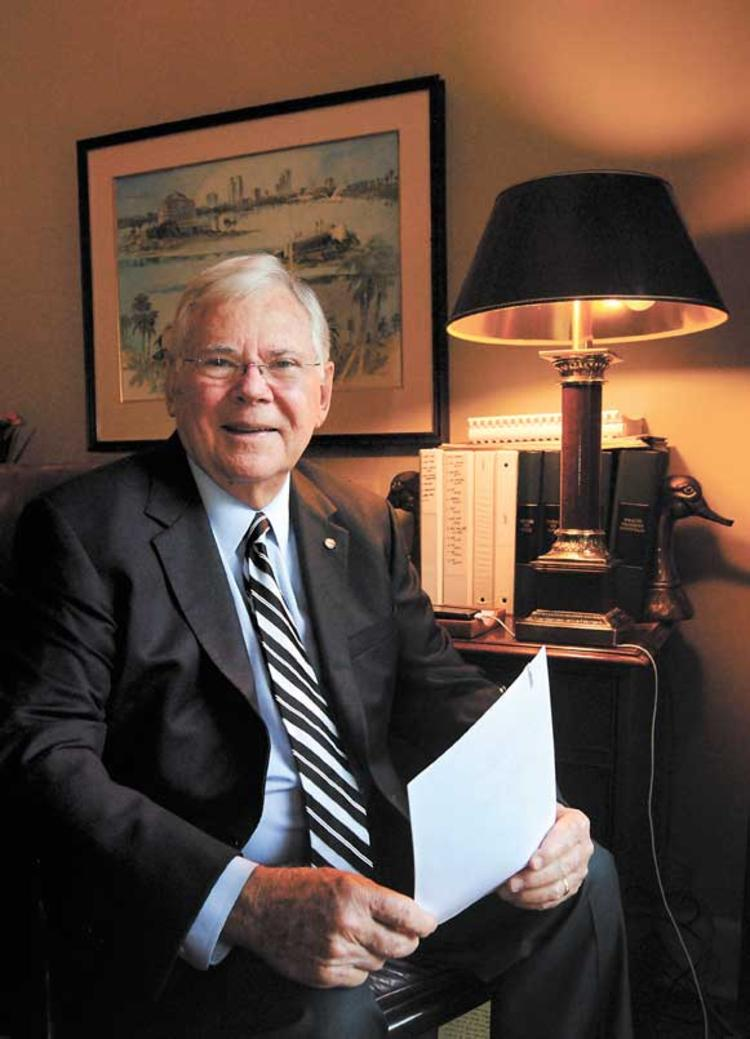

30th Mayor of Orlando
- In office January 1981 – November 1992
- Preceded by: Carl T. Langford
- Succeeded by: Glenda Hood

Personal details
- Born: July 6, 1934 (age 92) Winter Haven, Florida
- Party: Republican (1999–present); Democratic (1981–1999)
- Spouse: Joanne Frederick
- Children: 3
- Education: Duke University (BA)

Military service
- Allegiance: United States
- Branch/service: United States Navy

Willard "Bill" Drawn Frederick (born July 6, 1934) is a former American politician who served as the 30th Mayor of Orlando, Florida, from 1981 to 1992, succeeding after Mayor Carl Langford. Frederick was a member of the Democratic Party until 1999, when he switched to the Republican Party.

He played the part and had a line as a police officer in a scene shot in Orlando for the action film Lethal Weapon 3 in 1992.

== Personal life ==
=== Early life ===
Frederick was born on July 6, 1934. He graduated from Duke University with a bachelor's degree in history and a law degree from the University of Florida Levin College of Law. Served as a paralegal in the United States Navy, and was a member the Navy Pistol Team. He arrived to Orlando, Florida in 1961.

== Recognition ==
=== Awards ===
Mayor Frederick was awarded Orlando's Key of the City. In 2010, he received the Orlando Business Journal's award for Most Influential Businessman Legacy Award.

== See also ==
- 1980 Orlando mayoral election
- 1984 Orlando mayoral election
- 1988 Orlando mayoral election

Political offices
Preceded by Carl T. Langford	Mayor of Orlando; 1981 – 1992	Succeeded by Glenda Hood
