= 1972 Ontario municipal elections =

Municipalities across the Canadian province of Ontario held elections on December 4, 1972, to elect mayors, reeves, councillors, and school trustees. Some municipalities also held votes for utility commissioners.

The most closely watched contest was in Toronto, where Red Tory candidate David Crombie was elected as mayor.
