= 1972 Cambodian constitutional referendum =

- 30 April 1972

Results
Choice	Votes	%
Yes	1,608,293	97.50%
No	41,172	2.50%
Valid votes	1,649,465	99.95%
Invalid or blank votes	866	0.05%
Total votes	1,650,331	100.00%

A constitutional referendum was held in Cambodia on 30 April 1972. The changes were approved by 97.5% of voters.

== Results ==
Choice	Votes	%
For	1,608,293	97.50
Against	41,172	2.50
Total	1,649,465	100.00
Valid votes	1,649,465	99.95
Invalid/blank votes	866	0.05
Total votes	1,650,331	100.00
Source: Nohlen et al.
