= 1976 Portland, Oregon, mayoral election =

- May 25, 1976
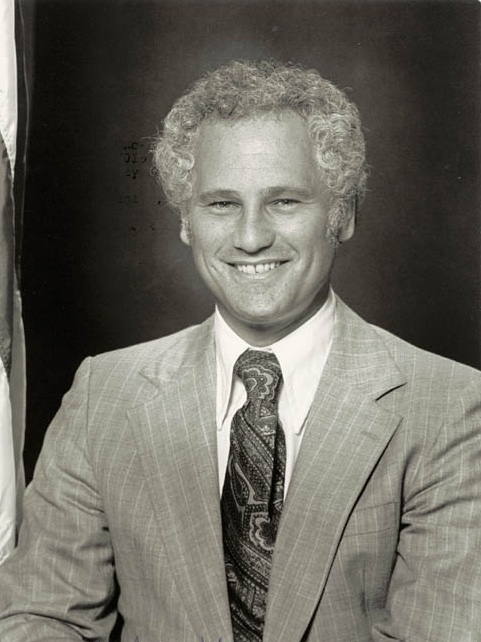

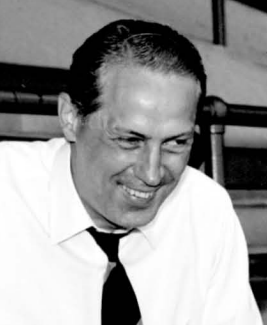
Nominee	Neil Goldschmidt	Frank Ivancie
Popular vote	74,753	59,002
Percentage	53.14%	41.94%
Mayor before election
Neil Goldschmidt
Elected mayor
Neil Goldschmidt

On May 25, 1976, an election was held in Portland, Oregon, to elect the mayor. Incumbent mayor Neil Goldschmidt won reelection, defeating city commissioner Frank Ivancie.

Portland uses a nonpartisan system for local elections, in which all voters are eligible to participate. All candidates are listed on the ballot without any political party affiliation.

All candidates meeting the qualifications competed in a blanket primary election on May 25, 1976. Because Goldschmidt received an absolute majority of the vote in the primary election, no run-off election was held.

== Candidates ==
- Neil Goldschmidt, incumbent mayor
- Joseph L. Harris
- Francis J. (Frank) Ivancie, city commissioner
- George E. Kontanis
- Glen Livingston
- Craig Schulze
- Stan Terry
- Cliff Walker
- Jimmy Kelly
- Billy Lamar
- Mildred Schwab, city commissioner

== Results ==
1976 Portland mayoral election
Party	Candidate	Votes	%
Nonpartisan	Neil Goldschmidt (incumbent)	74,753	53.14
Nonpartisan	Frank Ivancie	59,002	41.94
Nonpartisan	Stan Terry	2,922	2.07
Nonpartisan	Glen Livingston	890	0.63
Nonpartisan	George E. Kontanis	877	0.62
Nonpartisan	Joseph L. Harris	811	0.57
Nonpartisan	Craig Schulze	591	0.42
Nonpartisan	Cliff Walker	555	0.39
Nonpartisan	Mildred Schwab	92	0.06
Nonpartisan	Billy Lamar	47	0.03
Nonpartisan	Jimmy Kelly	33	0.02
Write-in		90	0.06
Total votes		140,663	100
