= Idalia Gumbs =

Anguillan politician

2001 stamp honouring Britannia Gumbs

Britannia Idalia Gumbs (née Carter; 17 June 1933 – 11 September 2000) was an Anguillan politician. She was the first woman to sit in the Anguilla House of Assembly.

Gumbs was born in Sandy Hill, Anguilla, the daughter of Ashton Murray Carter and Mary M. Chance.

She was named to the Anguilla Council in 1972. In 1976, Gumbs was elected to the Anguilla assembly, serving until 1980. Although a member of the government, Gumbs was opposed to Ronald Webster's dictatorial style of government and, in particular, was opposed to his handling of a land dispute. In 1977, she seconded a motion of no confidence against Webster's government. In the government formed after the motion succeeded, She served on the executive council as Minister of Natural Resources and Tourism. She was a founding member of the Anguilla National Alliance in 1980.

In 2001, Anguilla issued a stamp bearing her image; this was associated with the United Nations Women's Human Rights Campaign.
