= 1972 United Kingdom local elections =

Map showing political control in local government districts in England and Wales following the 1972 local elections. Conservative Labour Independent or non-political Liberal No overall control

Local elections were held in borough and district councils in the United Kingdom in 1972, during the life of the Conservative government of Edward Heath. They were the last such elections in England and Wales to be held prior to major structural changes to councils brought about by the Local Government Act 1972.

The council seats up for election were previously fought in 1969, when the opposition Labour Party had been in government and had suffered poor results. It was therefore expected Labour would make substantial gains in 1972, although the Conservative position in opinion polls had improved somewhat since the 1971 local elections.

Labour won the bulk of councils, although the continued existence of Conservative aldermen prevented their dominance being as great as the Conservatives' had been in 1969. (Note: Aldermen would be abolished in 1974 without Greater London and 1978 within.) The presence of Conservative aldermen deprived Labour of overall control in Cardiff, Huddersfield, Ipswich, Newcastle upon Tyne, Northampton, Oxford, Southampton, Wolverhampton and York.

Since the 1971 local elections, the average swing from Labour to Conservative was 3.4%, which represented a recovery in votes of nearly a third of Conservative losses incurred between the 1970 and 1971 local elections. Their recovery was lower in areas that had been most badly affected by unemployment (1.4% in Wales, 0.7% in Scotland and 2.1% in England north of a line between Morecambe Bay and the river Wear).

The Liberal Party's vote share increased 2.5% on 1971. They were strengthened in Liverpool and managed to retain once safe Labour wards in Birmingham, Leeds and Sheffield.

The Scottish National Party lost votes; Plaid Cymru retained its small vote. The anti-immigration National Front polled 11% in the wards it contested in Bradford (down from 15% in 1971) and 8% of the wards it contested in Leicester.
