= 1984 Orlando mayoral election =

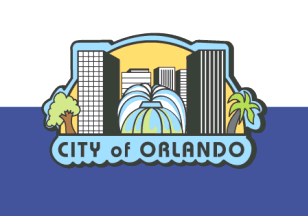
- September 4, 1984
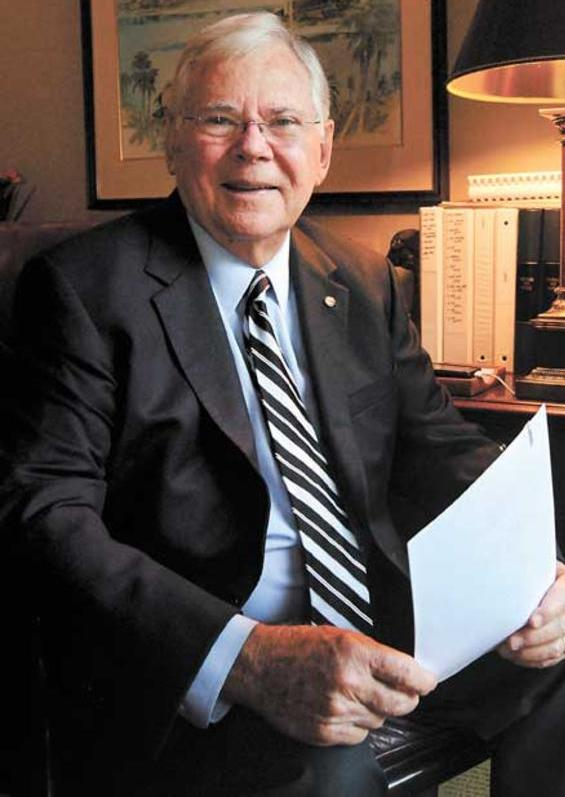

| Candidate | Bill Frederick | Dale C. Smith | Tim Adams |
| Party | Nonpartisan | Nonpartisan | Nonpartisan |
| Popular vote | 14,861 | 3,907 | 3,167 |
| Percentage | 67.75% | 17.81% | 14.44% |
Mayor before election
Bill Frederick
Nonpartisan
Elected mayor
Bill Frederick
Nonpartisan

The 1984 Orlando mayoral election took place on September 4, 1984. Incumbent Mayor Bill Frederick ran for re-election to a second term. He faced two little-known opponents in the election: city planner Dale Smith, who had unsuccessfully run against Frederick in 1980, and financial planner Tim Adams. The Orlando Sentinel endorsed Frederick for re-election, noting that voters should have "no hesitation" in re-electing him, because he was "the only one of the three candidates who offers th[e] potential" to deal with the city's problems. Frederick ultimately won re-election in a landslide, receiving 68 percent of the vote to Smith's 18 percent and Adams's 14 percent.

== General election ==
=== Candidates ===
- Bill Frederick, incumbent Mayor
- Dale C. Smith, city planner, 1980 candidate for Mayor
- Tim Adams, financial planner

=== Results ===
1984 Orlando mayoral election results
| Party | Candidate | Votes | % |
|---|---|---|---|
| Nonpartisan | Bill Frederick (inc.) | 14,861 | 67.75% |
| Nonpartisan | Dale C. Smith | 3,907 | 17.81% |
| Nonpartisan | Tim Adams | 3,167 | 14.44% |
| Total votes | | 21,935 | 100.00% |
