= George L. Stuart Jr. =

American politician

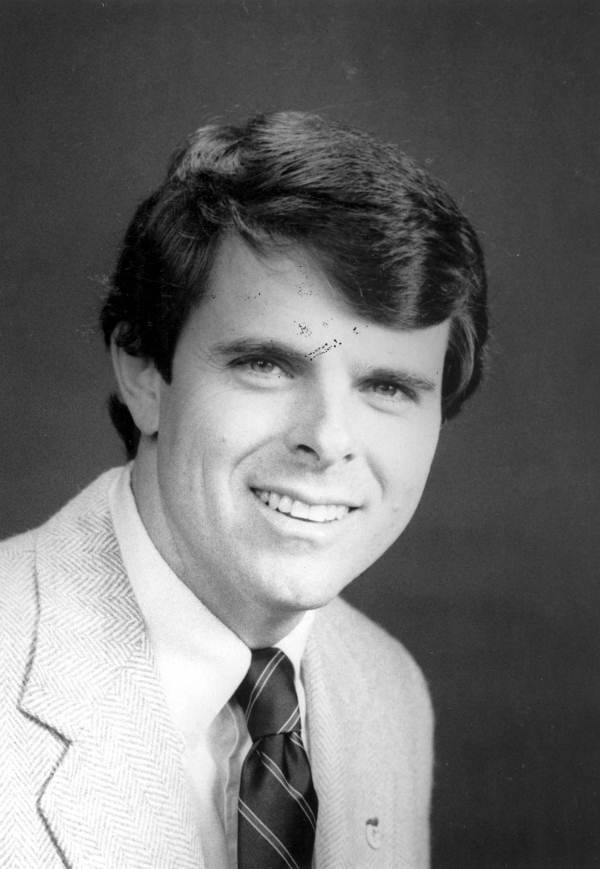
- Stuart in 1980

Member of the Florida Senate from the 14th district
- In office 1978–1990

Personal details
- Party: Democratic

George L. Stuart Jr. is an American former politician. A Democrat, he served in the Florida Senate between 1978 and 1990, representing the 14th district.

== Early life ==
His mother was Georgia Lee "Vicki" Stuart and his father was George L. Stuart Sr., who owned an office supply company, George Stuart Inc. He has four brothers, Jacob V., Charles S. and Robert F. and four children Ann-Elizabeth, George, Caroline and Kathryn. His brother Jacob is also involved in politics, assisting with various political campaigns.

== Career ==
Stuart received a B.A. degree in Economics from the University of Florida and an M.B.A. from Harvard University's Graduate School of Business. He was elected to the Orlando City Council in 1972, served in the Florida State Senate for the 14th district from 1978 until 1990 as a member of the Democratic Party, and ran for governor. After his tenure in the state senate he was Secretary and Chief Executive Officer of the State of Florida's Department of Business and Professional Regulation from 1991 until January 1995.

Party political offices
Preceded by Ken Jenne	Democratic nominee for Treasurer, Insurance Commissioner, and Fire Marshal of Florida; 1990	Succeeded by Bill Nelson
