= 1976 Lebanese presidential election =

- 8 May 1976

99 members of the Parliament 50 votes needed to win
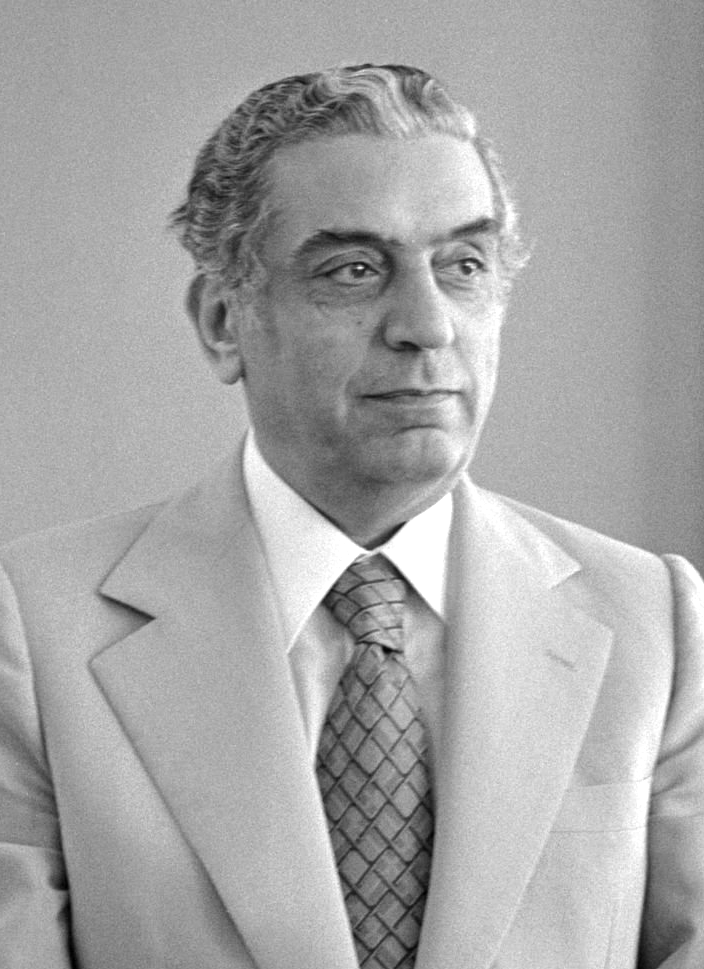
| Nominee | Élias Sarkis |
| Party | Chehabist |
| Electoral vote | 66 |
| Percentage | 66% |
President before election
Suleiman Frangieh
Marada Movement
Elected President
Élias Sarkis
Chehabist

An indirect presidential election was held in the Parliament of Lebanon on 8 May 1976, resulting in MP Élias Sarkis being elected President of the Lebanese Republic.

By convention, the presidency is always attributed to a Maronite Christian. Under the article 49 of the Lebanese Constitution, a qualified majority of two-thirds of the members of the then 99-seat Lebanese Parliament is required to elect the president in the first round. After the second round of election, the president is elected by an absolute majority of the total number of deputies in office.

Élias Sarkis, the Chehabist nominee in the 1970 election - who lost the vote by a margin of only 1 vote - was elected on the second round of voting with 66% of the votes. He was the only person to receive a vote during the election, all other ballots containing blank votes. Almost a third of MPs were absent from the parliamentary session.

== Results ==
Only 69 MPs were present (out of 99). Due to the exceptional circumstances of armed clashes between the PLO and Phalangist militias, the constitution was amended for the election to take place multiple months before the incumbent president's term expired - in May 1976, while Frangieh's mandate ended in September. As the candidate with 49% of votes in the previous election, Sarkis was automatically assumed the presumptive nominee.

In the first round, Sarkis fell short of the 2/3 threshold needed by 3 votes, therefore the election proceeded to the second round. He was elected president with 66 votes (4 more than in the first round) in the second round.

As outgoing President Frangieh's term expired on 23 September of that year, he was therefore sworn on multiple months after the election.

| Candidate | First round | | Second round | |
| Candidate | Votes | % | Votes | % |
|---|---|---|---|---|
| Élias Sarkis | 63 | 63 | 66 | 66 |
| Blank ballot | 5 | – | 3 | – |
| Total | 68 | 68 | 69 | 69 |
Source: The Monthly

== Aftermath ==
It was hoped that Sarkis would be able to unite the warring factions and end the emerging civil war; by September 1976, however, the situation had grown past the government's control as Syria and other countries began interfering and complicating the situation.
