= 1976 Anguillian general election =

General elections were held in Anguilla on 15 March 1976. The result was a victory for the People's Progressive Party, which won six of the seven seats in the House of Assembly.

== Background ==
The elections were the first held under a new constitution, which provided for a Legislative Assembly with seven elected members, two appointed members and three ex-officio members (the Attorney General, Chief Secretary and Financial Secretary) and a Speaker.

== Results ==
Everet Romney and Clive Smith were appointed as the nominated members.

| Party | Votes | % | Seats | +/– |
|---|---|---|---|---|
| People's Progressive Party | | | 6 | 0 |
| Independents | | | 1 | 0 |
| Appointed members | | | 2 | +1 |
| Total | | | 9 | +1 |
| Total votes | 2,725 | – | | |
| Registered voters/turnout | 3,802 | 71.67 | | |
Source: Caribbean Elections
