= Bob Carr (Florida politician) =

American politician (1899–1967)

Robert Spencer Carr (July 13, 1899 – January 29, 1967) was mayor of Orlando, Florida from 1956 to 1967. The Bob Carr Performing Arts Centre is named for him.

Carr was born in 1899 in Toledo, Ohio to William C. and Cora Elizabeth Carr. In 1939, Carr (then a businessman) organized the Community Chest of Orlando, the community's first annual fund drive conducted to support local charitable organizations and the forerunner of the Heart of Florida United Way organization. In 1945, while he was serving as president of the Greater Orlando Chamber of Commerce, he contributed to the establishment of the Orlando Negro Chamber of Commerce, the predecessor to the African American Chamber of Commerce of Central Florida. In 1954 he was one of a group of Florida community leaders who established the state's Easter Seals organization. Carr was among the Central Florida civic leaders who established the Florida Symphony Orchestra, having also served as its President.

As mayor he formed a Human Relations Committee to address race relations and peacefully desegregate the community.

The defining event in shaping modern Orlando occurred during Carr's term as mayor when, in 1965, Walt Disney announced plans to build Walt Disney World outside the city.

Carr died while in office on January 29, 1967 after suffering a heart attack. He was buried in Greenwood Cemetery. Carl T. Langford succeeded him as mayor. His son, Robert Carr, Jr., has been active in Orlando politics and was the college roommate at Vanderbilt of future Southwest and Big 12 Conferences assistant commissioner Bo Carter.
