= National Front (Czechoslovakia) =

National Front of Czechs and Slovaks Národní fronta Čechů a Slováků (Czech) Národný front Čechov a Slovákov (Slovak)
- Founded: 22 March 1945
- Dissolved: 7 February 1990
- Headquarters: Prague, Czechoslovakia
- Newspaper: Mladá fronta (1945–1953)
- Ideology: 1945–1948: Anti-fascism; State socialism Social democracy Christian democracy 1948–1990: Communism; Marxism–Leninism; Stalinism (until 1956)
- Political position: Far-left

The National Front (Czech: Národní fronta; Slovak: Národný front), also known as the National Front of Czechs and Slovaks was a political coalition created in 1945 serving as united front of political parties for liberation of Czechoslovakia, after 1948 organized solely by the Communist Party of Czechoslovakia (KSČ). It was the vehicle for control of all political and social activity by the KSČ.

== 1945–1948 ==
As World War II began, Czechoslovakia disappeared from the map of Europe. The Czech lands became the Protectorate of Bohemia and Moravia under direct Nazi rule, while Slovakia ostensibly became independent. At the end of World War II, Czechoslovakia was included in the sphere of influence of the Soviet Union. Postwar Czechoslovakia was organized according to a program worked out by the KSČ (whose leaders were in exile in Moscow), and Edvard Beneš, representing the government-in-exile in London—these being the two most important groups seeking the reconstitution of the country. Part of the program was the formation of a popular anti-Nazi coalition of parties. Negotiations began in December 1943 in Moscow. The KSČ and the non-Communist parties had very different ideas about this.

This coalition was established as the "National Front" in April 1945, when a Czechoslovak government came into being in the city of Košice, recently liberated by Soviet troops. The model of government was adopted from similar French tripartisme.

The Slovak People's Party was banned due to its collaboration with the Nazis. The government decided not to allow the re-creation of other pre-war democratic parties, such as the Republican Party of Farmers and Peasants, due to its lead of the Party of National Unity.

The National Front was dominated by the socialist parties: KSČ (which held key ministerial offices), KSS and ČSSD.

The Communists viewed the National Front as a permanent entity, while the remaining parties considered it a temporary coalition until normal conditions would arise in Czechoslovakia. Many quarrels arose between the KSČ and the remaining parties of the National Front in the transitory period 1945–1948.

=== Political parties (1945–1948) ===
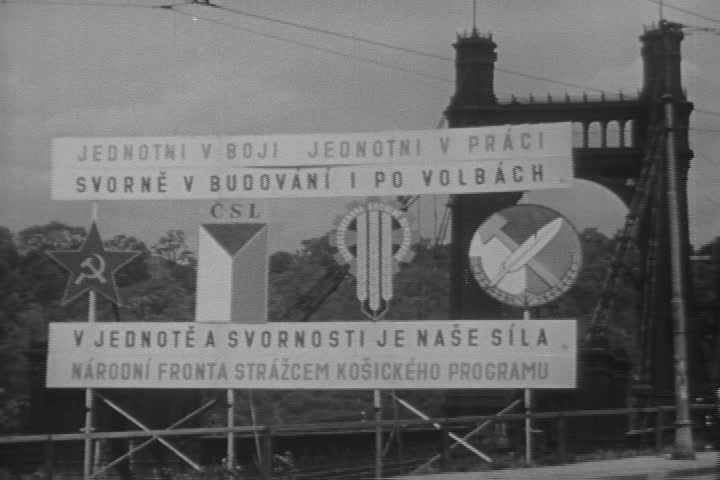
Poster of the National Front in the Czech lands, 1947

Organization	Emblem	Foundation	Seats in the CNA (1946)	Ideology	Range
Communist Party of Czechoslovakia		16 May 1921	93	Communism, Marxism–Leninism	Czech lands
Communist Party of Slovakia		May 1939	21	Communism, Marxism–Leninism	Slovakia
Democratic Party		December 1944	43	Conservatism, Agrarianism	Slovakia
Czechoslovak Social Democracy		7 April 1878	37	Social democracy, Centrist Marxism	Czech lands
Czechoslovak National Social Party		4 April 1897	55	Social liberalism, Popular socialism	Czech lands
Czechoslovak People's Party		3 January 1919	46	Christian democracy, Social conservatism	Czech lands
Freedom Party		March 1946	3	Christian democracy, Republicanism	Slovakia
Labour Party		March 1946	2	Social democracy	Slovakia

== 1948–1990 ==
The KSČ definitively seized power in Czechoslovakia on 25 February 1948. The other parties were quickly purged of their more courageous elements, and also dropped their original ideologies. The Front took on a character similar to similar alliances in the Communist bloc. All member parties accepted the "leading role" of the KSČ as a condition of their continued existence.

After the 1948 coup, the member parties were:

- Communist Party of Czechoslovakia (KSČ), incorporated also the ČSSD in June 1948
- Communist Party of Slovakia (CPS), merged with the KSČ in September 1948
- Czechoslovak People's Party (ČSL)
- Czechoslovak Socialist Party (ČSS), which had dropped "National" from its name
- (Slovak) Freedom Party (SSL)
- Party of Slovak Revival (SSO) (a pro-Communist reincarnation of the Democratic Party)

The nonsocialist members of the Front were allowed to maintain their existence. Some sources say that it was just an act by KSČ to keep up an appearance of plurality. However, no one could take part in the political process without KSČ approval.

The other parties were structured just like the Communists, with a secretariat, central committee, and Presidium. Despite their actual impotence and subservience, they retained significant memberships through the entire Communist era. In 1984, the CPP had about 66,000 members, and the CNSP had about 17,000 members. Voters were presented with a single list of National Front-approved candidates, which was usually approved by margins of well over 99 percent against fewer than one percent who either rejected the list or cast blank or spoiled ballots. Non-KSČ candidates were represented, but seats were allocated in accordance with a set quota that guaranteed a large Communist majority.

In 1969, the country was re-organized as a federation of the Czech Socialist Republic and Slovak Socialist Republic. Separate National Front organizations for each federal component were set up, which nominated candidates for the Czech National Council and Slovak National Council.

In other Communist states, there were similar coalitions with identical names (in East Germany) or similar names, (Poland, Bulgaria, and Vietnam).

=== Political parties (1948–1990) ===
Order of the Red Star of the National Front, symbol of communist vanguard leadership after 1948

Organization	Emblem	Foundation	Ideology	Range
Communist Party of Czechoslovakia		16 May 1921	Communism, Marxism–Leninism	Czech lands
Communist Party of Slovakia		May 1939	Communism, Marxism–Leninism	Slovakia
Party of Slovak Revival		23 March 1948	Christian socialism	Slovakia
Czechoslovak People's Party		3 January 1919	Christian socialism	Czech lands
Czechoslovak Socialist Party		4 April 1897	Liberal socialism	Czech lands
Freedom Party		March 1946	Liberal socialism	Slovakia

== Other civil organizations ==
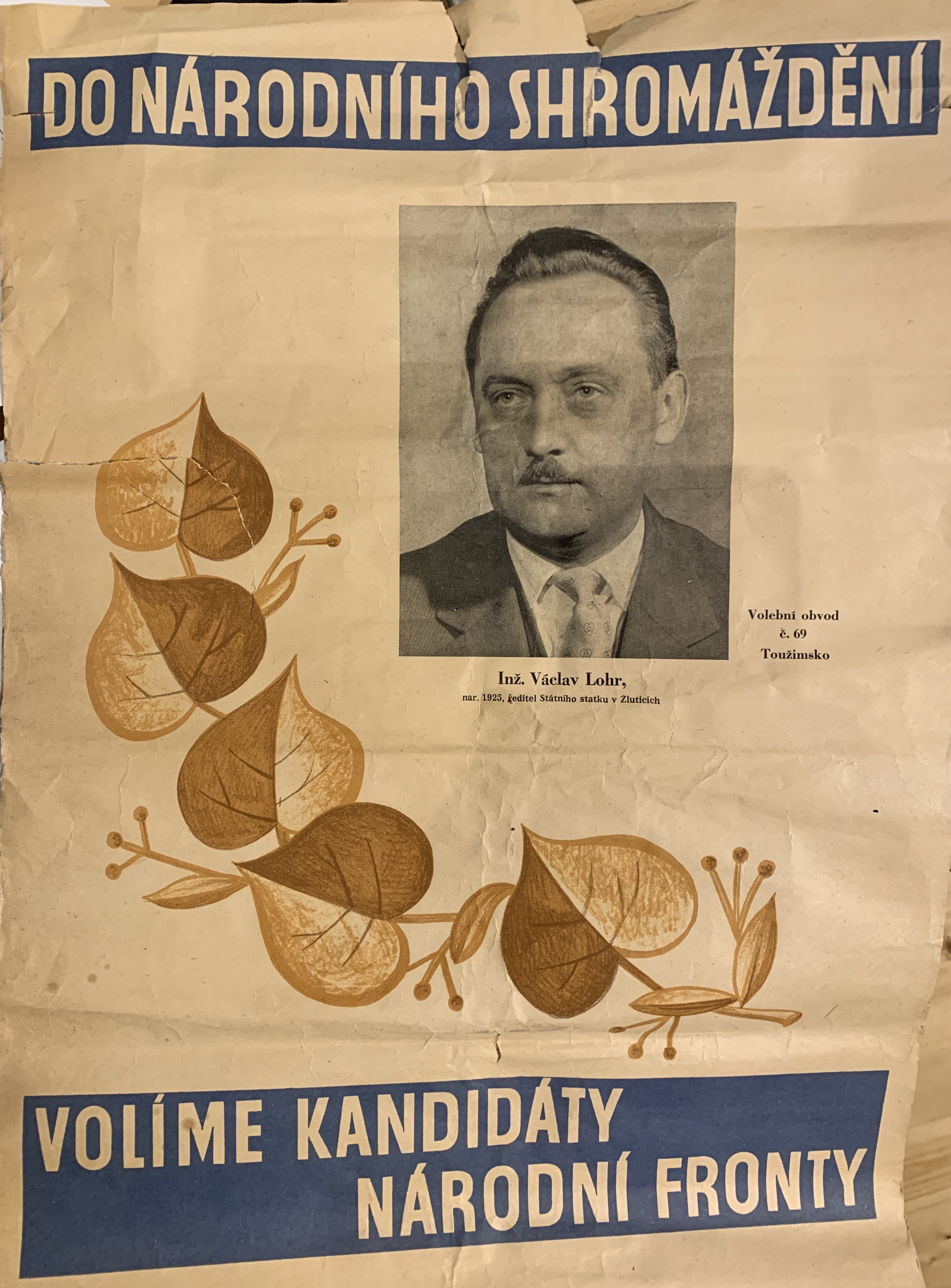
Electoral poster for the 1960 Czechoslovak election included individual candidates preference voting

After the 1948 coup, the National Front was converted into a broad-based patriotic organization that controlled nearly all organized activity in the country, excluding only religion. Thus the Front was extended to include mass organizations that were not political parties. Among the other member organizations which were made full members were:

- Revolutionary Trade Union Movement (to which all unions belonged)
- Czechoslovak Socialist Youth Union (1.5 million members)
- Union for Czechoslovak-Soviet Friendship
- Czechoslovak Union of Women (1 million members)
- Czechoslovak Red Cross
- Union of Agricultural Cooperatives
- Union of Anti-Fascist Fighters
- Svazarm (Union for Cooperation with the Army)
- National Peace Committee
- Physical Culture Association
- Union of Philatelists

All these groups were given the standard Communist organization, and Party members held all controlling positions in these, even as they did not send elected deputies to parliament. This ensured that no secular organization could exist wholly independent of KSČ leadership. These groups permeated workplaces, schools, and neighborhoods. As with the Front, many of these organizations added Czech and Slovak regional components in 1969 and after.

== End of the National Front ==
After the Velvet Revolution of 1989 ended Communist rule, the National Front was dissolved.

== Electoral history ==
=== National Assembly elections ===
Election	Votes	%	Seats	+/–	Position
1948	6,424,734	89.2%	300 / 300	▲300	New
1954	8,484,102	97.9%	368 / 368	▲68	1st
1960	9,059,838	99.9%	300 / 300	▼68	1st
1964	9,412,309	99.9%	300 / 300	Steady	1st

=== House of the People and House of Nations elections ===
Election	Votes	%	House of the People seats	+/–	Position	Votes	%	House of Nations seats	+/–	Position
1971	10,153,572		200 / 200	▼100	1st	10,144,464		150 / 150	▲150	1st
1976	10,605,762	99.97%	200 / 200	Steady	1st	10,605,672	99.97%	150 / 150	Steady	1st
1981	10,725,609	99.96%	200 / 200	Steady	1st	10,725,895	99.96%	150 / 150	Steady	1st
1986	10,871,881	99.4%	200 / 200	Steady	1st			150 / 150	Steady	1st

== See also ==
- Polish Committee of National Liberation/Front of National Unity/Patriotic Movement for National Rebirth
- Politics of Communist Czechoslovakia
- Vietnamese Fatherland Front
- National Front of the German Democratic Republic
- Fatherland Front
- People's Democratic Front/Front of Socialist Unity and Democracy
- United Front
- Democratic Front for the Reunification of Korea
- Lao Front for National Development
- National United Front of Kampuchea
