= 1980 Orlando mayoral election =

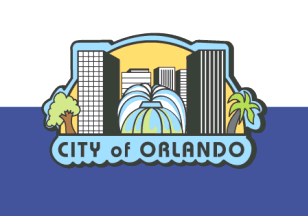
- September 9, 1980
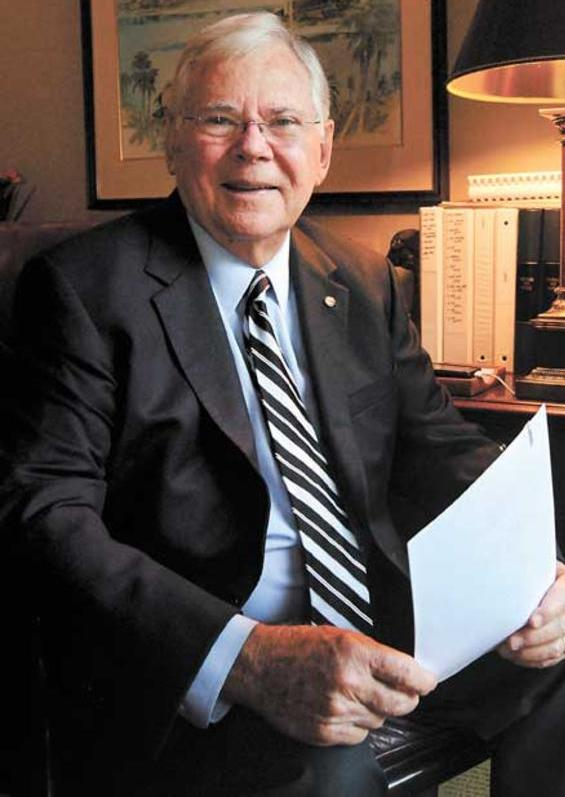

Candidate	Bill Frederick	Shelton Adams	Dale C. Smith
Party	Nonpartisan	Nonpartisan	Nonpartisan
Popular vote	15,960	5,481	1,982
Percentage	68.14%	23.40%	8.46%
Mayor before election
Carl T. Langford
Nonpartisan
Elected mayor
Bill Frederick
Nonpartisan

The 1980 Orlando mayoral election took place on September 9, 1980. Incumbent Mayor Carl T. Langford declined to seek re-election to a fourth term. Three candidates ran to succeed him: attorney Bill Frederick, City Commissioner Shelton Adams, and city planner Dale Smith.

Adams and Frederick emerged as the frontrunners, but one month prior to the election, the race was upended when the IRS opened a criminal investigation into Adams's finances. Adams denied any wrongdoing, and alleged that the probe was politically motivated. The Sentinel Star endorsed Frederick, praising him as "hav[ing] the best chance to unite this community behind a city government that works for all its citizens," and criticizing Adams's "burning ambition for the mayor's office."

Frederick ultimately won the election in a landslide, receiving 68 percent of the vote to Adams's 23 percent and Smith's 8 percent. Shortly after the election, the IRS dropped its investigation into Adams's finances, which he alleged was "brought forward by someone" associated with Frederick.

== General election ==
=== Candidates ===
- Bill Frederick, attorney, Chairman of the Florida Environmental Regulation Commission
- Shelton Adams, City Commissioner
- Dale Smith, senior city planner

==== Declined ====
- Carl T. Langford, incumbent Mayor

=== Results ===
1980 mayoral election results
Party	Candidate	Votes	%
Nonpartisan	Bill Frederick	15,960	68.14%
Nonpartisan	Shelton Adams	5,481	23.40%
Nonpartisan	Dale C. Smith	1,982	8.46%
Total votes		23,423	100.00%
