= Carl T. Langford =

American politician

Mayor of Orlando
- In office March 8, 1967 – October 31, 1980
- Preceded by: Robert S. Carr
- Succeeded by: Don Crenshaw (acting); Bill Frederick

Personal details
- Born: July 23, 1918 Orlando, Florida, U.S.
- Died: July 9, 2011 (aged 92) Orlando, Florida, U.S.

Military service
- Allegiance: United States of America
- Branch/service: United States Army
- Rank: Major

Carl T. Langford (July 23, 1918 – July 9, 2011) was an American politician who was Mayor of Orlando, Florida, from 1967 to 1980. He served in the United States Army from 1941 until 1946 with the rank of Major. He was also one of the first two Eagle Scouts in the state to be awarded the Distinguished Eagle Scout Award. Returning to Florida after his military service, Carl attended the University of Florida and graduated Magna Cum Laude in 1948.

Langford died July 9, 2011, at age 92. He was interred at Greenwood Cemetery. Sigma Alpha Epsilon University of Florida 1936 -1948.

Political offices
Preceded by Robert S. "Bob" Carr	Mayor of Orlando; 1967 – 1980	Succeeded by Bill Frederick
