= Party of Slovak Revival =

Party of Slovak Revival Strana slovenskej obrody
- Founded: 23 March 1948
- Dissolved: 10 December 1989
- Preceded by: Democratic Party
- Succeeded by: Democratic Party
- Headquarters: Bratislava, Czechoslovakia
- Newspaper: The People (Ľud)
- Ideology: Christian socialism
- National affiliation: National Front

The Party of Slovak Revival (Slovak: Strana slovenskej obrody, SSO) was a political party founded in March 1948 by members of the Slovak Democratic Party, which collapsed after February's 1948 Czechoslovak coup d'état. It was accepted into the Czechoslovak National Front and got 17 seats in the Slovak parliament (Communists had 78 and the Freedom Party 4 seats). Jozef Mjartan, chairman of the SSO was the interim chairman of the Slovak parliament from 15 to 23 June 1958 and the party (as a satellite of the Communist party) had representatives in other government bodies during the Communist era. The Party of Slovak Revival broke with the Communist Party in 1989 and re-named to the Democratic Party, but did not gain any importance in Slovak politics.

== Leadership ==
- Ján Ševčík (1948–1951)
- Jozef Kyselý (1951–1965)
- Jozef Mjartan (1966–1983)
- Jozef Šimúth (1983–1989)

== See also ==
- National Front (Czechoslovakia)
