= Freedom Party (Slovakia) =

Freedom Party Strana slobody
- Founded: March 1946
- Dissolved: 1990
- Split from: Democratic Party
- Headquarters: Bratislava, Czechoslovakia
- Newspaper: Sloboda
- Ideology: Christian democracy Republicanism
- Political position: Centre
- National affiliation: National Front (1946–1989)

The Freedom Party (Slovak: Strana slobody) originally Christian-Republican Party (Kresťansko-republikánska strana) was a political party in Slovakia.

It was founded by some members of the Democratic Party in March 1946 as a party mainly for Catholics. Its aim was to present an alternative of “Christian, progressive and pro-Czechoslovak″ politics to the Democratic Party. The Freedom Party was led by Vavro Šrobár and won 3 seats in the Czechoslovak parliament in the 1946 election. The party was main platform for the so-called Hlasists.

When the Communists took power in Czechoslovakia in February 1948, the party lost any practical power and became playing role of a bloc party in the National Front. Its newspaper was called Sloboda (Freedom).

During the communist rule, some Slovak intellectuals in opposition to the regime were concentrated in the party, with its peak during the Prague Spring in 1968.

After the Velvet Revolution, in 1990, the party adopted a new, Christian programme, but remained without any importance in Slovak politics.

== See also ==
- National Front (Czechoslovakia)
