= List of Slovak politicians =

A list of notable politicians from Slovakia. Note this list is missing some of the former presidents of Czechoslovakia of Slovak origin or higher-ranking officials which should be added for a more complete list.

== A ==
- Miroslav Abelovský
- Marta Aibeková
- Marián Andel

== B ==
- Peter Baco
- Edit Bauer
- Rudolf Bauer
- Irena Belohorská
- Július Binder
- Vasiľ Biľak
- Zoltán Boros
- Martin Bútora

== C ==
- Rudolf Chmel
- Bohuslav Chňoupek
- Vladimír Clementis
- Peter Colotka
- Pál Csáky

== D ==
- Ivan Dérer
- Michal Drobný
- Alexander Dubček
- Ján Ducký
- Árpád Duka-Zólyomi

== E ==
- János Esterházy

== F ==
- Martin Fedor
- Robert Fico
- Ján Figeľ
- Monika Flašíková-Beňová
- Pavol Frešo
- Martin Fronc

== G ==
- Ján Gabriel
- László Gyurovszky

== H ==
- Pavol Hamžík
- Štefan Harabin
- Jozef Heriban
- Andrej Hlinka
- Milan Hodža
- Zoltán Horváth
- Pavel Hrivnák
- Pavol Hrušovský
- Jozef Miloslav Hurban
- Gustáv Husák

== J ==
- Ľubomír Jahnátek

== K ==
- Robert Kaliňák
- Ľudovít Kaník
- Irena Káňová
- Imrich Karvaš
- František Kašický
- Ivan Knotek
- Ján Kollár
- Sergej Kozlík
- Zdenka Kramplová
- Eduard Kukan
- Miroslav Kusý
- László Köteles
- Milan Kňažko

== L ==
- Ján Langoš
- Jozef Lenárt
- Ivan Lexa
- Daniel Lipšic

== M ==
- Alexander Mach
- Jirko Malchárek
- Marek Maďarič
- Vladimír Mečiar
- Jozef Migaš
- Ivan Mikloš
- František Mikloško
- Ján Mikolaj

== N ==
- Robert Nemcsics

== O ==
- Štefan Osuský

== P ==
- Vladimír Palko
- Pavol Paška
- Zita Pleštinská
- Ján Počiatek
- István Pásztor

== R ==
- Richard Raši
- Pavol Rusko

== S ==
- Dušan Slobodník
- Ján Slota
- Richard Sulík

== See also ==
- Politics of Slovakia
