= Dubova Colonorum =

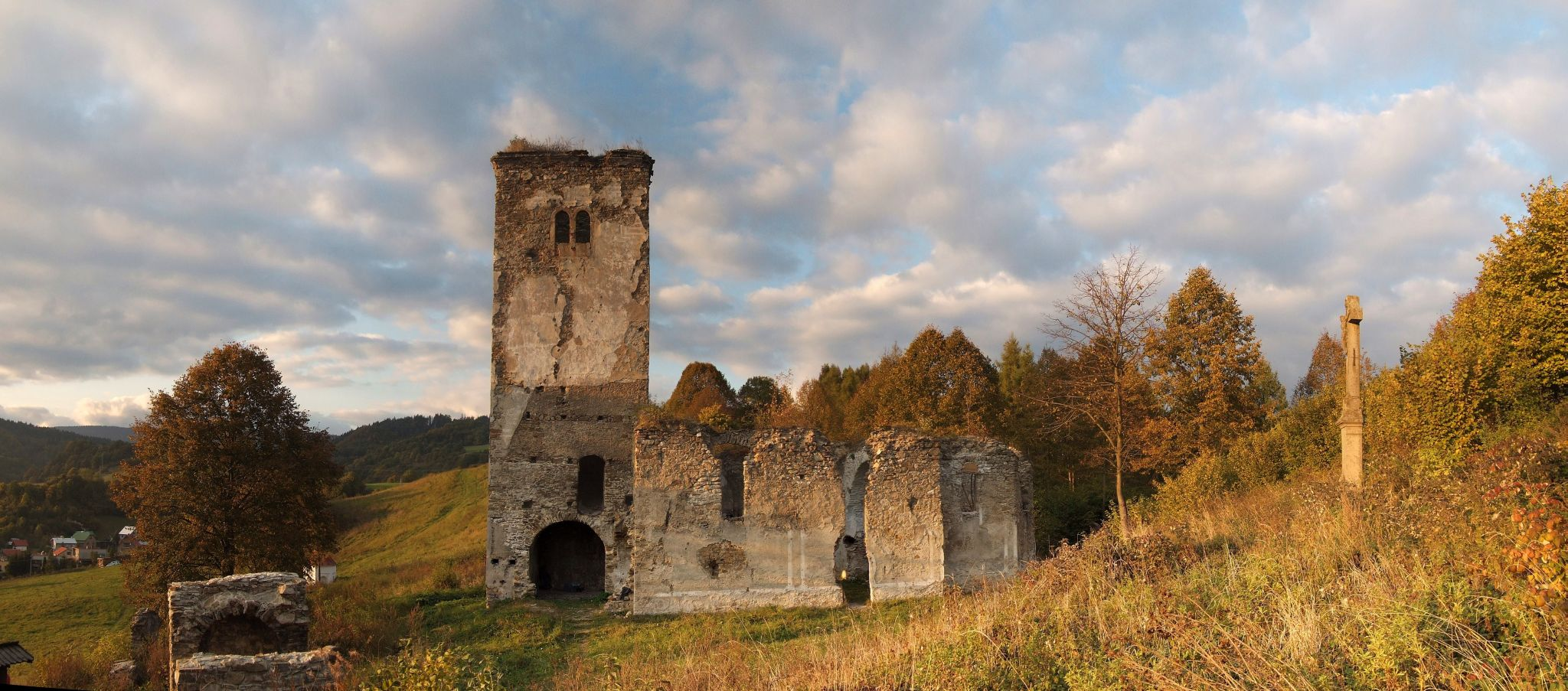
Church of Saints Cosmas and Damian in Sedliacka Dubová, Slovakia

Dubova Colonorum is a volunteer camp aiming to restore the ruins of a medieval church dedicated to Sts. Cosmas and Damian, near Sedliacka Dubová in Orava region of Slovakia. Project started in 1998 as a sister project of Katarínka and, since then, hundreds of young people mostly from Slovakia and also from other countries participated.

The camp has a specific style: volunteers live in medieval atmosphere, isolated from civilization (they don't use watches, cell phones etc.) and live in tent. They are members of order inspired by Franciscan spirituality and wear habit of burlap. Part of the day is spent at work on the ruins.
