= List of prime ministers of the Slovak Socialist Republic =

This is a list of prime ministers of the Slovak Socialist Republic.

1 January 1969 – 5 March 1990: called "Slovak Socialist Republic" within the Czechoslovak Socialist Republic.
6 March 1990 – 31 December 1992: called "Slovak Republic" within the Czech and Slovak Federative Republic.

1. Štefan Sádovský: 2 January 1969 – 5 May 1969
2. Peter Colotka: 5 May 1969 – 12 October 1988
3. Ivan Knotek: 13 October 1988 – 22 June 1989
4. Pavel Hrivnák: 23 June 1989 – 8 December 1989
5. Milan Čič: 10 December 1989 – 27 June 1990
6. Vladimír Mečiar: 27 June 1990 – 6 May 1991
7. Ján Čarnogurský: 6 May 1991 – 24 June 1992
8. Vladimír Mečiar: 24 June 1992 – 31 December 1992

== See also ==
- List of presidents of Czechoslovakia
- List of prime ministers of Czechoslovakia
- President of Slovakia
- Prime Minister of Slovakia
- Lists of office-holders
