= Politics of Slovakia =

Politics of Slovakia Politika Slovenska
- Coat of arms of Slovakia
- Polity type: Unitary parliamentary republic
- Constitution: Constitution of the Slovak Republic (1992)
- Formation: 1 January 1993

Legislative branch
- Name: National Council
- Type: Unicameral
- Meeting place: Parliament Building, Bratislava
- Presiding officer: Richard Raši, Speaker of the National Council of Slovakia
- Appointer: Open list proportional representation with a 5% electoral threshold (7% for two-, three-party alliances; 10% for four-or-more party alliance) allocated under the largest remainder method with Hagenbach-Bischoff quota

Executive branch
- Head of state
- Title: President
- Currently: Peter Pellegrini
- Appointer: Direct popular vote, two-round system
- Head of government
- Title: Prime Minister
- Currently: Robert Fico
- Appointer: National Council
- Cabinet
- Name: Government of Slovakia
- Current cabinet: Fico's Fourth Cabinet
- Leader: Prime Minister
- Deputy leader: Robert Kaliňák, Deputy Prime Minister Denisa Saková, Deputy Prime Minister Tomáš Taraba, Deputy Prime Minister Peter Kmec, Deputy Prime Minister
- Appointer: National Council
- Headquarters: Episcopal Summer Palace, Bratislava
- Ministries: 17

Judicial branch
- Supreme Court of the Slovak Republic
- Chief judge: Ján Šikuta
- Seat: Bratislava
- Constitutional Court of Slovakia
- Chief judge: Ivan Fiačan
- Seat: Košice

Politics of Slovakia takes place in a framework of a parliamentary representative democratic republic, with a multi-party system. Legislative power is vested in the parliament and it can be exercised in some cases also by the government or directly by citizens.

Executive power is exercised by the government led by the Prime Minister. The Judiciary is independent of the executive and the legislature. The President is the head of the state. The Economist Intelligence Unit rated Slovakia a "flawed democracy" in 2022. According to the V-Dem Democracy indices Slovakia was in 2023 the 18th most electoral democratic country in the world.

== History ==
Before the Velvet Revolution, Czechoslovakia was a socialist dictatorship ruled by the Communist Party of Czechoslovakia, technically together with the coalition of the so-called National Front. Before the free democratic elections could take place after the revolution, a transitional government was created.

In 1989, President of Czechoslovakia Gustáv Husák was sworn in the Government of National Understanding (Czech: Vláda národního porozumění, Slovak: Vláda národného porozumenia) led by Marián Čalfa with the former being abdicated. It consisted of ten communists and nine non-communists with the aim to prepare for democratic elections, establish market economy in the country, and start preparing a new constitution.

Between 8 and 9 June 1990, the Czechoslovak parliamentary election of 1990 took place. Čalfa's second government disbanded on 27 June 1990 when it was replaced by the Government of National Sacrifice (Czech: Vláda národní oběti, Slovak: Vláda národnej obete), also headed by Marián Čalfa. From 5 until 6 June 1992, the last elections in Czechoslovakia, the Czechoslovak parliamentary election of 1992 took place. Čalfa's third government disbanded on 2 July 1992, when it was replaced by the Caretaker Government of Jan Stráský (Vláda Jana Stráského), headed by Jan Stráský. The caretaker government disbanded on 31 December 1992 together with the Dissolution of Czechoslovakia.

Due to federalism after the Velvet Revolution, two national governments (one for the Czech Republic, one for Slovakia) were created as well under the federal Czechoslovak government. In Slovakia it was headed by Milan Čič and it was established on 12 December 1989 and disbanded on 26 June 1990. Between 8 and 9 June 1990, the 1990 Slovak parliamentary election took place together with the federal Czechoslovak elections. Čič's government was followed by the First Government of Vladimír Mečiar (1990–1991), Government of Ján Čarnogurský (1991–1992) and the Second Government of Vladimír Mečiar (1992–1994).

=== Recent developments ===
In September 2023, populist left-wing Smer-SSD, led by former prime minister Robert Fico, won the general election, taking 79 seats in a 150-seat parliament with its allies, the centre-left Hlas and nationalist SNS parties. The three parties agreed to form a coalition government. On 25 October 2023, Robert Fico became new prime minister of Slovakia, announcing that the new government will stop Slovakia's military aid to Ukraine. At his first EU leaders meeting in Brussels, Prime Minister Robert Fico stated that Slovakia will not support further military aid for Ukraine nor support further sanctions against Russia due to the 2022 Russian invasion of Ukraine.

== Legal system ==
The Constitution of the Slovak Republic was ratified on 1 September 1992 and became effective 1 October the same year (1 January 1993 in some parts). It was amended in September 1998 to allow direct election of the president and again in February 2001 due to EU admission requirements.

The civil law system is based on Austro-Hungarian codes. The legal code was modified to comply with the obligations of Organization on Security and Cooperation in Europe (OSCE) and to expunge the Marxist–Leninist legal theory. Slovakia accepts the compulsory International Court of Justice jurisdiction with reservations.

== Executive branch ==
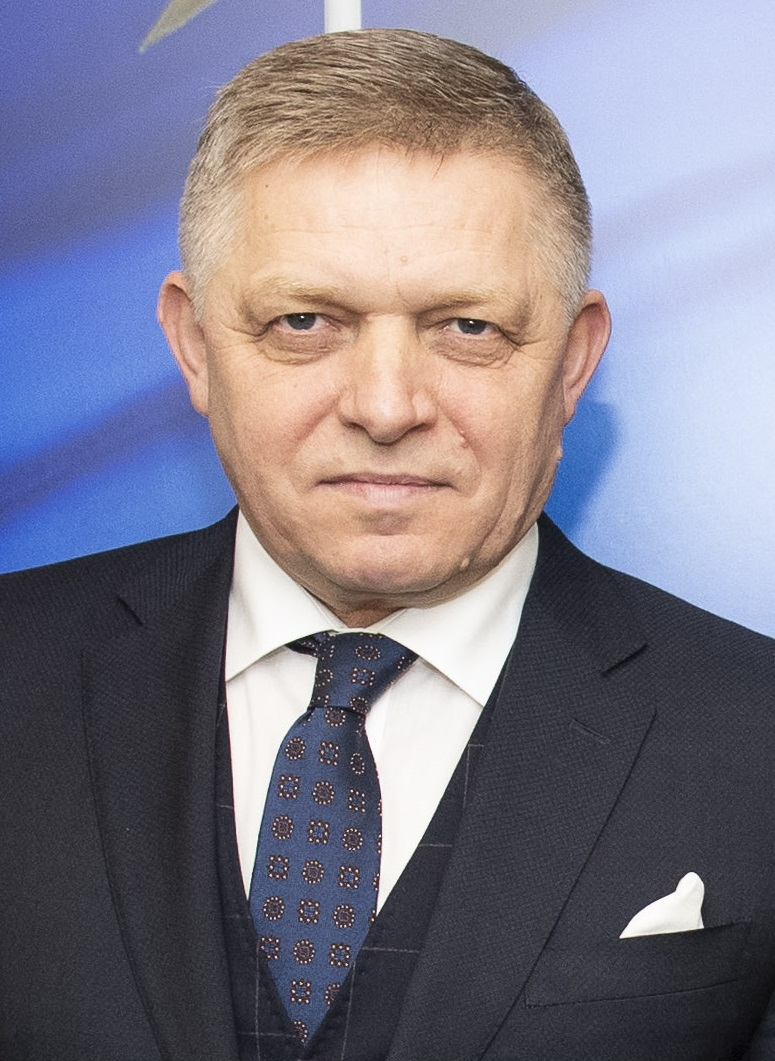
Fico in 2023

Main office-holders
Office	Name	Party	Since
President	Peter Pellegrini	Independent	15 June 2024
Prime Minister	Robert Fico	Smer	25 October 2023

The president is the head of state and the formal head of the executive, though with very limited powers. The president is elected by direct, popular vote, under the two round system, for a five-year term. In March 2019, Zuzana Čaputová was elected as the first female President of Slovakia. She was a member of the liberal Progressive Slovakia party, which did not have seats in parliament.

Following National Council elections, the leader of the majority party or the leader of the majority coalition is usually appointed prime minister by the president. Cabinet appointed by the president on the recommendation of the prime minister has to receive the majority in the parliament. From July 2006 till July 2010 the coalition consisted of Smer, SNS and HZDS. After the 2010 elections, a coalition was formed by the former opposition parties SDKÚ, KDH Most–Híd, and newcomer Freedom and Solidarity. After the major elections from 2012 until 2016, the whole government consisted of members and nominees of the party SMER-SD, which also had majority in the parliament. The 2016 Slovak parliamentary election gave a coalition of parties SMER-SD, SNS, and Most-Híd. After the 2020 Slovak parliamentary election, the Ordinary People and Independent Personalities won the election and Igor Matovič became the Prime Minister. In April 2021, prime minister Eduard Heger was sworn in two days after the resignation of his predecessor Igor Matovič. Heger was a close ally of Matovic and deputy head of his Ordinary People party.

Since 25 October 2023, the prime minister of Slovakia has been Robert Fico. Fico is the longest serving prime minister, if the years are counted cumulatively, with 11 years in total as of 2025.

== Legislative branch ==
Main office-holders
Office	Name	Party	Since
Speaker of the National Council	Richard Raši	Hlas	26 March 2025

Slovakia's sole constitutional and legislative body is the 150-seat unicameral National Council of the Slovak Republic. Delegates are elected for 4-year terms on the basis of proportional representation.

The National Council considers and approves the Constitution, constitutional statutes and other legal acts. It also approves the state budget. It elects some officials specified by law as well as the candidates for the position of a Justice of the Constitutional Court of the Slovak Republic and the Prosecutor General. Prior to their ratification, the parliament should approve all important international treaties. Moreover, it gives consent for dispatching of military forces outside of Slovakia's territory and for the presence of foreign military forces on the territory of the country.

== Political parties and elections ==
=== Suffrage ===
18 years of age; universal, equal, and direct suffrage by secret ballot.

=== Presidential election ===
The president is elected by direct, popular vote, under the two-round system, for a five-year term. Two rounds of the last election occurred on 16 and 30 March 2019.

=== Parliamentary election ===
Members of the National Council of the Slovak Republic (Slovak: Národná rada Slovenskej Republiky), are elected directly for a four-year term, under the proportional representation system. Like the Netherlands, the country is a single multi-member constituency. Voters may indicate their preferences within the semi-open list. The election threshold is 5%.

==== 2023 parliamentary election ====
Results of the election, showing vote strength by commune.

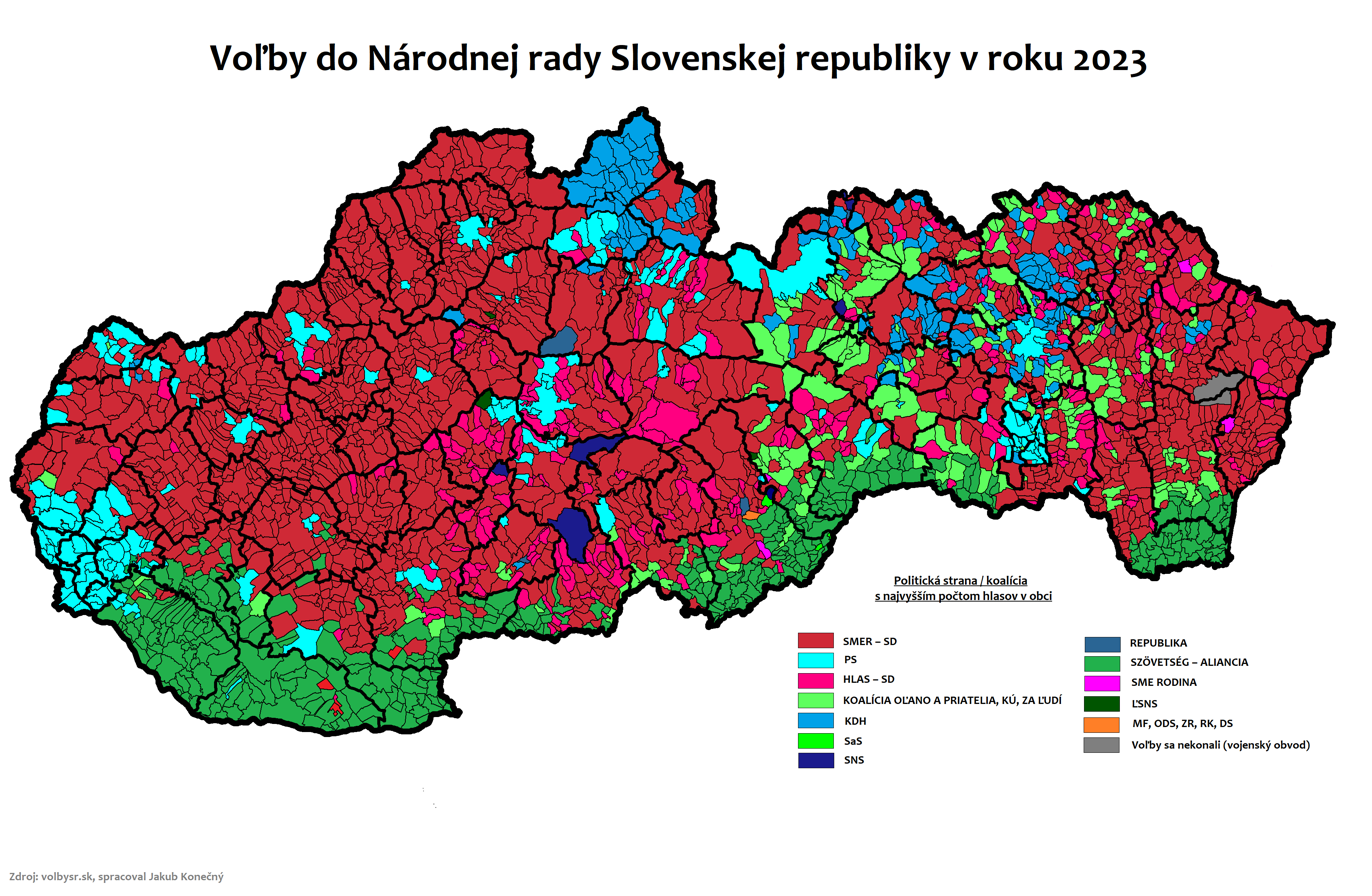
Results of parliamentary elections at the municipal level

Party	Votes	%	Seats	+/–
Direction – Social Democracy	681,017	22.95	42	+4
Progressive Slovakia	533,136	17.96	32	+32
Voice – Social Democracy	436,415	14.70	27	New
OĽaNO and Friends	264,137	8.90	16	–48
Christian Democratic Movement	202,515	6.82	12	+12
Freedom and Solidarity	187,645	6.32	11	–2
Slovak National Party	166,995	5.63	10	+10
Republic	141,099	4.75	0	New
Alliance	130,183	4.39	0	0
Democrats	87,006	2.93	0	0
We Are Family	65,673	2.21	0	–17
People's Party Our Slovakia	25,003	0.84	0	–17
Communist Party of Slovakia	9,867	0.33	0	New
Pirate Party – Slovakia	9,358	0.32	0	New
Modrí, Most–Híd	7,935	0.27	0	New
Hungarian Forum	3,486	0.12	0	New
MySlovensko	2,786	0.09	0	New
Karma	2,407	0.08	0	New
Together Citizens of Slovakia	2,401	0.08	0	New
HEART Patriots and Pensioners – Slovak National Unity	2,315	0.08	0	New
Princíp	1,817	0.06	0	New
Spravodlivosť	1,335	0.04	0	0
Slovak Revival Movement	1,332	0.04	0	0
Patriotic Bloc	1,262	0.04	0	New
Slovak Democratic and Christian Union – Democratic Party	771	0.03	0	New
Total	2,967,896	100.00	150	0
Valid votes	2,967,896	98.83		
Invalid/blank votes	35,052	1.17		
Total votes	3,002,948	100.00		
Registered voters/turnout	4,388,872	68.42		
Source: Results

=== Results by parties ===
Group	Party	Seats	+/–
Direction – Social Democracy		42	+4
Progressive Slovakia		32	+32
Voice – Social Democracy		27	+27
Slovakia–Christian Union–For the People	Slovakia	12	–33
Slovakia–Christian Union–For the People	Christian Union	2	–2
Slovakia–Christian Union–For the People	For the People	1	–11
Slovakia–Christian Union–For the People	NOVA	1	–1
Freedom and Solidarity	Freedom and Solidarity	10	–2
Freedom and Solidarity	Civic Conservative Party	1	0
Christian Democratic Movement		12	+12
Slovak National Party	National Coalition	3	+3
Slovak National Party	Life – National Party	3	0
Slovak National Party	Slovak National Party	1	+1
Slovak National Party	Independents	3	+3

=== Results by region ===
Region	Smer–SD	PS	Hlas–SD	OĽaNO and Friends	KDH	SaS	SNS	Republic	Alliance	Democrats	We Are Family	People's Party Our Slovakia	KSS	Other parties
Bratislava Region	18.54	31.00	10.36	6.17	4.90	12.50	4.31	3.14	0.91	4.43	1.78	0.57	0.20	1.08
Trnava Region	22.01	17.07	12.11	9.40	4.56	5.36	4.43	4.38	12.69	2.92	2.19	0.81	0.40	1.56
Trenčín Region	29.47	16.63	16.40	5.93	5.44	5.63	7.28	5.45	0.03	2.84	2.22	1.06	0.46	1.03
Nitra Region	25.31	14.42	14.40	7.47	4.06	4.80	4.51	4.46	13.91	2.19	2.01	0.80	0.26	1.24
Žilina Region	25.79	15.51	16.04	6.90	9.38	5.56	8.11	5.61	0.02	2.80	2.02	0.96	0.34	0.89
Banská Bystrica Region	22.89	14.96	19.76	7.41	4.29	5.14	6.53	5.18	5.17	2.40	2.73	1.33	0.43	1.67
Prešov Region	22.04	10.83	16.16	14.78	14.07	4.10	5.73	5.22	0.07	2.65	2.36	0.63	0.31	0.98
Košice Region	21.10	14.68	15.08	13.46	6.80	5.74	4.38	4.97	5.44	2.98	2.75	0.76	0.33	1.41
Foreign	6.10	61.70	2.46	3.81	3.31	10.80	3.79	3.20	0.47	2.50	0.55	0.38	0.04	0.76
Total	22.94	17.96	14.70	8.89	6.82	6.32	5.62	4.75	4.38	2.93	2.21	0.84	0.33	1.16

Smer

PS

Hlas

OĽANO

KDH

SaS

SNS

Republika

Szövetség–Aliancia

Demokrati

Sme rodina

Turnout

==== Other election results ====
- EU parliament, see 2024 European Parliament election in Slovakia
- Older elections, see Elections in Slovakia

=== Political parties ===
Political party system map of Slovakia, 1990–2026

== Political party system change over time ==
Since the reintroduction of elections in 1990, Slovakia's political party system has experienced significant changes, including many splits and mergers and the ongoing emergence of new political parties. Relatively few of the parties in Slovakia's trace their origins back to the 1990s (the Christian Democratic Movement and the Slovak National Party). Others were formed in the 2000s (Smer-Social Democracy (Smer-SD) and Freedom and Solidarity), in the 2010s (Ordinary People (now Slovensko) and Progressive Slovakia) and in the 2020s (Hlas-SD and Republika). Although the main dimension of political conflict in Slovakia in the 1990s concerned questions of national identity and democracy and the dominant position of HZDS, the left-right cleavage over economic reforms increased in importance in the 2000s (principally between Smer-SD and the Slovak Democratic and Christian Union – Democratic Party).

In the 2010s and 2020s, Smer-SD has remained a dominant power, but Progressive Slovakia has become its main opponent, and the political dimension of competition has expanded to include an intense focus on corruption along with culture war issues such as gender and sexuality, and foreign policy issues such as support for Russia and Ukraine. The main political issues in Slovakia were job opportunities, access to health care, youth emigration, waste of public funds and political polarization according to a 2025 poll.

Some parties have regional and ethnic strongholds. For example, the Party of the Hungarian Coalition (MKP-SMK) and later the Hungarian Alliance (MS-MA) receive support mainly from the Hungarian minority in southern Slovakia.

== Judicial branch ==
The country's highest appellate forum is the Supreme Court (Najvyšší súd), the judges of which are elected by the National Council; below that are regional, district, and military courts. In certain cases the law provides for decisions of tribunals of judges to be attended by lay judges from the citizenry. Slovakia also has the Constitutional Court of Slovakia (Ústavný súd Slovenskej Republiky), which rules on constitutional issues. The 13 members of this court are appointed by the president from a slate of candidates nominated by Parliament.

Parliament passed legislation which created a 18-member Judicial Council in 2002 consisting of judges, law professors, and other legal experts, is responsible for the nomination of judges. All judges except those of the Constitutional Court are appointed by the president from a list proposed by the Judicial Council. The council also is responsible for appointing Disciplinary Senates in cases of judicial misconduct.

== International organization participation ==
Slovakia is member of ACCT (observer), Australia Group, BIS, BSEC (observer), CE, CEI, CERN, European Audiovisual Observatory, EAPC, EBRD, EIB, EU, FAO, IAEA, IBRD, ICAO, ICC, ICCt, ICRM, IDA, IEA, IFC, IFRCS, ILO, IMF, IMO, Interpol, IOC, IOM, ISO, ITU, ITUC, MIGA, NAM (guest), NATO, NEA, NSG, OAS (observer), OECD, OPCW, OSCE, PCA, UN, UNAMSIL, UNCTAD, UNDOF, UNESCO, UNFICYP, UNIDO, UNTSO, UPU, Visegrád Group, WCO, WEU (associate partner), WFTU, WHO, WIPO, WMO, WToO, WTO, ZC

== Political pressure groups and leaders ==
- Federation of Employers' Associations of the Slovak Republic (Slovak: Asociácia zamestnávateľských zväzov a združení) (AZZZ) (President: Rastislav Machunka)
- Association of Employers of Slovakia (AZS)
- Association of Towns and Villages of Slovakia (Slovak: Združenie miest a obcí Slovenska) (ZMOS) (Chairman: Jozef Dvonč) – pressure group consisting of almost all Slovak towns.
- Confederation of Trade Unions of the Slovak Republic (Slovak: Konfederácia odborových zväzov) (KOZ) (President: Miroslav Gazdík)
- Club 500 (Slovak: Klub 500) (Chairman: Vladimír Soták) – union of Slovak companies employing more than 500 employees.
- Metal Workers Unions (Slovak: Odborový zväz KOVO) (KOVO) (Chairman: Emil Machyna) – merged with OZ METALURG on 1. January 2010.
- Republic Union of Employers (Slovak: Republiková únia zamestnávateľov) (RÚZ) (President: Marián Jusko)
- Slovak Academy of Sciences (Slovak: Slovenská akadémia vied) (SAV) (Chairman: Jaromír Pastorek) – the highest scientific institution in Slovakia.
- Slovak Merchant and Industrial Chamber (Slovak: Slovenská obchodná a priemyselná komora) (SOPK)
- Union of Slovak Pensioners (Slovak: Jednota dôchodcov Slovenska) (Chairman: Kamil Vajnorský)
- Slovenská živnostenská komora (Chairman: Vojtech Gottschall) (SŽK) – created by Law No. 126/1998 Z. z. from 12. December 1998.
- Slovenský živnostenský zväz (Chairman: Čižmárik Stanislav) (SŽZ)
- General Bishop's Office (Slovak: Generálny biskupský úrad) (Director: Dušan Vagaský)

== See also ==
- List of political parties in Slovakia
- List of Slovak politicians
- Slovak political scandals
- Privatization in Slovakia
