= Pavol Hrivnák =

Slovak politician and prime minister (1931–1995)

Prime Minister of the Slovak Socialist Republic
- In office 22 June 1989 – 8 December 1989
- President: Gustáv Husák
- Preceded by: Ivan Knotek
- Succeeded by: Milan Čič

Personal details
- Born: 9 October 1931 Malý Čepčín, Czechoslovakia
- Died: 3 February 1995 (aged 63) Bratislava, Slovakia
- Party: Slovak Communist Party; Communist Party of Czechoslovakia

Pavol Hrivnák (9 October 1931 – 3 February 1995) was a Slovak politician who served as prime minister of the Slovak Socialist Republic from June to December 1989.

== Biography ==
Hrivnák was born in Malý Čepčín on 9 October 1931. He was a member of the Slovak Communist Party and the Communist Party of Czechoslovakia. He was named member of the Slovak Communist Party Politburo in May 1971 and became Politburo member of the Czech Communist Party in December 1986.

On 12 October 1988, he was named first deputy minister in the federal government led by Ladislav Adamec. Hrivnák was appointed Prime Minister of Slovakia on 22 June 1989, replacing Ivan Knotek in the post, but his tenure lasted very brief and on 8 December 1989, Hrivnák and his cabinet resigned. The chairmanship of the Slovak National Council (SNR) accepted the resignation. Then Milan Čič was asked to form a new cabinet.

Hrivnák died on 3 February 1995 in Bratislava and was buried in the National Cemetery.

== See also ==
- List of prime ministers of the Slovak Socialist Republic

Political offices
Preceded by Ivan Knotek	Prime Minister of the Slovak Socialist Republic; 1989	Succeeded by Milan Čič
