= Vlkas =

Vlkas Valkház
- Municipality
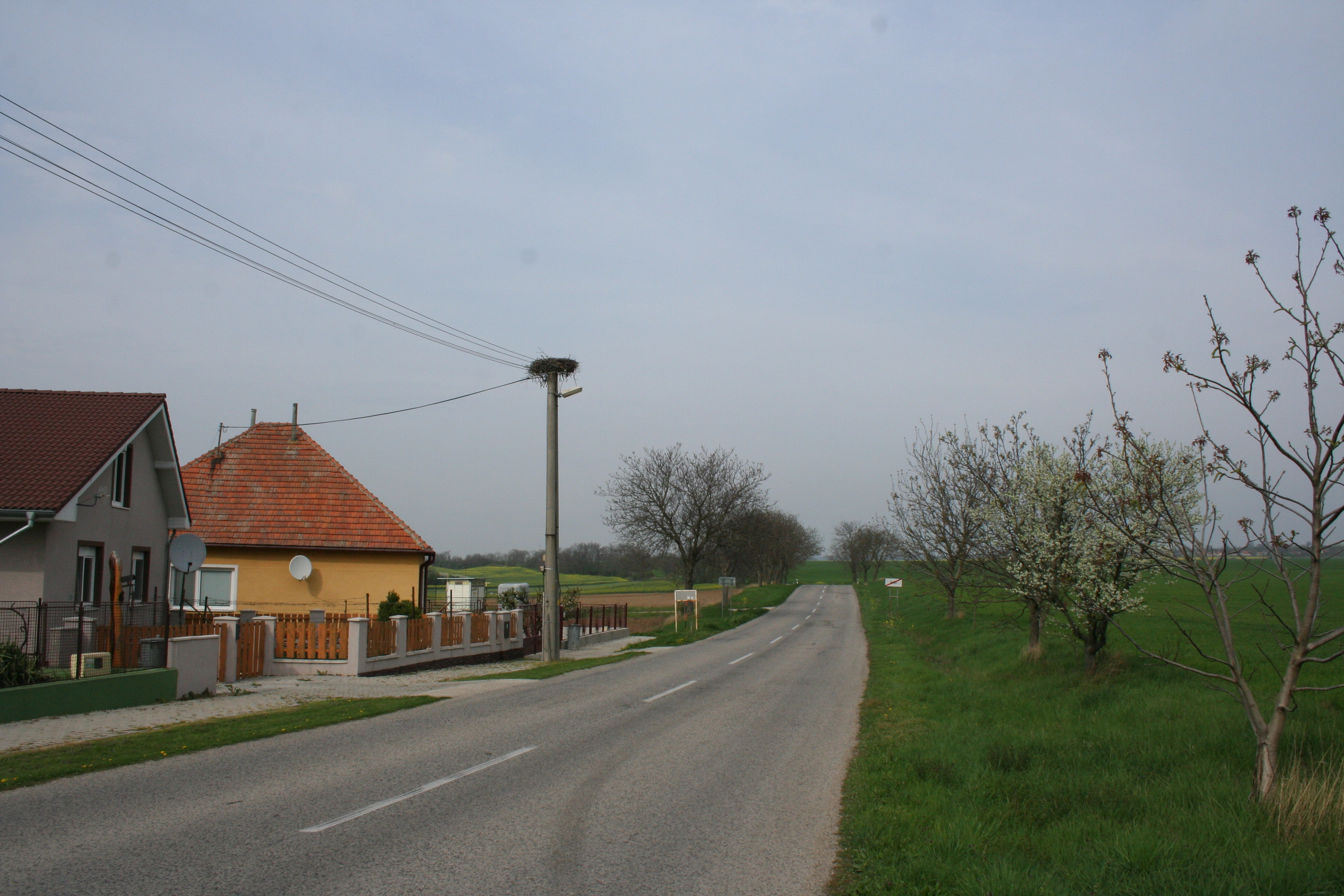

- Flag

- Location of Vlkas in the Nitra Region Location of Vlkas in Slovakia
- Coordinates: 48.12°N 18.28°E
- Country: Slovakia
- Region: Nitra Region
- District: Nové Zámky District
- First mentioned: 1231

Area
  - Total: 6.69 km^{2} (2.58 sq mi)
- Elevation: 133 m (436 ft)

Population (2025)
  - Total: 304
- Time zone: UTC+1 (CET)
  - Summer (DST): UTC+2 (CEST)
- Postal code: 941 44
- Area code: +421 35
- Vehicle registration plate (until 2022): NZ
- Website: www.obecvlkas.sk

Vlkas (Hungarian: Valkház) is a village and municipality in the Nové Zámky District in the Nitra Region of south-west Slovakia.

== History ==
In historical records the village was first mentioned in 1231.

== Geography ==
The municipality lies at an altitude of 133 metres (436 ft) and covers an area of 6.69 km^{2} (2.58 sq mi) (2025).

== Population ==
Population statistic (10 years)
Year	1995	2005	2015	2025
Count	367	308	328	304
Difference		−16.07%	+6.49%	−7.31%

Population statistic
Year	2024	2025
Count	303	304
Difference		+0.33%

It has a population of 304 people (31 December 2025).

=== Ethnicity ===
Census 2021 (1+ %)
Ethnicity	Number	Fraction
Slovak	310	98.1%
Not found out	8	2.53%
Hungarian	4	1.26%
Total	316	

In year 2021 was 316 people by ethnicity 310 as Slovak, 8 as Not found out, 4 as Hungarian and 1 as Czech.

Note on population: The difference values of population numbers in the table "Population statistic" and in the sections "Ethnicity" & "Religion" is caused by the use of various statistical methods.

=== Religion ===
Census 2021 (1+ %)
Religion	Number	Fraction
Roman Catholic Church	277	87.66%
None	25	7.91%
Calvinist Church	5	1.58%
Total	316	

In year 2021 was 316 people by religion 277 from Roman Catholic Church, 25 from None, 5 from Calvinist Church, 3 from Christian Congregations in Slovakia, 2 from Not found out, 2 from Evangelical Church, 1 from Other and not ascertained christian church and 1 from Greek Catholic Church.

== Facilities ==
The village has a small public library a gym and football pitch.

== Notable people ==
Notable people that were born or lived in Vlkas include the following:

- Štefan Sádovský (1928–1984), politician
