= Katarínka =

Church in Little Carpathians, Slovakia

Coordinates: 48°33′18″N 17°32′08″E

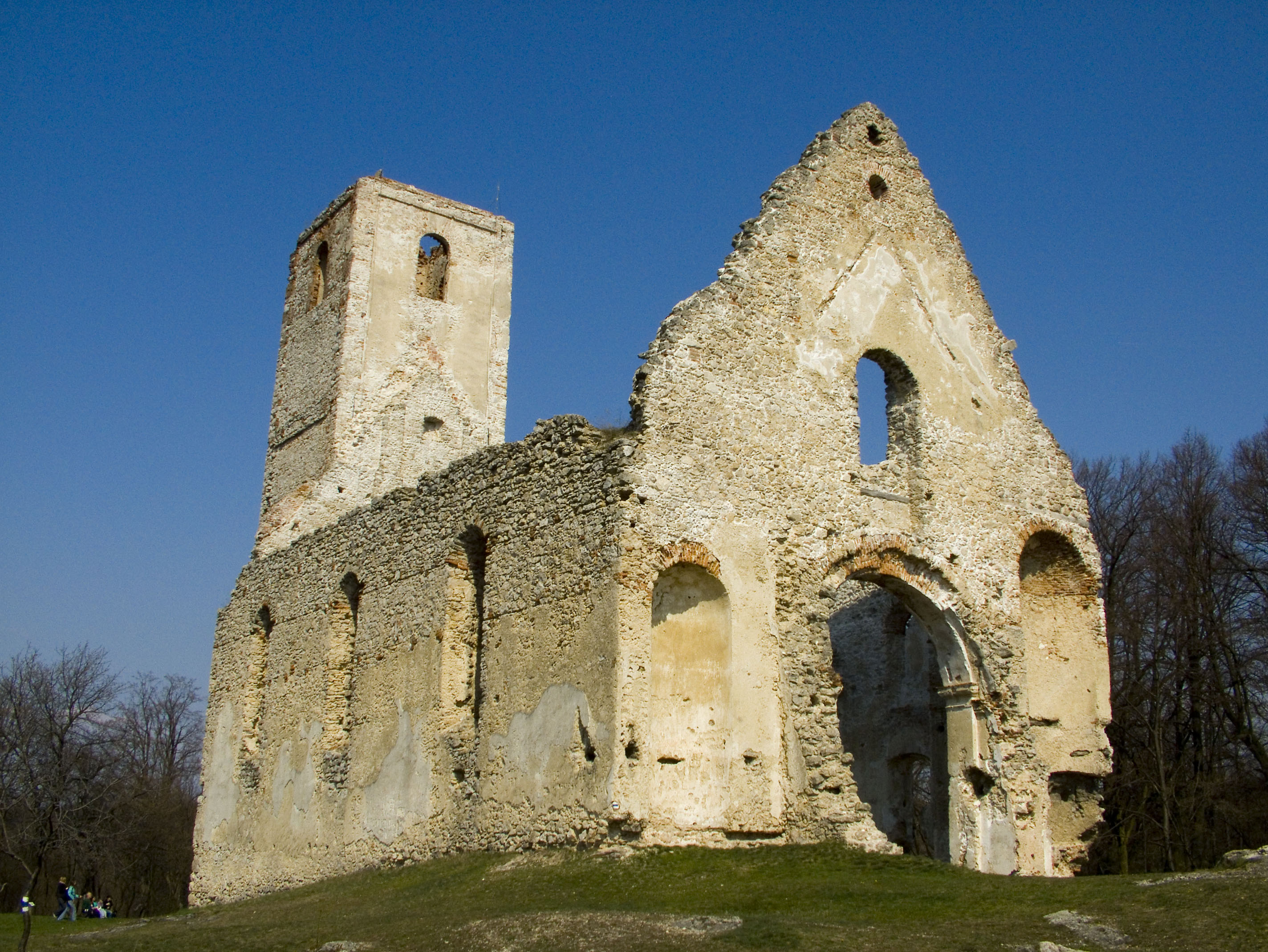
- Katarínka
- Country: Slovakia

Architecture
- Completed: 17th century

Katarínka (German: St. Katharein, Hungarian: Szent Katalin kolostor) are the ruins of a Franciscan monastery and church dating back to the early 17th century, located deep in the forests of the Little Carpathians (Malé Karpaty) in western Slovakia, 20 km north of Trnava over Dubovský creek, close to the villages of Dechtice, Naháč and Dobrá Voda. The church was dedicated to Saint Catherine of Alexandria, and that is where the nickname of the place Katarínka comes from.

== Saving of Katarínka ==
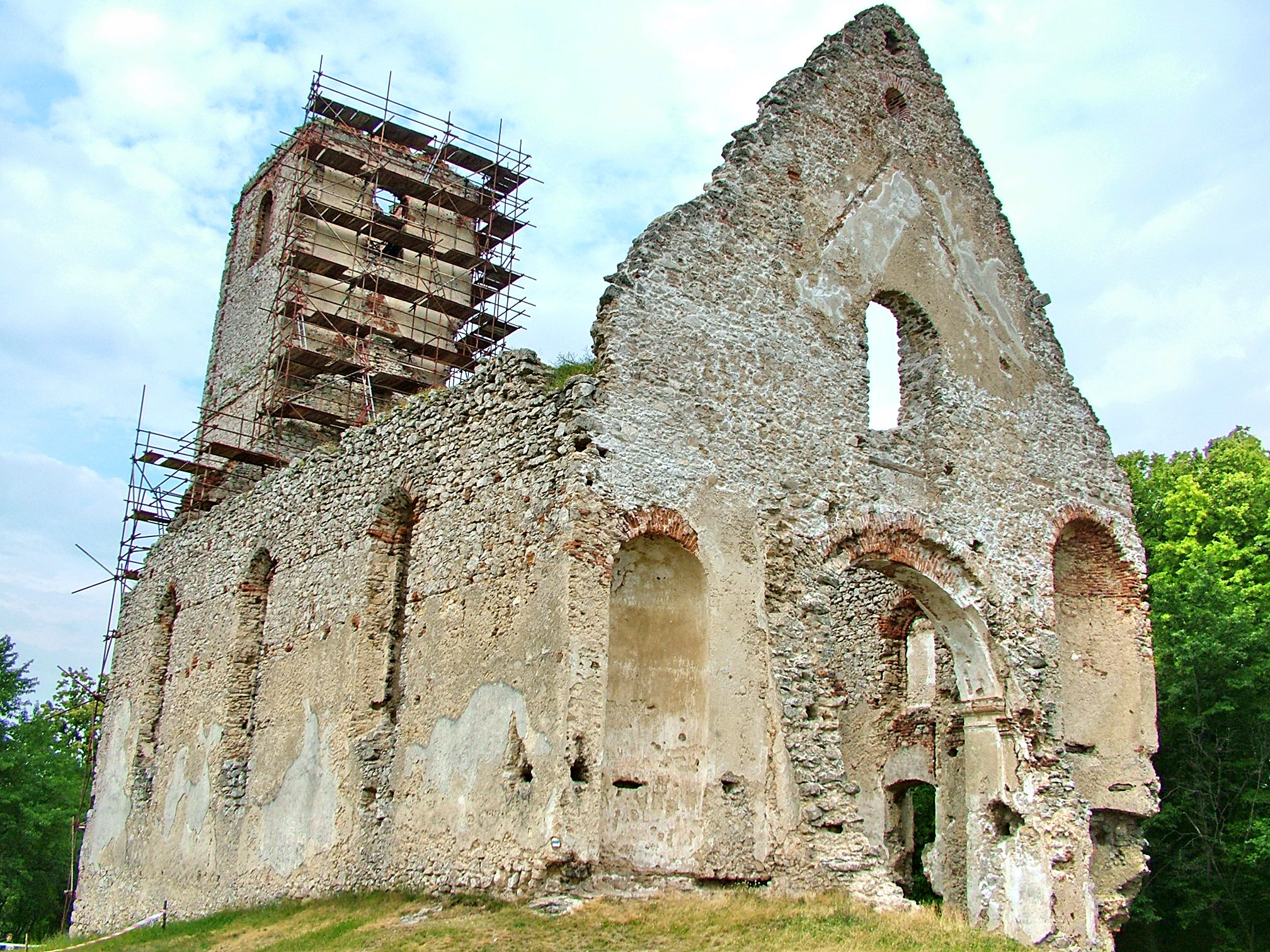
Beginning of summer works at church tower preservation in 2005.

The project Katarínka (Little Catherine) was initiated to prevent the neglected monastery from further decay and destruction. It is intended for young volunteers and has a form of two-week summer camps held in medieval spirit. Volunteers are working on the reconstruction and conservation of ruins. The complex archaeological, historical and geophysical research takes place in the monastery.

== Narrow gauge forest railway of the Little Carpathians ==
Monastery of Saint Catherine neighbors the exposition dedicated to narrow gauge forest railway of the Little Carpathians (1898-1960), whose line Smolenice – Dobrá Voda led nearby the monastery. Exposition includes also a short yard with ancient vehicles and ample informational panels. The yard will be gradually extended and will enable the view of the connection with its former line.

== Location ==
Ruins of Catherine's church and monastery are situated in the central part of the Little Carpathians in the Nature reserve of Katarínka about 3 kilometers west from the village Dechtice. Ruins are accessible by the trail from the village Naháč marked by blue signs about 2 km north. The trail continues up to the ruins of the castle Dobrá Voda.

=== Access ===
From the border of the Protected Landscape Area of the Little Carpathians (CHKO Malé Karpaty) the access is possible only by walking or cycling.

- The trail from the village of Naháč to Katarínka is marked using blue signs with estimated hiking time 0:40.
- The trail from the village of Dechtice to Katarínka marked using yellow signs, estimated hiking time 1:20. It is possible to get to the border of the forest by car. The sign „No motor vehicles“ is placed there.
- The trail from the village of Dobrá Voda marked using blue signs, estimated hiking time 1:20.

== History of St. Catherine's Monastery ==
- First third of 15th century – Gothic chapel made of stone on the site in the woods of Little Carpathian Mountains on a rocky hill above Dubovský creek
- Late 1500s – supposed apparitions of St. Catherine to a shepherd, who built here a small chapel into a cave
- 1617 – recorded apparition of St. Catherine to a ploughman Ján Manca, inhabitant of Dechtice. Noble young man Ján Apponyi, the son of a rich count from Jablonica, had come to live here as a hermit in the cave. When his noble family got angry and forced him to return home, he died of sorrow the next day. He is said to be hallowed.
- 1618 – 21 December – count Krištof Erdödy, the domain owner, issued the foundation document establishing a Franciscan monastery on this site
- 1619 – the new monastery had first twelve inhabitants
- 1645 – St. Catherine's monastery was plundered and set on fire during an armed rebellion of the Hungarian nobility (Juraj Rákóczi I.)
- 1646 – reconstruction and rebuilding of the site led by the founder's son Gabriel Erdödi with his wife Judita Amade. The church was substantially rebuilt to incorporate the original small one from 1618 as the chancel of the new one.
- Around 1650 – Chordigers – members of layman Franciscan Order – started their caring for the sick and the poor here. Emperor Joseph II abolished this fellowship in 1782.
- 1663 – monastery was attacked first by the Turks, later on by emperor's army. The soldiers killed noblemen who were seeking refuge from persecution at St Catherine's
- 1683 – another raid carried out on the monastery by the troops of Imre Thököly
- 1697 – at the pilgrimage attended by a huge number of people – some soldiers tried to recruit young boys into the army with the use of violence. The crowd of pilgrims pushed the soldiers in the church and one soldier was lynched in this accident.
- 1701 – 9 January – the church tainted by murder was consecrated again. Juraj and Krištof II. Erdödi issued a deed of gift of 500 ducats for the church's maintenance
- 1710 – 9 September – during a cholera epidemic very famous Franciscan friar Benignus Smrtník (1650–1710) died. He was the author of various religious books in Slovak, e.g. Kunšt dobre umríti (The Art of a Good Death).
- In 18th century – numerous donors – mainly nobility but villagers as well – gave large gifts to the monastery. Families of noble origin built their crypts on this site (e.g. Erdődy, Apponyi, Labšanskí)
- 1782 – Juraj Fándly, the parish priest in Naháč, complained about his parishioners. Most of them preferred St. Catherine's church to the parish one. More to be read in his well-known book Dúwerná zmlúva mezi mníchom a diáblom, 1789.
- 1786 – 22 July – Emperor Joseph II's decree abolished St. Catherine's monastery as "useless", together with 738 monasteries in the empire, which did not take care of the poor or educate the youth.
- 1787 – 22 January – monastery was transferred to state control. Valuable equipment and inventory were step by step moved to surrounding churches and monasteries, many of these were spontaneously stolen or lost forever...
- 1788–1792 - seven disabled former soldiers from Trnava lived in and looked after the deserted monastery
- 1793 – church crypts were plundered by three thieves
- 1797 – neglected objects of the former monastery were bought by Jozef Erdödi, as a tribute to his ancestors buried in the crypts. However, gradually the objects went to ruins.
- 1811 – calvary statuary, originally from St. Catherine's monastery, was brought by Erdödi family to Dechtice, the nearby village.
- 1835 – the last official mention of "guardian of St. Catherine" – that time it was Jozef Kollár from Dechtice.
- 1869, 1891 – first historical publications dealing with St. Catherine's monastery appeared: authors such as Balázsovits or Jedlicska.
- 1905 – four above-standard sandstone sculptures of Franciscans, situated on the top corners of St. Catherine's church tower were moved to Pálffy's burial crypt in Smolenice churchyard.
- 1995 – 3 July – picturesque ruins came to life again thanks to youth's activity and their "Katarínka Order – the preservationists"

== Current events ==
- 1996 – conservation of the ruins has started
- 1997 – 2000 – archaeological research, conservation of foundations of Baroque chapel near the church
- 2000 – foundation and conservation of monastery's entrance
- 2000 – 2001 – foundation and exploration of the crypt in the nave
- 2003 – 2005 – foundations and exploration of the Gothic chapel in the chancel – archaeological research
- 2004 – conservation of the front gable (22m high), its windows and inserting handmade oak timbers, foundation of remains of the main Baroque altar with the sculptures of St. Catherine, St. Thecla and the angel's torso in the chancel
- 2005 – church's tower (30m high) was conserved and deep breach in its corner was statically secured because urgent collapse of tower threatened
- 2006 – 2009 – complete conservation of all church walls including reconstruction of pillars and window holes
- 2010 – after the winter the part of the monastery wall collapsed. In summer the vault of the church wall containing stucco decorations was reconstructed, complete re-masoning and conservation of the tower crown took place, carpentry work at the tower was done – preparing handmade timbers for fixing tower floors and constructing of a handmade windlass which remains historical lifting equipment for dragging heavy loads into the tower
- 2011 – conservation of north-facing tower wall facade, reconstruction of the fifth (upper) floor at the height of 25 meters whose construction is made of 6 handmade oak timbers (cross-section approximately 23 × 23 cm) and seventh timber under them (25 × 25 cm).
- 2012 – re-masoning of southeastern presbytery corner and masonry works at southeastern church corner whose structural damage threatened, conservation of the east-facing church gable
- 2013 – reconstruction of the tower and its floors for the purpose of view from the tower top continues, part of the monastery was conserved, reconstruction of a vault, grassing of walls (putting a layer of loam and plants on the top of the walls)
- 2014 – conservation of the west presbytery wall, masonry works at the crown of the tower, grassing of three tower sides, grouting, tops of two pillars in the church nave has been statistically secured, conservatory works on the monastery – west and southwest facing wall

== See also ==
- Catherine of Alexandria
- Dubova Colonorum - sister-project of Katarínka
