= Dechtice =

- Municipality
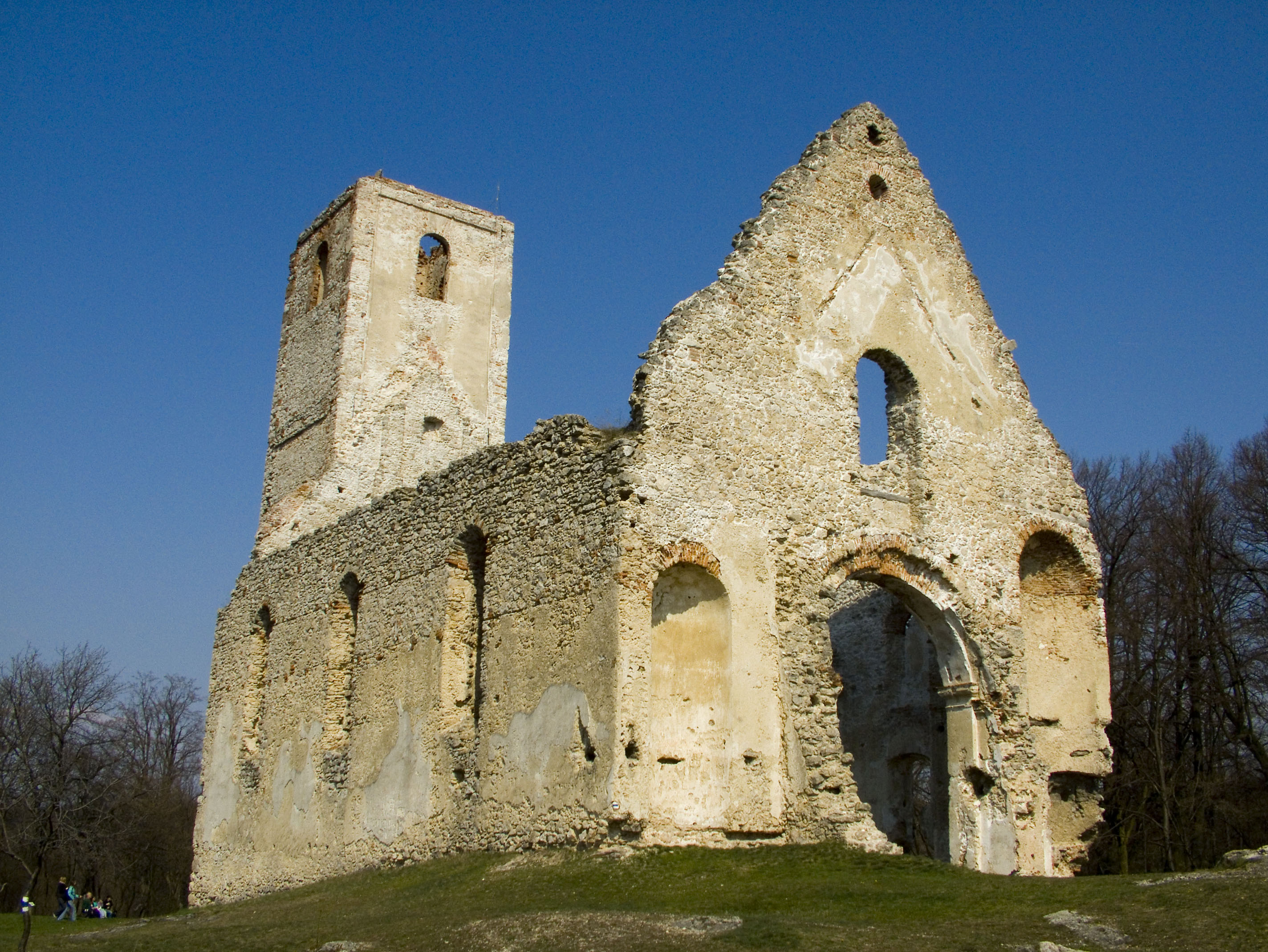
- Katarínka, the ruins of a Franciscan monastery and church near Dechtice

- Flag

- Location of Dechtice in the Trnava Region Location of Dechtice in Slovakia
- Coordinates: 48.55°N 17.60°E
- Country: Slovakia
- Region: Trnava Region
- District: Trnava District
- First mentioned: 1258

Area
  - Total: 19.46 km^{2} (7.51 sq mi)
- Elevation: 182 m (597 ft)

Population (2025)
  - Total: 1,707
- Time zone: UTC+1 (CET)
  - Summer (DST): UTC+2 (CEST)
- Postal code: 919 53
- Area code: +421 33
- Vehicle registration plate (until 2022): TT
- Website: www.dechtice.sk

Dechtice is a municipality of Trnava District in the Trnava region of Slovakia.

== Genealogical resources ==
The records for genealogical research are available at the state archive "Statny Archiv in Bratislava, Slovakia":

- Roman Catholic church records (births/marriages/deaths): 1657-1900 (parish A)
- Lutheran church records (births/marriages/deaths): 1666-1895 (parish B)

== Places of interest ==
- Katarínka
- Rotunda of All Saints

== Geography ==
The municipality lies at an altitude of 182 metres (597 ft) and covers an area of 19.46 km^{2} (7.51 sq mi) (2025).

== Population ==
Population statistic (10 years)
| Year | 1995 | 2005 | 2015 | 2025 |
|---|---|---|---|---|
| Count | 1757 | 1808 | 1857 | 1707 |
| Difference | | +2.90% | +2.71% | −8.07% |

Population statistic
| Year | 2024 | 2025 |
|---|---|---|
| Count | 1721 | 1707 |
| Difference | | −0.81% |

It has a population of 1707 people (31 December 2025).

=== Ethnicity ===
Census 2021 (1+ %)
| Ethnicity | Number | Fraction |
|---|---|---|
| Slovak | 1760 | 98.32% |
| Not found out | 21 | 1.17% |
| Total | 1790 | |

In year 2021 was 1790 people by ethnicity 1760 as Slovak, 21 as Not found out, 7 as Czech, 4 as Hungarian, 4 as Other, 2 as Rusyn, 1 as Italian, 1 as Russian and 1 as Croatian.

Note on population: The difference values of population numbers in the table "Population statistic" and in the sections "Ethnicity" & "Religion" is caused by the use of various statistical methods.

=== Religion ===
Census 2021 (1+ %)
| Religion | Number | Fraction |
|---|---|---|
| Roman Catholic Church | 1500 | 83.8% |
| None | 222 | 12.4% |
| Not found out | 20 | 1.12% |
| Total | 1790 | |

In year 2021 was 1790 people by religion 1500 from Roman Catholic Church, 222 from None, 20 from Not found out, 16 from Evangelical Church, 15 from Christian Congregations in Slovakia, 4 from Other and not ascertained christian church, 4 from Ad hoc movements, 3 from Greek Catholic Church, 2 from Apostolic Church, 1 from Eastern Orthodox Church, 1 from Paganism and natural spirituality, 1 from Other and 1 from Buddhism.

== See also ==
- List of municipalities and towns in Slovakia
