= Jozef Heriban =

Slovak screenwriter (1953)

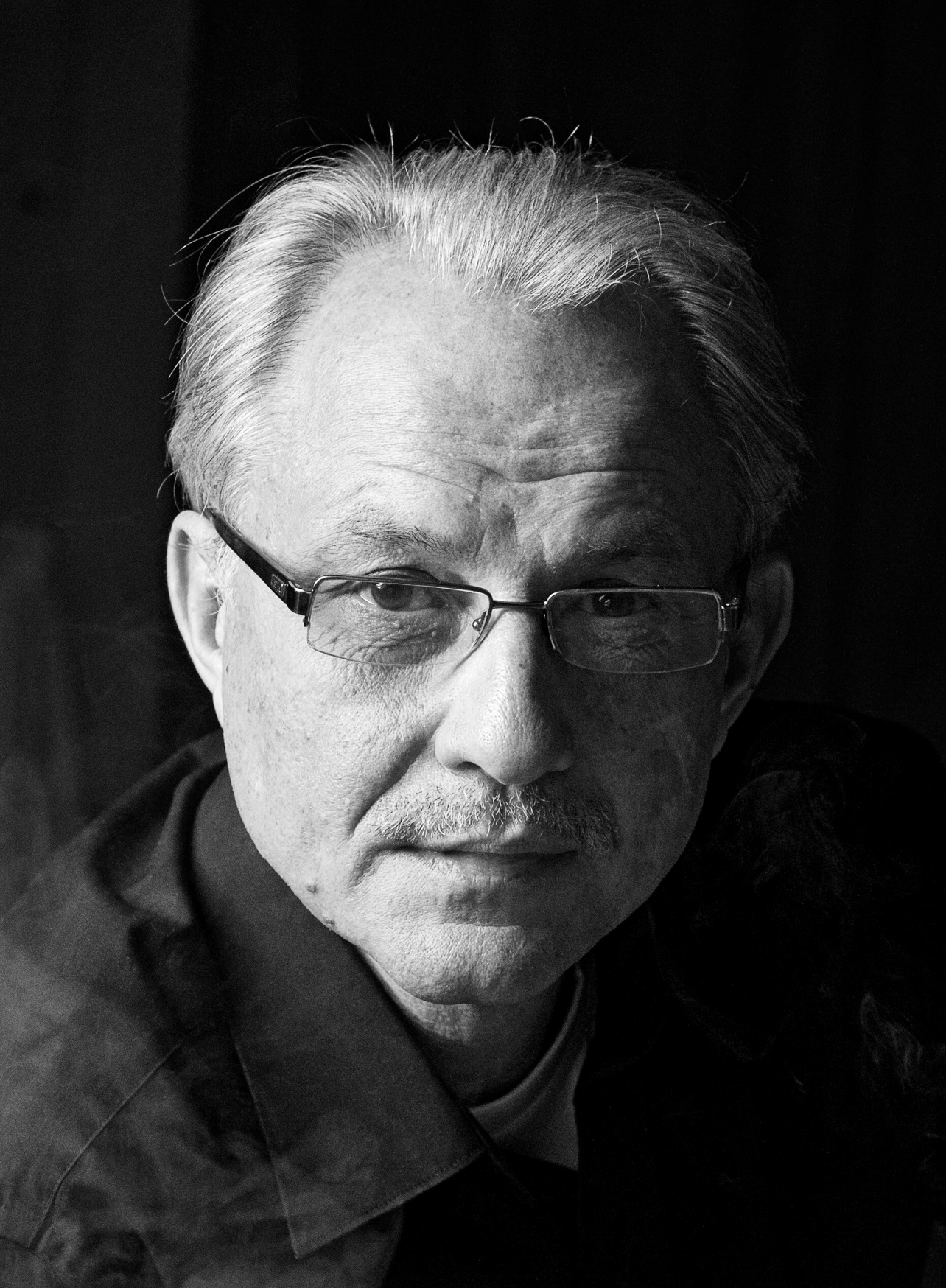
- Heriban in 2012
- Born: 9 July 1953 (age 73); Trnava, Czechoslovakia
- Education: Comenius University in Bratislava
- Occupation: Slovak writer, film director
- Organization: Slovak PEN Centre
- Spouse: Alena Heribanová
- Partner: Vanda Tureková
- Children: Tamara Heribanová, Barbara Heribanová

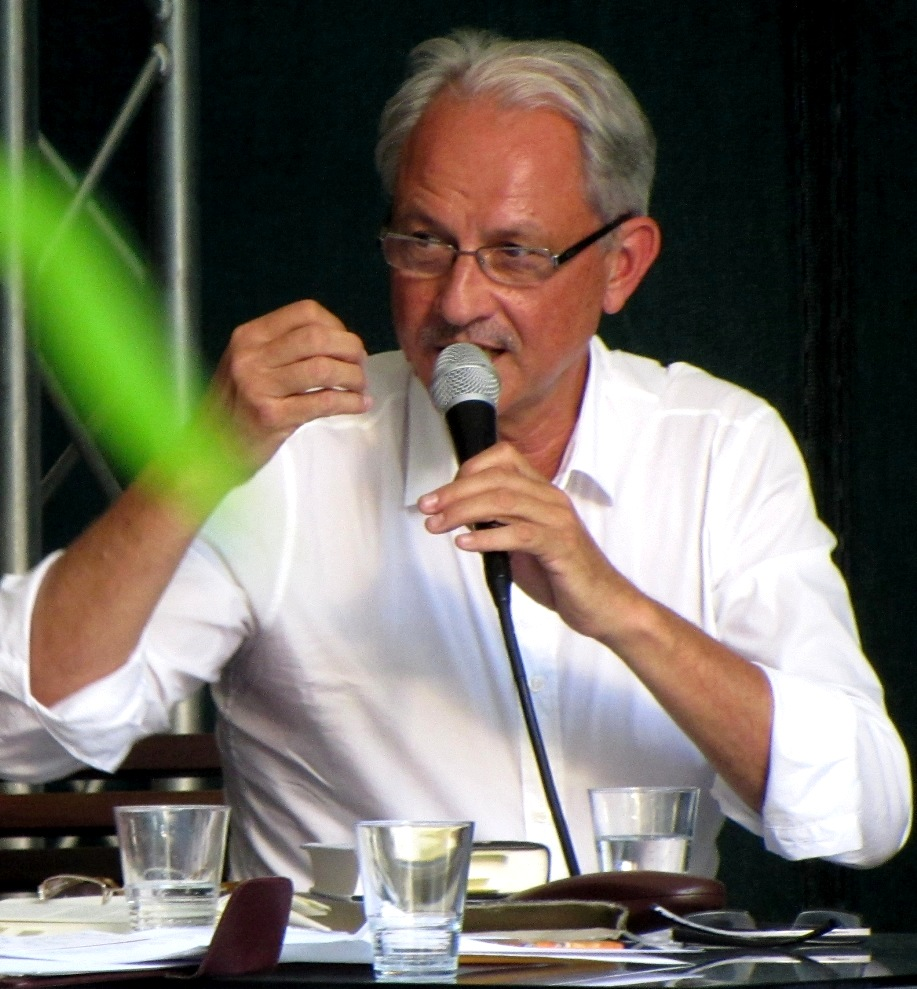
Jozef Heriban – čítačka Červený rak

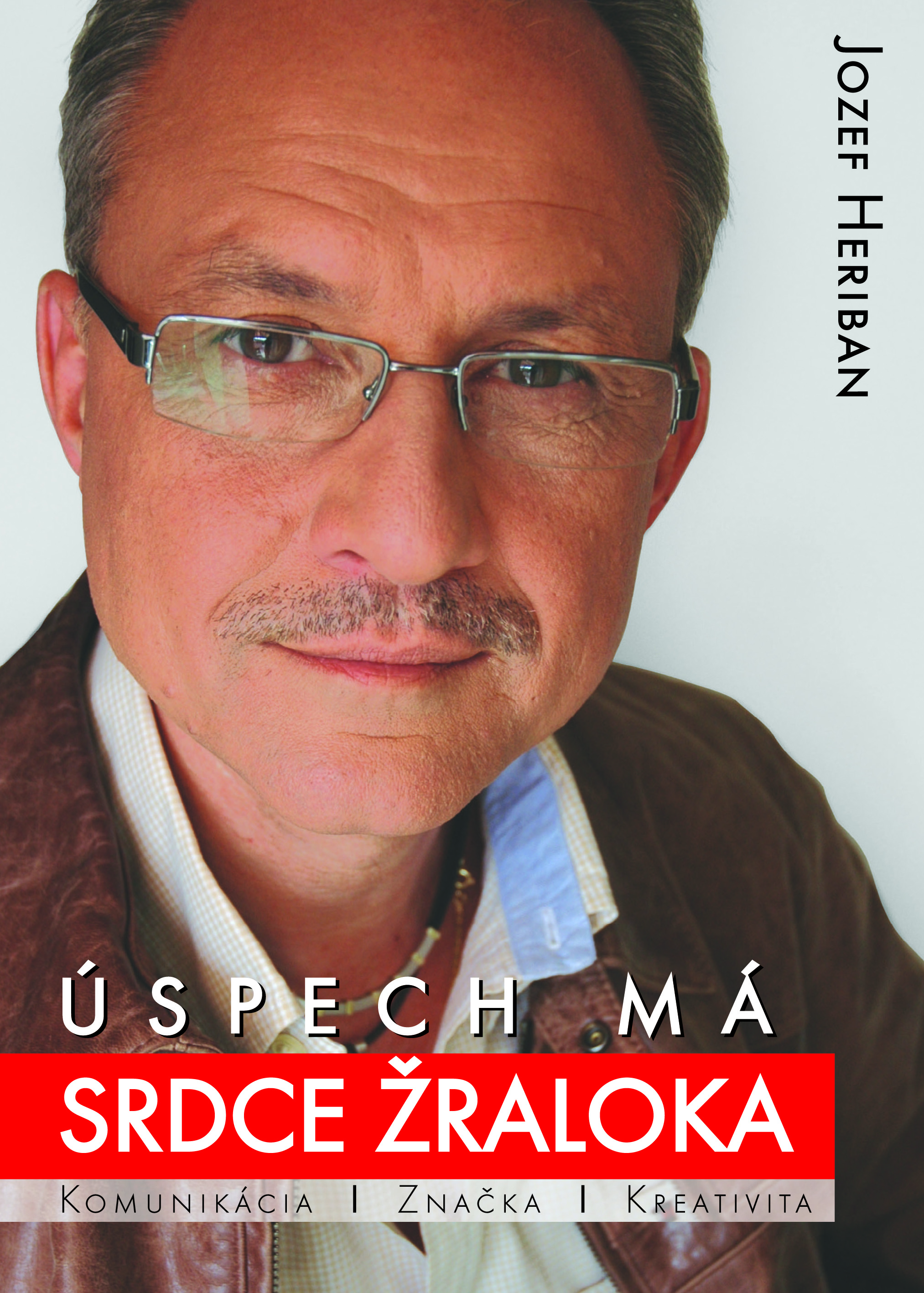
Jozef Heriban: Úspech má srdce žraloka

Jozef Heriban (born 9 July 1953) is a Slovak writer, scenarist and film director. He devotes his time to literature and film. He is the former President of the Slovak PEN Centre, a Vice-President of the Board of the Slovak Audiovisual Fund and a member of the Slovak Film and Television Academy. He was married to well-known television talk show host and former Director of the Slovak Institute in Vienna Alena Heribanová and has two daughters, writer and journalist Tamara Šimončíková Heribanová and marketing and PR manager Barbara Jagušák. The couple divorced in 2017 after 39 years of marriage. Since 2018, he has been in a relationship with Slovak actress Vanda Tureková.

== Life ==
Jozef Heriban was born in 1953 in Trnava, Slovakia. He studied accordion and trombone at the Conservatory in Bratislava, aesthetics and slovak literature at Comenius University in Bratislava, where he was conferred the title of Doctor Philosophy PhDr.(1985). He acted for eleven years in the Slovak film studio as a scriptwriter, film director, script editor and as Head producer for feature films (1981 – 1992). He has cooperated with the best Slovak film directors: Dušan Hanák, Juraj Jakubisko, Dušan Trančík, Juraj Herz, Dušan Rapoš, Stanislav Párnický, Martin Tapák and others. In 1994 he founded the production company TATRA STAR, Ltd. with Jozef Slovák and Pavol Jursa. From 1994-1996 the company produced the comedy TV series Bud Bindi. The show was made up of stories of two eternal rivals - a likeable prankster and a successful born loser, warning their way of every impossible situation - were a great success with the viewers in Slovakia as well as abroad. The particular parts gained prizes at International film and TV festivals and were sold into 25 states of the world.

In 1996 Heriban began work in TV Markiza as a head of public relations. He was responsible for marketing and PR strategy, coordination of interviews, press releases and branding. Later he was the Director of Public Relations in EuroTel Bratislava (1998 - 1999) and in 1999 he came back to TV Markiza as the Director of Advertising. Between 2002 and 2006 he was a member of the Slovak National Council and an observer and a deputy of the European Parliament. After 2007 he has worked a Director of Marketing in International Film Festival Bratislava. At present, he is the Vicepresident of the Slovak PEN Centre, member of the Slovak Film and Television Academy, lecturer at the Faculty of Management of Comenius University in Bratislava and he devotes his time to literature.

== Film work ==
Together with Jozef Slovák he wrote the script for the exceptionally popular comedy Run, He is coming! (Utekajme, už ide!), which won the "Zlatý Prim" prize for the best film at the 9th Film Festival in Nové Mesto nad Metují (1987) and the script for the film Southern Post (Južná pošta), which won the Czechoslovak Film Prize at the 26th Film festival of Czechoslovak films in Brno (1988).

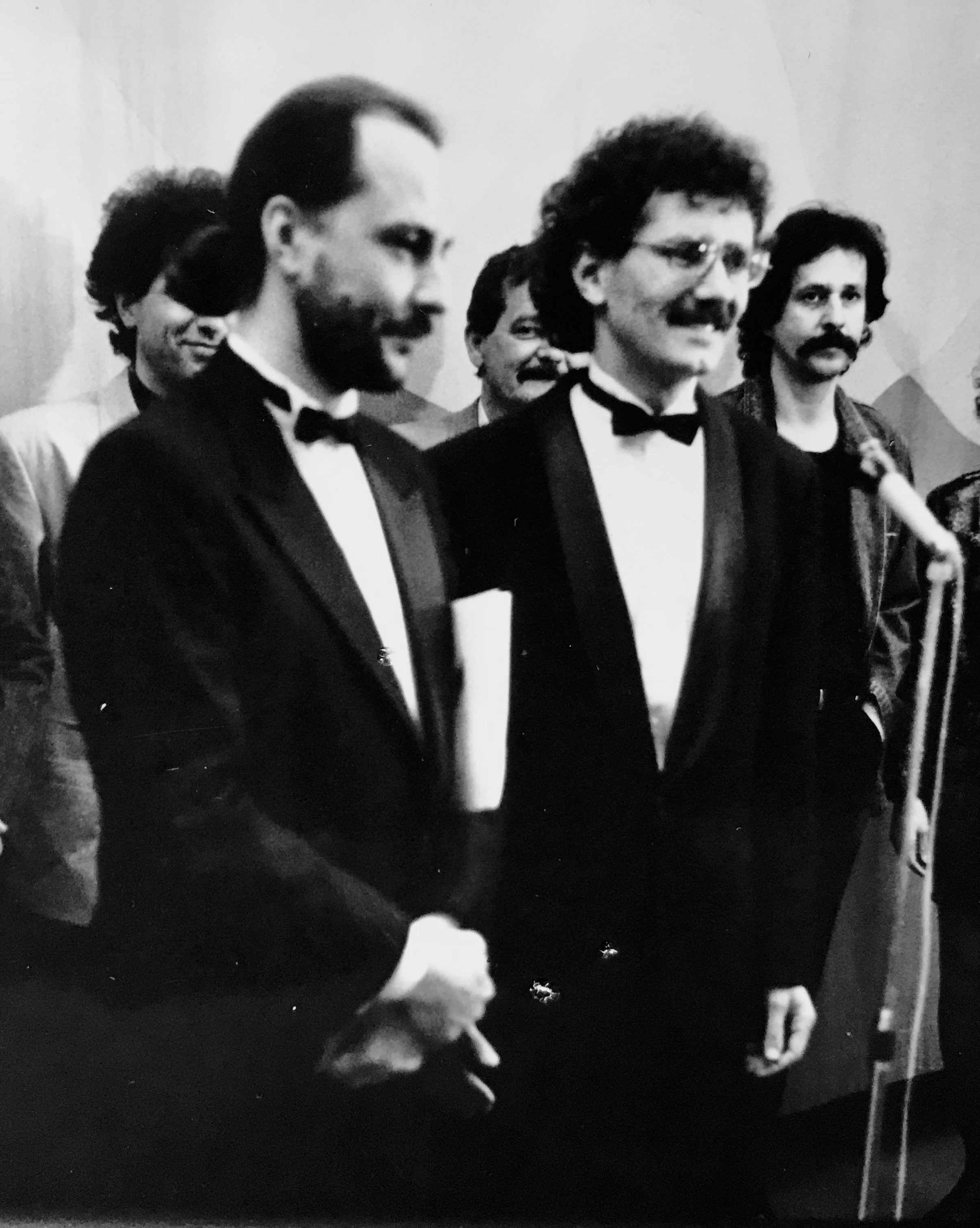
Jozef Heriban, Jozef Slovák_Island of the Long Ears_film premiere 1990

With Jozef Slovák he also wrote and directed the tragicomedy Island of Long Ears (Dávajte si pozor), which was awarded the Prize for the Best First Film at the 15th International Film Festival in Cairo (1991), a Gold Award at the 25th IFF in Houston (1992) and a Silver Award at the 16th IFF in Philadelphia (1993).

In cooperation with Jozef Slovák and Pavol Jursa he wrote, directed and produced the Bud Bindi, television comedy series, which won numerous awards at International Film Festivals, including a Gold Award at the 28th IFF in Houston (1995) and a Silver Spire at the 39th IFF in San Francisco (1996).

== Dramatic work ==
Heriban has written six radio dramas (Da capo al Fine, Diagnosis 300, Voices for Maria, HAN 82, Life for 55 minutes, Chess), which were awarded prizes in competitions for original texts and at festivals of radio dramas. They have been presented in Germany, Italy, Poland, Switzerland, Austria and the Czech Republic.

== Literary fiction ==
His novel Somebody is Always Whistling at Me (Niekto na mňa stále píska) was published in 1996. It had won First Prize in the Literary Fund's anonymous competition (1993). In 2007 he wrote and published a book about communication, brand and creativity, Success Has a Heart of the Shark (Úspech má srdce žraloka), which was voted for the Book of the Year 2007“.

The novel Intimacy of Wolves (Intimita vlkov 2008) and Obsession (Posadnutost 2009) became the bestsellers immediately after publishing. The theme of human intimacy is central in the novels The Pink Triangle (2010) and Come out, come out, wherever you are (2011). Both books underline the author´s distinctive sense of humour, provocative sexuality and dynamic narration.

Literary theorist Alexander Halvoník writes in a study of the book Flew Over the Flying Birds (2013): "I think that something like author program actually exists. Author wears it in yourself and it does not hang anyone on the nose, but despite the fact that because of their complexity difficult to implement, insists on it even if, say, does not write any book."

The highlights of Heriban's prose works are The Bassoonist, Who Was Not Loved by God (2014) and Garage Libertango (2023). The novella The Bassoonist, Who Was Not Loved by God is an emotional confession of the unfortunate second bassoonist in Philharmonic orchestra, Samuel Gold Baťovansky. The author uses his typical gentle humor in the touching story.

In the novel Garage Libertango, which he began writing in Buenos Aires, inspired by Argentine tango lessons at the renowned International school of Professor Rodolfo Dinzel, Heriban returns to 2015. At that time, hundreds of thousands of modern-day nomads appeared at railway stations in Europe. The story depicts in a tragicomic style the dramatic fate of the Afghan Hosseini family, which is trying to realize its dream of freedom and a harmonious life. In a parallel line, the novel captures the community of Argentine tango dancers and their desire to find the embrace of a loved one in a crumbling world.

== Gallery ==
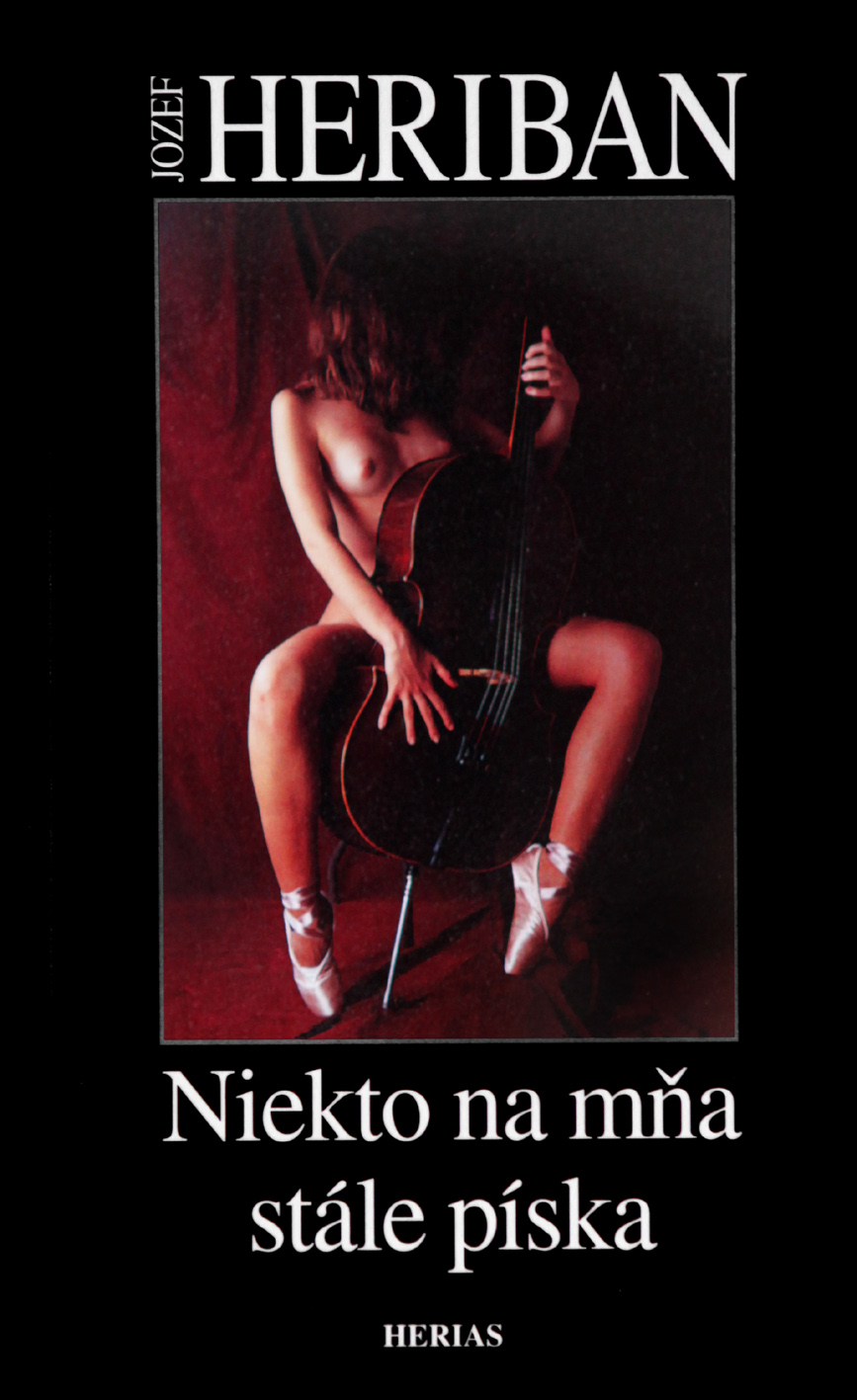
Jozef Heriban: Niekto na mňa stále píska

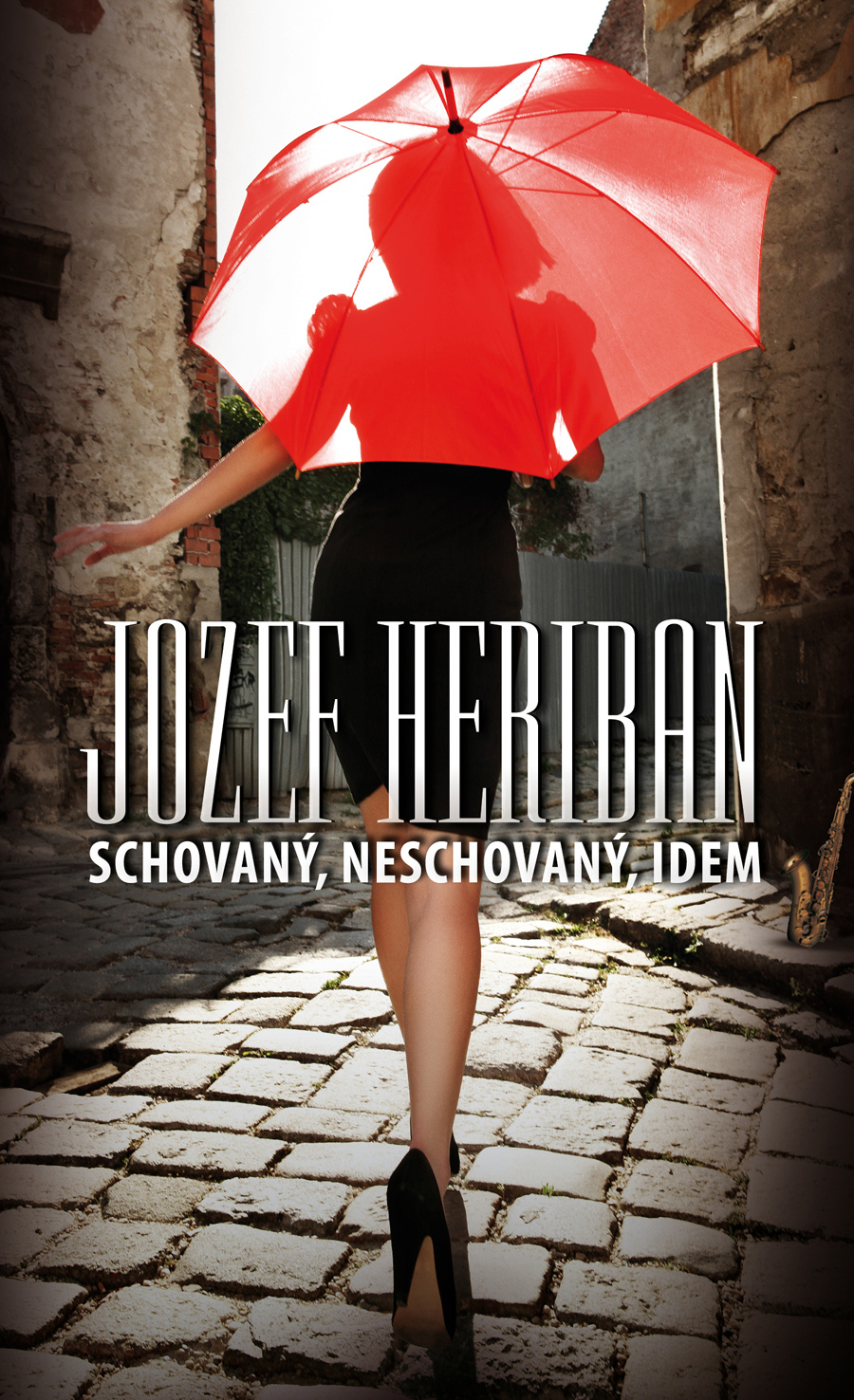
Jozef Heriban: Schovaný, neschovaný, idem

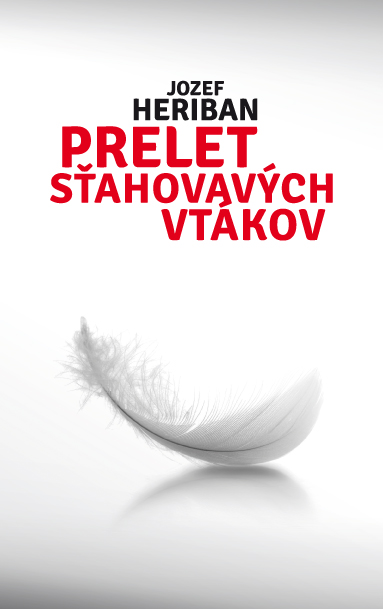
Jozef Heriban: Prelet sťahovavých vtákov

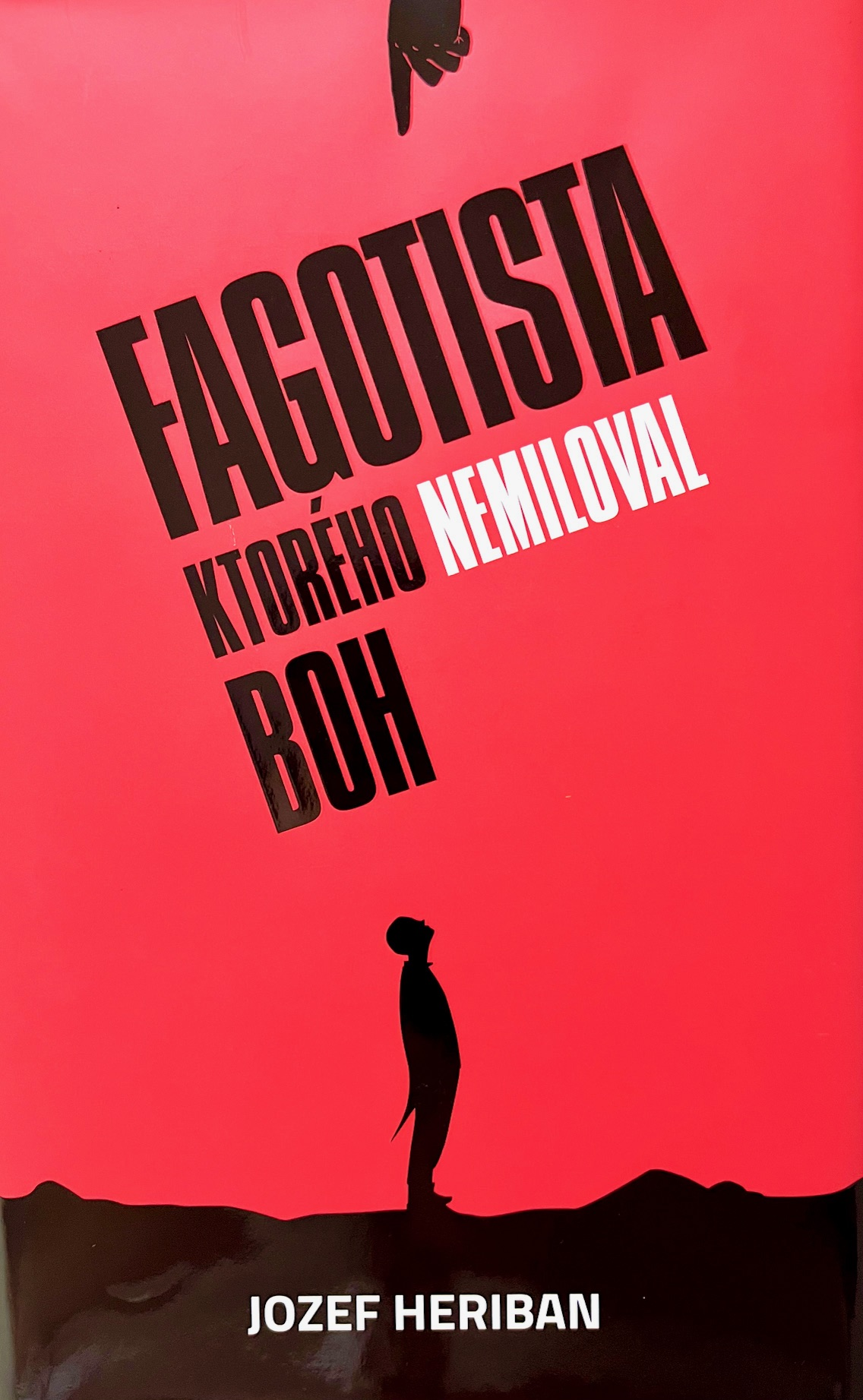
The bassoonist, Who Was Not Loved by God was written by Jozef Heriban

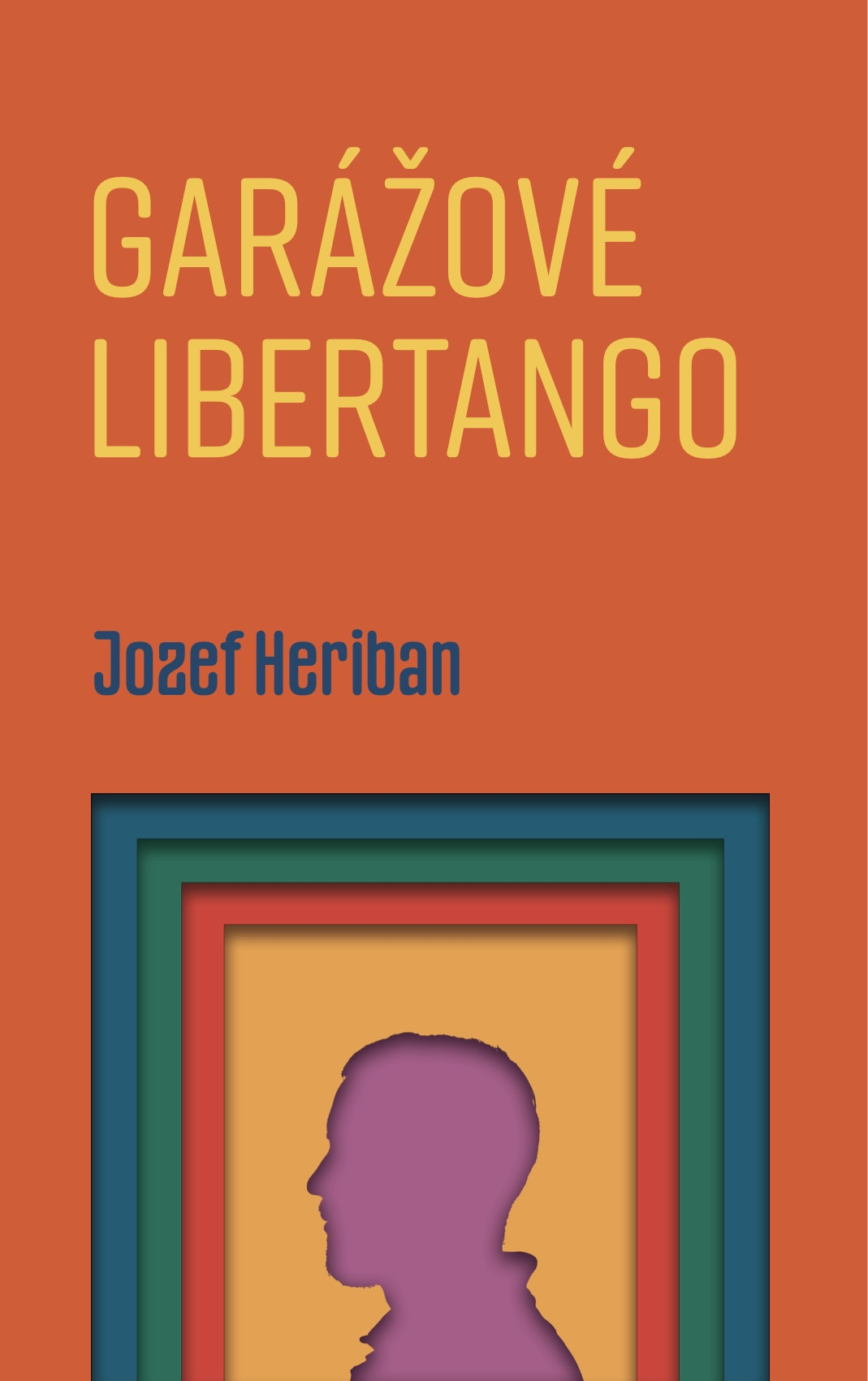
Novel the Garage Libertango was written by Jozef Heriban

== Filmography ==
For full filmography check

- Utekajme, už ide! (feature film 1986) Run, He is coming! - "Zlatý Prim" prize for the best film at the 9th Film Festival in Nové Mesto nad Metují (1987)
- Južná pošta (feature film 1987) Southern Post - Czechoslovak Film Prize at the 26th Film festival of Czechoslovak films in Brno (1988)
- Dávajte si pozor! (feature film 1991) Island of Long Ears - Prize for the Best First Film at the 15th International Film Festival in Cairo (1991), a Gold Award at the 25th IFF in Houston (1992) and a Silver Award at the 16th IFF in Philadelphia (1993)
- Bud Bindi (television comedy series 1993-1996) - Honorary Mention in the Golden Gate Awards Competition at the 37th IFF in San Francisco (1994), Bronze Award at the 27th IFF in Houston (1994), Gold Award at the 28th IFF in Houston (1995) and a Silver Spire at the 39th IFF in San Francisco (1996)

== Novels ==
- Niekto na mňa stále píska, Herial, Bratislava, 1996; Somebody is Always Whistling at Me, ISBN 80-967397-0-0, 1996 Awarded by Literary Fund's - First Prize in the anonymous competition (1993)
- Intimita vlkov, Herial, Bratislava, 2008; Intimacy of Wolves, ISBN 978-80-969969-0-2, 2008
- Posadnutosť, Herial, Bratislava, 2009; Obsession, ISBN 978-80-969969-2-6, 2009
- Ružový trojuholník, Herial, Bratislava, 2010; Pink Triangle, ISBN 978-80-969969-4-0, 2010
- Schovaný, neschovaný, idem, Herial, Bratislava, 2011; Come out, come out, wherever you are, ISBN 978-80-969969-6-4, 2011
- Prelet sťahovavých vtákov, Herial, Bratislava, 2013; Flew Over the Flying Birds, ISBN 978-80-969969-7-1 Awarded by Main Prize of the Slovak PEN Centre
- Fagotista, ktorého nemiloval Boh, Herial, Bratislava, 2014; The Bassoonist, Who Was Not Loved by God, ISBN 978-80-969969-8-8
- Garážové Libertango, Slovart, Bratislava, 2023; Garage Libertango, ISBN 978-80-556-6381-4

== Radio dramas ==
- Da capo al Fine (1979) - Prize in the Radio author competition HRDM (1979), Prize ZSDU at the 7th Radio festival in Piešťany (1981)
- Diagnóza 300, Diagnosis 300 (1980) - Prize in the Radio author competition HRDM (1980)
- Hlasy pre Máriu, Voices for Maria (1982) - First Award in Drama competition VRŽ (1983)
- HAN 82 (1982) - Prize for Directing at the 8th Radio festival in Piešťany (1983)
- Život na 55 minút, Life for 55 minutes (1988) - Prize in the Radio author competition HRDM (1988)
- Šach, Chess (1990) - Prize for the Best stereo drama at the 12th Radio festival in Piešťany (1991)

== Marketing books ==
- Úspech má srdce žraloka, Herial, Bratislava, 2007; Success Has a Heart of the Shark, ISBN 8096966561, 2007 "Book of the Year 2007"
