= Rotunda of All Saints, Dechtice =

Rontunda in Dechtice, Slovakia

- Rotunda Všetkých svätých v Dechtice
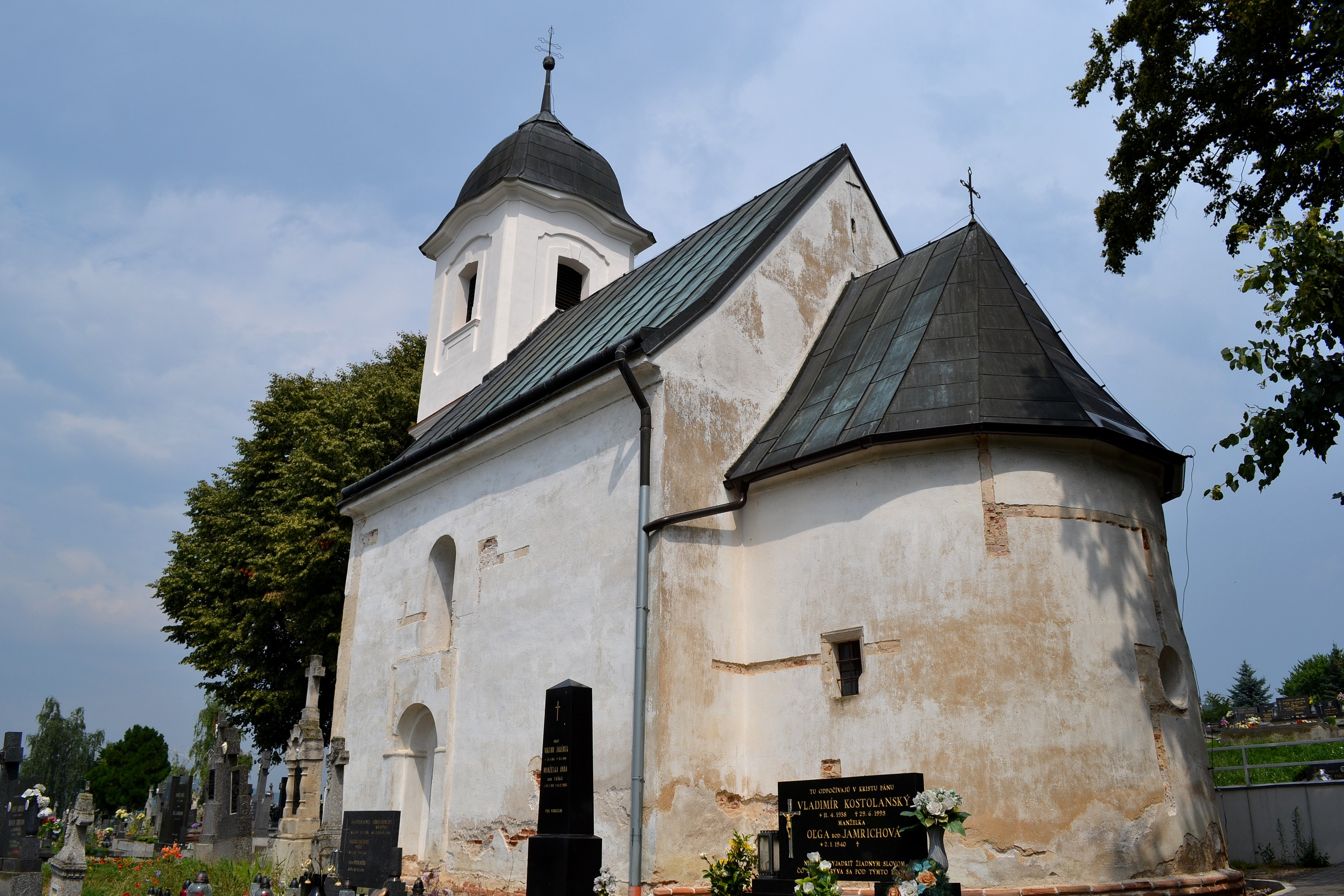
- Rotunda of All Saints, Dechtice
- 48.551389°N 17.595°E
- Location: Dechtice, Trnava Region, Slovakia

Architecture
- Architectural type: Romanesque and Baroque
- Completed: 1172

The Rotunda of All Saints (Slovak: Rotunda Všetkých svätých v Dechtice) also referred to as a church, is a rotunda building in the village of Dechtice in the Trnava District of the Trnava Region in Slovakia.

The church is owned by the village of Dechtice. It was first mentioned in 1172. The building has also been entered into the list of historic architecture in Slovakia. The church is most known for its preserved paintings between the first half of the 13th century and the last quarter of the 14th century. According to conservationists, the bricks that were used for the church came from Italy.

== History ==
The church, also known as Horný in the village, was built in 1172. It is evident from documents from the canonical visitation in 1782. Originally, the building was built as a single-nave space on a slightly flattened circular ground plan. On the eastern side, it was finished with a semicircular apse. The nave was vaulted with a dome.

In the following periods, the church was stylistically modified. Minor structural modifications occurred in the late Gothic period, but substantial changes occurred in the first half of the 18th century, when a low Baroque tower topped with a helm was added to the western facade (in 1741). This gave the church its current appearance. The building also received a new portal in the tower, which meant that the original entrance from the south side was no longer used. The church was seriously damaged by Russian troops during the liberation of the village in 1945 during World War II, when part of the church tower was blown off. In 2016, the church was renovated for approximately 370,000 euros.

== Description ==
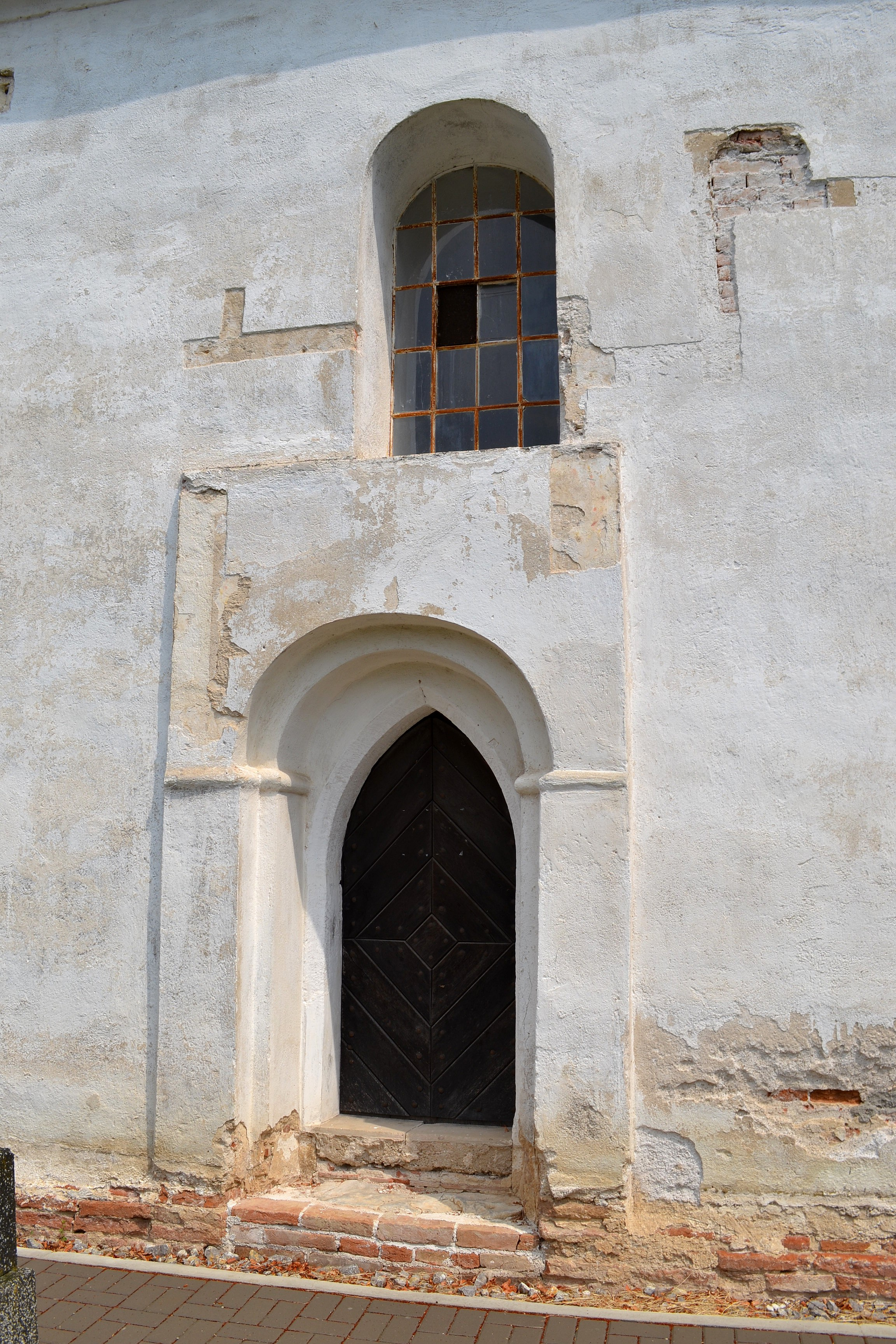
The windows of unequal shape, are located on all levels.

The All Saints' Rotunda stands in the middle of a cemetery that is still in use today on a gentle slope on the northern edge of the village. It preserves the traditional Christian west-east layout. It is a nave sacral building with a circular ground plan, a semicircular apse and an attached western two-storey tower with a bell tower. The floors are visibly separated by distinctive horizontal cornices. The church is notable for its structural layout of the interior. The cylindrical space vaulted by a hemispherical vault is a typical feature of a rotunda and therefore belongs to this type of medieval buildings.

=== Paintings ===
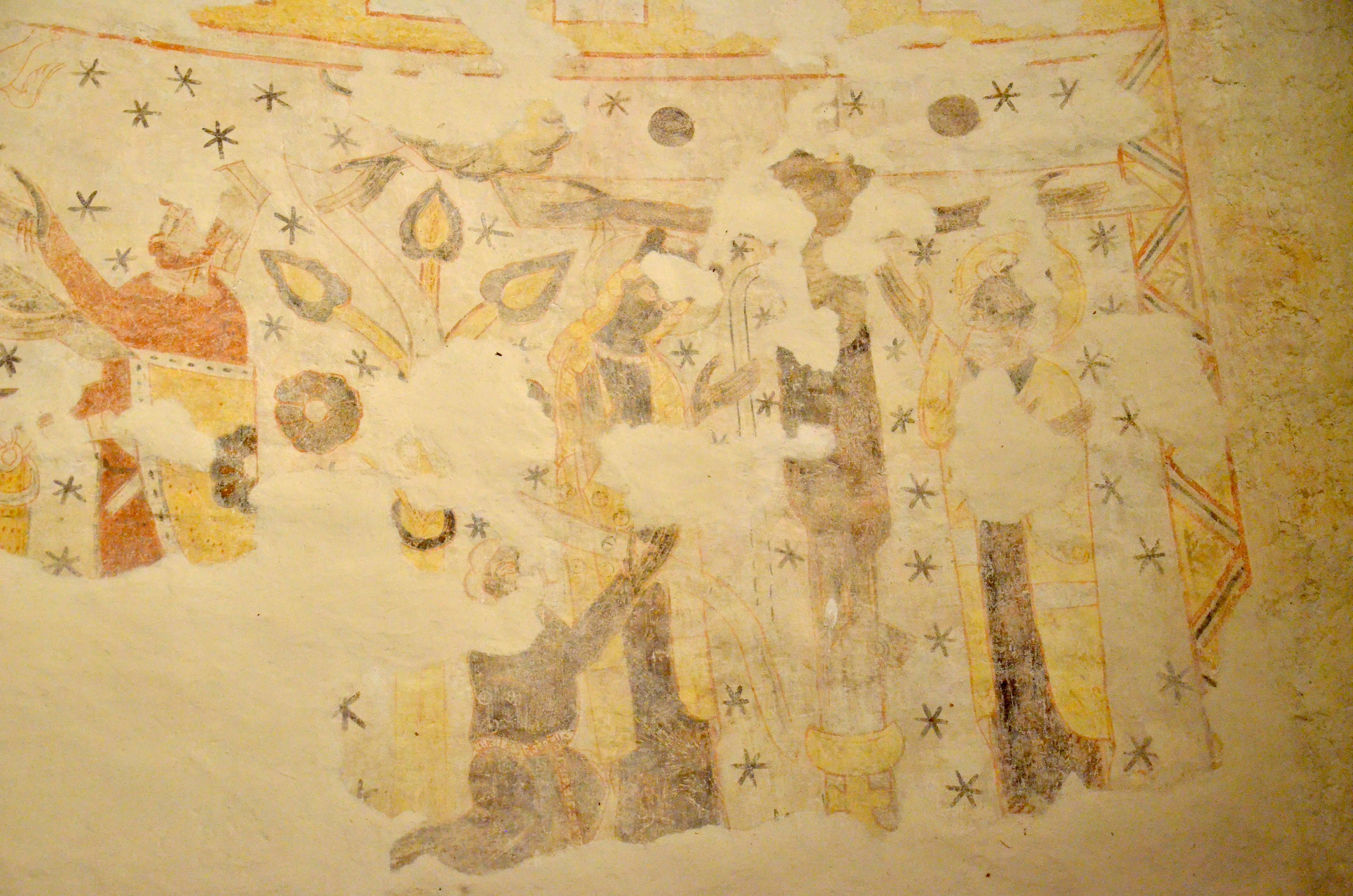
One of the frescoes.

The church is also known for its interior decoration, which is represented by wall paintings. When the building was reconstructed in 1932, Romanesque frescoes were discovered on the southern wall of the nave and in the apse, the creation of which experts date back to the first half of the 13th century to the 14th century. These are paintings with a Christological theme: scenes from the life of Jesus Christ from his birth to the crucifixion. On the southern wall of the apse there is a painting with a scene depicting the apostle Thomas. The paintings were first professionally published by the Czech historian Václav Mencl in 1937. In 1938, the Slovak art historian Vladimír Wagner pointed out the influence of northern Italian book painting in the case of the terechtic wall paintings. In 1961, the paintings were restored and conserved by academic painter and restorer Andrej Kuc.

== Preservation ==
The Dechtice Rotunda of All Saints was entered into the List of National Cultural Monuments under a separate catalogue number due to its architectural and historical contribution to the architectural history of Slovakia. The church, along with three dozen other sacral buildings throughout Slovakia, was also entered into the set of national cultural monuments under the name Medieval Murals.
