= Sedliacka Dubová =

- Municipality
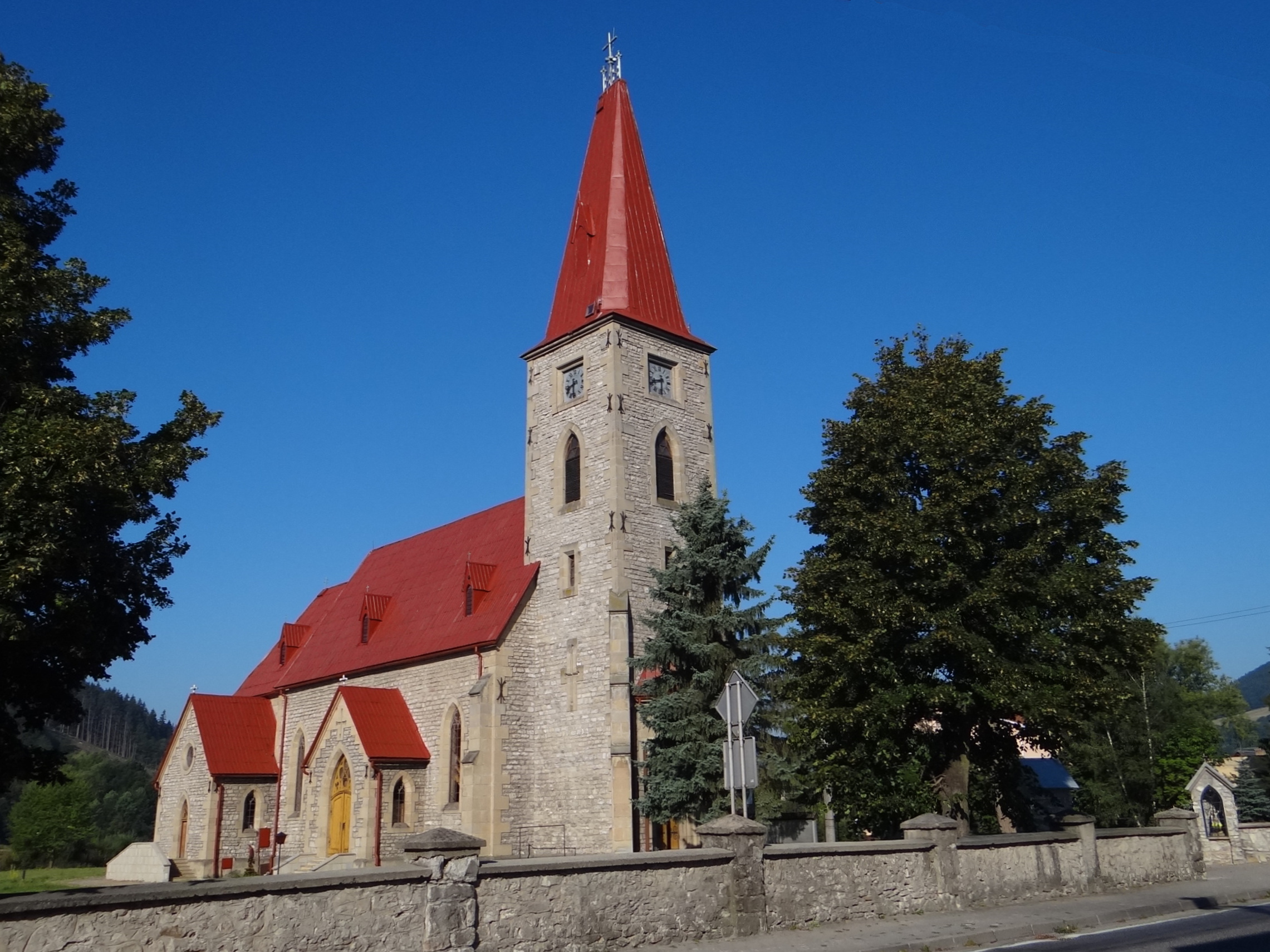

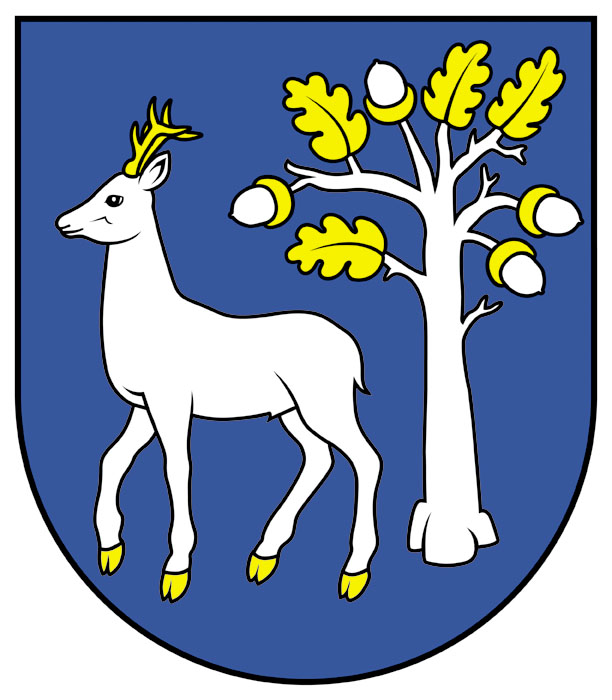
- Flag Coat of arms

- Location of Sedliacka Dubová in the Žilina Region Location of Sedliacka Dubová in Slovakia
- Coordinates: 49.27°N 19.43°E
- Country: Slovakia
- Region: Žilina Region
- District: Dolný Kubín District
- First mentioned: 1397

Area
  - Total: 11.64 km^{2} (4.49 sq mi)
- Elevation: 531 m (1,742 ft)

Population (2025)
  - Total: 534
- Time zone: UTC+1 (CET)
  - Summer (DST): UTC+2 (CEST)
- Postal code: 275 5
- Area code: +421 43
- Vehicle registration plate (until 2022): DK
- Website: sedliackadubova.sk

Sedliacka Dubová (Hungarian: Parasztdubova) is a village and municipality in Dolný Kubín District in the Žilina Region of northern Slovakia. It is situated at 594 m (1949 ft) and has about 513 inhabitants.

== Geography ==
The municipality lies at an altitude of 531 metres (1,742 ft) and covers an area of 11.64 km^{2} (4.49 sq mi) (2025).

== History ==
Before the establishment of independent Czechoslovakia in 1918, Sedliacka Dubová was part of Árva County within the Kingdom of Hungary. From 1939 to 1945, it was part of the Slovak Republic.

Peter Colotka, who was the prime minister of the Slovak Socialist Republic from 1969 to 1988, was a native of the village.

== Population ==
Population statistic (10 years)
Year	1995	2005	2015	2025
Count	500	502	517	534
Difference		+0.40%	+2.98%	+3.28%

Population statistic
Year	2024	2025
Count	536	534
Difference		−0.37%

It has a population of 534 people (31 December 2025).

=== Ethnicity ===
Census 2021 (1+ %)
Ethnicity	Number	Fraction
Slovak	526	97.04%
Not found out	15	2.76%
Total	542	

In year 2021 was 542 people by ethnicity 526 as Slovak, 15 as Not found out, 4 as Polish, 2 as Czech, 2 as Irish and 2 as Italian.

Note on population: The difference values of population numbers in the table "Population statistic" and in the sections "Ethnicity" & "Religion" is caused by the use of various statistical methods.

=== Religion ===
Census 2021 (1+ %)
Religion	Number	Fraction
Roman Catholic Church	481	88.75%
None	32	5.9%
Not found out	13	2.4%
Total	542	

In year 2021 was 542 people by religion 481 from Roman Catholic Church, 32 from None, 13 from Not found out, 5 from Ad hoc movements, 3 from Christian Congregations in Slovakia, 3 from Greek Catholic Church, 2 from Evangelical Church, 1 from Old Catholic Church, 1 from Eastern Orthodox Church and 1 from Other and not ascertained christian church.
