= Tamara Heribanová =

Slovak writer, journalist and presenter (born 1985)

Tamara Heribanová (born 6 May 1985) is a Slovak writer, journalist and presenter.
