= Zoltán Horváth (politician) =

Hungarian politician

Member of the National Assembly
- In office 18 June 2012 – 5 May 2014

Personal details
- Born: 30 April 1974 (age 51) Mohács, Hungary
- Party: Fidesz (since 1990)
- Profession: politician

Zoltán Horváth (born April 30, 1974) is a Hungarian politician, President of the General Assembly of Baranya County between 2011 and 2014.

He became a Member of Parliament from Fidesz's Baranya County Regional List on 18 June 2012, replacing Erik Bánki. Horváth was a member of the Parliamentary Committee on Sport and Tourism. He was appointed Director of the Baranya County Government Office on 1 July 2014.
