= Ivan Knotek =

Slovak politician (1936–2020)

Prime Minister of the Slovak Socialist Republic
- In office 12 October 1988 – 22 June 1989
- Preceded by: Peter Colotka
- Succeeded by: Pavel Hrivnák

Personal details
- Born: 26 August 1936 Senica
- Died: 11 March 2020 (aged 83) Galanta, Slovakia
- Party: Communist Party of Czechoslovakia; Communist Party of Slovakia

Ivan Knotek (26 August 1936 – 11 March 2020) was a Slovak politician who served as Politburo member and prime minister from 1988 to 1989 of the Slovak Socialist Republic.

== Biography ==
Knotek was born in Senica on 26 August 1936. He was a member of both the Communist Party of Czechoslovakia and the Slovak Communist Party. Between 1969 and 1981 he was the chief secretary of the latter's district committee in Galanta. He became a member of the Czech Communist Party's Politburo in April 1988. He was the chairman of the Politburo's two commissions, agriculture and food commission and youth work commission between 1987 and 1988. He retained his Politburo membership in the reshuffle on 10–11 October 1988.

He was also named prime minister on 12 October 1988, replacing Peter Colotka in the post. With this appointment he automatically became the deputy federal prime minister along with the Czech Prime Minister Ladislav Adamec. Knotek's tenure as prime minister ended on 22 June 1989, and he was succeeded by Pavel Hrivnák in the post. Then he served as the Communist Party's secretary for economic affairs. In a November 1989 reshuffle, Knotek retained his post at the politburo.

Knotek died in Galanta on 11 March 2020 at the age of 83.
