= Milan Čič =

Slovak politician (1932–2012)

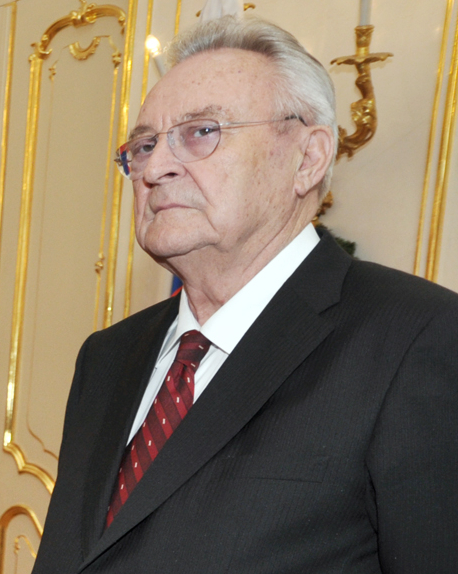
- Milan in 2012

Prime Minister of the Slovak Socialist Republic
- In office 10 December 1989 – 27 June 1990
- Deputy: Jozef Markuš (December 12, 1989 to June 26, 1990)
- Preceded by: Pavel Hrivnák
- Succeeded by: Vladimír Mečiar

Personal details
- Born: 2 January 1932 Zákamenné, Czechoslovakia
- Died: 9 November 2012 (aged 80) Bratislava, Slovakia
- Party: KSČ (1961–1990); VPN (1990–1991); HZDS (1991–1993); STRED (2000–2001)

Milan Čič (2 January 1932 – 9 November 2012) was a Slovak lawyer and politician who served as the prime minister of the Slovak Socialist Republic from 1989 to 1990.

Čič entered politics in 1961 as a member of the Communist Party of Czechoslovakia (leaving the party in 1990).

In 1993, he was appointed a judge of the Constitutional Court of the Slovak Republic, and shortly thereafter was appointed President of the Court. Čič had formally been a professor of law at Comenius University in Bratislava.

== See also ==
- List of prime ministers of the Slovak Socialist Republic

Political offices
Preceded by Pavel Hrivnák	Prime Minister of the Slovak Socialist Republic; 1989–1990	Succeeded by Vladimír Mečiar
