= Štefan Sádovský =

Prime Minister of the Slovak Socialist Republic

Štefan Sádovský (13 October 1928, Vlkas – 17 June 1984) was the prime minister of the Slovak Socialist Republic from 2 January 1969 to 5 May 1969, when he was replaced by Peter Colotka.

== See also ==
- Prime Minister of Slovakia
