= Malý Čepčín =

- Municipality
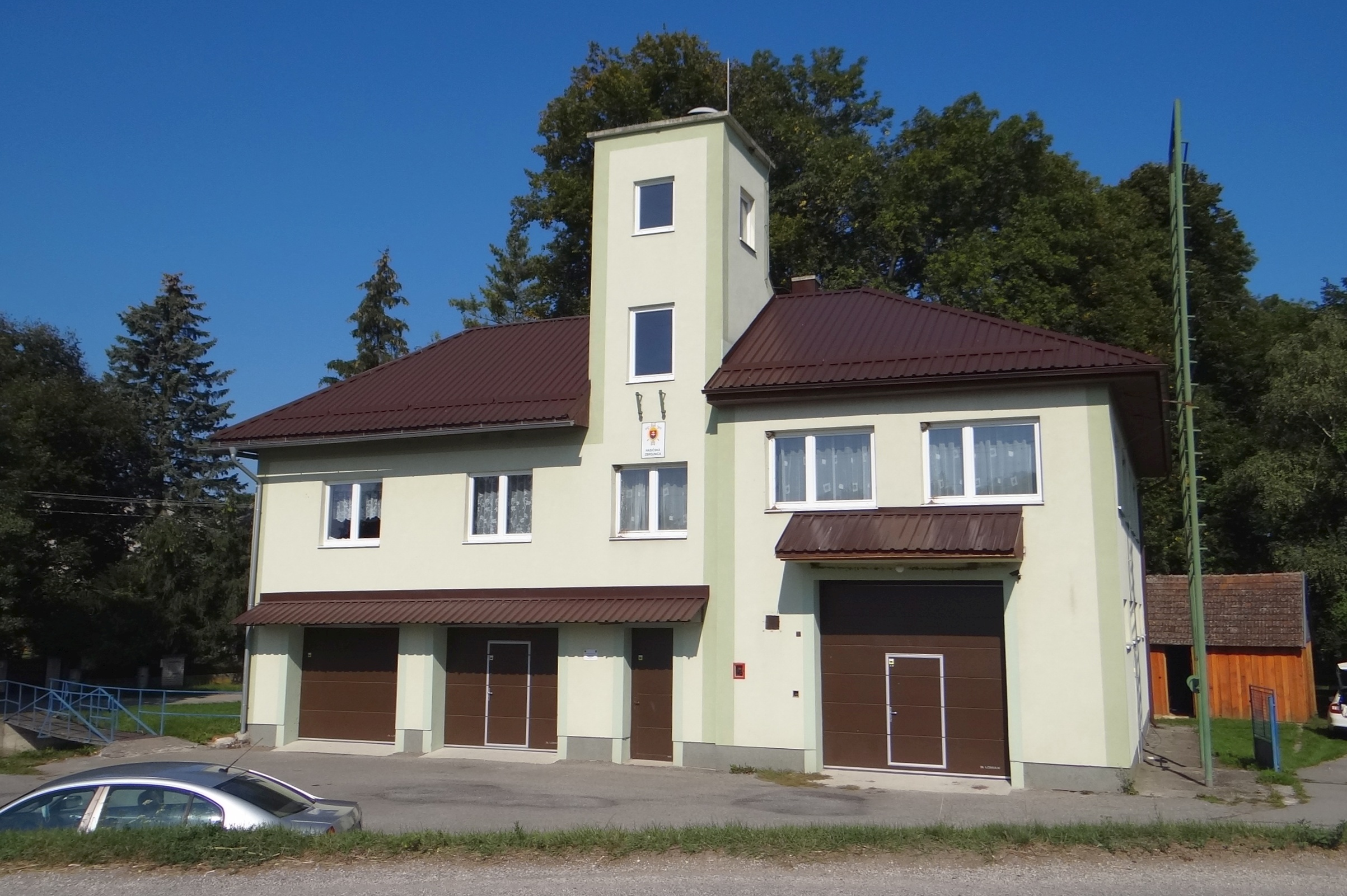

- Flag

- Location of Malý Čepčín in the Žilina Region Location of Malý Čepčín in Slovakia
- Coordinates: 48.90°N 18.83°E
- Country: Slovakia
- Region: Žilina Region
- District: Turčianske Teplice District
- First mentioned: 1254

Area
  - Total: 3.09 km^{2} (1.19 sq mi)
- Elevation: 464 m (1,522 ft)

Population (2025)
  - Total: 532
- Time zone: UTC+1 (CET)
  - Summer (DST): UTC+2 (CEST)
- Postal code: 384 5
- Area code: +421 43
- Vehicle registration plate (until 2022): RK
- Website: www.malycepcin.sk

Malý Čepčín (Hungarian: Kiscsepcsény) is a village and municipality in Turčianske Teplice District in the Žilina Region of northern central Slovakia.

== History ==
In historical records the village was first mentioned in 1254. Before the establishment of independent Czechoslovakia in 1918, it was part of Turóc County within the Kingdom of Hungary. From 1939 to 1945, it was part of the Slovak Republic.

== Geography ==
The municipality lies at an altitude of 464 metres (1,522 ft) and covers an area of 3.09 km^{2} (1.19 sq mi) (2025).

== Population ==
Population statistic (10 years)
Year	1995	2005	2015	2025
Count	528	530	541	532
Difference		+0.37%	+2.07%	−1.66%

Population statistic
Year	2024	2025
Count	545	532
Difference		−2.38%

It has a population of 532 people (31 December 2025).

=== Ethnicity ===
Census 2021 (1+ %)
Ethnicity	Number	Fraction
Slovak	540	99.08%
Not found out	7	1.28%
Total	545	

In year 2021 was 545 people by ethnicity 540 as Slovak, 7 as Not found out, 4 as Czech, 2 as Russian and 1 as Hungarian.

Note on population: The difference values of population numbers in the table "Population statistic" and in the sections "Ethnicity" & "Religion" is caused by the use of various statistical methods.

=== Religion ===
Census 2021 (1+ %)
Religion	Number	Fraction
Roman Catholic Church	213	39.08%
None	169	31.01%
Evangelical Church	132	24.22%
Not found out	7	1.28%
Total	545	

In year 2021 was 545 people by religion 213 from Roman Catholic Church, 169 from None, 132 from Evangelical Church, 7 from Not found out, 4 from Other and not ascertained christian church, 4 from Greek Catholic Church, 4 from United Methodist Church, 3 from Buddhism, 3 from Apostolic Church, 2 from Ad hoc movements, 1 from Paganism and natural spirituality, 1 from Christian Congregations in Slovakia, 1 from Other and 1 from Church of Jesus Christ of Latter-day Saints.
