= Peter Colotka =

Prime Minister of the Slovak Socialist Republic (1925–2019)

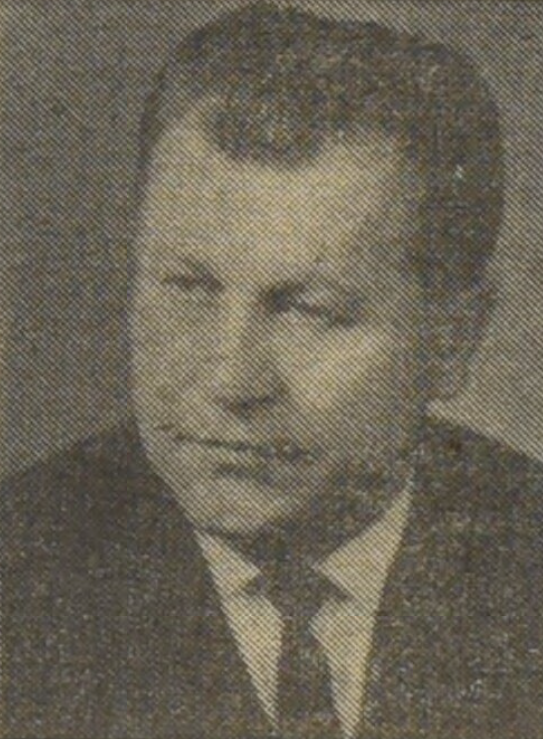

Prime Minister of the Slovak Socialist Republic
- In office 4 May 1969 – 12 October 1988
- Preceded by: Štefan Sádovský
- Succeeded by: Ivan Knotek

Personal details
- Born: 10 January 1925 Sedliacka Dubová, Dolný Kubín district, Czechoslovakia
- Died: 20 April 2019 (aged 94)
- Party: Communist Party of Czechoslovakia (until 1988); Communist Party of Slovakia (until 1988)
- Education: Comenius University in Bratislava

Peter Colotka (10 January 1925 – 20 April 2019) was a Slovak academic, lawyer and politician. He was the prime minister of the Slovak Socialist Republic from 1969 to 1988.

== Early life and education ==
Colotka was born in Sedliacka Dubová, Dolný Kubín district, on 10 January 1925. He studied law at Comenius University in Bratislava and graduated in 1950.

== Career ==
Following his graduation Colotka joined the University of Bratislava and taught civil and family law. He was the prorector of the university from 1959 to 1961. He served at the International Court of Justice at the Hague from 1963 to 1968. He became a professor of civil law in 1964.

He was a member of both the Communist Party of Czechoslovakia and the Slovak Communist Party. He was made deputy prime minister of Czechoslovakia in 1968 and was appointed president of the Czechoslovak Federal Assembly in the meeting of the Czech communist party held on 16–17 January 1969, replacing Josef Smrkovský in the post. And Colotka was a deputy at the Assembly from 1969 to 1989. He became a member of the Czechoslovak Communist Party's presidium in April 1969 and of its central committee in May 1971. He was elected to the Slovak Communist Party's presidium in May 1969 and to the central committee in May 1971.

Colotka was appointed prime minister of the Slovak Socialist Republic on 4 May 1969, replacing Stefan Sádovský in the post. He also served as deputy prime minister of Czechoslovakia from 1969 to 1988. He resigned from premiership on 12 October 1988 and was replaced by Ivan Knotek in the post. Colotka also resigned from the Czechoslovak Communist Party's presidium in October 1988.

Colotka was appointed Czechoslovak ambassador to France in late 1988 and served in the post until 19 January 1990.

== Controversy ==
Colotka was among the communist leaders who were interrogated about their role in the 1968 Soviet invasion. On 11 July 1990, Colotka was arrested and accused of embezzlement, abuse of power and theft. He was ultimately acquitted of all charges in 1994.

== Death ==
Peter Colotka died at age 94 on 20 April 2019.
