= Cabinet of Antonín Zápotocký and Viliam Široký =

Government of Czechoslovakia from 1948 to 1954

Government of Antonín Zápotocký and Viliam Široký
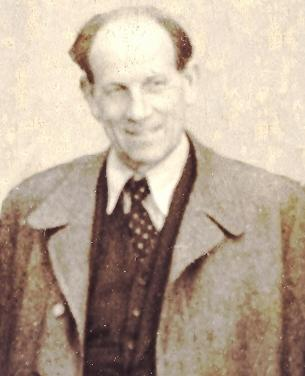
- Prime Minister Antonín Zápotocký (1949)
- Date formed: 15 June 1948
- Date dissolved: 12 December 1954

People and organisations
- Head of state: Klement Gottwald
- Head of government: Antonín Zápotocký (1948-1953); Viliam Široký (1953-1954)
- Deputy head of government: Václav Kopecký; Jaromír Dolanský; Karol Bacílek; Alexej Čepička; Viliam Široký; Zdeněk Fierlinger; Ján Ševčík; Ludvík Svoboda; Rudolf Slánský; Jozef Kyselý; Antonín Novotný; Zdeněk Nejedlý; Jindřich Uher; Oldřich Beran; Rudolf Barák
- Member parties: NF (KSČ, ČSS, ČSL, SSO, p. slobody)

History
- Predecessor: Gottwald II
- Successor: Široký II

The government of Antonín Zápotocký and Viliam Široký was the cabinet and government of Czechoslovakia in office between June 15, 1948, to December 12, 1954.

On March 21, 1953, there was a change in the post of Prime Minister as a result of the previous election of Antonín Zápotocký as President of the Republic. The resignation of the prime minister did not necessarily mean the resignation of the entire cabinet.

== Party representation in government ==
=== Number of Ministers ===
==== On appointment ====
- KSČ
16
- ČSS
2
- ČSL
2
- SSO
1
- SSL
1

==== On leaving office ====
- KSČ
26
- ČSS
2
- ČSL
2
- SSO
1

== Composition of the government ==
| Wallet | Minister | Party Member | Entering the office | Leaving office |
|---|---|---|---|---|
| Prime Minister | Antonín Zápotocky | KSČ | 15 June 1948 | 21 March 1953 |
| Prime Minister | Viliam Široký | KSČ | 21 March 1953 | 12 December 1954 |
| Deputy Prime Minister | Viliam Široký | KSČ | 15 June 1948 | 21 March 1953 |
| Deputy Prime Minister | Zdeněk Fierlinger | KSČ | 15 June 1948 | 14. September 1953 |
| Deputy Prime Minister | Ján Ševčík | SSO | 15 June 1948 | 29 May 1952 |
| Deputy Prime Minister | Ludvík Svoboda | KSČ | 25 April 1950 | 8 September 1951 |
| Deputy Prime Minister | Rudolf Slánský | KSČ | 8 September 1951 | 24 October 1951 |
| Deputy Prime Minister | Jaromír Dolanský | KSČ | 21 December 1951 | 14 September 1953 |
| Deputy Prime Minister | Joseph Kyselý | SSO | 4 June 1952 | 31 January 1953 |
| Deputy Prime Minister | Antonín Novotný | KSČ | 31 January 1953 | 14 September 1953 |
| Deputy Prime Minister | Zdeněk Nejedlý | KSČ | 31 January 1953 | 14 September 1953 |
| Deputy Prime Minister | Karol Bacílek | KSČ | 31 January 1953 | 14 September 1953 |
| Deputy Prime Minister | Alexei Cepička | KSČ | 31 January 1953 | 14 September 1953 |
| Deputy Prime Minister | Jindřich Uher | KSČ | 31 January 1953 | 12 December 1954 |
| Deputy Prime Minister | Václav Kopecký | KSČ | 31 January 1953 | 12 December 1954 |
| Deputy Prime Minister | Aldrich Beran | KSČ | 24 March 1953 | 14 September 1953 |
| Deputy Prime Minister | Rudolf Barák | KSČ | 24 March 1953 | 14 September 1953 |
| First Deputy | Jaromír Dolanský | KSČ | 14 September 1953 | 12 December 1954 |
| First Deputy | Alexei Cepička | KSČ | 14 September 1953 | 12 December 1954 |
| Minister of Foreign Affairs | Vladimír Clementis | KSČ | 15 June 1948 | 18 March 1950 |
| Minister of Foreign Affairs | Viliam Široky | KSČ | 18 March 1950 | 31 January 1953 |
| Minister of Foreign Affairs | Václav David | KSČ | 31 January 1953 | 12 December 1954 |
| Minister of National Defense | Ludvík Svoboda | KSČ | 15 June 1948 | 25 April 1950 |
| Minister of National Defense | Alexei Cepička | KSČ | 25 April 1950 | 12 December 1954 |
| Minister of Foreign Trade | Antonín Gregor | KSČ | 15 June 1948 | 2 December 1952 |
| Minister of Foreign Trade | Richard Dvořák | KSČ | 2 December 1952 | 12 December 1954 |
| Minister of the Interior | Václav Nosek | KSČ | 15 June 1948 | 14 September 1953 |
| Minister of the Interior | Rudolf Barák | KSČ | 14 September 1953 | 12 December 1954 |
| Minister of Finance | Jaromír Dolanský | KSČ | 15 June 1948 | 5 April 1949 |
| Minister of Finance | Jaroslav Kabeš | KSČ | 5 April 1949 | 14 September 1953 |
| Minister of Finance | Július Ďuriš | KSČ | 14 September 1953 | 12 December 1954 |
| Minister of Higher Education | Ladislav Štoll | KSČ | 31 January 1953 | 14 September 1953 |
| Minister of Education and Enlightenment | Zdeněk Nejedlý | KSČ | 15 June 1948 | 31 January 1953 |
| Minister of Education and Enlightenment | Ernest Sýkora | KSČ | 31 January 1953 | 14 September 1953 |
| Minister of Education and Enlightenment | Ladislav Štoll | KSČ | 14 September 1953 | 12 December 1954 |
| Minister of Justice | Alexei Cepička | KSČ | 15 June 1948 | 25 April 1950 |
| Minister of Justice | Štefan Rais | KSČ | 25 April 1950 | 14 September 1953 |
| Minister of Justice | Václav Škoda | KSČ | 14 September 1953 | 12 December 1954 |
| Minister of Information | Václav Kopecký | KSČ | 15 June 1948 | 31 January 1953 |
| Minister of Culture | Václav Kopecký | KSČ | 14 September 1953 | 12 December 1954 |
| Minister of Industry (Heavy Industry) | Gustav Kliment | KSČ | 15 June 1948 | 1 August 1952 |
| Minister of Industry (Heavy Industry) | Július Maurer | KSČ | 1 August 1952 | 31 January 1953 |
| Minister of Industry (Heavy Industry) | Karel Poláček | KSČ | 31 January 1953 | 12 December 1954 |
| Minister of Light Industry | Josef Jonáš | KSČ | 20 December 1950 | 8 September 1951 |
| Minister of Light Industry | Alois Málek | KSČ | 8 September 1951 | 12 December 1954 |
| Minister of Agriculture | Július Ďuriš | KSČ | 15 June 1948 | 10 September 1951 |
| Minister of Agriculture | Josef Nepomucký | KSČ | 10 September 1951 | 14 September 1953 |
| Minister of Agriculture | Jindřich Uher | KSČ | 14 September 1953 | 12 December 1954 |
| Minister of Internal Trade | František Krajčir | KSČ | 15 June 1948 | 12 December 1954 |
| Minister of Redemption | Josef Krosnář | KSČ | 28 May 1952 | 12 December 1954 |
| Minister of Transport | Alois Petr | ČSL | 15 June 1948 | 14 December 1951 |
| Minister of Transport | Antonín Pospíšil | ČSL | 21 December 1951 | 12 December 1954 |
| Post Minister (from April 30, 1952, connections) | Alois Neuman | ČSS | 15 June 1948 | 12 December 1954 |
| Minister of Social Welfare (Labor Force) | Evžen Erban | KSČ | 15 June 1948 | 8 September 1951 |
| Minister of Social Welfare (Labor Force) | Jaroslav Havelka | KSČ | 8 September 1951 | 14 September 1953 |
| Minister of Social Welfare (Labor Force) | Václav Nosek | KSČ | 14 September 1953 | 12 December 1954 |
| Minister of Health | Josef Plojhar | ČSL, secretly also KSČ | 15 June 1948 | 12 December 1954 |
| Minister of Technology | Emanuel Schlechta | ČSS | 15 June 1948 | 20 December 1950 |
| Minister of Construction Industry (construction industry) | Emanuel Schlechta | ČSS | 20 December 1950 | 12 December 1954 |
| Minister of Food (food industry) | Ludmila Jankovcová | KSČ | 15 June 1948 | 12 December 1954 |
| Minister for Unification of Laws | Vavro Šrobár | Freedom Party | 15 June 1948 | 6 December 1950 |
| Minister of National Security | Ladislav Kopřiva | KSČ | 23 May 1950 | 23 January 1952 |
| Minister of National Security | Karol Bacílek | KSČ | 23 January 1952 | 14 September 1953 |
| Minister of State Control | Karol Bacílek | KSČ | 8 September 1951 | 23 January 1952 |
| Minister of State Control | Jan Must | KSČ | 23 January 1952 | 14 September 1953 |
| Minister of State Control | Aldrich Beran | KSČ | 14 September 1953 | 12 December 1954 |
| Minister of Fuel and Energy | Václav Pokorný | KSČ | 8 September 1951 | 14 September 1953 |
| Minister of Fuel and Energy | Josef Jonáš | KSČ | 14 September 1953 | 12 December 1954 |
| Minister of Metallurgical Industry and Ore Mines | Jan Bílek | KSČ | 8 September 1951 | 24 March 1953 |
| Minister of Metallurgical Industry and Ore Mines | Josef Reitmajer | KSČ | 24 March 1953 | 12 December 1954 |
| Minister of Forests and Timber Industry | Marek Smida | KSČ | 8 September 1951 | 31 January 1953 |
| Minister of Forests and Timber Industry | Július Ďuriš | KSČ | 31 January 1953 | 14 September 1953 |
| Minister of Forests and Timber Industry | Marek Smida | KSČ | 14 September 1953 | 12 December 1954 |
| Minister of Chemical Industry | Jozef Púčik | KSČ | 8 September 1951 | 21 December 1951 |
| Minister of Chemical Industry | Otakar Šimůnek | KSČ | 21 December 1951 | 22 June 1954 |
| Minister of Chemical Industry | Jozef Púčik | KSČ | 22 June 1954 | 12 December 1954 |
| Minister of Railways | Josef Pospíšil | KSČ | 1 August 1952 | 14 September 1953 |
| Minister of Building Materials | Joseph Kyselý | SSO | 31 January 1953 | 14 September 1953 |
| Minister of Local Economy | Joseph Kyselý | SSO | 14 September 1953 | 12 December 1954 |
| Minister of State Assets | Marek Smida | KSČ | 31 January 1953 | 14 September 1953 |
| Minister of Energy | Bohumil Šrámek | KSČ | 31 January 1953 | 14 September 1953 |
| Minister without portfolio | Július Maurer | KSČ | 31 January 1953 | 12 December 1954 |
| Minister without portfolio | Zdeněk Nejedlý | KSČ | 14 September 1953 | 12 December 1954 |
| Minister and Chairman of the State Planning Office | Jaromír Dolanský | KSČ | 5 April 1949 | 21 December 1951 |
| Minister and Chairman of the State Planning Office | Jozef Púčik | KSČ | 21 December 1951 | 22 June 1954 |
| Minister and Chairman of the State Planning Office | Otakar Šimůnek | KSČ | 22 June 1954 | 12 December 1954 |

== See also ==
- Slánský trial
