= Viliam Široký's Second Cabinet =

Government of Czechoslovakia from 1954 to 1960

Second government of Viliam Široký
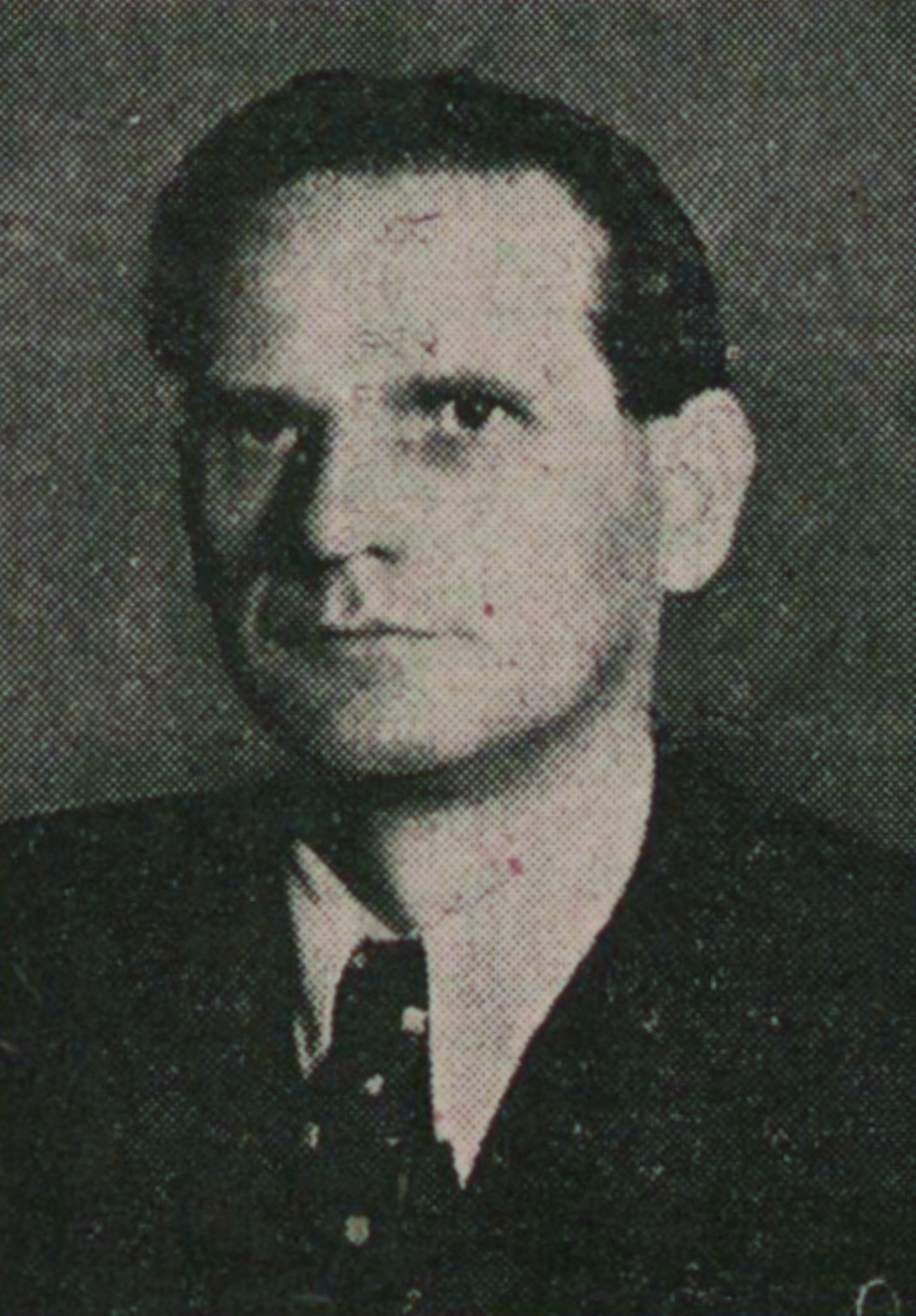
- Date formed: 12 December 1954
- Date dissolved: 11 July 1960

People and organisations
- Head of state: Antonín Zápotocký
- Head of government: Viliam Široký
- Deputy head of government: Jaromír Dolanský; Alexej Čepička; Václav Kopecký; Ludmila Jankovcová; Václav Škoda; Karel Poláček; Rudolf Barák; Otakar Šimůnek
- Member parties: NF (KSČ, ČSS, ČSL, SSO)

History
- Predecessor: Zápotocký/Siroký
- Successor: Široký III

The second government of Viliam Široký lasted from 12 December 1954 to 11 July 1960. Most of the members of the government were members of the Communist Party, but there were also five representatives of other political parties NF, namely: 2 representatives of the People's Party, 2 representatives of the ČSS, and one representative of the SSO.

== Composition of the government ==
Wallet	Minister	Party Member	Entering the office	Leaving office
Prime Minister	Viliam Široký	KSČ	12 December 1954	11 July 1960
First Deputy	Jaromír Dolanský	KSČ	12 December 1954	11 July 1960
First Deputy	Alexej Čepička	KSČ	12 December 1954	25 April 1956
Deputy Prime Minister	Václav Kopecký	KSČ	12 December 1954	11 July 1960
Deputy Prime Minister	Ludmila Jankovcová	KSČ	12 December 1954	11 July 1960
Deputy Prime Minister	Václav Škoda	KSČ	12 December 1954	16 June 1956
Deputy Prime Minister	Karel Poláček	KSČ	12 December 1954	5 April 1958
Deputy Prime Minister	Rudolf Barák	KSČ	6 March 1959	11 July 1960
Deputy Prime Minister	Otakar Šimůnek	KSČ	6 March 1959	11 July 1960
Minister of the Interior	Rudolf Barák	KSČ	12 December 1954	11 July 1960
Minister of National Defense	Alexei Cepička	KSČ	12 December 1954	25 April 1956
Minister of National Defense	Bohumír Lomský	KSČ	25 April 1956	11 July 1960
Minister of Local Economy	Joseph Kyselý	SSO	12 December 1954	1 April 1958
Minister of Health	Josef Plojhar	ČSL	12 December 1954	11 July 1960
Minister of Construction	Emanuel Schlechta	ČSS	12 December 1954	16 June 1956
Minister of Construction	Aldrich Beran	KSČ	16 June 1956	11 July 1960
Minister of Foreign Affairs	Václav David	KSČ	16 June 1956	11 July 1960
Minister of Finance	Július Ďuriš	KSČ	12 December 1954	11 July 1960
Minister of Internal Trade	František Krajčir	KSČ	12 December 1954	17 January 1959
Minister of Internal Trade	Ladislav Brabec	KSČ	17 January 1959	11 July 1960
Minister of Forests and Timber Industry	Josef Krosnář	KSČ	12 December 1954	16 June 1956
Minister of Redemption	Božena Machačová-Dostálová	KSČ	12 December 1954	16 June 1956
Minister of Engineering (from 15 October 1955 of heavy industry)	Karel Poláček	KSČ	12 December 1954	15 October 1955
Minister of Engineering (from 15 October 1955 of heavy industry)	Jan Bukal	KSČ	15 October 1955	1 August 1957
Minister of Engineering (from 15 October 1955 of heavy industry)	Josef Reitmajer	KSČ	1 August 1957	11 July 1960
Minister of Culture	Ladislav Štoll	KSČ	12 December 1954	11 July 1960
Minister of the Food Industry (from June 16, 1956 of the Food Industry and Purchase)	Jindřich Uher	KSČ	12 December 1954	11 July 1960
Minister of State Control	Aldrich Beran	KSČ	12 December 1954	15 October 1955
Minister of State Control	Michal Bakula	KSČ	15 October 1955	16 June 1956
Minister of State Control	Josef Krosnář	KSČ	16 June 1956	11 July 1960
Minister of fuel and energy (from 30 May 1955 fuel)	Josef Jonáš	KSČ	12 December 1954	11 July 1960
Minister of Metallurgical Industry and Ore Mines	Josef Reitmajer	KSČ	12 December 1954	1 August 1957
Minister of Metallurgical Industry and Ore Mines	Václav Černý	KSČ	1 August 1957	11 July 1960
Minister of Agriculture (from June 16, 1956 agriculture and forestry)	Marek Smida	KSČ	12 December 1954	15 October 1955
Minister of Agriculture (from June 16, 1956 agriculture and forestry)	Vratislav Krutina	KSČ	15 October 1955	16 June 1956
Minister of Agriculture (from June 16, 1956 agriculture and forestry)	Michal Bakula	KSČ	16 June 1956	6 March 1959
Minister of Agriculture (from June 16, 1956 agriculture and forestry)	Lubomír Štrougal	KSČ	6 March 1959	11 July 1960
Minister of Justice	Jan Bartuška	KSČ	12 December 1954	16 June 1956
Minister of Justice	Václav Škoda	KSČ	16 June 1956	11 July 1960
Minister of Foreign Trade	Richard Dvořák	KSČ	12 December 1954	17 January 1959
Minister of Foreign Trade	František Krajčir	KSČ	17 January 1959	11 July 1960
Minister of Education (from June 16, 1956 education and culture)	František Kahuda	KSČ	12 December 1954	11 July 1960
Minister of Light Industry (from June 16, 1956 Minister of Consumer Industry)	Alois Málek	KSČ	12 December 1954	16 June 1956
Minister of Light Industry (from June 16, 1956 Minister of Consumer Industry)	Božena Machačová-Dostálová	KSČ	16 June 1956	11 July 1960
Minister of Communications	Alois Neuman	ČSS	12 December 1954	11 July 1960
Minister of Manpower	Václav Nosek	KSČ	12 December 1954	22 July 1955
Minister of Manpower	Josef Tesla	KSČ	15 October 1955	31 July 1957
Minister of Transport	Antonín Pospíšil	ČSL	12 December 1954	8 January 1958
Minister of Transport	František Vlasák	KSČ	8 January 1958	11 July 1960
Minister of Chemical Industry	Jozef Púčik	KSČ	12 December 1954	11 July 1960
Minister of Energy (since April 1, 1958 of Energy and Water Management)	František Vlasák	KSČ	30 May 1955	8 January 1958
Minister of Energy (since April 1, 1958 of Energy and Water Management)	Antonín Pospíšil	ČSL	8 January 1958	11 July 1960
Minister of Precision Engineering	Václav Ouzký	KSČ	15 October 1955	15 October 1958
Minister of the Automotive Industry and Agricultural Machinery	Emil Hammered	KSČ	15 October 1955	15 October 1958
Minister of State Assets	Marek Smida	KSČ	15 October 1955	16 June 1956
Minister of General Engineering	Karel Poláček	KSČ	15 October 1958	11 July 1960
Minister without portfolio	Zdeněk Nejedlý	KSČ	12 December 1954	11 July 1960
Minister without portfolio	Július Maurer	KSČ	12 December 1954	16 June 1956
Minister without portfolio	Josef Tesla	KSČ	31 July 1957	6 March 1959
Minister without portfolio	Václav Ouzký	KSČ	15 October 1958	9 February 1959
Minister - Chairman of the State Planning Office	Otakar Šimůnek	KSČ	12 December 1954	11 July 1960
Minister - Chairman of the State Committee for Construction	Aldrich Beran	KSČ	15 October 1955	16 June 1956
Minister - Chairman of the State Committee for Construction	Emanuel Schlechta	ČSS	16 June 1956	17 March 1960
Minister - Chairman of the Government Committee for the Improvement of Agriculture, Forestry and Water Management	Joseph Kyselý	SSO	15 October 1958	11 July 1960
Minister - Chairman of the State Committee for Technology Development	Václav Ouzký	KSČ	9 February 1959	11 July 1960

== Links ==
- Milan Churaň et al.: Who was who in our history in the 20th century, Volume 1 (A–M), Volume 2 (N-Ž), Libri, Prague 1998 (2nd edition), ISBN 80-85983-44-3 (1st volume), ISBN 80-85983-64-8 (2nd volume), ISBN 80-85983-65-6 (file)
- Government of Viliam Široky on the website of the government of the Czech Republic
