= Klement Gottwald's Second Cabinet =

Klement Gottwald's Second Cabinet was the cabinet and government of Czechoslovakia in office between 25 February and 15 June 1948. It was formed following the 1948 Czechoslovak coup d'état, and marked the onset of four decades of Communist rule in the country.

== Background ==
In the 1946 Czechoslovak parliamentary election the Communist Party of Czechoslovakia (KSČ) emerged as the largest party, winning 114 of the 300 seats in the Constituent National Assembly with 38% of the vote. Following the elections, the National Front formed a coalition government, headed by KSČ leader Klement Gottwald. Although the government still had a non-Communist majority (nine Communists and seventeen non-Communists), the KSČ had initial control over the police and armed forces through Interior Minister Václav Nosek; in addition to this, the KSČ was gradually able to fill various other positions in the security apparatus with its own candidates.

During the winter of 1947–1948, the tensions between Communists and non-Communists led to increasingly bitter conflict, both in the Cabinet and in parliament. When the non-Communist ministers protested against Nosek's transformations of the security apparatus in February 1948, the Communists responded by mobilizing groups of their supporters across the country. On 13 February, Nosek refused to reverse the recent dismissal of eight senior non-Communist police officers, despite a majority vote in the Cabinet instructing him to do so. In protest, twelve non-Communist ministers resigned from the government on 20 February, hoping that it would lead to the fall of the government and new elections. However, as the ministers of the Czechoslovak Social Democracy and Foreign Minister Jan Masaryk chose not to resign, the government remained.

Earlier during the government crisis, President Edvard Beneš had stated that he would refuse the replacement of the non-Communist ministers with KSČ members. Despite this, he accepted a new, Communist-dominated government proposed by Gottwald on 25 February, likely out of fear of civil war or Soviet intervention, or hoping to be in a position to later make deals with the KSČ.

== Composition ==
Title	Minister		Term of office		Party
Title	Minister		Start	End	Party
Prime Minister	Klement Gottwald	Klement Gottwald	25 February 1948	15 June 1948	KSČ
Deputy Prime Minister	Viliam Široký	Viliam Široký	25 February 1948	15 June 1948	KSČ
Deputy Prime Minister	Antonín Zápotocký	Antonín Zápotocký	25 February 1948	15 June 1948	KSČ
Deputy Prime Minister	Bohumil Laušman	Bohumil Laušman	25 February 1948	15 June 1948	ČSSD
Minister of Foreign Affairs	Jan Masaryk	Jan Masaryk	25 February 1948	10 March 1948	Independent
Minister of Foreign Affairs	Vladimir Clementis	Vladimir Clementis	18 March 1948	15 June 1948	KSČ
Minister of National Defense	Klement Gottwald	Ludvík Svoboda	25 February 1948	15 June 1948	KSČ
Minister of Foreign Trade	Antonín Gregor	Antonín Gregor	25 February 1948	15 June 1948	KSČ
Minister of the Interior	Václav Nosek	Václav Nosek	25 February 1948	15 June 1948	KSČ
Minister of Finance	Jaromír Dolanský	Jaromír Dolanský	25 February 1948	15 June 1948	KSČ
Minister of Education and Culture	Zdeněk Nejedlý	Zdeněk Nejedlý	25 February 1948	15 June 1948	KSČ
Minister of Justice	Alexej Čepička	Alexej Čepička	25 February 1948	15 June 1948	KSČ
Minister of Information	Václav Kopecký	Václav Kopecký	25 February 1948	15 June 1948	KSČ
Minister of Industry	Zdeněk Fierlinger	Zdeněk Fierlinger	25 February 1948	15 June 1948	ČSSD
Minister of Agriculture	Július Ďuriš	Július Ďuriš	25 February 1948	15 June 1948	KSČ
Minister of Internal Trade	František Krajčír	František Krajčír	25 February 1948	15 June 1948	KSČ
Minister of Transport	Alois Petr	Alois Petr	25 February 1948	15 June 1948	ČSL
Minister of Labour and Social Welfare	Evžen Erban	Evžen Erban	25 February 1948	15 June 1948	ČSSD
Minister of Public Health	Josef Plojhar	Josef Plojhar	25 February 1948	15 June 1948	ČSL
Minister of Technical Planning	Emanuel Šlechta	Emanuel Šlechta	25 February 1948	15 June 1948	ČSNS
Minister of Food	Ludmila Jankovcová	Ludmila Jankovcová	25 February 1948	15 June 1948	ČSSD
Minister of Postal Services	Alois Neuman	Alois Neuman	25 February 1948	15 June 1948	ČSNS
Minister of Unification	Vavro Šrobár	Vavro Šrobár	25 February 1948	15 June 1948	SSI
Secretary of State for Foreign Affairs	Vladimir Clementis	Vladimir Clementis	25 February 1948	18 March 1948	KSČ
Secretary of State for National Defense	Ján Ševčík	Ján Ševčík	25 February 1948	18 March 1948	DS
