= List of ministers of foreign trade of Czechoslovakia =

This is a list of the ministers of foreign trade of Czechoslovakia, which provides a chronological overview of all members of the governments of Czechoslovakia serving in this office (including ministers serving in these governments under derived official names of the ministry, such as the minister for foreign trade).

== Ministers of foreign trade of the First Czechoslovak Republic 1918–1938 ==
#	Name	Photo	Party	Government	Term of office	Notes	Ref.
1.	Rudolf Hotowetz		Independent	Tusar II	25 May 1920 – 15 September 1920	Minister of Foreign Trade	
1.	Rudolf Hotowetz		Independent	Černý I	15 September 1920 – 26 September 1921	Administrator of the Ministry of Foreign Trade	
2	Ladislav Novák		Czechoslovak National Democracy	Government of Edvard Beneš; Švehla I	26 September 1921 – 19 January 1922	Minister of Foreign Trade. The ministry was abolished afterward.	

== Ministers of foreign trade of post-war Czechoslovakia ==
#	Name	Photo	Party	Government	Term of office	Notes	Ref.
1	Hubert Ripka		Czechoslovak National Social Party|	Fierlinger I Fierlinger II; Gottwald I |	4 April 1945 – 25 February 1948|	Minister of Foreign Trade	
2	Antonín Gregor		Communist Party of Czechoslovakia	Gottwald II; Zápotocký/Široký	25 February 1948 – 2 December 1952	Minister of Foreign Trade	
3	Richard Dvořák		Communist Party of Czechoslovakia	Zápotocký/Široký; Široký II	2 December 1952 – 17 January 1959	Minister of Foreign Trade	
4	František Krajčír		Communist Party of Czechoslovakia	Široký II; Široký III	17 January 1959 – 5 January 1963	Minister of Foreign Trade	
5	František Hamouz		Communist Party of Czechoslovakia	Široký III; Lenárt	5 January 1963 – 8 April 1968	Minister of Foreign Trade	
6	Václav Valeš		Communist Party of Czechoslovakia	Černík I	8 April 1968 – 31 December 1968	Minister of Foreign Trade	

== Federal ministers of foreign trade of Czechoslovakia ==
#	Name	Photo	Party	Government	Term of office	Notes	Ref.
1	Jan Tabaček		Communist Party of Slovakia	Černík II	1 January 1969 – 29 September 1969	Minister of Foreign Trade	
2	František Hamouz		Communist Party of Czechoslovakia	Černík III	29 September 1969 – 28 January 1970	Minister of Foreign Trade	
3	Andrej Barčák		Communist Party of Slovakia	1st Government of Lubomír Štrougal; 2nd Government of Lubomír Štrougal; 3rd Government of Lubomír Štrougal	28 January 1970 – 17 June 1981	Minister of Foreign Trade	
4	Bohumil Urban		Communist Party of Czechoslovakia	4th Government of Lubomír Štrougal; 5th Government of Lubomír Štrougal	17 June 1981 – 21 December 1987	Minister of Foreign Trade	
5	Jan Štěrba (politician)		Communist Party of Czechoslovakia	5th Government of Lubomír Štrougal; 6th Government of Lubomír Štrougal; Government of Ladislav Adamec	28 December 1987 – 3 December 1989	Minister of Foreign Trade	
6	Andrej Barčák Jr.		Communist Party of Slovakia	Government of Ladislav Adamec; 1st Government of Marián Čalfa	3 December 1989 – 27 June 1990	Minister of Foreign Trade	
7	Slavomír Stračár		Public Against Violence	2nd Government of Marián Čalfa	27 June 1990 – 21 August 1990	Minister of Foreign Trade	
8	Jozef Bakšay		Public Against Violence	2nd Government of Marián Čalfa	25 January 1991 – 2 July 1992	Minister of Foreign Trade	
9	Jan Stráský		Civic Democratic Party	Government of Jan Stráský	2 July 1992 – 29 October 1992	Minister designated to manage the Ministry of Foreign Trade	
