= National Monument at Vítkov =

War memorial in Prague

- Národní památník na Vítkově (Czech)
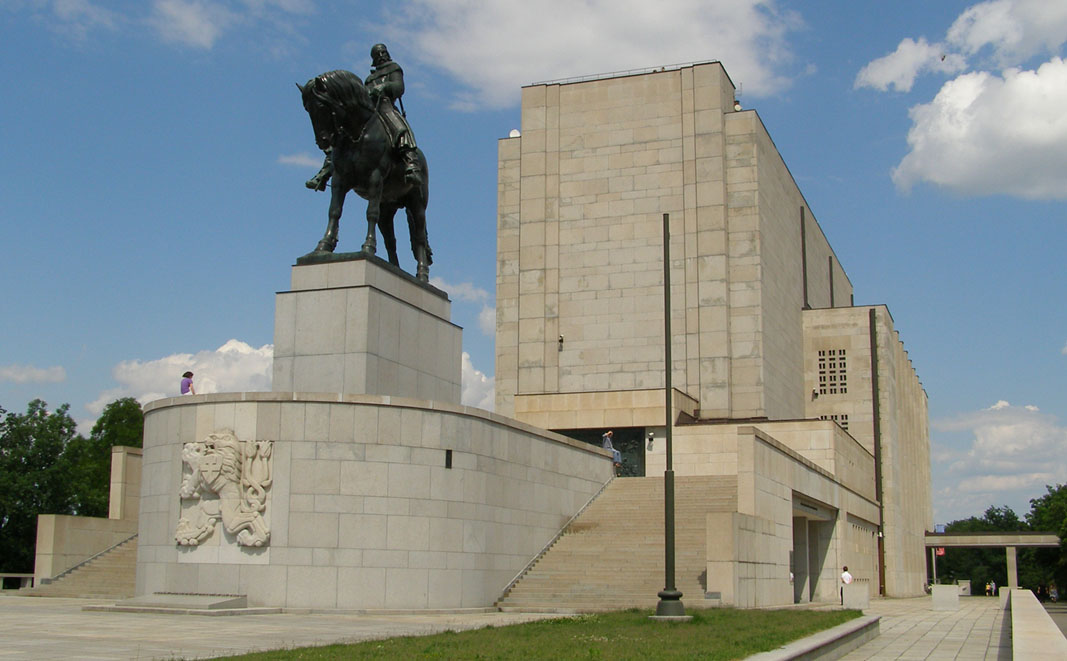
- Year: 1933
- Type: Sculpture
- Location: Prague, Czech Republic; 50.088717°N 14.449982°E
- Website: www.nm.cz/en/visit-us/buildings/the-national-memorial-on-the-vitkov-hill

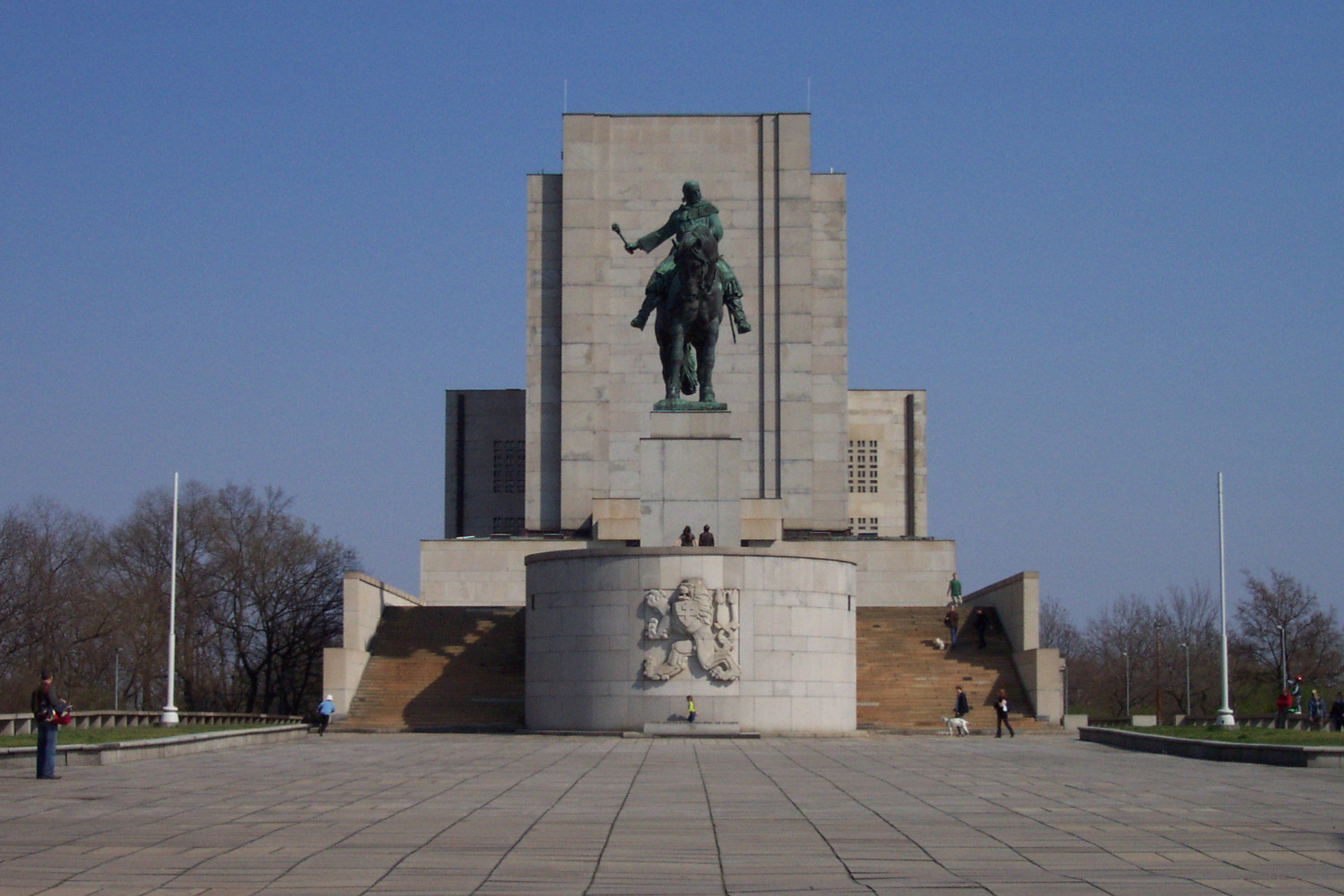
The National Monument at Vítkov Hill

The National Monument at Vítkov (Czech: Národní památník na Vítkově) on top of Vítkov Hill in Prague's Žižkov district is one of the most important buildings commemorating the Czech statehood.

It includes the third-largest bronze rider statue in the world, of Jan Žižka, who defeated the Catholic forces led by King Sigismund in 1420 at the Battle of Vítkov Hill. The Monument also includes the Ceremonial Hall, an exhibition entitled Crossroads of Czech and Czechoslovak Statehood, the Tomb of the Unknown Soldier and other exhibition halls.

The Monument was built from 1928 to 1938 in honor of the World War I Czechoslovak legionaries. After 1948, it was used to promote the communist regime. Between 1954 and 1962, it housed the mausoleum of Klement Gottwald. In 2000, the monument was acquired by the National Museum, which conducted a major restoration work. After over two years of reconstruction, the Memorial was opened to the public on 29 October 2009.

== The history of Vítkov Hill ==
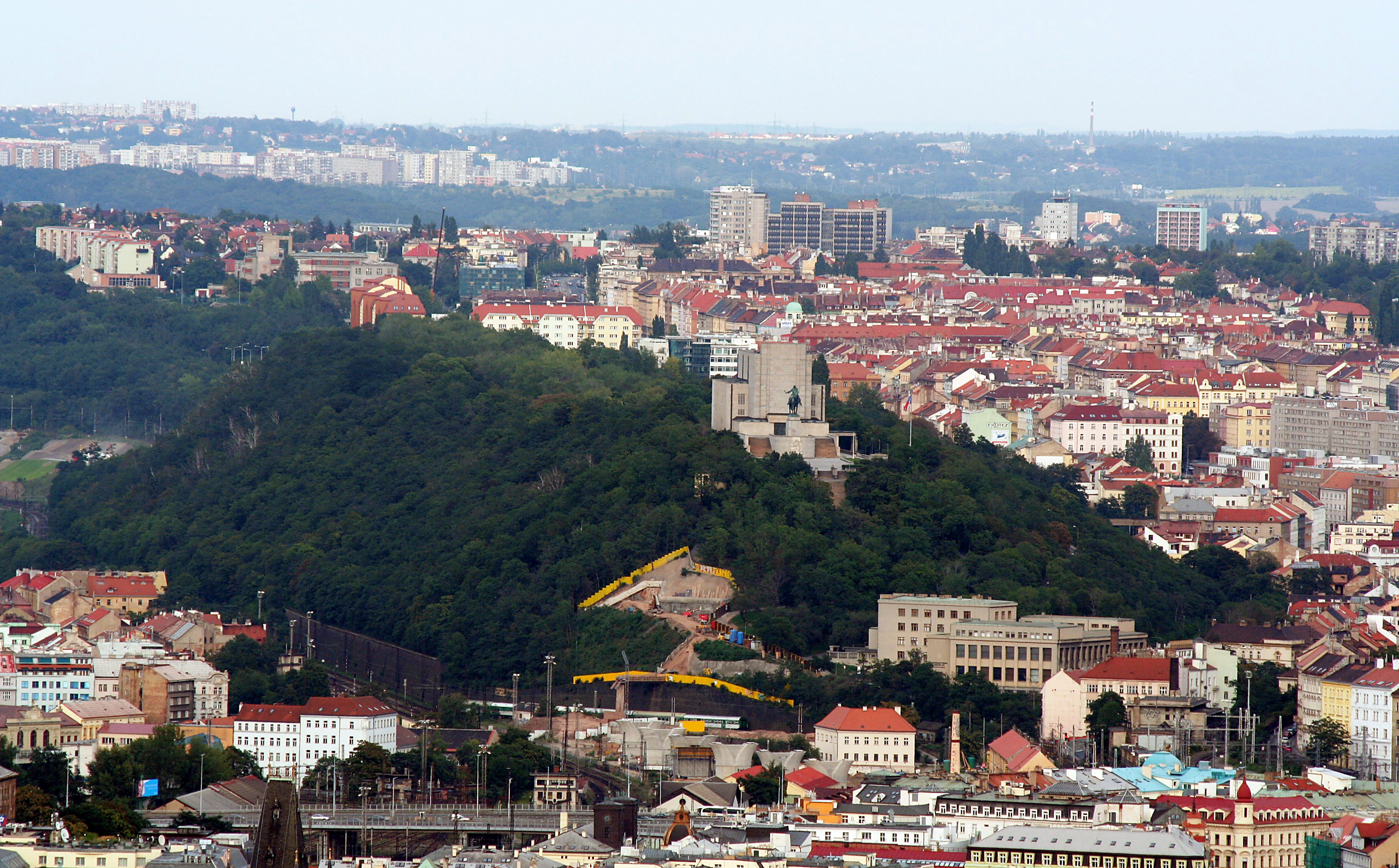
Vítkov Hill in Žižkov

Vítkov has played a role in several important events in Czech history. The first written mention of Vítkov is from the 14th century, during the reign of Charles IV, who had vineyards planted on the hills around Prague. The vineyards stretched from the foot of Vítkov through Vinohrady to Karlov. As well as grapes, Vítkov hill was also used for the cultivation of hops.

Vítkov played a major role in the Hussite Wars. In April and May 1420, Sigismund, Holy Roman Emperor led a Pope-sanctioned crusade army against the Hussite movement. As Sigismund proceeded towards Prague, the representatives of the city decided to stand against Sigismund and asked Tábor and other Hussite-controlled boroughs for help. Sigismund seized Hradčany and Vyšehrad while the Hussite forces controlled Vítkov. The decisive Battle of Vítkov Hill took place on 14 July 1420, when the Hussite forces defeated the crusader army.

In the second half of the 19th century, Czech nationalism was displayed in historical places, among them Žižkov and Vítkov Hill. In 1877, the town of Královské Vinohrady I was renamed Žižkov, as Jan Žižka, leader of the radical Hussites, was perceived as a symbol of the fight for Czech interests. In 1881 Žižkov was promoted to the status of a town. Vítkov was seen as a symbol of the Czechs and the ancient glory of the Czech nation, which led to the idea of building a monument to Žižka there. The initiative for building the monument is attributed to Karel Hartig, the first mayor of Žižkov.

In 1882, the Association for the Construction of the Žižka Monument in Žižkov was established in the hall of the U Deklarace pub. The Association held national celebrations in Žižkov (for instance in 1884) and in 1910 a memorial tablet was unveiled at the top of the hill. The Association's most high-profile act was the announcement of the tender for the Žižka Monument in 1912. No first prize was awarded. The Association's activities were abandoned during World War I.

== Establishment of the monument ==
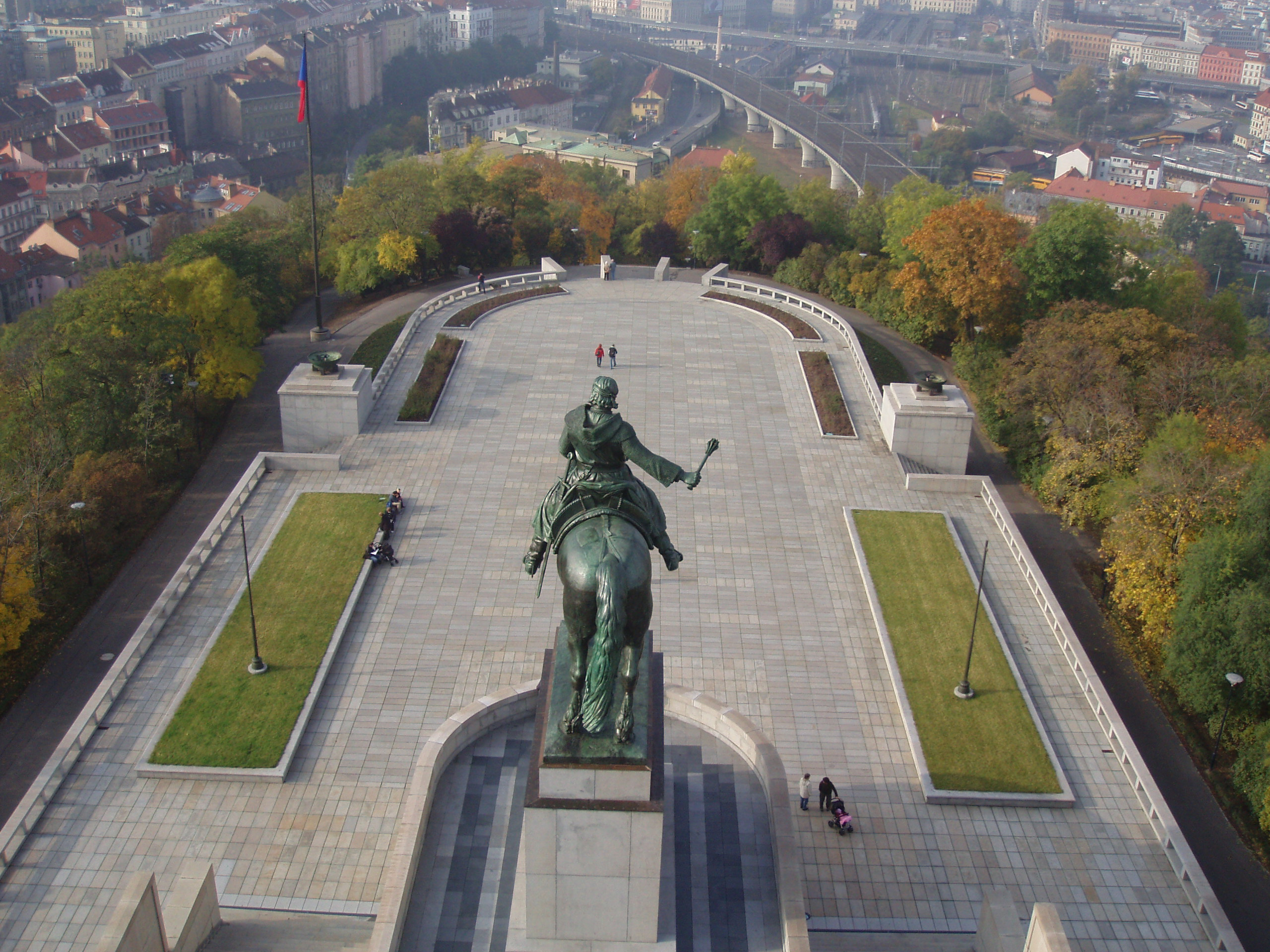
View from the Monument

In 1918 an independent Czechoslovak state was declared. The state consistently supported activities aimed at maintaining and developing the tradition of foreign legions. The Resistance Monument was established within the Ministry of National Defence in May 1919 as an institution whose role it was to collect written and material memorabilia relating to the resistance. In 1920 the Monument became a separate military institute, with colonel Rudolf Medek as commander. The objective of the Resistance Monument as an institution was to build a structure which would inspire celebration and reverence as well as historical research activities, such as including an archive, library and museum. At that time the Resistance Monument was already cooperating with the Association for the Construction of Žižka's Monument in Žižkov. The two institutions merged in 1926, establishing the Union for the Construction of the Liberation Monument and the Monument to Jan Žižka of Trocnov.

Two art contests were held for the design, the more significant being the second one in 1925, which assumed separate buildings for the Monument. The first building, located on Vítkov hill, was to be a necropolis for prominent representatives of the First Resistance, and the second building at the foot of the hill, now used by the Institute of Military History, was to house the administration and museum. The architect Jan Zazvorka won first prize in the contest.

The construction of the museum at the foot of the hill was launched in 1927 and completed two years later. The construction of the National Liberation Monument commenced in 1928 when the corner stone was laid on the top of Vítkov Hill in the presence of President T. G. Masaryk to mark the occasion of the 10th anniversary of the creation of Czechoslovakia. The shell was completed in 1933 and interior works continued, involving many leading artists.

== The monument during World War II ==
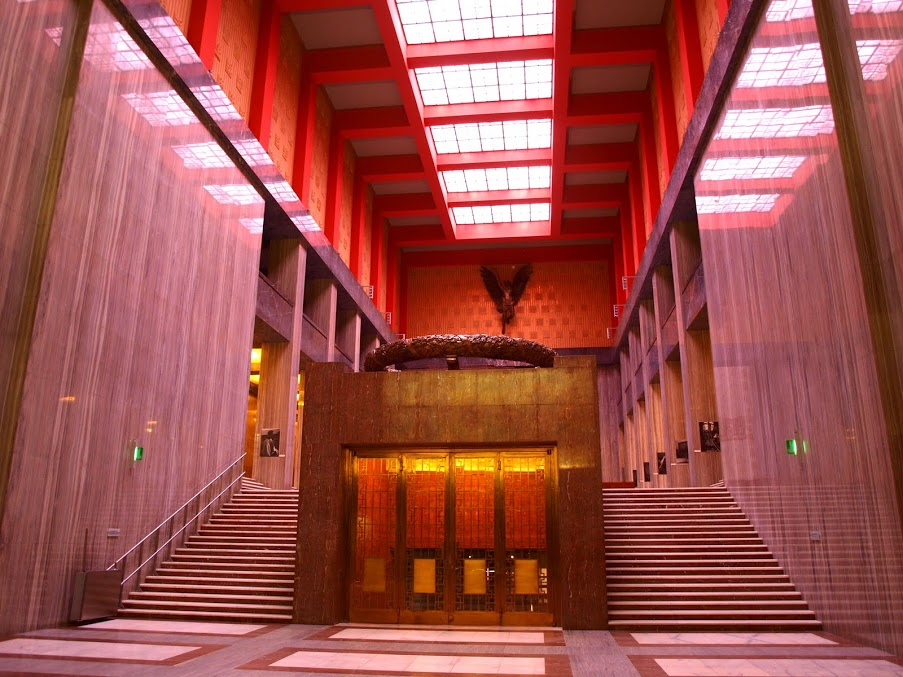
Monument interior

In 1938 the Monument was prepared to officially become state property, but this was precluded by the events following the Munich Conference. Thus the Monument remained property of the Union and the artwork decorations were not fully completed.

When World War II began, the lower buildings of the museum, now the Institute of Military History, were seized by the Germans. The Monument's building escaped the Wehrmacht's attention until November 1942. The administration of the Monument took advantage of this period to secretly remove everything valuable, such as metals for casting sculptures, and works of art. From November 1942 the Monument was occupied by the German administration and until the end of the war the Wehrmacht used it for storage.

== The Equestrian Statue of Jan Žižka of Trocnov ==
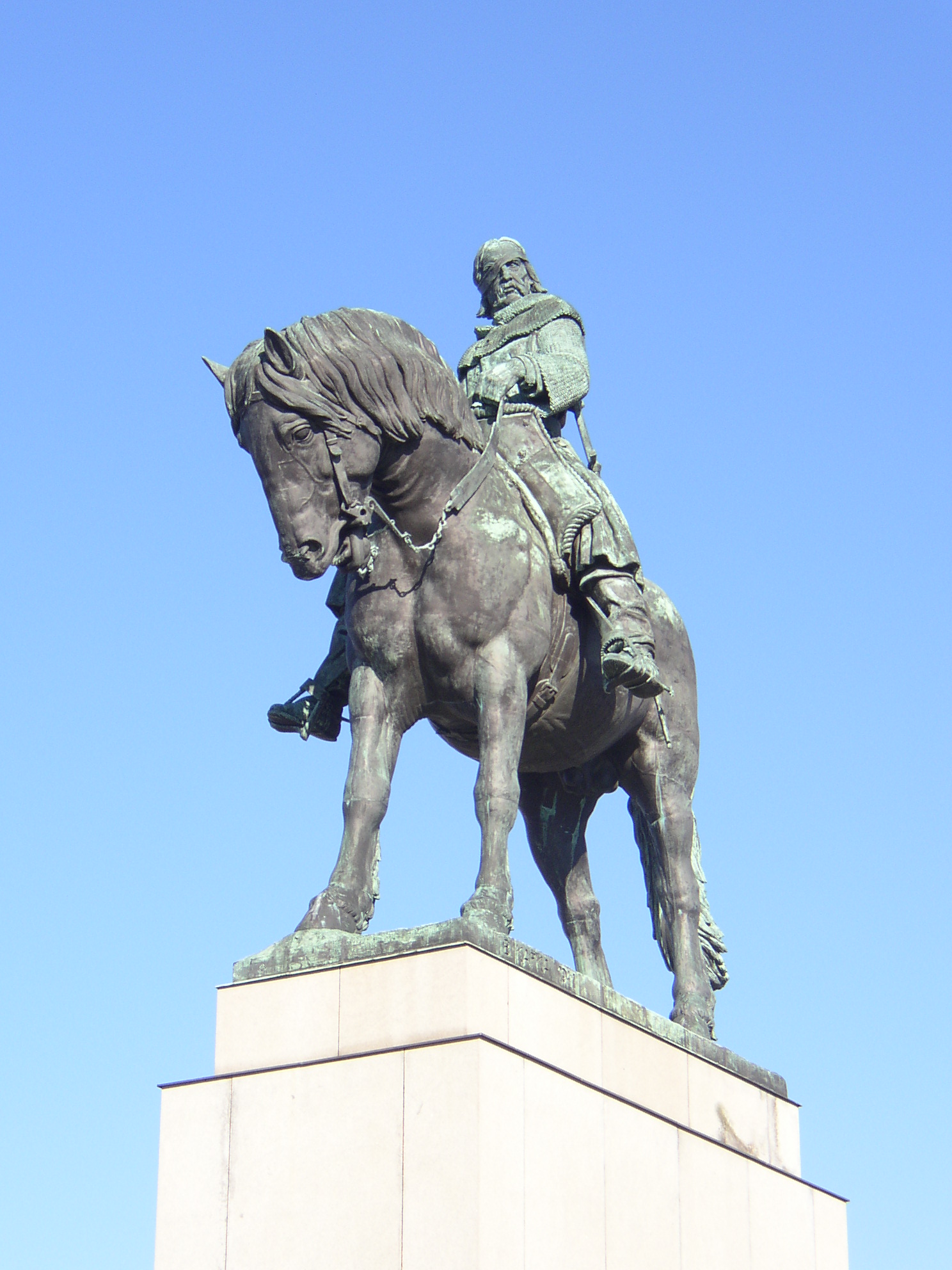
Equestrian statue of Jan Žižka

After the World War I, the activities of the Association for the Construction of Jan Žižka's Monument in Žižkov were renewed. As early as June 1920 the cornerstone was laid in the presence of President T. G. Masaryk. Art tenders were held in 1923, 1925 and 1928, with no satisfactory results.

The monument was eventually commissioned in 1931 from sculptor Bohumil Kafka, a professor at Prague's Academy of Visual Arts, outside the tender. The sculpture was intended to be monumental and realistic. It took Kafka ten years to complete the sculpture, and an advisory board of nine people was established to supervise his work, consisting of specialists, historians and hippologists. For this job, Bohumil Kafka had a new studio built in Ořechovka, Prague, 27m high and 18m wide. Firstly he began work on model of a horse without the rider. Several men then modelled for the rider part, conceiving the rider's position, body and head. Experts in historical armament provided information not only on the rider's clothing style, but also many other details, such as the design of the foot frame. Kafka made a plaster model of Žižka's statue in November 1941 and died shortly afterwards.

The sculpture was cast after the liberation of the country at the end of World War II. It was unveiled on 14 July 1950, to mark the anniversary of the Battle of Vítkov. It is tethered to reinforced concrete plugs anchored in the structure of the Monument. The sculpture is 9 metres (30 ft) high, 9.6 metres (31 ft) long, and weighs 16.5 tonnes (16.2 long tons; 18.2 short tons).

== Tomb of the Unknown Soldier ==
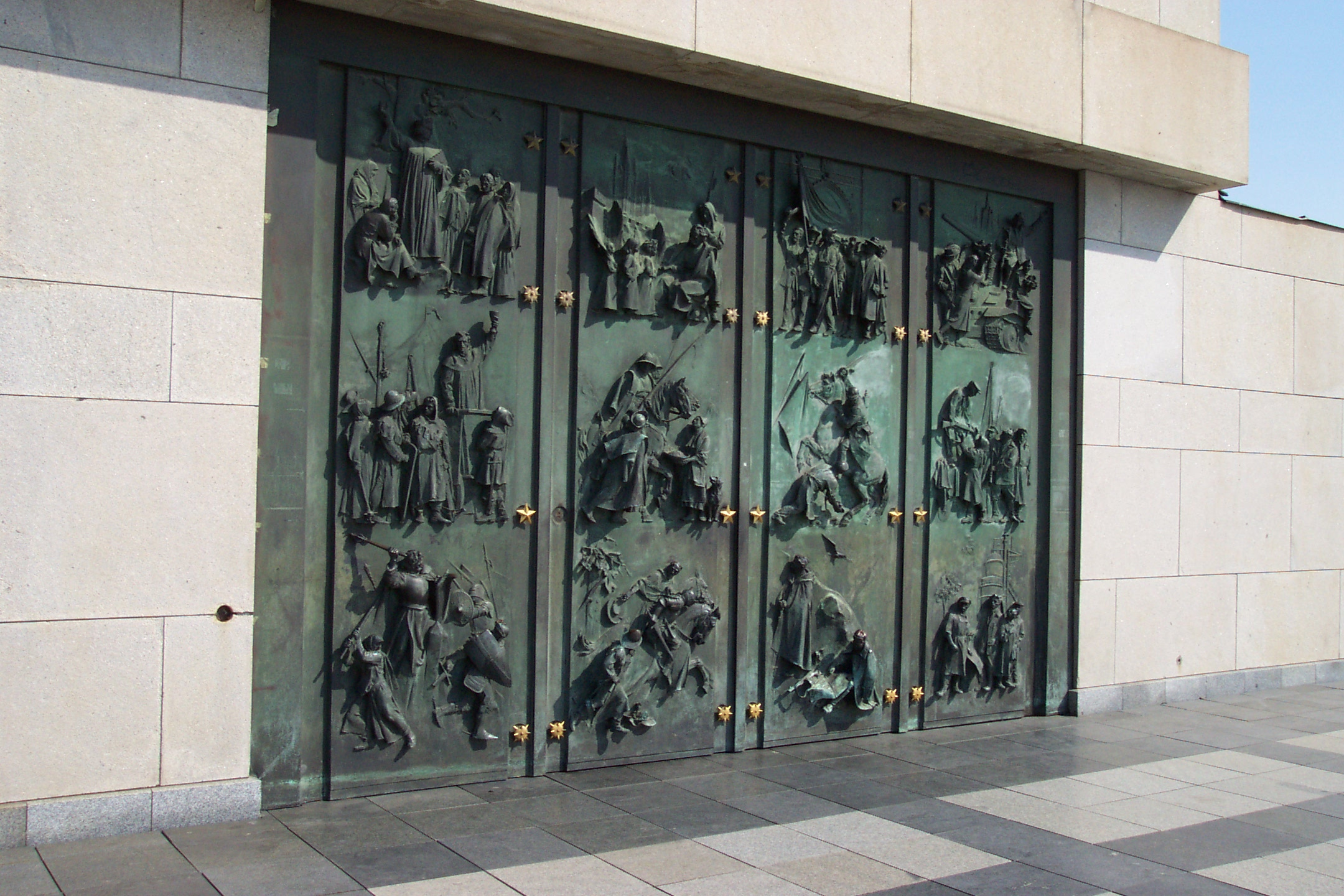
Detail of doors at the Monument

The Tomb of the Unknown Soldier is located underneath the Equestrian Statue. The Czechoslovak Tomb of the Unknown Soldier was originally established in the Old Town Hall in 1922 as a temporary place of piety and contained the remains of an unknown soldier from the Battle of Zborov. At the beginning of the Protectorate of Bohemia and Moravia in 1939, the Tomb became a place where people expressed their symbolic resistance against Nazi rule. It was demolished by the Nazis in 1941.

After World War II, consideration was given to renewing the tomb and moving it to Vítkov. As part of the 30th anniversary of the Battle of Zborov, the Headquarters of the Czechoslovak Army decided to establish the Tomb of the Unknown Soldier in the National Monument in Vítkov, which would contain the remains from Zborov, but Soviet embassy officials denied the transfer of those remains. In June 1949 restoration work was underway in the military graveyard near Dukla, and during exhumation work on 14 July 1949 the remains of one of the unknown soldiers were unearthed in the graveyard in Vyšný Komárnik. They were transported to Prague and temporarily lodged with the National Museum. On Sunday 9 October 1949, when celebrations of the 5th anniversary of the Battle of the Dukla Pass were at their peak, the remains were moved to the Liberation Monument.

On 8 May 2010 other remains of an unknown soldier from Zborov were put in the Tomb next to the unknown soldier from Dukla, thus fulfilling the original idea of the Monument. The remains are lodged in one of the coffins. The Tomb of the Unknown Soldier is today perceived as an expression of thanksgiving to the Czechs and Slovaks who fell in the struggle to liberate the Czech and Czechoslovak states. In 2006 General Alois Eliáš and his wife were also buried here.

== A Communist Pantheon ==
After World War II the renewal of the Monument commenced. Works also began on the new building, to be used as a tribute to the resistance against Nazism. However, the events of February 1948 led to the monument being used in new ways. Vigorous oppression of the legionary tradition commenced in 1950, and following a decision of the Central Committee of the Communist Party of Czechoslovakia, the Monument of Liberation was converted into a proletariat pantheon, thus changing its ideological function.

=== The Gottwald Mausoleum ===
In 1953 the Central Committee decided to establish a mausoleum for Klement Gottwald in the Monument, which remained there until 1962. The original layout had placed a sarcophagus in the Main Hall, which was intended for the burial of President T. G. Masaryk. Masaryk eventually rejected the plan to be buried there, and so did his family after his death.

In 1953, this area was rebuilt into the Klement Gottwald Mausoleum. The Minister of National Defence and Gottwald's son-in-law Alexej Čepička was in charge of preparatory works for the conversion. The examples came from Lenin's Mausoleum in Moscow and the Georgi Dimitrov Mausoleum in Sofia. The Mausoleum included technical facilities for embalming Gottwald's body. The construction work also involved the son of the Monument's key architect, Jan Zázvorka Jr., a film architect.

The technical facilities for the Klement Gottwald Mausoleum were built in the underground premises of the Monument. The construction of the underground premises was completed in October 1953. Klement Gottwald's body was exhibited in the centre of the Mausoleum in a glazed sarcophagus. The lid had built-in lights with small mirrors. The body was moved in and out of the underground laboratory by a vibration-free telescopic device. The embalmed body was dressed in the blue general's uniform of the Head Commander of Czechoslovak armies. In 1958 it was changed to civilian attire.

The Klement Gottwald Mausoleum and its original design lasted until Klement Gottwald's body was cremated in 1962 when the technical facilities for embalming were removed. The only elements of the original design preserved until today are the control room and the ground plan for the laboratory.

=== Urn burials until 1990 ===
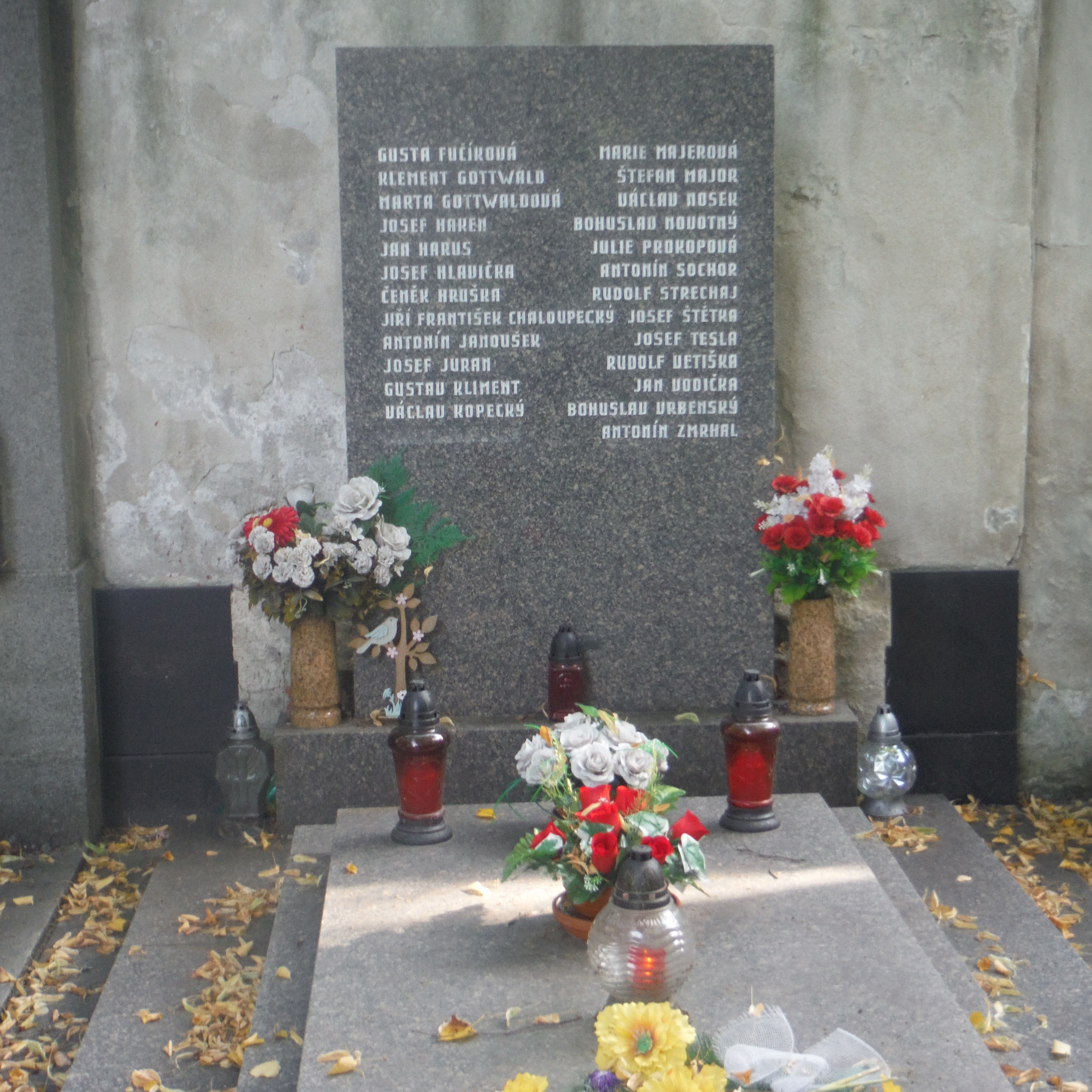
Olšany Cemetery, grave of Czech Communist politicians whose urns had originally been kept at the National Monument at Vítkov

After Gottwald's body was cremated in 1962, the funerary urn containing his ashes was returned to the National Monument and placed in the sarcophagus. His ashes remained in the National Monument until the Velvet Revolution. Other prominent members of the Communist Party of Czechoslovakia whose urns were displayed alongside Gottwald's in the National Monument were Gusta Fučiková, Marta Gottwaldová, Josef Haken, Jan Harus, Josef Hlavicka, Čeněk Hruška, Jiří František Chaloupecký, Antonín Janoušek, Josef Juran, Augustin Kliment, Václav Kopecký, Marie Majerová, Stefan Major, Václav Nosek, Bohuslav Novotný, Julie Prokopová, Antonín Sochor, Rudolf Strechaj, Josef Tesla, Rudolf Vetiska, Jan Vodička, Bohuslav Vrbenský and Antonín Zmrhal. In 1990, all these urns were removed and buried in a community grave at Olšany Cemetery.
