= Richard Sacher =

Czech politician

Czechoslovak Interior Minister
- In office 30 December 1989 – 27 June 1990
- Preceded by: František Pinc
- Succeeded by: Ján Langoš

Member of the Federal Assembly
- In office 7 June 1990 – 4 June 1992

Personal details
- Born: 1 September 1942 Úpice, Czechoslovakia
- Died: 27 February 2014 (aged 71) Červený Kostelec, Czech Republic
- Party: Czechoslovak People's Party

Richard Sacher (1 September 1942 – 27 February 2014) was a Czech politician and civil servant. He was the first post-Communist Interior Minister of Czechoslovakia for a year. He served from 1989 through 1990. He was also a member of the federal assembly for two years. In 2000, Sacher ran for the Senate, but lost the election.

Sacher died on 27 February 2014 in a hospice in Červený Kostelec, Czech Republic, aged 71.
