= Božena Machačová-Dostálová =

Czech politician (1903–1973)

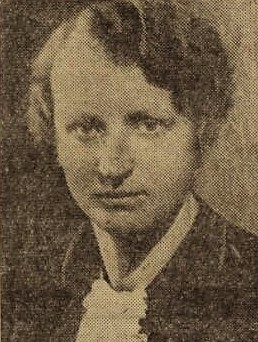
Machačová-Dostálová in 1946

Božena Machačová-Dostálová (25 September 1903 in Havlíčkův Brod – 20 May 1973 in Prague) was a Czech politician who was appointed Minister of Consumer Industry of Czechoslovakia in 1954.
