= Ludmila Jankovcová =

Czech politician (1897–1990)

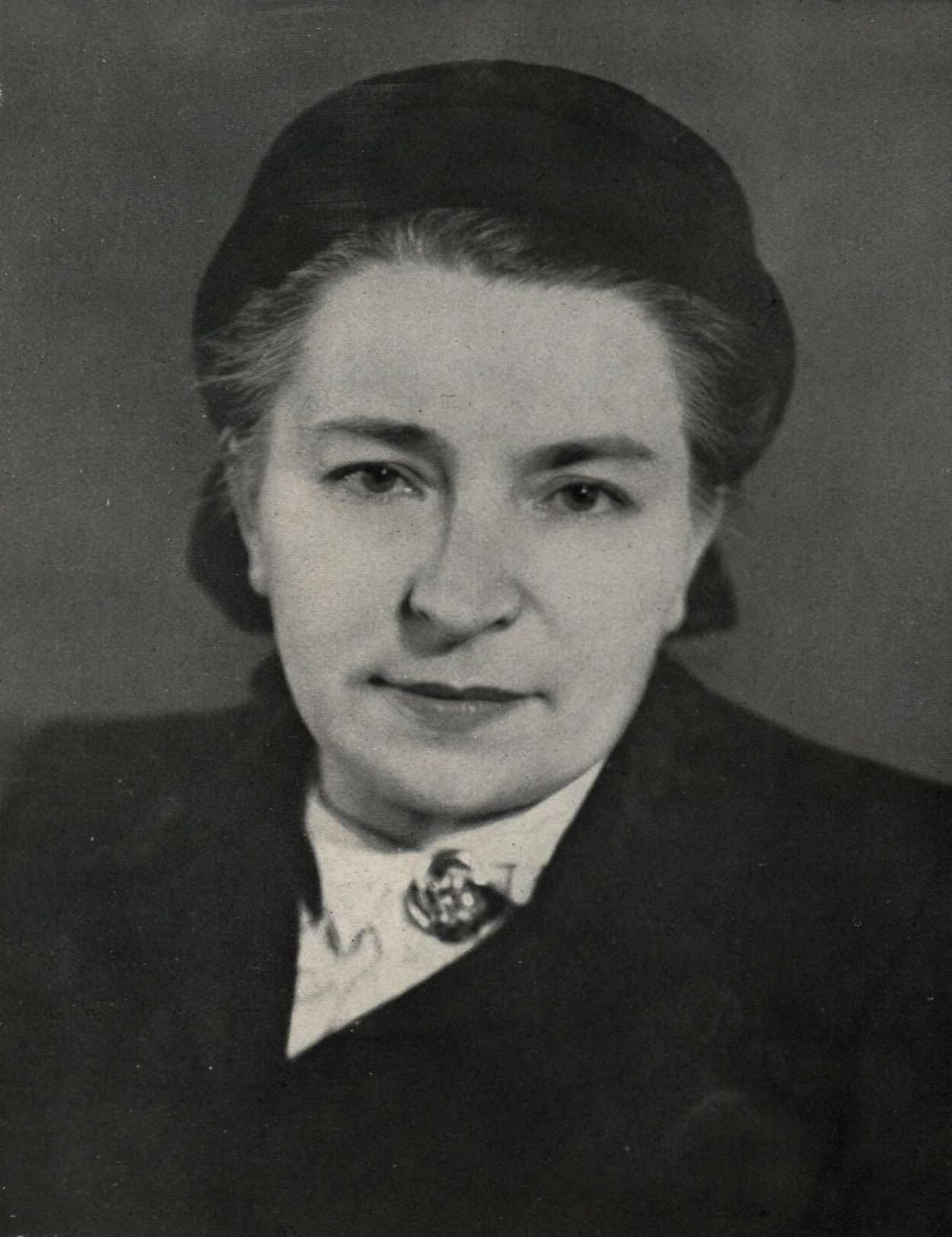
- Jankovcová in 1948

Deputy Prime Minister of Czechoslovakia
- In office 12 December 1954 – 20 September 1963
- Prime Minister: Viliam Široký

Minister of Food
- In office 25 February 1948 – 12 December 1954
- Prime Minister: Klement Gottwald (1948); Antonín Zápotocký (1948–1953); Viliam Široký (1953–1954)
- Preceded by: Václav Majer
- Succeeded by: Jindřich Uher

Minister of Industry
- In office 25 November 1947 – 25 February 1948
- Prime Minister: Klement Gottwald
- Preceded by: Bohumil Laušman
- Succeeded by: Zdeněk Fierlinger

Personal details
- Born: Ludmila Stračovská; 8 August 1897 Kutná Hora, Austria-Hungary
- Died: 5 September 1990 (aged 93) Plzeň or Prague, Czechoslovakia
- Party: Czechoslovak Social Democratic Workers' Party (1921–1948); Communist Party of Czechoslovakia (1948–1969)
- Spouse: Volfgang Jankovec

Ludmila Jankovcová (née Stračovská; 8 August 1897 – 5 September 1990) was a Czech politician.

== Biography ==
After finishing gymnasium in Kutná Hora, Jankovcová studied at the University of Commerce in Prague in 1919–1923. After graduating with a degree in engineering, she worked as a secondary school teacher. In 1921, she married Volfgang Jankovec, also a teacher. After the occupation of the Czech lands by Nazi Germany in 1939, the couple joined the anti-Nazi resistance. They were arrested by the Gestapo in 1941; Ludmila was sent to Ravensbrück concentration camp, while Volfgang was imprisoned and executed three years later. A member of the Czechoslovak Social Democratic Workers' Party (ČSSD) from 1922, Jankovcová entered national politics after World War II, serving as vice-president of the party and being elected a deputy to the Constituent National Assembly in 1946. A member of the party's left wing, she supported the merging of the ČSSD into the Communist Party of Czechoslovakia (KSČ) in 1948. From June 1948 until September 1963, she served as a member of the Central Committee of the KSČ, including as a member of the Political Bureau from June 1954.

From November 1947, Jankovcová served as Minister of Industry in Klement Gottwald's first government; in February 1948 she was appointed Minister of Food, and would remain in this position until December 1954. She then served as a Deputy Prime Minister under Viliam Široký until her retirement in 1963. After retiring, Jankovcová supported the reform movement within the KSČ, headed by Alexander Dubček, which culminated in the Prague Spring of 1968. She condemned the subsequent Warsaw Pact invasion of Czechoslovakia in August 1968, and was expelled from the KSČ in September 1969. She later supported the Czechoslovak dissident movement, and was one of the signatories of Charter 77 in January 1977.

== Honours and awards ==
- Order of the Republic, two times (7 May 1955; 1957)
- Order of Klement Gottwald (14 July 1967)
