= Jindřich Uher =

Czechoslovak politician

Member of the Constituent National Assembly
- In office 1946–1948

Member of National Assembly of Czechoslovakia
- In office 1948–1968

Member of the Federal Assembly
- In office 1969–1971

Deputy Chairman of the Council of Ministers
- In office 31 January 1953 – 12 December 1954

Minister of Agriculture of Czechoslovakia
- In office 14 September 1953 – 12 December 1954
- Preceded by: Josef Nepomucký
- Succeeded by: Marek Smida

Minister of Food Industry of Czechoslovakia
- In office 12 December 1954 – 23 June 1961
- Preceded by: Office established
- Succeeded by: Josef Krosnář

Minister of Internal Trade of Czechoslovakia
- In office 1961–1968
- Preceded by: Ladislav Brabec
- Succeeded by: Oldřich Pavlovský

Personal details
- Born: 18 June 1911 Předměřice nad Labem, Austria-Hungary
- Died: 26 July 1985 (aged 74) Prague, Czechoslovakia
- Political party: KSČ
- Spouse: Františka Tichá (Uhrová)
- Children: Miloslava Uhrová

Jindřich Uher (18 June 1911 – 26 July 1985) was a Czech and Czechoslovak politician affiliated with the Communist Party of Czechoslovakia. He played significant roles in various legislative bodies, including the Constituent National Assembly, National Assembly of Czechoslovakia, and the Federal Assembly. Additionally, Uher served as a minister in several Czechoslovak governments.

== Early life and background ==
Uher was born on 18 June 1911 in Předměřice nad Labem, Bohemia, Austria-Hungary. He hailed from a family of mechanical locksmiths, with his father being a founding member of the Communist Party of Czechoslovakia. Uher's early involvement in the workers' movement began at the age of seven when he joined the Proletarian Gymnastic Unions. In 1931, he became a member of the Communist Party and initially worked as a laborer in a musical instrument factory.

His original profession was a worker in a musical instrument factory in Hradec Králové. Already in the first half of the 1930s, however, he was mostly unemployed and supported himself by occasional work, for example as a carpenter. During the Nazi occupation, Uher actively participated in the resistance, leading to his arrest in June 1940 and an eight-year sentence.

== Political career in Czechoslovakia ==
Post-World War II, Uher ascended to prominent positions within the Communist Party. His party roles included membership in the Central Committee and holding the position of head secretary in Gottwaldov. He also served in various government capacities, such as deputy chairman and Minister of Agriculture in the government of Antonín Zápotocký and Viliam Široky. Uher further assumed the role of Minister of the Food Industry in the second and third governments of Viliam Široký, and Minister of Internal Trade in the government of Jozef Lenárt.

Uher's parliamentary career extended from the 1946 Constituent National Assembly to the 1968 elections. He continued his service in the National Assembly and later in the People's House of the Federal Assembly after the federalization of Czechoslovakia. Subsequently, Uher took on the role of the Czechoslovak ambassador in Kenya.

Recognized for his contributions, Jindřich Uher received honors such as the Order of 25 February and the Order of the Republic. He died on 26 July 1985 in Prague.
