= Alexej Čepička =

Czech politician and army general

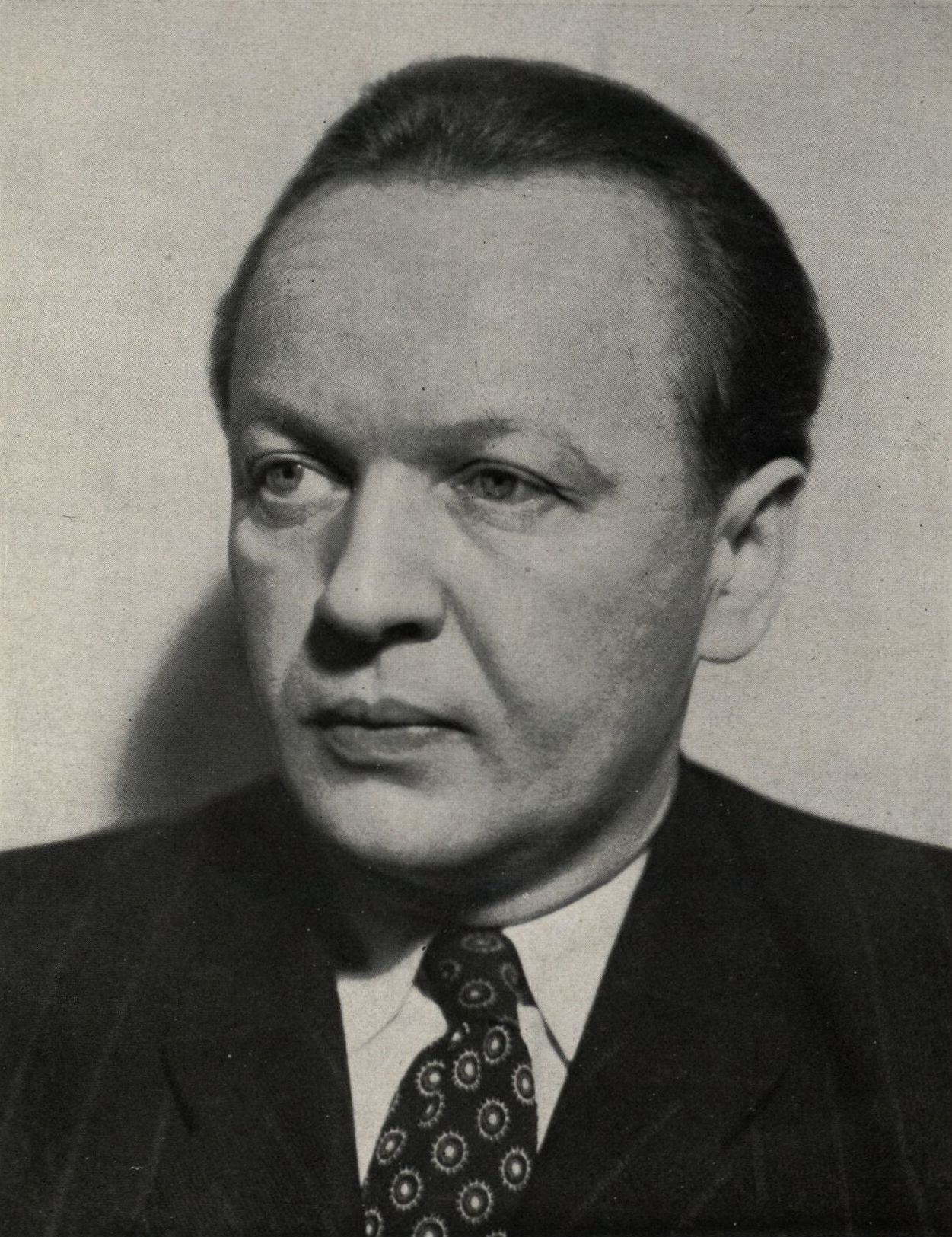
- Čepička in 1948

First Deputy Prime Minister of Czechoslovakia
- In office 14 September 1953 – 25 April 1956
- Prime Minister: Viliam Široký

Minister of National Defence
- In office 25 April 1950 – 25 April 1956
- Prime Minister: Antonín Zápotocký (1950–1953); Viliam Široký (1953–1956)
- Preceded by: Ludvík Svoboda
- Succeeded by: Bohumír Lomský

Minister of Justice
- In office 25 February 1948 – 25 April 1950
- Prime Minister: Klement Gottwald (1948); Antonín Zápotocký (1948–1950)
- Preceded by: Prokop Drtina
- Succeeded by: Štefan Rais

Minister of Domestic Trade
- In office 3 December 1947 – 25 February 1948
- Prime Minister: Klement Gottwald
- Preceded by: Antonín Zmrhal
- Succeeded by: František Krajčir

Personal details
- Born: 18 August 1910 Kroměříž, Moravia, Austria-Hungary
- Died: 30 October 1990 (aged 80) Dobříš, Czechoslovakia
- Party: Communist Party of Czechoslovakia
- Spouse: Marta Čepičková
- Education: Faculty of Law, Charles University
- Awards: Order of Klement Gottwald; Czechoslovak War Cross 1939–1945

Military service
- Allegiance: Czechoslovakia
- Branch/service: Czechoslovak Army
- Rank: General of the Army

Alexej Čepička (18 August 1910 – 30 September 1990) was a Czech communist politician and general of the Czechoslovak Army. He held several ministerial positions in Czechoslovakia after World War II, including Minister of Justice from 1948 to 1950 and Minister of National Defence from 1950 to 1956.

== Early years ==
Čepička was born to the family of a civil servant in Kroměříž. He matriculated from gymnasium in Kroměříž in 1929, and then moved to Prague, where he was admitted to the Faculty of Law at Charles University. In Prague, he also joined the Communist Party of Czechoslovakia (KSČ), and worked as a functionary of the Young Communist League of Czechoslovakia from 1932 to 1935. Čepička obtained a doctorate in law in 1935, and then worked at a law firm in Brno.

After the start of World War II and the occupation of the Czech lands by Nazi Germany, he became involved with the anti-Nazi resistance, which led to his arrest by the Gestapo in 1942. Čepička was at first held in Auschwitz, and then in Buchenwald, where he remained until the end of the war.

== Political career ==
After being liberated from Buchenwald, Čepička returned to his hometown of Kroměříž, where he headed the city administration between 1945 and 1946. From June 1946 until May 1948, he represented the KSČ in the Constituent National Assembly. Around this time, Čepička also married Marta Gottwaldova (1920–1998), the daughter of KSČ Chairman Klement Gottwald, who would soon become Prime Minister and then President.

At the end of 1947, Čepička joined the government as Minister for Domestic Trade. After the coup d'état of February 1948, he became Minister of Justice; in this position, he introduced a number of reforms of the Czechoslovak judicial system and legal acts aimed at securing the political power of the KSČ. Between 1949 and 1950, Čepička also headed the State Office for Church Affairs, and between 1951 and 1954, he was a member of the Presidium, the Political Secretariat and the Political Bureau of the Central Committee of the KSČ. He belonged to the so called "big seven" of party and state leaders, along with President Gottwald, Prime Minister Antonín Zápotocký, Central Committee Secretary Antonín Novotný, Minister of the Interior Václav Nosek, Minister of Foreign Affairs Viliam Široký and Minister of Information Václav Kopecký.

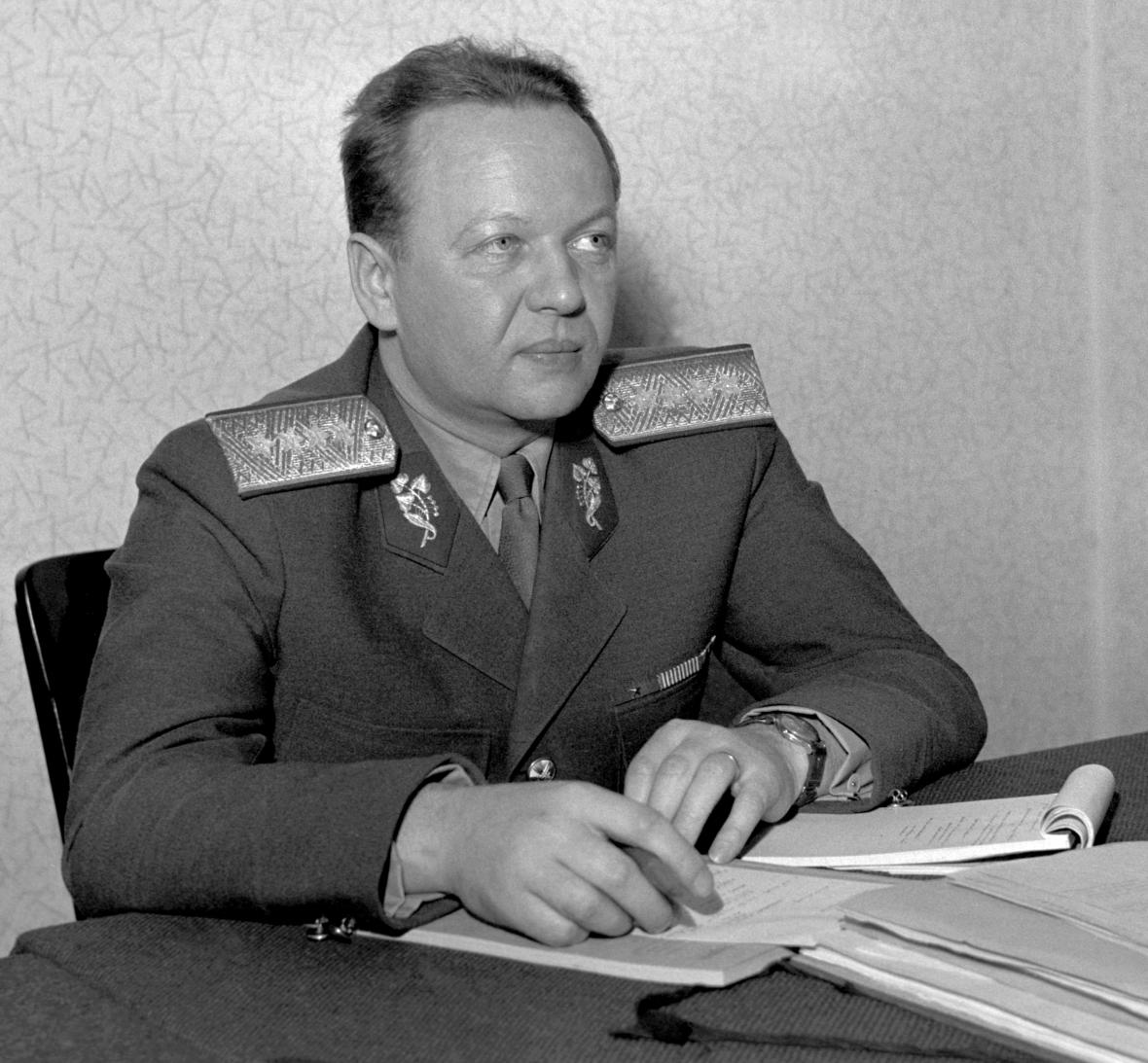
Čepička in March 1951

Čepička served as Minister of Justice until 1950, when he replaced Ludvík Svoboda as Minister of National Defence. In this position, he led a radical reorganization and expansion of the Czechoslovak Army: in 1950, a decision was taken to expand the strength of the army in peacetime from 170 000 to 250 000 men, and to 700 000 in times of war. The army administration was also restructured and modelled after the Soviet Army, and in 1954, the Czechoslovak Army was officially renamed the Czechoslovak People's Army. A large-scale redeployment of military units along the western border of Czechoslovakia also took place; according to historian Karel Kaplan, Čepička was personally ordered by Joseph Stalin to prepare the Czechoslovak Army for an incursion into Western Europe in case of a possible military confrontation.

As Minister of Defence, Čepička proposed the construction of the Hotel International Prague, and envisioned a monument to the newly formed Fourth Czechoslovak Republic that would reinforce ties with the Soviet Union.

== Downfall and later years ==
After the deaths of Stalin and Gottwald in 1953, the prospect of immediate war lessened and Čepička's position became precarious. Other leaders of the KSČ were afraid of his political ambitions, and rumours of him being homosexual did not help his popularity. In his book Špión vypovídá, defector Josef Frolík stated that Minister of the Interior Rudolf Barák had Čepička followed on one occasion, and that he was caught in Prague's Letná Park talking to a young man. Čepička was selected as a scapegoat for the cult of personality around Gottwald, dismissed from all functions in 1956, and put into low importance position as head of the State Office for Inventions and Standardization. In 1959 he suffered a heart attack and was sent into comfortable retirement.

Continuing liberalisation of political life made Čepička a symbol of the past wrongs, and in 1963 he was expelled from the KSČ altogether for his role in the "deformations of the 50s". Čepička never entered politics again, and spent the rest of his life in retirement. He died, forgotten, at a nursing home in Dobříš in 1990.

== In fiction ==
In 1969 Miroslav Švandrlík wrote Black Barons (Czech: Černí baroni), a satirical book officially published in 1990, after the fall of the Communist Party from power. The book and its sequels became popular and were followed by a film and TV series. The book subtitle "We waged war under Čepička" reminds us of the then Minister of Defense Alexej Čepička. One of the main characters in the book, major Terazky, is shown as a comical character, hopelessly trying to turn stupid army officers and bored conscripts into feared warriors, and this image of him as a clown underscores the absurdity of the socialist army.

== Awards and honours ==
=== Czechoslovak honours ===
- Order of Klement Gottwald (7 May 1955)

== Literature ==
- Karel Kaplan, Dans les Archives du comité central: Trente ans de secrets du bloc soviétique, Paris: Michel, 1978, pp. 165-66; ISBN 2-226-00711-3
- Jiří Pernes, Jaroslav Pospíšil, Antonín Lukáš: Alexej Čepička - Šedá eminence rudého režimu (Alexej Čepička - the Grey Eminence of the Red regime), Prague, 2008, ISBN 978-80-7243-322-3.

Government offices
Preceded by Ludvík Svoboda	Minister of Defence of Czechoslovakia; 1950–1956	Succeeded by Bohumír Lomský
