= Ministry of the Interior (Czechoslovakia) =

Czechoslovak government ministry responsible for internal affairs

- Czech: Ministerstvo vnitra Slovak: Ministerstvo vnútra

Ministry overview
- Formed: 14 November 1918; 107 years ago
- Dissolved: 31 December 1992; 33 years ago
- Jurisdiction: Czechoslovakia
- Headquarters: Prague, Czechoslovakia
- Ministers responsible: Antonín Švehla, first Minister of the Interior; Petr Čermák, last Minister of the Interior

The Ministry of the Interior of Czechoslovakia refers to the internal affairs ministry which was responsible for interior of Czechoslovakia during its existence, from 1918 to 1992.

== List of ministers ==
=== First Czechoslovak Republic (1918–1938) ===
No.	Portrait	Minister	Took office	Left office	Time in office	Party
1	Antonín Švehla	Antonín Švehla (1873–1933)	14 November 1918	15 September 1920	1 year, 306 days	RSZML
2	Jan Černý	Jan Černý (1874–1959)	15 September 1920	7 October 1922	2 years, 22 days	Independent
3	Jan Malypetr	Jan Malypetr (1873–1947)	7 October 1922	9 December 1925	3 years, 63 days	RSZML
4	František Nosek [cs]	František Nosek (1886–1935)	9 December 1925	18 March 1926	99 days	ČSL
(2)	Jan Černý	Jan Černý (1874–1959)	18 March 1926	7 December 1929	3 years, 264 days	Independent
5	Juraj Slávik [cs]	Juraj Slávik (1890–1969)	7 December 1929	29 October 1932	2 years, 327 days	RSZML
(2)	Jan Černý	Jan Černý (1874–1959)	29 October 1932	14 February 1934	1 year, 108 days	Independent
6	Josef Černý [cs]	Josef Černý (1885–1971)	14 February 1934	22 September 1938	4 years, 220 days	RSZML

=== Second Czechoslovak Republic (1938–1939) ===
No.	Portrait	Minister	Took office	Left office	Time in office	Party
1	Jan Černý	Jan Černý (1874–1959)	22 September 1938	1 December 1938	70 days	Independent
2	Otakar Fischer [cs]	Otakar Fischer (1884–1968)	1 December 1938	15 March 1939	104 days	SNJ

=== Czechoslovak government-in-exile (1940–1945) ===
No.	Portrait	Minister	Took office	Left office	Time in office	Party
1	Juraj Slávik [cs]	Juraj Slávik (1890–1969)	21 July 1940	5 April 1945	4 years, 258 days	RSZML

=== Third Czechoslovak Republic (1945–1948) ===
No.	Portrait	Minister	Took office	Left office	Time in office	Party
1	Václav Nosek	Václav Nosek (1892–1955)	5 April 1945	25 February 1948	2 years, 326 days	KSČ

=== Czechoslovak Socialist Republic (1948–1989) ===
No.	Portrait	Minister	Took office	Left office	Time in office	Party
1	Václav Nosek	Václav Nosek (1892–1955)	25 February 1948	14 September 1953	5 years, 201 days	KSČ
2	Rudolf Barák [cs]	Rudolf Barák (1915–1995)	14 September 1953	23 June 1961	7 years, 282 days	KSČ
3	Lubomír Štrougal	Lubomír Štrougal (1924–2023)	23 June 1961	23 April 1965	3 years, 304 days	KSČ
4	Josef Kudrna [cs]	Josef Kudrna (1920–1989)	23 April 1965	15 March 1968	2 years, 327 days	KSČ
5	Josef Pavel	Josef Pavel (1908–1973)	15 March 1968	31 August 1968	169 days	KSČ
6	Jan Pelnář [cs]	Jan Pelnář (1911–1982)	31 August 1968	28 January 1970	1 year, 150 days	KSČ
7	Radko Kaska [cs]	Radko Kaska (1928–1973)	28 January 1970	28 February 1973 †	3 years, 31 days	KSČ
8	Jaromír Obzina [cs]	Jaromír Obzina (1929–2003)	30 March 1973	20 June 1983	10 years, 82 days	KSČ
9	Vratislav Vajnar [cs]	Vratislav Vajnar (1930–2023)	20 June 1983	11 October 1988	5 years, 113 days	KSČ
10	František Kincl [cs]	František Kincl (born 1941)	12 October 1988	3 December 1989	1 year, 52 days	KSČ
11	František Pinc [cs]	František Pinc (born 1944)	3 December 1989	10 December 1989	7 days	KSČ

=== Czech and Slovak Federative Republic (1989–1992) ===
No.	Portrait	Minister	Took office	Left office	Time in office	Party
1	Richard Sacher	Richard Sacher (1942–2014)	30 December 1989	27 June 1990	179 days	ČSL
2	Ján Langoš	Ján Langoš (1946–2006)	27 June 1990	2 July 1992	2 years, 5 days	DS
3	Petr Čermák [cs]	Petr Čermák (born 1953)	2 July 1992	31 December 1992	182 days	ODS

== See also ==
- Ministry of the Interior (Czech Republic)
- Ministry of the Interior (Slovakia)
