= Josef Plojhar =

Czech-Czechoslovak priest and politician (1902–1981)

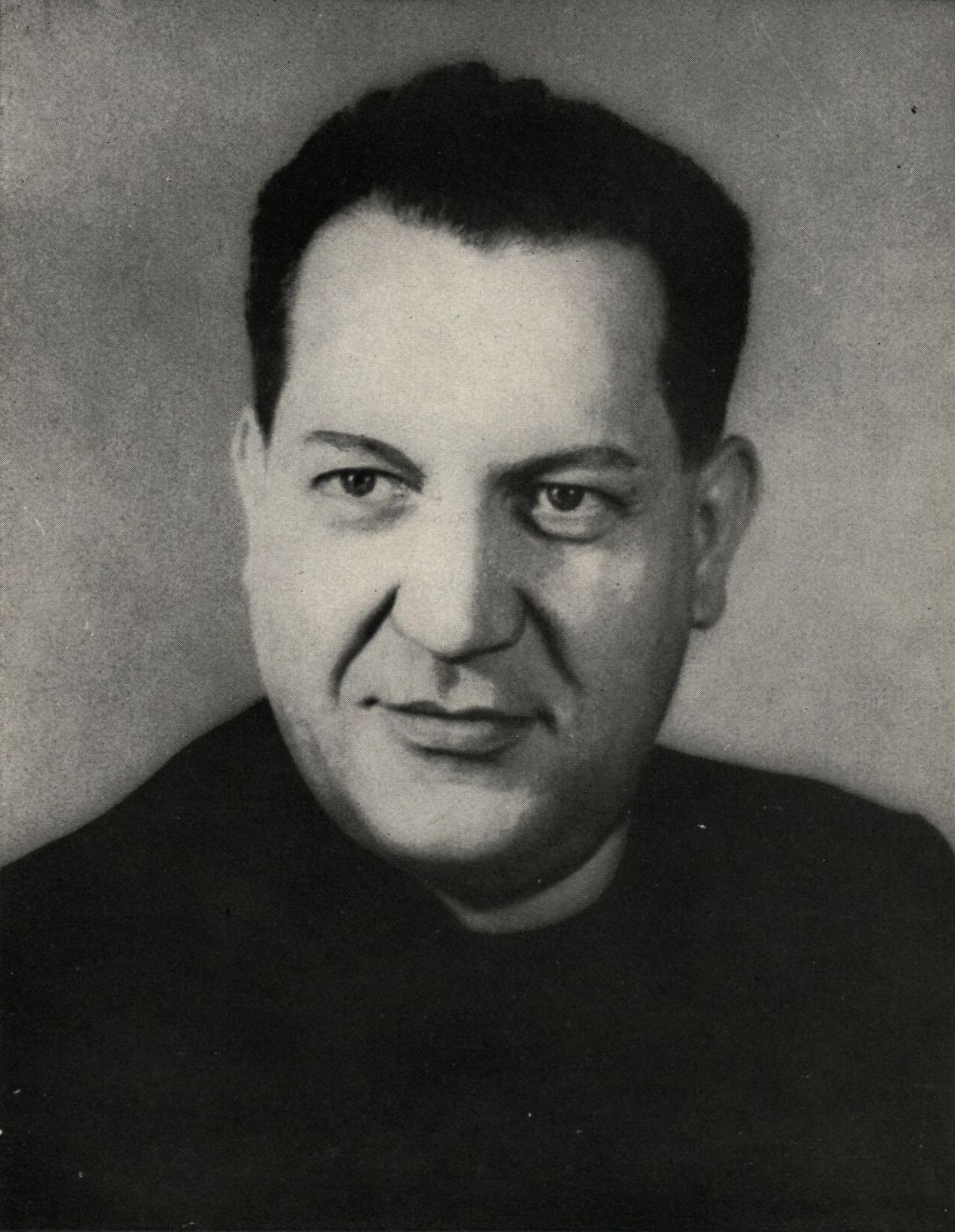
- Plojhar in 1948

Minister of Health
- In office 25 February 1948 – 8 April 1968
- Prime Minister: Klement Gottwald (1948); Antonín Zápotocký (1948–1953); Viliam Široký (1953–1963); Jozef Lenárt (1963–1968)
- Preceded by: Adolf Procházka
- Succeeded by: Vladislav Vlček

Personal details
- Born: 2 March 1902 České Budějovice, Austria-Hungary
- Died: 5 November 1981 (aged 79) Prague, Czechoslovakia
- Party: Czechoslovak People's Party

Josef Plojhar (2 March 1902 – 5 November 1981) was a Czech and Czechoslovak Roman Catholic priest and politician. He served as Minister of Health between 1948 and 1968, and also chaired the Peace Movement of Catholic Priests from 1948 to 1968.

== Biography ==
Plojhar was born in České Budějovice to a German-Czech family. He received his secondary education at a German gymnasium in his hometown and was active in German student associations; his nationality was also listed as German when he was ordained a priest. Plojhar considered himself to be of Czech nationality from the early 1930s, when he joined the Czechoslovak People's Party (ČSL).

After being ordained to priesthood in 1925, Plojhar started working in the administration of the Diocese of České Budějovice. Until 1939, he was a chaplain in the Cathedral of St. Nicholas in České Budějovice, and from March of that year in an administrative position of the parish of Rudolfov. He also wrote several works on religion, including a treatise on the stigmatic Therese Neumann shortly after his ordination, and in 1930 a pamphlet on the International Eucharistic Congress in Carthage, which he attended. After World War II, he produced several theological works on the relationship between Catholicism and communism.

After the occupation of the Czech lands by Nazi Germany in 1939, Plojhar was arrested by the Germans; from September 1939 until 1945, he was imprisoned in the concentration camps Buchenwald and Dachau. After liberation, he shortly resumed work as a priest in České Budějovice before being elected to the Interim National Assembly for the ČSL; he remained a deputy of the succeeding Constituent National Assembly, and then of the National Assembly, until 1960.

In the post-war period, Plojhar emerged as a leader of the left wing of the ČSL, supporting cooperation with the Communist Party of Czechoslovakia (KSČ). After being expelled from the ČSL by the right-wing majority, he and other members of the left-wing faction took control of the party secretariat and reorganized it, openly aligning it with the KSČ. After the coup d'état in February 1948, Plojhar was appointed Minister of Health in Klement Gottwald's government; he would retain this position in several governments until 1968, making him the longest-serving minister in the history of Czechoslovakia. As a Catholic priest, Plojhar was also active in establishing and heading an organization of ”progressive priests”. The organization existed in several forms and names; first as the Movement of Catholic Priests between 1948 and 1951, and then as the National Committee of Catholic Priests and finally the Peace Movement of Catholic Priests between 1951 and 1968. In response, Plojhar was excommunicated by the Holy See in the summer of 1949. In addition, Plojhar served as vice-president in 1948–1951 and then as president in 1951–1968 of the ČSL, and as vice-president of the Association of Czechoslovak–Soviet Friendship in 1952–1970.

During the Prague Spring in 1968, Plojhar was removed from his position as Minister of Health, as well as from his position as president of the ČSL. After the Warsaw Pact invasion of Czechoslovakia and the following period of normalization, he again became president of the ČSL on an honorary basis, and also came to serve as a deputy to the Chamber of the People of the Federal Assembly from 1971 until his death. Plojhar died during a reception at the Soviet embassy in Prague in celebration of the anniversary of the October Revolution in 1981. Cardinal František Tomášek, at the time Archbishop of Prague, was offered to conduct a Catholic ceremony for Plojhar, but refused; the ceremony was conducted by another Catholic priest.

== Honours and awards ==
=== Czechoslovak honours ===
- Order of Klement Gottwald, two times (7 May 1955; 2 March 1962)

=== Foreign honours ===
- (Polish People's Republic) Grand Cross of the Order of Polonia Restituta (1948)
