= Ladislav Štoll =

Czech politician and literary theorist (1902–1981)

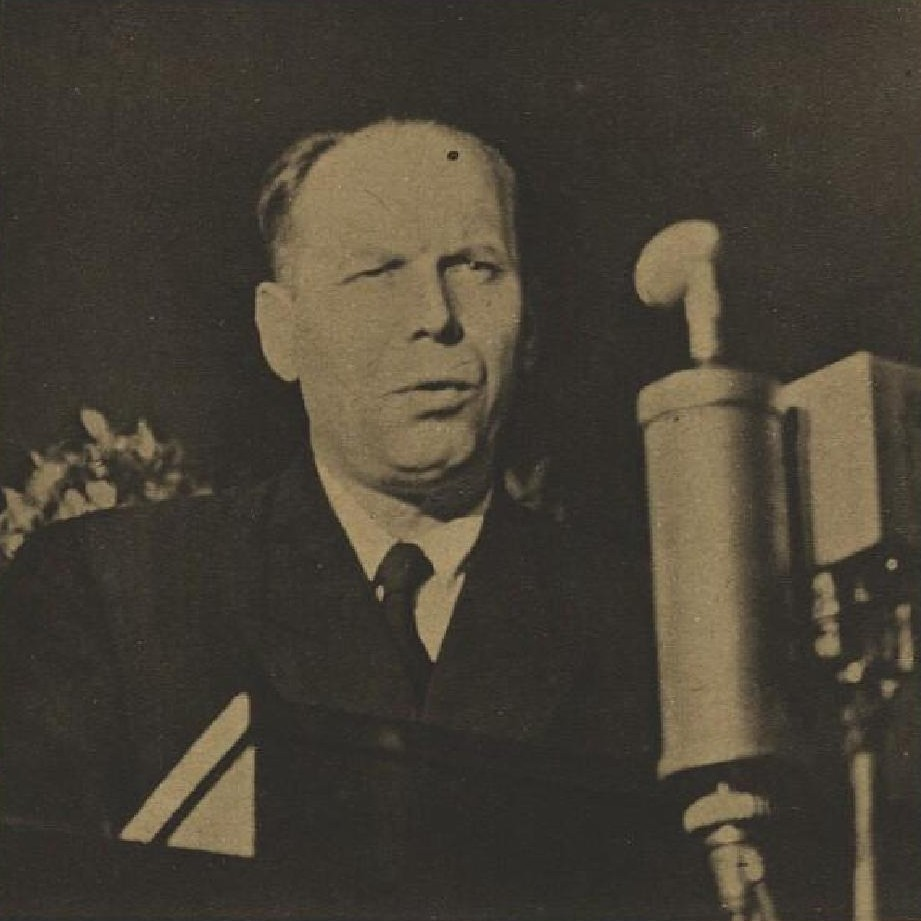

Minister of Information of Education
- In office 14 September 1952 – 12 December 1954
- Preceded by: Ernest Sýkora
- Succeeded by: František Kahuda

Minister of Culture of Czechoslovakia
- In office 1954–1960
- Preceded by: Václav Kopecký
- Succeeded by: František Kahuda

Personal details
- Born: 26 June 1902 Jablonec nad Nisou, Austria Hungary
- Died: 6 January 1981 (aged 78) Prague, Czechoslovakia (now Czech Republic)
- Party: Communist Party of Czechoslovakia
- Occupation: Literary and art scholar, literary and art critic, journalist, writer
- Awards: Order of the Republic; Order of the Victorious February

Ladislav Štoll (26 June 1902 – 6 January 1981) was a Czech Marxist literary and art theorist, political activist and statesman. One of the leading cultural ideologues of Socialist Czechoslovakia, he promoted the Socialist realist stance in art and literature.

== Biography ==
Śtoll was born in to a middle-class family. His father Emil died in the First World War. He became a member of the Communist Party in 1929.

From 1930, he attended the lectures of František Xaver Šalda and Zdeněk Nejedlý at the Faculty of Philosophy of Charles University. He worked in Prague at the Živnostenská Banka as an official, from where he was dismissed in 1931 for his articles in the Left Front and promotion of communism among other bank officials. After his release, he became a full-time journalist and began to devote himself to literary criticism.

He was a leading member of the Left Front and responsible editor of the magazine of the same name. From 1934 he was the editor of Rudé právo. In 1934, he was sent by the party to Moscow as a translator of Marx and Engels' writings from German; where he stayed with his family in Moscow until 1936.

With Julius Fučík, he participated in the Czech broadcast of Moscow Radio. He participated in the mobilization as a lieutenant of the bombing squadron detached in Horní Počernice. During the occupation of Czechoslovakia, he worked in the Joint Stock Company for Corn Processing (1939–1945), participated in issuing illegal Rude pravo newspapers, for which he was investigated by the Gestapo several times in 1944.

After the liberation, Štoll quick became one of the most powerful cultural figures in Czechoslovakia. In 1947, he became vice-chairman of the Cultural Unity, which united the cultural and artistic community. In April 1948, he was one of the main speakers at the Congress of National Culture. In 1950, he published the fundamental ideological work "Thirty Years of Struggle for Czech Socialist Poetry". In 1953 he was Czechoslovak Minister for Higher Education and from 1954 to 1960 Minister for Culture. As rector of the Institute for Social Sciences, which was subordinate to the Central Committee of the KSČ from 1957 to 1961.

Štoll was head of the commission of the creation of the Czechoslovak Academy of Sciences. From 1956 he was a corresponding member of the CSAV and from 1960 an academician.

From 1960 onwards, Štoll's position within the party began to weaken however he was still actively involved in banning some literary works. In the years 1962–1968, he headed the Institute for Czech and World Literature of the Czechoslovak Academy of Sciences. After the failure of the Prague Spring, he was significantly involved in normalization in culture and social sciences.

In 1972, he was again appointed director of the Institute for Czech and World Literature of the Czechoslovak Academy of Sciences, a position he held until his death.

== Works ==
In the interwar period, Štoll initially wrote fiction, but from 1928 he devoted himself to literary criticism and journalism subordinated to the interests of the Communist Party.

- Člověk v aeroplánu, 1927
- Otrávený chléb, 1929
- Politika a světový názor, 1946
- Skutečnosti tváří v tvář, 1948
- Třicet let bojů za českou socialistickou poesii, 1950
- Veliký člověk Maxim Gorkij, 1951 projev vydáno i knižně
- Literatura a kulturní revoluce 1959
- Z bojů na levé frontě, 1964
- O tvar a strukturu v slovesném umění, 1966
- Umění a ideologický boj., dva díly první do r. 1959 a druhý do 1971
- O modernosti a modernismu v umění, 1974
- Socialismus a osobnosti, 1974
- Básník a naděje, 1975
- Občan F. X. Šalda, 1977
- K dějinám politických ideologií v období renesance, 1983
- Z kulturních zápasů, 1986
