= Václav Nosek =

Czech politician, Minister of Interior of Czechoslovakia

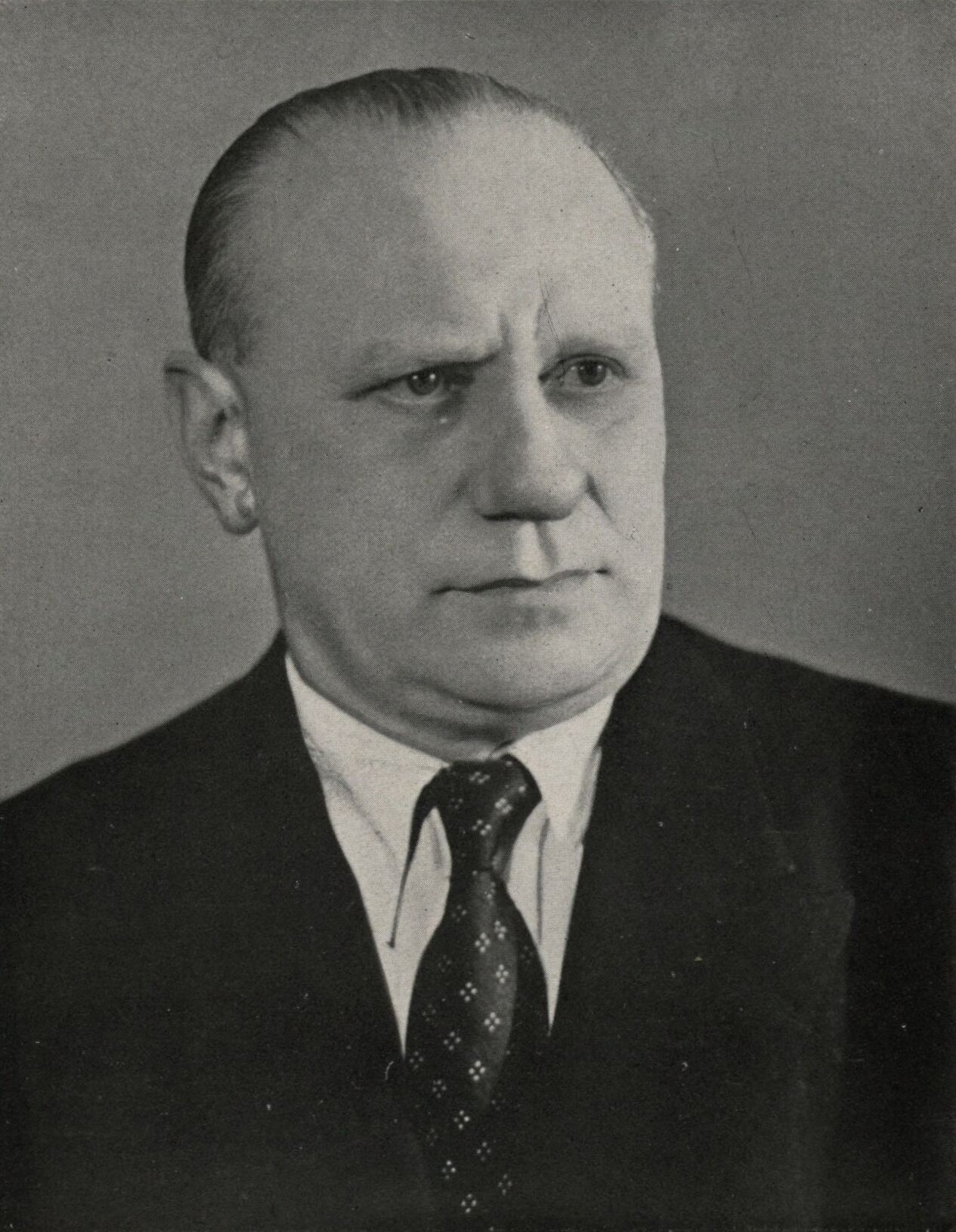
- Nosek in 1948

Minister of Labour and Social Welfare
- In office 14 September 1953 – 22 July 1955
- Prime Minister: Viliam Široký
- Preceded by: Jaroslav Havelka
- Succeeded by: Josef Tesla

Minister of the Interior
- In office 4 April 1945 – 14 September 1953
- Prime Minister: Zdeněk Fierlinger (1945–1946); Klement Gottwald (1946–1948); Antonín Zápotocký (1948–1953); Viliam Široký (1953)
- Preceded by: Juraj Slávik
- Succeeded by: Rudolf Barák

Personal details
- Born: 26 September 1892 Velká Dobrá, Bohemia, Austria-Hungary
- Died: 22 July 1955 (aged 62) Prague, Czechoslovakia
- Party: Communist Party of Czechoslovakia (1921–1955)
- Other political affiliations: Czechoslovak Social Democratic Party (1910–1921)

Václav Nosek (26 September 1892 – 22 July 1955) was a Czech communist politician who served as Minister of the Interior of Czechoslovakia from 4 April 1945 to 14 September 1953.

== Biography ==
The son of a miner, Nosek joined the Czechoslovak Social Democratic Workers' Party (ČSSD) at the age of eighteen and was an active trade unionist. He served in the Austro-Hungarian Army during World War I, and fought during the Serbian campaign and on the Eastern and Italian fronts, before being wounded and discharged in 1917. Belonging to the left wing of the ČSSD, Nosek took part in the party split and the subsequent founding of the Communist Party of Czechoslovakia (KSČ) in 1921. During the 1920s he worked as an organizer of the communist trade unions in Prague, and in 1929 he was elected to the Central Committee of the KSČ.

After the occupation of the Czech lands by Nazi Germany in 1939, Nosek was arrested and jailed in Prague's Pankrác Prison for several weeks. Upon his release, he emigrated to the United Kingdom via Poland and Sweden, where he would remain during World War II. He was one of the few Communists who spent the war in the United Kingdom; most of his KSČ colleagues spent the war in the Soviet Union. Czechoslovak non-Communists considered him one of the "good" Communists. From 1941 he was a member, and from 1942 vice chairman, of the London-based Czechoslovak National Council, led by Edvard Beneš.

On 4 April 1945, Nosek was named Minister of the Interior in Zdeněk Fierlinger's government, which was formed in Košice during the retreat of the German forces; he would retain this post in several governments until 1953. As Minister of the Interior, Nosek was a central figure in the 1948 Czechoslovak coup d'etat, using his position to place supporters and members of the KSČ on high positions within the National Security Service (SNB). In early 1948, a majority of the cabinet protested against Nosek's dismissal of eight non-communist SNB officers in Prague; Nosek ignored the order with the full backing of Prime Minister and KSČ leader Klement Gottwald. On 21 February, 12 non-communist government ministers resigned in protest. President Edvard Beneš initially refused to accept their resignations, which would have forced Gottwald to either back down, resign or call new elections. In response, Gottwald not only refused to resign, but demanded the replacement of the resigning ministers by KSČ members, under threat of a general strike. Ultimately, President Beneš gave in and appointed a government fully dominated by the KSČ, effectively giving legal sanction to the KSČ takeover.

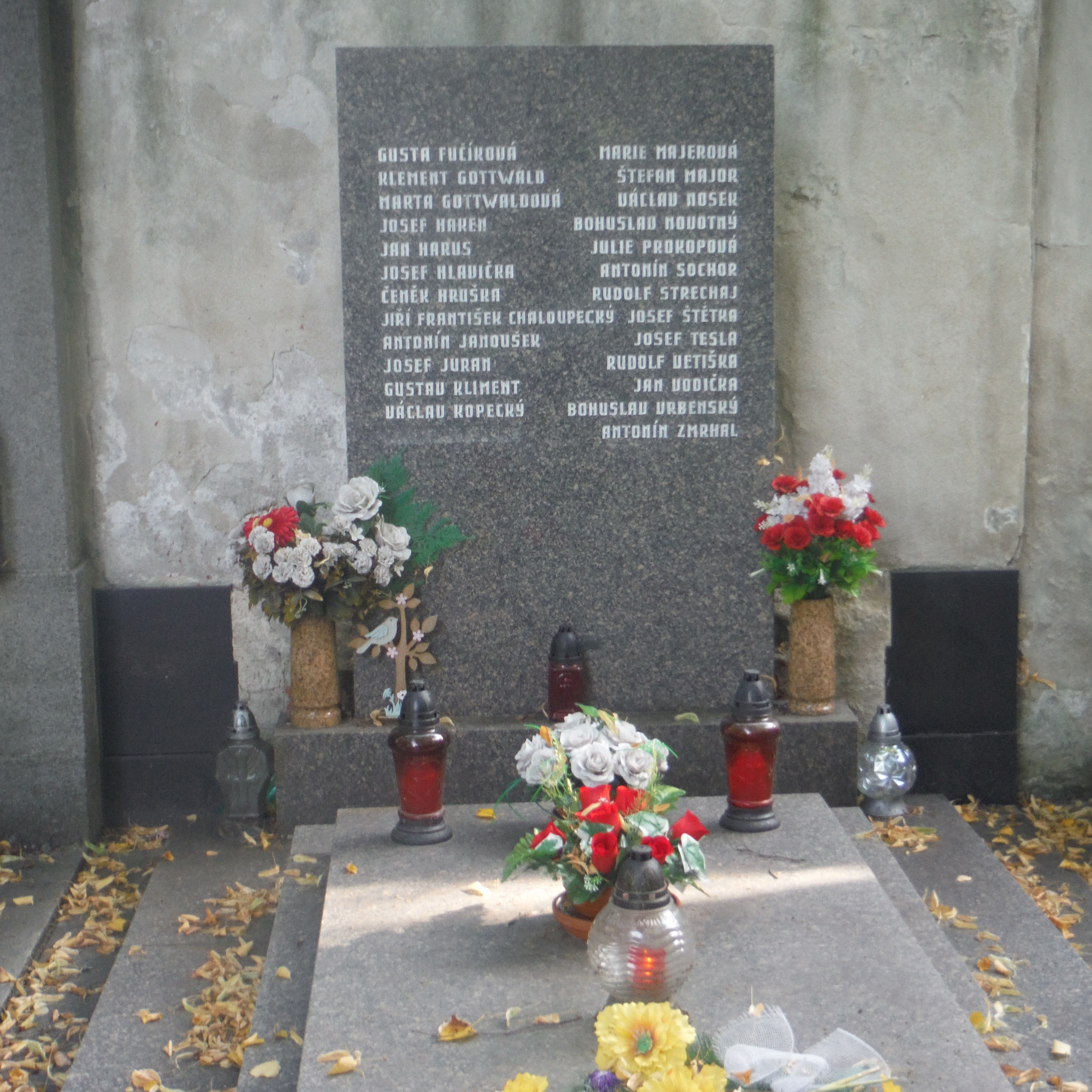
Olšany Cemetery, grave of Czech Communist politicians whose urns had originally been kept at the National Monument at Vítkov

After 1950, Nosek's influence decreased. The security forces were transferred from the Ministry of the Interior to the Ministry of National Security in May 1950, significantly curtailing Nosek's power. On 14 September 1953, Nosek left his position as Minister of the Interior, but remained in the government as Minister of Labour and Social Welfare until his death from lung cancer in July 1955. After cremation, his remains were buried at the Jan Žižka National Monument at Vítkov. In 1990, his ashes were moved to Olšany Cemetery, together with those of about 20 other communist leaders which had also originally been placed in the Jan Žižka National Monument.

== Honours and awards ==
- Order of the Republic (Czechoslovakia; 7 May 1955)
