= Antonín Gregor =

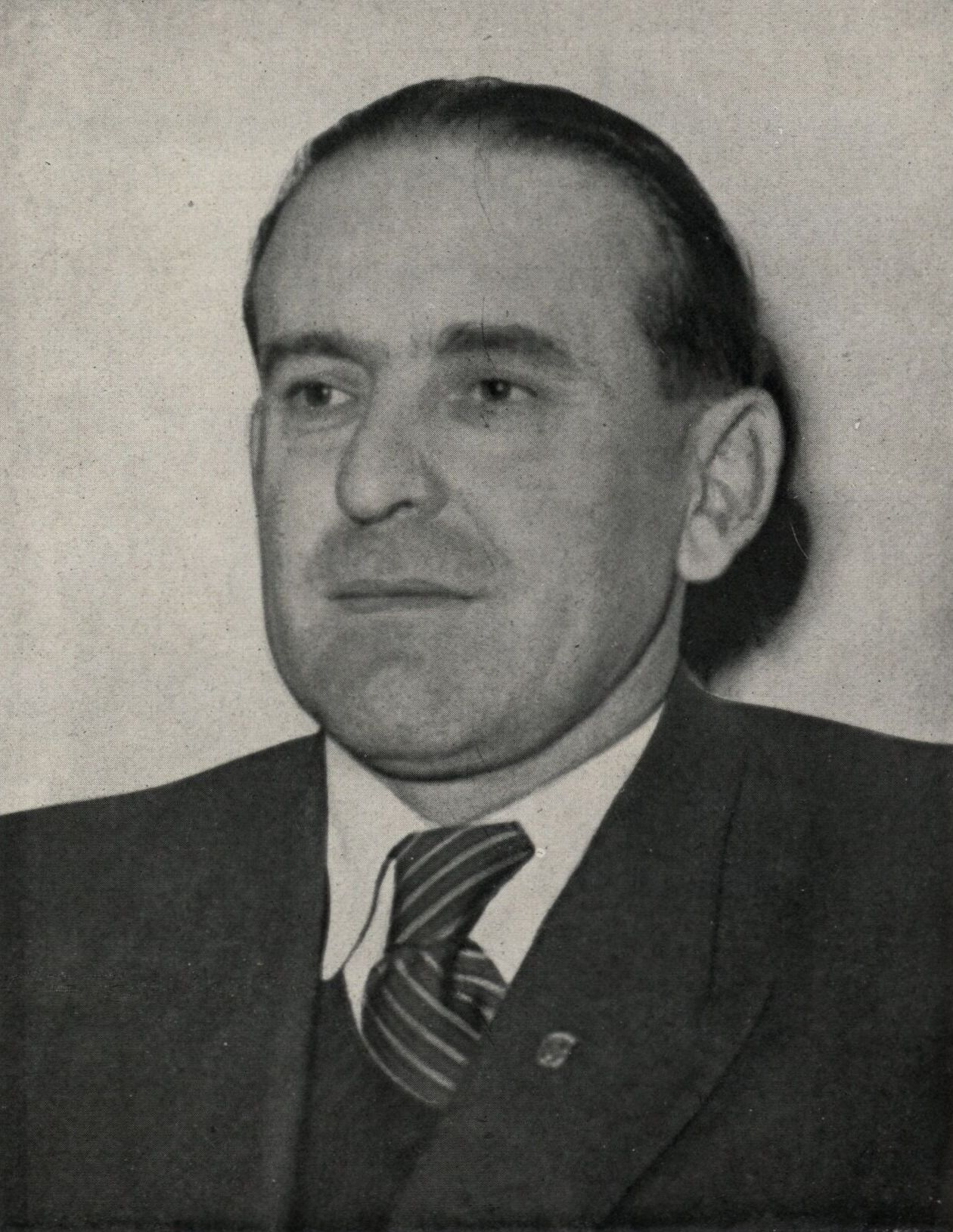
- Gregor in 1948

Minister of Foreign Trade
- In office 25 February 1948 – 2 December 1952
- Prime Minister: Klement Gottwald (1948); Antonín Zápotocký (1948–1952)
- Preceded by: Hubert Ripka
- Succeeded by: Richard Dvořák

Personal details
- Born: 9 September 1908 Staré Město, Austria-Hungary
- Died: 7 September 1986 (aged 77) Prague, Czechoslovakia
- Party: Communist Party of Czechoslovakia
- Other political affiliations: Czechoslovak Social Democratic Workers' Party

Antonín Gregor (9 September 1908 – 7 September 1986) was a Czechoslovak communist politician and diplomat.

== Biography ==
The son of a bricklayer, Gregor was born in Staré Město, Moravia. After matriculation from the gymnasium, he began studies at the Faculty of Law of Masaryk University in Brno, where he graduated with a doctorate in 1935. Gregor joined the Communist Party of Czechoslovakia (KSČ) while a student in 1928; in 1934, he left the party and joined the Czechoslovak Social Democratic Workers' Party. After completing his studies, Gregor was employed at the district courts in Uherské Hradiště and Brno, first as an auditor and from 1939 as a judge.

After the occupation of the Czech lands by Nazi Germany in 1939, Gregor joined the anti-Nazi resistance movement in southern Moravia. Towards the end of World War II, he again joined the KSČ. Gregor worked as a prosecutor in Uherské Hradiště from the end of the war, before being elected to the Constituent National Assembly in the May 1946 elections. In January 1948, he was elected a member of the Central Committee of the KSČ, and in February, he was appointed Minister of Foreign Trade. In this capacity he gradually increased the trade between Czechoslovakia and other Eastern Bloc countries, and in 1950 signed a trade agreement between his country and the Soviet Union.

A personal friend of Rudolf Slánský, Gregor came under suspicion with the Slánský trial in 1952. Although not arrested, he was dismissed from his responsibilities as government minister and member of the Central Committee in December 1952, and placed in a less central position in the Ministry of Justice. In 1954, Gregor was transferred to diplomatic service; he was ambassador to China between 1955 and 1957, Deputy Foreign Minister between 1957 and 1967, and finally ambassador to Poland between 1967 and 1970, after which he retired.
