= Václav Kopecký =

Czech member of Czechoslovak national parliament and Czechoslovak politician

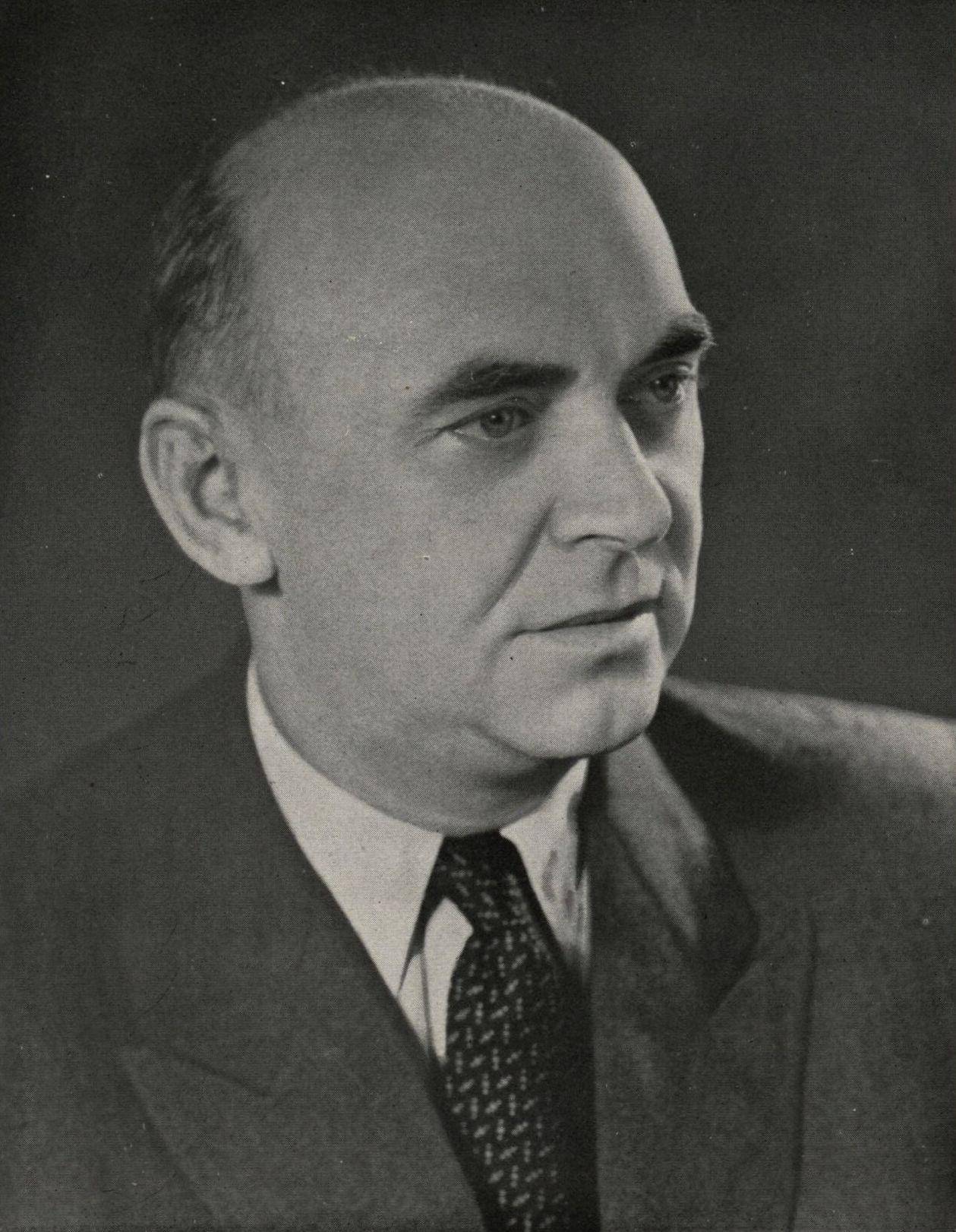
- Kopecký in 1948

Minister of Culture
- In office 14 September 1953 – 12 December 1954
- Prime Minister: Viliam Široký
- Preceded by: Position established
- Succeeded by: Ladislav Štoll

Minister of Information
- In office 5 April 1945 – 31 January 1953
- Prime Minister: Zdeněk Fierlinger (1945–1946); Klement Gottwald (1946–1948); Antonín Zápotocký (1948–1953)
- Preceded by: Position established
- Succeeded by: Position abolished

Personal details
- Born: 27 August 1897 Kosmonosy, Austria-Hungary
- Died: 5 August 1961 (aged 63) Prague, Czechoslovakia
- Party: Communist Party of Czechoslovakia
- Education: Faculty of Law, Charles University
- Awards: Order of Klement Gottwald

Václav Kopecký (27 August 1897 – 5 August 1961) was a Czech politician and journalist. He was the chief ideologue of the Communist Party of Czechoslovakia (KSČ) during the leadership of Klement Gottwald. A high-ranking member of the party since the interwar period, he spent World War II in Moscow and served as Minister of Culture and Minister of Information in post-war Czechoslovakia.

== Early career ==
Kopecký had a proletarian upbringing as the thirteenth child of a small tradesman and Sokol official. After completing his studies at a gymnasium in Kosmonosy, he moved to Prague, where he enrolled at the Faculty of Law of Charles University but left without fulfilling his studies. Initially a member of the Czechoslovak Social Democratic Party (ČSSD), Kopecký joined the Communist Party of Czechoslovakia (KSČ) upon its founding in 1921. During the interwar period, Kopecký was a member of the underground communist cell in the Karlín area of Prague, along with future party leaders Klement Gottwald and Rudolf Slánský. From 1940 to 1941, Kopecký was a representative of the Comintern, spending World War II in the Soviet Union. In July 1944, he voiced the sentiments of the emerging Communist consensus on postwar nationality issues, which rejected proletarian internationalism and accepted the Czechoslovak government-in-exile's plans for national homogenization via the expulsion of Sudeten Germans. Expressing hope that the Jewish question would "forever disappear […] as a decoy for reactionary elements", Kopecký declared:

Those Jews who feel themselves to be Germans or Hungarians must face the same measures that will be taken against the Germans and Hungarians in Czechoslovakia. The liquidation of anti-Semitism does not mean that we will grant the Jews special privileges if they feel themselves to be Germans or Hungarians. Nor will we allow those who feel themselves to be Germans and Hungarians to hide their true feelings behind the claim of Jewishness. Liquidation of anti-Semitism cannot be allowed to cause harm to the national and Slavic character of the future Czechoslovak Republic.

== Minister ==
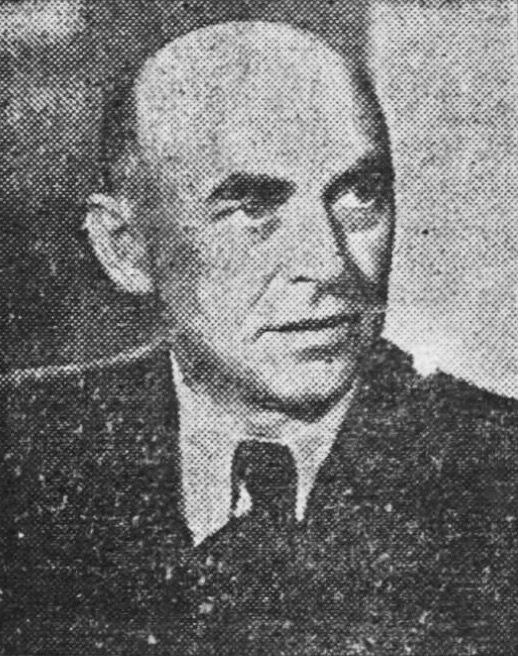
Václav Kopecký as Minister of Information, 1948

In post-war Czechoslovakia, Kopecký served as Minister of Information (1945–1953) and Minister of Culture (1953–1954). As Minister of Information, Kopecký surrounded himself with writers and artists close to the KSČ. Czech poet František Halas led the ministry's publishing department; writer Ivan Olbracht headed the radio department; visual artist Adolf Hoffmeister the foreign affairs department; and a film department was headed by Vítězslav Nezval. Under Kopecký's leadership, the Ministry of Information adapted the Nazi government's management of book publication under the guise of needing to replace the books destroyed during the Nazi occupation. Publishers had to submit their books to the publishing department of the Ministry of Information half a year in advance for review. This process did not initially involve ideological censorship and was aimed at freeing writers from the demands of the free market. After the death of Jan Masaryk, Kopecký instructed the media not to mention Masaryk's name.

Kopecký was noted for his antisemitic statements, criticizing Jews for Zionism and cosmopolitanism; he also stage-managed the Slánský trial. According to Jewish historian Michal Frankl, Kopecký "distinguished himself with antisemitic diatribes," criticizing the presence of Jews in politics and attacking Zionism and cosmopolitanism. In 1945, he accused the "Jewish super-rich like Petschek, Weinmann, Rothschild, Gutman" of "blood-sucking" and argued that wealthy Jews could not live in the people's democracy. He also objected to the resettlement of Jews from Carpathian Ruthenia in post-war Czechoslovakia. For Rudolf Slánský's fiftieth birthday in July 1951, Kopecký lauded him in the party newspaper Rudé právo and claimed that "already at home and at primary school [Slánský] absorbed a full-blooded native Czechness". Despite their former association, Kopecký became a personal enemy of Slánský and was involved in the Slánský trial as one of the main stage managers. In December 1951, he complained that many of the alleged conspirators "come from wealthy Jewish families" and that "the great part of people with a Jewish origin" subscribe to "cosmopolitan thinking". According to Kopecký, this demonstrated that the party was not taking the anti-cosmopolitan campaign seriously enough and was underestimating the "very serious danger" posed by Zionism. Jewish historian Karel Kaplan described Kopecký as "the party ideologue of show trials".

== Later life and career ==
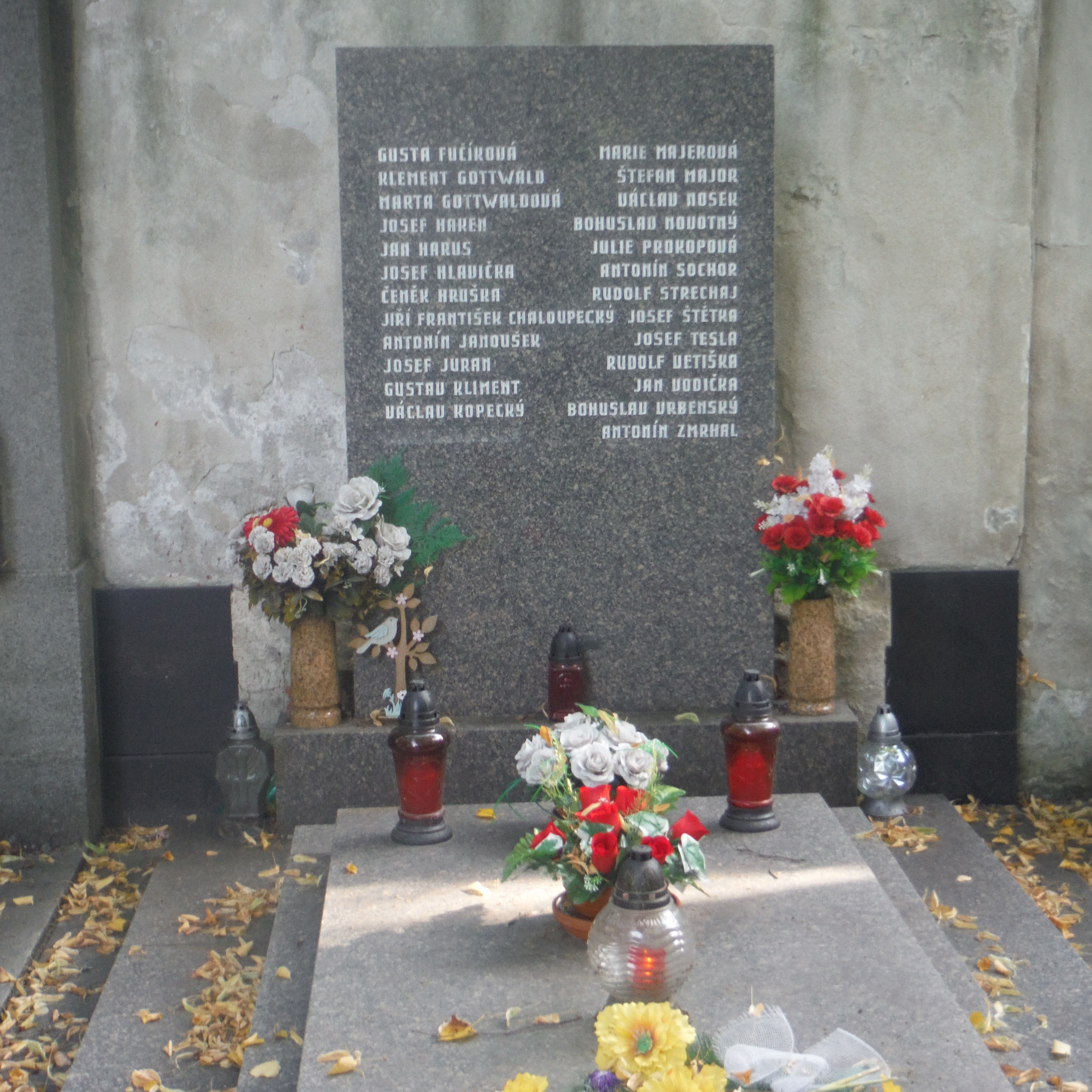
Olšany Cemetery, grave of Czech Communist politicians whose urns had originally been kept at the National Monument at Vítkov

On 31 January 1953 Václav Kopecký became deputy prime minister in Antonín Zápotocký's government. He kept this office on 21 March 1953 in the first government Viliam Široký formed on 21 March the same year, and on 14 September 1953 he became first deputy prime minister. He was also Minister of Culture in the Široký government from 14 September 1953 to 12 December 1954. He also took over the post of Deputy Prime Minister in the second Široký government.

Kopecký resigned from government positions on 12 December 1954. However, he remained a member of the Presidium of the Central Committee and retained a strong party influence. Kopecký adhered to a Stalinist line, trying to keep the party in the positions of the Gottwald period under the new conditions.

Václav Kopecký died in Prague on 5 August 1961 of a pulmonary embolism. He was given a state funeral. After cremation, his remains were buried at the Jan Žižka National Monument at Vítkov. In 1990, his ashes were moved to Olšany Cemetery, together with those of about 20 other communist leaders which had also originally been placed in the Jan Žižka National Monument.

After Kopecký's death, Strossmayerovo náměstí (Strossmayer Square) in Prague was renamed Kopeckého náměstí (Kopecký Square) in his honor; the old name was returned in 1968, during the Prague Spring.

== Honours and awards ==
- Order of Klement Gottwald, two times (7 May 1955; 26 August 1957)
