= Viliam Široký =

Slovak communist politician

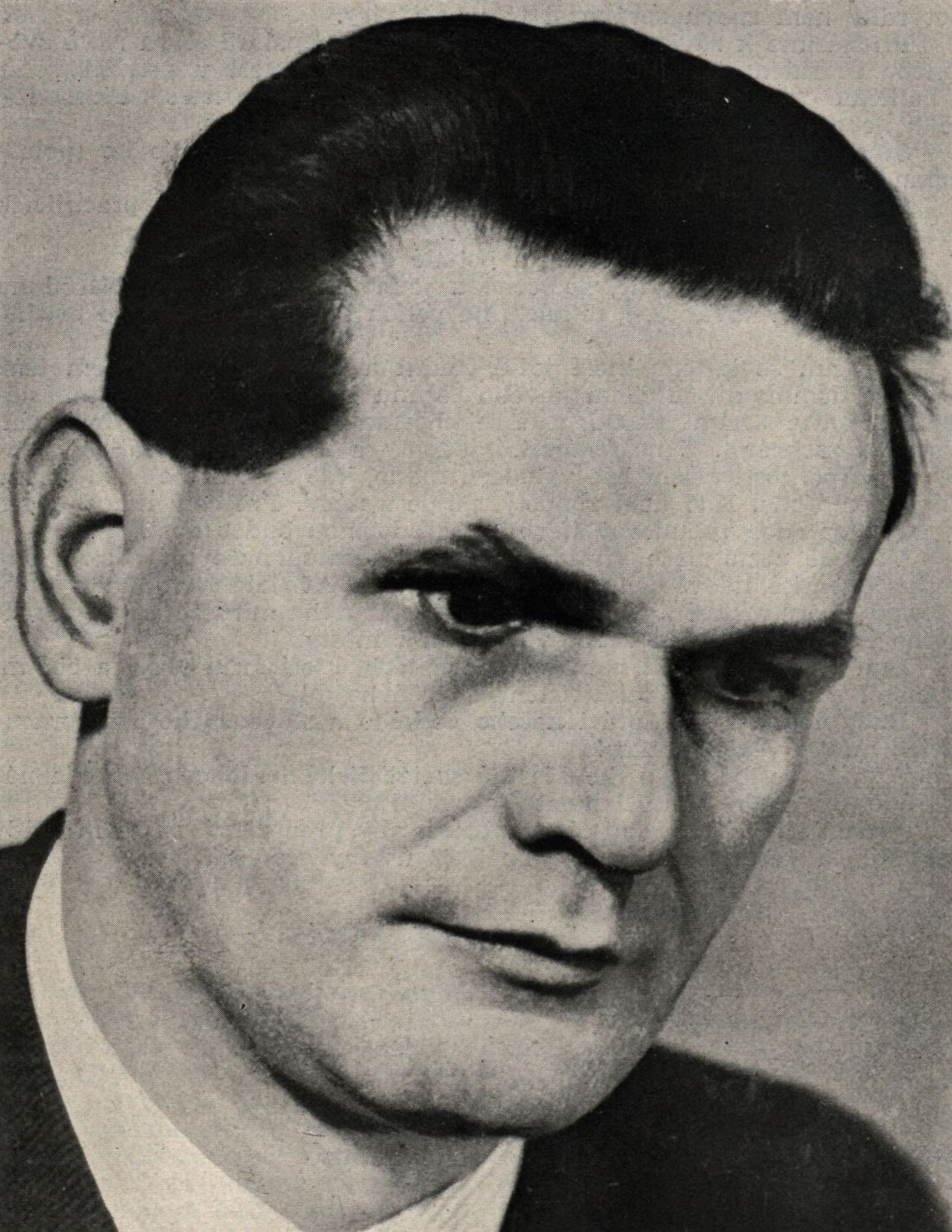
- Portrait of Široký, c. 1948

Interim President of Czechoslovakia
- In office 13 November 1957 – 19 November 1957
- Prime Minister: Himself
- Preceded by: Antonín Zápotocký
- Succeeded by: Antonín Novotný

Prime Minister of Czechoslovakia
- In office 21 March 1953 – 20 September 1963
- President: Antonín Zápotocký (1953–1957); Himself (Interim; 1957); Antonín Novotný (1957–1963)
- Deputy: Alexej Čepička
- Preceded by: Antonín Zápotocký
- Succeeded by: Jozef Lenárt

Minister of Foreign Affairs
- In office 14 March 1950 – 31 December 1952
- President: Klement Gottwald
- Prime Minister: Antonín Zápotocký
- Preceded by: Vladimír Clementis
- Succeeded by: Václav David

Deputy Prime Minister of Czechoslovakia
- In office 4 April 1945 – 21 March 1953
- President: Edvard Beneš (1945–1948); Klement Gottwald (1948–1953)
- Prime Minister: Zdeněk Fierlinger (1945–1946); Klement Gottwald (1946–1948); Antonín Zápotocký (1948–1953)

Personal details
- Born: 31 May 1902 Pozsony, Pozsony County, Austria-Hungary
- Died: 6 October 1971 (aged 69) Prague, Czechoslovakia
- Party: Communist Party of Czechoslovakia
- Awards: Order of Polonia Restituta; Two Orders of Klement Gottwald

Viliam Široký (31 May 1902 – 6 October 1971) was a Slovak politician. He was prominent communist politician of Czechoslovakia who served as Prime Minister from 1953 to 1963, and was also the leader of the Communist Party of Slovakia between 1945 and 1954.

== Biography ==
Široký was born into the family of railroad workers in Hungary. According to Muriel Blave, he was an ethnic Hungarian, but no Slovak source confirms this. He joined the Communist Party of Czechoslovakia (KSČ) at age 19, and quickly rose in the party apparatus after the election of Klement Gottwald as general secretary. Together with Václav Kopecký, Široký was an agent of the Soviet NKVD, whose task was to inform the Moscow leadership mainly about Gottwald's activities.

in 1935, Široký was elected as a member of the Czechoslovak National Assembly, where he sat until the KSČ was banned in 1938. Prior to the start of Second World War, he was also elected secretary of the Communist Party of Slovakia. In the autumn of 1938, Široký left for the USSR due to the growing threat of invasion from Nazi Germany. During the war, he first worked as a member of the exiled foreign secretariat of the Communist Party in Paris, and later in a similar position in Moscow. In 1941 he was sent to Slovakia, where he was soon arrested and imprisoned; first in Leopoldov Prison, and later in Nitra. At the beginning of 1945, he managed to escape and cross the approaching front to the Red Army.

After the end of the war, Široký was a member of the Presidium and the Politburo of the KSČ as well as its secretariat, making him one of the most influential men in Czechoslovakia. He also held important government positions: from April 4, 1945, he was Deputy Prime Minister of Czechoslovakia, a post which he upheld in several post-war governments until March 21, 1953. From March 14, 1950 to January 31, 1953, he was Minister of Foreign Affairs in Antonín Zápotocký's government, and he presided over this government from March 21, 1953, after Zápotocký became President. Subsequently, he was the prime minister of other governments and held the post of prime minister until 20 September 1963. When Zápotocký died in November 1957, Široký carried out most presidential duties for a week until party boss Antonín Novotný was elected president. He took an active part in negotiating and enforcing constitutional changes which resulted in the creation of the 1960 Constitution of the Czechoslovak Socialist Republic.

From 1949 onwards, Široký was an initiator of the campaign against so-called bourgeois nationalists in Czechoslovakia, which led to the suppression of Slovak politicians such as Vladimír Clementis, Laco Novomeský and Gustáv Husák, who were accused of prioritizing national Slovak issues over the social and ideological issues of Czechoslovakia. During a meeting of the KSČ leadership in April 1950, Široký specifically mentioned Husák and Novomeský as Slovak bourgeois nationalists; during another party meeting the following month, he also leveled the same charges against Karol Šmidke. The charges would culminate in a trial in April 1954, where Husák and other leading Slovak politicians were sentenced to lengthy prison terms.

As a result of his leading role in the campaign against bourgeois nationalists during the early 1950s, Široký's position became a burden for the party leadership under Antonín Novotný in the early 1960s, when the legitimacy of the trials were questioned and several of those imprisoned were rehabilitated. Široký was forced to resign as prime minister in September 1963, and was also removed from the Presidium of the KSČ. Five years later, during the Prague Spring of 1968, he was expelled from the party altogether. Široký's party membership would be restored shortly before his death in 1971, during the period of normalization headed by his former political enemy, Gustáv Husák.

== Honours and awards ==
=== Czechoslovak honours ===
- Order of Klement Gottwald, two times (7 May 1955; 30 May 1962)

=== Foreign honours ===
- (Poland) Grand Cross of the Order of Polonia Restituta, 5 July 1947

== See also ==
- List of prime ministers of Czechoslovakia

Political offices
Preceded by Vladimír Clementis	Minister of Foreign Affairs of Czechoslovakia; 1950–1952	Succeeded by Václav David
Preceded by Antonín Zápotocký	Prime Minister of Czechoslovakia; 1953–1963	Succeeded by Jozef Lenárt
