= Studeny =

Studeny/Studyony (masculine), Studenaya/Studyonaya (feminine), or Studenoye/Studyonoye (neuter) may refer to:

- Studený, a village in the Central Bohemian Region of the Czech Republic
- Studeny, Russia (Studenaya, Studenoye), name of several rural localities in Russia
