= First Vienna Award =

1938 treaty on Hungary's boundaries

- Territorial expansion of Hungary 1938–1941. First Vienna Award highlighted in violet.
- Signed: 2 November 1938
- Location: Belvedere Palace, Vienna
- Signatories: Hungary; Czechoslovakia; Germany; Italy; Non-signatories involved: Poland
- Parties: Hungary; Czechoslovakia

The First Vienna Award was a treaty signed on 2 November 1938 pursuant to the Vienna Arbitration, which took place at Vienna's Belvedere Palace. The arbitration and award were direct consequences of the previous month's Munich Agreement, which resulted in the partitioning of Czechoslovakia.

Hungary sought to reclaim the lost territories through peaceful ways to restore its historical borders, and reunite the significant Hungarian minority living right across its borders with the mother country. In the interwar period, Hungary was weaker economically and militarily than the neighbours against which it had territorial claims. Germany and Italy had supported the territorial claims of Hungary, and revision of the 1920 Treaty of Trianon, imposed on Hungary in the aftermath of World War I. Nazi Germany had already violated the Versailles Treaty via the remilitarisation of the Rhineland (7 March 1936) and the Anschluss of Austria (12 March 1938).

The First Vienna Award separated, from Czechoslovakia, territories in southern Slovakia and southern Carpathian Rus' which were mostly Hungarian-populated and returned them to Hungary. Hungary thus regained some of the territories (now parts of Slovakia and Ukraine) which Hungary had lost after World War I under the Treaty of Trianon. Czechoslovakia also ceded to Poland small patches of land in Spiš and Orava regions.

In mid-March 1939 Adolf Hitler gave Hungary permission to occupy the remainder of Carpathian Rus' (officially known as Carpatho-Ukraine since December 1938). This advanced Hungary's territory northward, up to the Polish border, thereby restoring a common Hungarian–Polish border, which had existed before the 1772 First Partition of Poland. Before the end of World War I and the Treaties of Trianon and Saint Germain, the Carpathian region of the former Kingdom of Hungary (Transleithania) in Austria-Hungary had, to the north, bordered the Kingdom of Galicia and Lodomeria, a constituent part of Austria's Cisleithania.

Six months after Hungary occupied the remainder of Carpathian Rus', in September 1939, in the wake of the German invasion of Poland, the Polish government and tens of thousands of Polish soldiers, airmen, and ground crews, including Stanisław Maczek's 10th Motorized Cavalry Brigade, as well as volunteers (collectively known as "Sikorski's tourists" by reference to an official statement by Joseph Goebbels) evacuated to Hungary and Romania, from where (thanks partly to the tacit acceptance of local governments) they were able to go on to France and French-mandated Syria to fight in the Polish Armed Forces in the West.

After World War II, the 1947 Treaty of Paris declared the Vienna Award null and void.

== Background ==
=== International situation ===
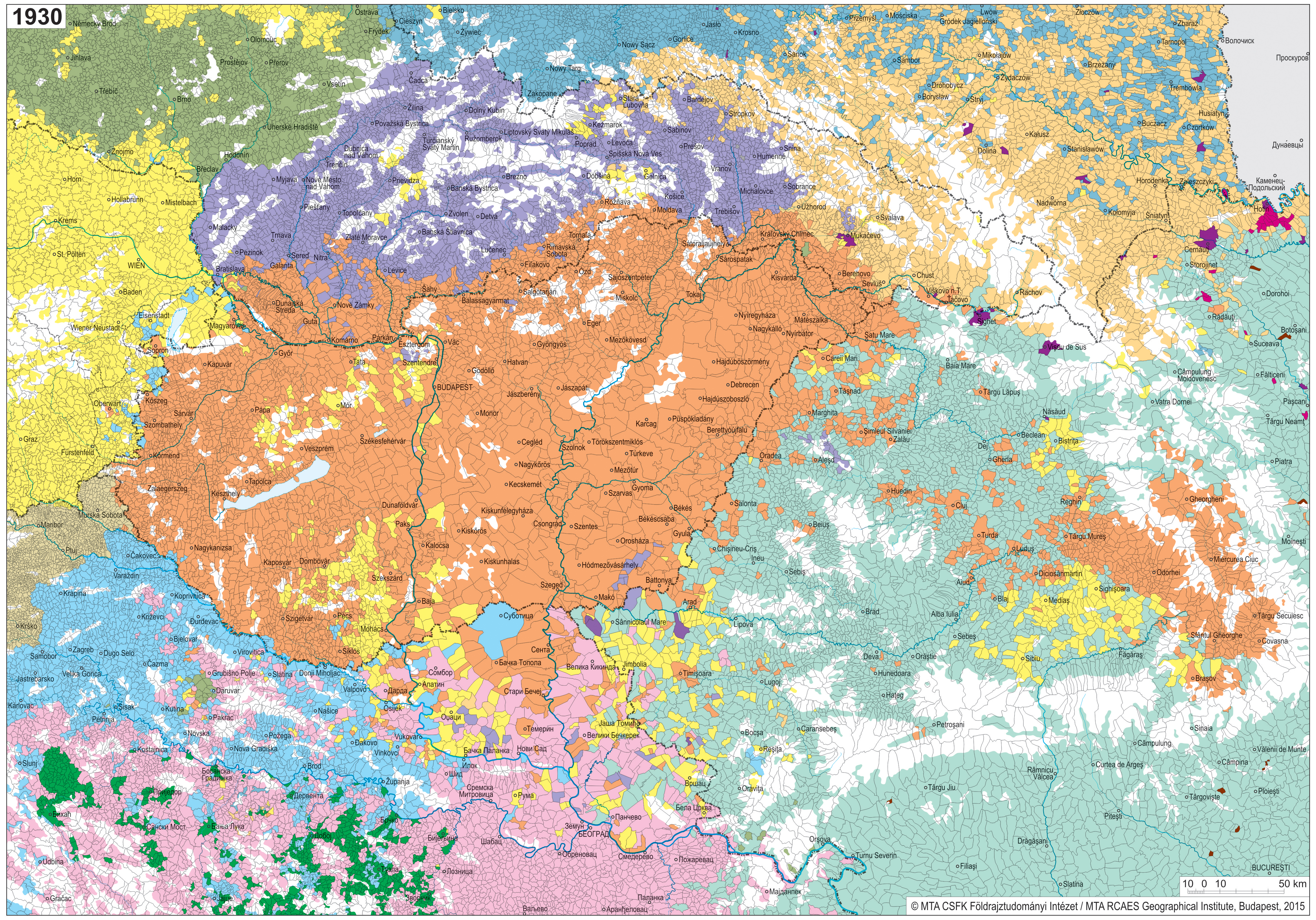
Ethnic map of the Kingdom of Hungary and the Carpatho-Pannonian area in 1930, based on the Hungarian (1930), Czechoslovak (1930), Romanian (1930), Yugoslav (1931), Polish (1931), and Austrian (1934) censuses.

From 1933 Hungary closely coordinated its foreign policies with those of Nazi Germany, in the hope of revising Hungary's borders as established in the 1920 Treaty of Trianon. In March 1933 Hungary's prime minister declared that Hungary "wanted justice on the historical principle" and desired the restoration to Hungary of Hungarian-inhabited territories that Hungary had lost after World War I. In June 1933 Hungarian Prime Minister Gyula Gömbös visited Germany, meeting with Adolf Hitler, and they concluded that Czechoslovakia was a principal obstacle to a "rearrangement" of Central Europe and therefore should be subverted internally, isolated internationally, and finally eliminated by military force. During a meeting with Hitler in August 1936, Miklós Horthy advocated a common attack against Czechoslovakia to excise a "cancerous tumor from the heart of Europe".

In late 1937 Hitler decided to open a campaign against Czechoslovakia. In 1938 Germany and Hungary focused on creating a common platform to that end, and in November 1938 Hitler negotiated with the Hungarian government concerning the fate of Czechoslovakia.

Hungarian representatives considered an overt attack on Czechoslovakia too dangerous and wanted to preserve that country's relations with France and Britain, whose support in the question of Hungarian minorities was conditional on Hungary's not joining with Germany in military actions. This outraged Hitler and led to a change in Germany's view of Hungarian territorial demands in eastern Czechoslovakia.

Before the Munich Agreement, a Hungarian government emissary had officially asked the German and Italian delegations to resolve Hungarian demands together with the questions of Sudeten Germans. However, Hitler did not agree because he was not satisfied with the previous passivity of Hungary and because he had his own plans for Central Europe. The French and British delegates, Prime Minister Édouard Daladier and Neville Chamberlain, saw potential danger in such a complex solution, but the Italian delegate, Prime Minister Benito Mussolini, allowed Hungarian demands to be reflected in an appendix to the agreement. It requested Czechoslovakia to resolve questions with Hungary and Poland within three months by bilateral negotiations, or matters would be resolved by the four signatories of the agreement.

After the acceptance of the ultimatum concerning Trans-Olza, which had been annexed by Czechoslovakia in 1920 after the Czechoslovak invasion that triggered the Polish-Czechoslovak War, up to the armistice line, and smaller disputed border areas by Poland, the Hungarian question had remained open. Poland later annexed further small border territories in northern Slovakia (on 1 December 1938, villages in Kysuce, Orava and Spiš) comprising 226 km^{2}, with 4,280 inhabitants (see separate article, Polish–Czechoslovak border conflicts). The Hungarian government understood the appendix of the Munich Agreement as an agreement of the Great Powers for the revision of peace treaties and emphasised that it did not mean only the revision of borders based on ethnicity but also the eventual restoration of Hungarian territory before 1918 and the creation of a common border with Poland. Official Hungarian circles were aware that Hungary alone was too weak to enforce its territorial demands towards Czechoslovakia because they knew that any attack would encounter the resistance of the more modern Czechoslovak Army. (Note: Horthy declared to Polish Envoy Leon_Orłowski in Budapest on October 16, 1938, "A Hungarian military intervention would be a disaster for Hungary at this moment, because the Czechoslovak army has currently the best arms in Europe and Budapest is only five minutes from the border for Czechoslovak aircraft. They would neutralize me before I could get up from my bed". Deák 1991, p. 149)

Therefore, Hungary decided to fight Czechoslovakia in the diplomatic field instead and to push for territorial revision in the spirit of Munich Agreement.

=== Border conflicts and sabotage ===
The Munich Agreement had defined a three-month period to resolve Hungarian demands, but the Hungarian government pushed to start negotiations immediately. The pressure was increased by the Hungarians with border conflicts and diversion actions in Czechoslovakia. The first conflict occurred in the early morning of October 5, 1938, when troops of the Royal Hungarian Army crossed the border and attacked Czechoslovak positions near Jesenské with the goal of capturing Rimavská Sobota. Hungarian troops withdrew after the arrival of Czechoslovak reinforcements, which killed nine Hungarians and captured prisoners. Two days later, Hungarian troops again attempted to cross the Danube near Parkan (Párkány). The Czechoslovak situation was worse in Carpathian Ruthenia, with its lower density of fortifications; there paramilitary units of the Rongyos Gárda infiltrated Czechoslovakia. The first two units of the Rongyos Gárda crossed the border on October 6, 1938, and two days later, they blew up the bridge over the Borozhava River.

Such actions continued during the negotiations and after the First Vienna Award. During the second day of bilateral negotiations (October 10, 1938), Hungarian troops murdered a railway officer in Borozhava and damaged railway facilities.

=== Internal situation in Czechoslovakia ===
Czechoslovakia had an interest in stabilising the situation because its foreign ministry had to resolve problems with Poland and Germany and did not want to start negotiations before October 15. The Czechoslovak minister of foreign affairs was focused on building new relationships with Germany and Italy to negotiate guarantees for new borders. After the Munich Agreement, all political subjects in Slovakia concluded that it is necessary to change the Slovak position and declared its autonomy on October 6, 1938. The new autonomous government understood the definition of borders as a priority, and the Slovak People's Party requested to participate in the negotiations. The central government in Prague was aware that the delegation should be led by a Slovak and considered Milan Hodža or Imrich Karvaš. However, after the creation of an autonomous government, Foreign Minister František Chvalkovský proposed its representatives: Jozef Tiso or Ferdinand Ďurčanský. Both politicians at first refused on the justification that the role was in competition with the central government. After it had been emphasised that it is mainly the interest of Slovakia, they decided to accept. Moreover, Tiso hoped that his Hungarian partners would more likely accept concessions if they did not negotiate with representatives of the central government.

Under the pressure of the threat of internal destabilisation of Czechoslovakia because of diverting actions and the further radicalisation of the situation in Hungary, Czechoslovakia agreed to begin negotiations on October 9.

== Pre-arbitration negotiations ==
=== In Komárno ===
Negotiations were held between October 9 and October 13, 1938, in Komárno, on the Slovak northern bank of the Danube River, just on the border with Hungary. The Czechoslovak delegation was led by Jozef Tiso, the prime minister of the autonomous government, without any experience with similar negotiations, and it included Ferdinand Ďurčanský, Minister of Justice in the Slovak cabinet, and General Rudolf Viest. The central government of Czechoslovakia was represented by Ivan Krno, Political Director of the Czechoslovak Ministry of Foreign Affairs, who held rank of Ambassador Extraordinary and Minister Plenipotentiary. Autonomous Carpathian Ruthenia was represented by Ivan Párkányi, who was a minister without portfolio. The Czechoslovak (Slovak and Ruthenian) delegation was not completely prepared for lack of time. By contrast, the Hungarian delegation comprised experienced individuals and was led by Foreign Minister Kálmán Kánya and Education Minister Pál Teleki. The Hungarian government welcomed the composition of Czechoslovak delegation and believed that it would be easier to influence the inexperienced Slovak politicians by promises. That expectation was not fulfilled since other Slovak delegates rejected any possibility of returning to Hungary.

The Hungarian government's strategy for the negotiations was to demand areas in which at least 50% of Hungarians lived according to the 1910 census. That formulation was chosen with respect to the signers of the Munich Agreement, but Hungary also requested areas that did not match those criteria. On the first day, Hungary supplied memorandum with the requested territorial changes. The Hungarians further demanded a plebiscite in the remaining territory in which Slovaks and Ruthenians would declare whether they wanted to be incorporated into Hungary.

Hungary demanded territories up to and including a line defined by Devín (Hungarian: Dévény), Bratislava (Pozsony), Nitra (Nyitra), Tlmače (Garamtolmács), Levice (Léva), Lučenec (Losonc), Rimavská Sobota (Rimaszombat), Jelšava (Jolsva), Rožňava (Rozsnyó), Košice (Kassa), Trebišov (Tőketerebes), Pavlovce nad Uhom (Pálóc), Uzhhorod (Slovak: Užhorod, Hungarian: Ungvár), Mukacheve (Mukačevo, Munkács), and Vinogradiv (Nagyszőlős). The territory was 14,106 km^{2} (with 12,124 km^{2} in Slovakia and 1,982 km^{2} in Carpathian Ruthenia). It included 1,346,000 citizens (1,136,000 in Slovakia, 210,000 in Carpathian Ruthenia). According to the last census, 678,000 of them had declared a non-Hungarian nationality (553,000 in Slovakia, 125,000 in Carpathian Ruthenia) in 1930.

Hungary also requested the immediate takeover of two border towns from Czechoslovakia as a "goodwill gesture". The Czechoslovak delegation agreed on the railway town of Slovenské Nové Mesto (until 1918, it had been a suburb of the Hungarian town of Sátoraljaújhely) and the town of Šahy (Hungarian: Ipolyság). Both were occupied by Hungary on October 12.

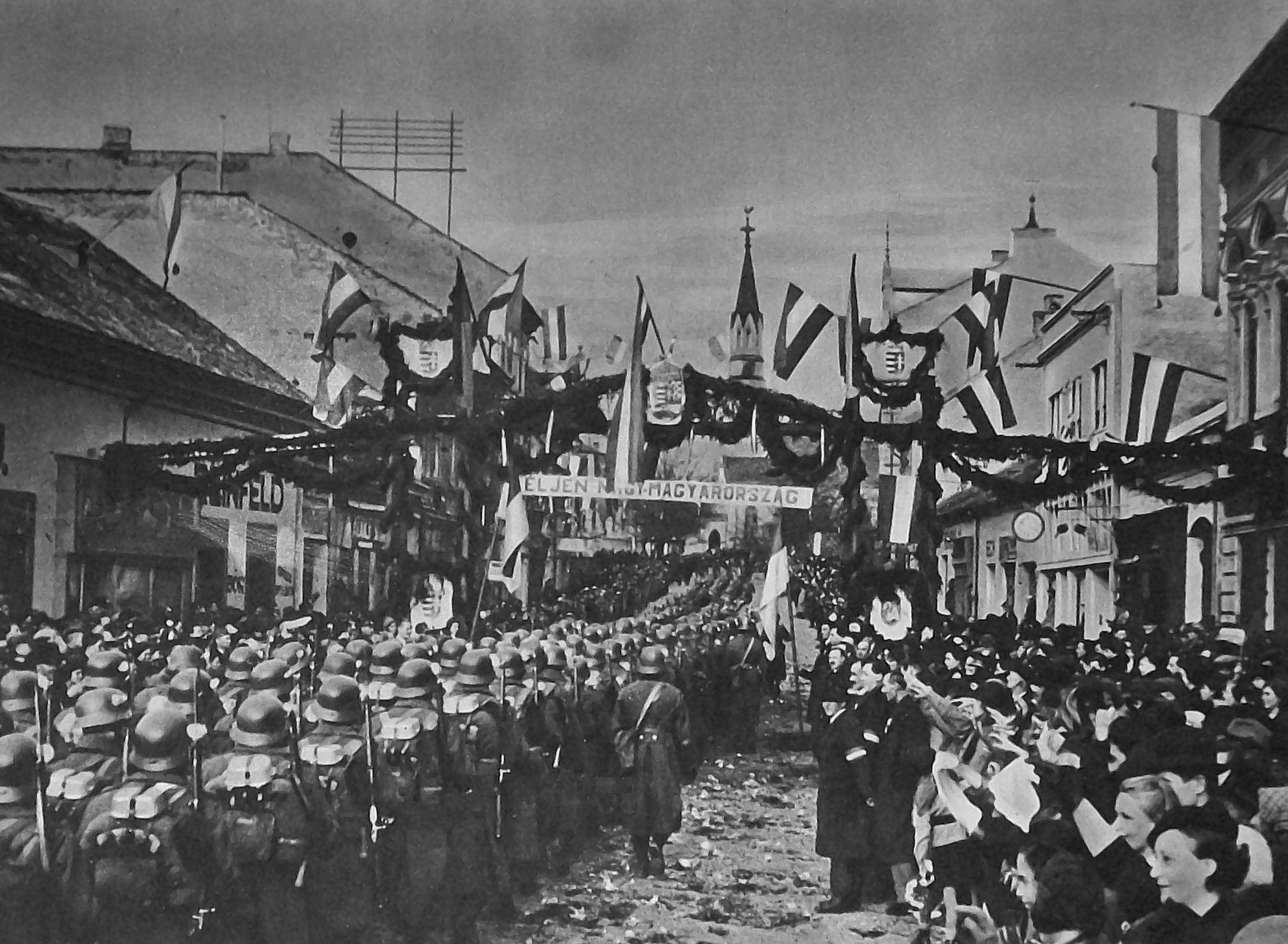
Local population welcoming Hungarian troops in Losonc (Lučenec)

The main difference between both parties' arguments was that the Hungarians presented the 1910 census figures, as had Germany during the Munich Conference, but Czechoslovakia presented the latest 1930 figures and contested the validity of the 1910 census. Later, Czechoslovakia also presented figures from Hungarian censuses before 1900. It considered the 1910 census as unacceptable because it represented the peak of Magyarization and differed from previous Hungarian and later Czechoslovak censuses as well as postwar censuses from other countries in which the Hungarian minority lived (Austria, Romania and Yugoslavia). Tiso noted that he, for example, had been counted as a Hungarian during that census.

Meanwhile, the Hungarian delegation did not accept the results of the Czechoslovak census and proposed to use the 1880 Hungarian census, before the peak of Magyarization, as a compromise. The Hungarians also did not agree on the definition of purely-Hungarian towns like Košice.

Demographics of Košice based on official Hungarian and Czechoslovak censuses (from materials of Czechoslovak delegation)
Year	Slovaques (Slovaks)	Magyars (Hungarians)	Allemands (Germans)	Ruthènes (Ruthenians)
1857	4,379	2,500	4,200	100
1880	(40.9%) 10,311	(39.8%) 10,007	4,218	
1890	9,713	10,421	3,891	
1900	9,244	25,996	3,446	
1910	6,547	33,350	3,189	
1930	42,245	11,504	3,354	

The request for a plebiscite on Slovaks and Ruthenians for rejoining Hungary was rejected by Czechoslovakia as irrelevant because the Munich Agreement did not address question of either nation, the idea violated the sovereignty of Czechoslovakia and the Ruthenian delegate declared that the Ruthenian nation (except communists) had already expressed its will to live in Czechoslovakia.

The Hungarian delegation rejected several Czechoslovak proposals, such as an offer to create an autonomous Hungarian territory within Slovakia. Kánya characterised the proposal as a "bad joke" and declared that it was "absolutely impossible to discuss this question". Czechoslovakia then offered to cede Great Rye Island (Slovak: Žitný ostrov, Hungarian: Csallóköz, 1838 km^{2}, with 105,418 inhabitants, almost all of whom were Hungarians), the creation of a free port in the town of Komárno and a population exchange in the remaining frontier regions.

Hungary turned down that offer as well, and on October 13, the Czechoslovak delegation proposed another solution. The goal of the Czechoslovak proposal was to the create borders with balanced minorities in both states (including Slovaks in Békés County). As well as the principle of balanced minorities, the proposal included the Czechoslovak strategic interest of preserving the railway to Carpathian Ruthenia. Pál Teleki rejected the proposal without a deeper study as a "humorous border", and the Hungarian delegation "analysed the map only to be polite".

Although the Czechoslovak delegation declared that it was open for further discussion about its proposal and offered consultation with its experts, the Hungarian delegation rejected further discussion. On the evening of October 13, after consultations in Budapest, Kánya declared that the negotiations had failed and asked the four signatories of the Munich Agreement to be the adjudicators. As the United Kingdom and France had decided not to make any decision, the adjudicators became German Foreign Minister Joachim von Ribbentrop and Italian Foreign Minister Galeazzo Ciano.

=== German mediation ===
On October 13, the day that the negotiations deadlocked, Hungary conducted a partial mobilisation. Czechoslovakia performed actions to strengthen its security and declared martial law in the frontier region. After the failure of bilateral negotiations, the border dispute escalated to a wider international level. The Axis powers took the initiative in favour of Hungary to realise their own plans for the region.

Hungary sent delegations to both Italy and Germany. Count Csáky went to Rome. Kálmán Darányi went to Germany and told Hitler that Hungary was ready to fight and "[would] not accept the behavior of the Slovaks". However, the situation in Central Europe changed after the Munich Agreement, and the German-Hungarian-Polish bloc was over. Germany refused to take steps to strengthen Hungary. Hitler declared that if Hungary started a conflict, nobody would help it. He rejected the idea of a common conference of the four signers of the Munich Agreement, the demands for plebiscites in Slovakia and Carpathian Ruthenia and the Hungarian claims for Bratislava. Instead, he advised Hungary to continue the negotiations and to preserve the ethnic principle. He proposed for Germany to act as a mediator. Ribbentrop and Darányi agreed on a map which would be offered to Czechoslovakia ("Ribbentrop line"). The line later became source of misunderstanding between Hungary and Germany. According to Darányi, Ribbentrop did not accept his requests because several important towns remained on the Czechoslovak side (Bratislava, Nitra, Uzhorod and Mukachevo; the question of Košice was open). Germany rejected the accusations and declared that Ribbentrop line was created after it had consulted Darányi and that he had agreed to it. When the Hungarian government insisted, Ribbentrop announced that German mediation had ended.

At the same time as Darányi, Czechoslovak Foreign Minister František Chvalkovský also visited Germany to negotiate with its representatives. Hitler blamed Czechoslovakia for the failure of negotiations with Hungary and requested their renewal. He gave Chvalkovský a map with the Ribbentrop line and promised to guarantee new borders, which were based on that proposal. Back in Prague, Chvalkovský recommended to accept the Ribbentrop line. However, the Slovak autonomous government was against such a solution and hoped to achieve further corrections. On October 19, Tiso and Ďurčanský met with Ribbentrop in Munich and managed to persuade him to assign Košice to Czechoslovakia and to accept the prior proposal of keeping balanced minorities both in Czechoslovakia and Hungary. Czechoslovak experts prepared material that argued that the Hungarian statistics were unreliable and that the Hungarian demands did not comply with the ethnic principle but were driven by foreign policy and strategic factors. They argued that Hungarian claims for Košice were not motivated by ethnic or historical reasons but focused on the elimination of the largest communication, economic and cultural centre it the east and on the interruption of the railway to Carpathian Ruthenia and allied Romania. That would totally isolate the eastern part of the republic, which could be later annexed by Hungary. Both Tiso and Ďurčanský believed that they had persuaded Hitler. Tiso sent a letter to Prague to notify on the positive results.

A few days later, Ribbentrop revealed himself to be quite hostile to the Hungarians. As Ciano saw it, "The truth is that he intends to protect Czechoslovakia as far as he can and sacrifice the ambitions, even the legitimate ambitions, of Hungary".

After October 17, activities around Subcarpathian Rus' intensified. Poland proposed a partition of Subcarpathian Rus' among Hungary, Poland and Romania. Romania, a staunch ally of Czechoslovakia against Hungary, rejected the proposal and even offered military support for Czechoslovakia in Subcarpathia. Hungary, in turn, attempted to persuade the Subcarpathian Rus' representatives to become part of Hungary. A common Polish-Hungarian border, which would arise by a Hungarian annexation of Subcarpathian Rus', had been a longtime dream of both Poland and Hungary.

Poland was moving troops toward that border for support. However, since a common Polish-Hungarian frontier would mean a flanking of Germany, Germany was willing to face such a frontier only if Poland compensated by giving the Danzig Corridor to Germany. Poland refused the German proposal.

On October 20, the Rusyns produced a resolution more or less in favour of a plebiscite on all of Subcarpathian Rus' becoming part of Hungary. Five days later, Subcarpathian Prime Minister Andriy Borody was arrested in Prague, and Subcarpathian Foreign Minister Avhustyn Voloshyn was appointed prime minister. He was willing to consider the cession of only ethnically-Hungarian territories to Hungary and rejected the idea of a plebiscite.

=== Final failure of bilateral negotiations ===
Negotiations between Czechoslovakia and Hungary resumed by diplomatic channels. Czechoslovakia adopted the "Ribbentrop line" in the hope that it would receive a guarantee of new borders from the side of Axis powers and proposed it officially on October 22. Czechoslovakia offered to cede Hungary territory that had 494,646 Hungarians and 168,632 Slovaks and to retain Bratislava, Nitra and Košice. Hungary turned down the proposal, which caused Germany to withdraw its position as mediator. Hungary demanded for the territories offered by Czechoslovakia to be immediately occupied by Hungary, for there be a plebiscite in the disputed territory and for Subcarpathia to "decide its own future". Czechoslovakia found it unacceptable to cede territories immediately that had not been the subject of discussion and to resolve the question of the remaining parts later. By accepting the proposal, Czechoslovak border fortifications would become Hungarian, and the Hungarian Army could invade more Czechoslovak territory.

Hungary also warned that if Czechoslovakia refused that proposal, Hungary would demand arbitration (Italo-German in Western Slovakia, Italo-German-Polish in Eastern Slovakia and Subcarpathian Rus'). Then, Czechoslovakia would have no choice but to accept Hungarian demands or to agree with arbitration. That decision was forced also by fact that both France and Britain had lost interest on Czechoslovakia and considered the region to be in the German sphere of influence.

Both parties hoped that Germany would support their demands. The Slovak autonomous government also accepted the idea of arbitration with unrealistic expectations, based on Ribbentrop's assurances.

Although the Hungarian government demanded arbitration, it had not had the prior approval of Germany, which insisted on its negative opinion, Hitler's disagreement, Ribbentrop's disappointment with previous negotiations with Darányi and the danger of military conflict if one country did not accept the results.

Hungary managed to persuade Italy that the powerful German influence that was exercised through Czechoslovakia could be eliminated by a strong Hungary. Ciano accepted the proposal and promised to advocate Hungarian interests. During Ribbentrop's visit to Rome (October 27–30, 1938), Ciano persuaded Ribbentrop on the importance of arbitration for the Axis powers's future position in the region, and Ribbentrop promised to persuade Hitler.

Italy took the initiative and proposed to achieve common agreement in Rome as a basis for arbitration. Ciano, who had been briefed by Hungarian experts, was in a better position than the less-informed Ribbentrop and so achieved several important concessions. On October 31, the Hungarian envoy in Rome confidentially informed Hungarian government, "Ribbentrop definitely agreed with the return of Košice, Uzhorod and Mukachevo".

On October 29, 1938, Czechoslovakia and Hungary officially asked Germany and Italy to arbitrate and declared in advance that they would abide by the results.

== Arbitration ==
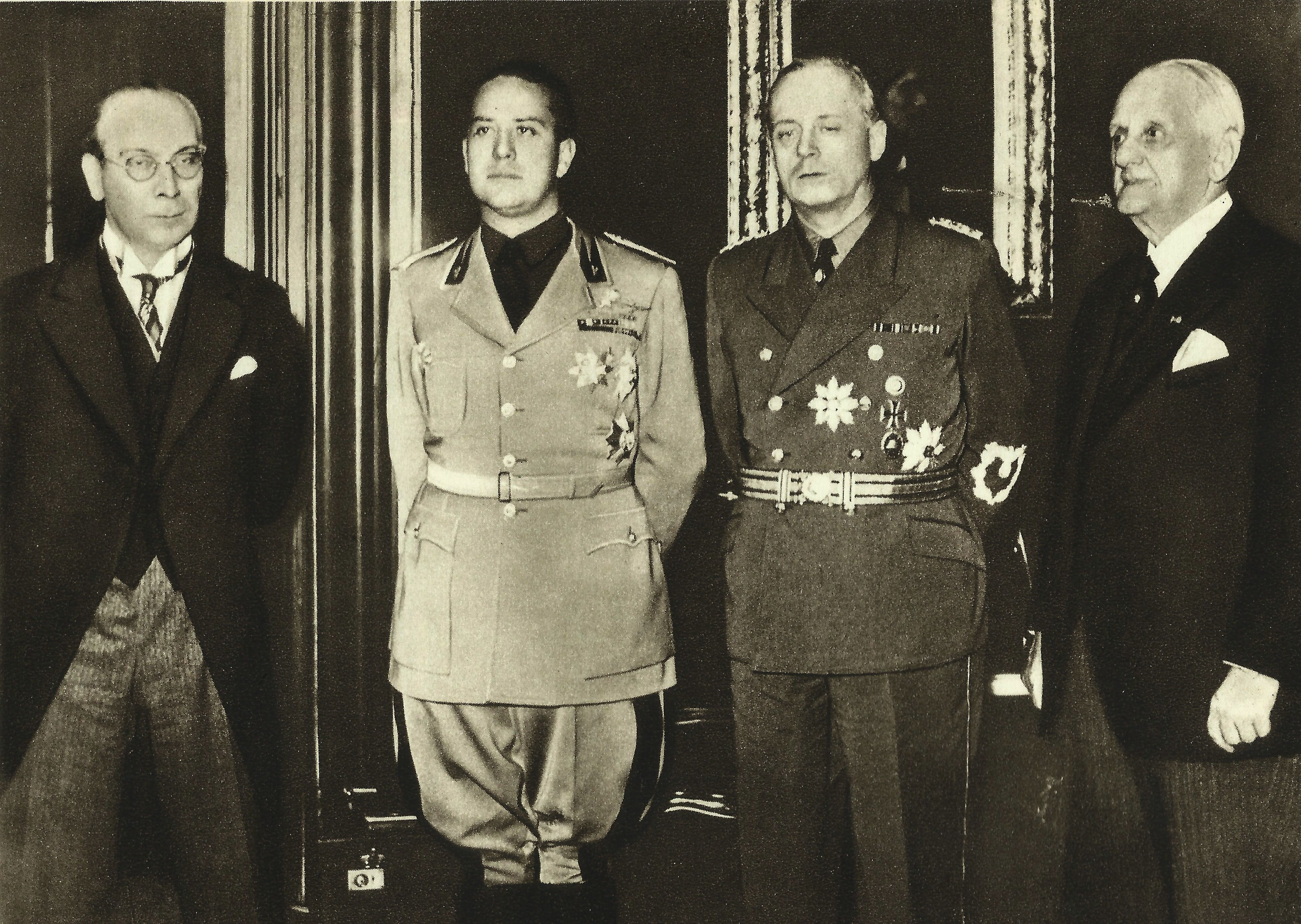
František Chvalkovský, Galeazzo Ciano, Joachim von Ribbentrop, Kálmán Kánya

The award was made in Vienna by the foreign ministers of Germany, Joachim von Ribbentrop, and of Italy, Galeazzo Ciano. The Hungarian delegation was led by Foreign Minister Kálmán Kánya, accompanied by Education Minister Pál Teleki. The Czechoslovak delegation was led by Foreign Minister František Chvalkovský, accompanied by Ivan Krno. Important members of the Czechoslovak delegation included representatives of Subcarpathian Rus' (Prime Minister Avgustyn Voloshyn) and of Slovakia (Prime Minister Jozef Tiso and Justice Minister Ferdinand Ďurčanský). Also present was Hermann Göring. A few days before the arbitration, Budapest had received messages from some borderline villages that rejected becoming part of Hungary ("Stay there, do not liberate us. We are having a good time, better than you, liberate yourself").

The arbitration began in the Belvedere Palace, in Vienna, at noon on November 2, 1938. The Czechoslovak and the Hungarian delegations were allowed to present their arguments. Chvalkovský was brief and left the task of presenting the Czechoslovak case to Krno. Despite explicit demands by the Czechoslovak representatives, both arbiters refused to let Tiso and Voloshyn participate. Ribbentrop and Ciano reasoned that only the representatives of central governments could participate (Czechoslovakia, rather than the partially-autonomous Slovakia or Carpatho-Ruthenia). They assumed that Chvalkovský would be more submissive and that Tiso would complicate the negotiations. The negotiations were a formality, and a new border was drawn after half a day. When the award was announced by Ribbentrop around 7 p.m., the Czechoslovak delegation was so shocked that Tiso actually had to be talked by Ribbentrop and Chvalkovský into signing the document.

== Results ==
Czechoslovakia had to surrender the territories in southern Slovakia and southern Carpathian Ruthenia south of the line to the border with Romania. That included the towns of Senec (Szenc), Galanta (Galánta), Vráble (Verebély), Levice (Léva), Lučenec (Losonc), Rimavská Sobota (Rimaszombat), Jelšava (Jolsva), Rožnava (Rozsnyó), Košice (Kassa), Michaľany (Szentmihályfalva), Veľké Kapušany (Nagykapos), Uzhhorod (Ungvár), and Mukachevo (Munkács). Slovakia lost 10,390 km^{2} with 854,277 inhabitants – 503,980 Hungarians (58,99%), 272,145 Slovaks or Czechs (32,43%), 26,151 Jews (3,06%), 8,947 Germans (1,05%), 1,825 Ruthenians, 14,617 other and 26,005 foreign citizens according to the Czechoslovak census of 1930. By considering the average population growth since the last census, it is possible to estimate the total size of population at the time of the arbitration at 935,000 people, 300,000 of whom were Slovaks or Czechs. Czechoslovakia lost also additional territory in Carpathian Ruthenia. Czechoslovakia lost the direct railway connection to Carpathian Ruthenia and to its ally Romania.

Between October 28 and 29, 1938, Béla Imrédy and the leader of the United Hungarian Party Andor Jaross made an agreement that representatives of the party who stayed in the redeemed territories would be part of a civic group of general staff, which would hold supreme authority. One of its parts (the Upper Country Unification Group) later became the basis for the Ministry for Upper Country, led by Jaross. All other political parties were banned, and obstacles were made for the introduction of other parties from Hungary. The United Hungarian Party then used its power for the persecution of Slovaks and of Hungarians who had disagreed with the activities against Czechoslovakia before the award.

After the Vienna Award, the Hungarian government and United Hungarian Party organised celebrations and a triumphant entry of the Hungarian Army into the redeemed territories. Organizers consciously imitated the entry of Hitler's army into the Sudetenland. The result of arbitration was met by most of the Hungarian population by local statements of disagreement. Hungarian Honvéds were not welcomed also in some "pure Hungarian" villages, and in one village, their accommodation had to be arranged by force. The ceded territories were occupied by the Royal Hungarian Army (Magyar Királyi Honvédség) between November 5 and 10, 1938. Hungary imposed a military administration on the redeemed territories. On November 11, Horthy solemnly entered the main town, Košice (Kassa). The military administration was changed to a civilian administration on December 21, 1938. The recovered Upper Hungary territories were incorporated into Hungary on November 12, 1938, by an act of the Hungarian Parliament. By following the former counties of the Kingdom of Hungary, the occupied territory was divided into two new counties with seats in Nové Zámky and Levice, and some lands became part of other Hungarian counties.

On 30 November 1938 Czechoslovakia ceded to Poland small patches of land in Spiš and Orava regions.

== Impacts ==
=== Slovak–Hungarian relations ===
Tiso took the result personally, especially because he had failed to arrange the evacuation of Košice. He announced the results of the award on the radio late in the evening and blamed the central government for its long-term policy but accepted the result. (Note: "Superpowers decided: we cannot do anything but lower our heads and work. However, nobody cannot stop us to say to the whole world that injustice has been committed against the Slovak nation. According to the Trianon dictat only 6% of Hungarians had to live in Slovakia, but according to new borders of Slovakia nearly 20% of Slovaks will live in Hungary". Fabricius 2007, p. 25.)

The First Vienna Award finally refuted interwar Hungarian propaganda that "Slovak brothers" dreamed about returning to the 1000-year Hungarian Empire and could not openly declare their opinion under Czech domination. It also led to worsening anti-Hungarian sentiment in Slovakia. Shortly after the award had been announced, János Esterházy, a leader of the Hungarian minority in Slovakia, proposed for Hungary to return to Slovakia 1000 km^{2} of the territory that Hungary had received, predominantly Slovak lands between Šurany (Nagysurány) and Palárikovo (Tótmegyer), to ensure the long-term peaceful co-existence between both nations. His proposal was not accepted by the Hungarian government. The obvious violation of the ethnic balance between the two countries' minorities, which had repeatedly been endorsed years earlier by Hungary, and the short period between the award and a Hungarian attack against Slovakia in March 1939, caused anti-Hungarian sentiment and social movements to become a significant unifying element for Slovaks during the Second World War. Anti-Hungarian demonstrations were held on each anniversary of the award in which anti-Hungarian slogans were shouted and Hungarian houses or cultural institutions were damaged. On the third anniversary, a mob furious at the shooting of Slovaks by Hungarian police in Komjatice destroyed the Hungarian Cultural House.

=== Radicalisation of Central Europe ===
Hungary annulled Point 4 of Article 27 of the Treaty of Trianon, which committed it to respect the new borders that were defined by the treaty. According to Deák, Hungary also violated Articles 48 and 49 of the treaty, which guaranteed independence and rights of new Czechoslovak state. In addition to territorial gains based on the First Vienna Award, Hungary ignored the results of the arbitration and tried to annex Carpathian Ruthenia few weeks later.

From the Middle Ages to well into the 18th century, Hungary and Poland had shared a historic common border and had always enjoyed good relations. After the Munich Agreement on September 30, 1938, both countries had worked together to restore their historic common border. A step toward their goal was realised with the First Vienna Award (November 2, 1938).

Under pressure from Hitler, Slovakia declared total independence on March 14, 1939, and Czechoslovakia ceased to exist. Two days earlier, Hitler had given Hungary permission to occupy the rest of Carpatho-Ruthenia within 24 hours but to abstain from attempting to annex the remainder of Slovakia, which Hitler wanted to turn into a strategically located German ally, especially for his planned invasion of Poland. On March 14–15, what remained of Carpatho-Ruthenia declared its independence as Carpatho-Ukraine, and shortly afterward, between March 15 and 18, it was occupied by Hungary. After occupying Carpatho-Ukraine, Hungary occupied a small amount of Slovakia on March 15. Seeing no substantial reaction, Hungary on March 23 launched a larger attack on eastern Slovakia. The plan was to "advance as far west as possible". After a short Slovak-Hungarian War, with several Hungarian air raids, such as March 24 on Spišská Nová Ves, Hungary was forced by Germany to stop and negotiate. The negotiations (March 27 -April 4) gave Hungary further territories in Eastern Slovakia (1,897 km^{2}) with 69,630 inhabitants, almost all of whom were Slovaks or Rusyns. Unlike the earlier Vienna Award, the annexed territories were not justified on ethnic grounds. (The Hungarians justified it under the grounds that the Vienna Award had been an arbitration between Hungary and Czechoslovakia and that the latter had ceased to exist a few days earlier.)

Until mid-March 1939, Germany had considered that "for military reasons a common Hungarian-Polish frontier was undesirable". Indeed, Hitler had warned Hungary not to touch the remainder of Slovakia when he authorized Hungary to occupy the rest of Carpathian Ruthenia in March 1939. He meant to use Slovakia as a staging ground for his planned invasion of Poland. In March 1939, Hitler changed his mind on the common Hungarian-Polish frontier and decided to betray Germany's ally, the Organization of Ukrainian Nationalists, which had already in 1938 begun organising Ukrainian military units in a sich outside Uzhhorod under German tutelage. Polish political and military authorities saw the sich as a danger to the neighbouring southeastern Poland, with its largely Ukrainian population. Hitler, however, was concerned that if a Ukrainian army that was organised in Carpathian Rus' accompanied German forces invading the Soviet Union, Ukrainian nationalists would insist on the establishment of an independent Ukraine. Hitler, who had his own plans for the natural and farming resources of Ukraine, did not want to have to deal with an independent Ukrainian government.

Hitler soon had cause to regret his decision regarding the fate of Carpatho-Ukraine. In six months, during his 1939 invasion of Poland, the common Hungarian-Polish border would become of major importance when Horthy's government, because of the long friendship between Poles and Hungarians and as a matter of Hungarian honour, declined Hitler's request to transit German forces across Carpathian Rus' into southeastern Poland to speed Poland's conquest. That, in turn, allowed the Polish government and tens of thousands of Polish military personnel to escape into neighbouring Hungary and Romania and then to France and French-mandated Syria to carry on operations as the third-strongest Allied belligerent, after Britain and France. Also, for a time, Polish and British intelligence agents and couriers, including the notable Krystyna Skarbek, used Hungary's Carpathian Rus' as a route across the Carpathian Mountains to and from Poland.

=== Life in redeemed territory ===
==== Demographics ====
Slovaks in the redeemed territory joined the existing Slovak minority in Hungary, but only about 60,000 Hungarians remained in Slovakia. The new border did not respect the principle of ethnic borders requested by Hungary as a "correction of injustices of Treaty of Trianon" or the Hungarian census of 1910. The most obvious violations of the ethnic principle occurred in areas around Nové Zámky–Vráble–Hurbanovo, the area around Jelšava and the area around Košice. Only 8 of 79 villages around Košice had a Hungarian-majority population, besides the 42,245 Slovaks in Košice.

Hungary performed a new census in the redeemed territory in December 1938. The census took place in an atmosphere of expulsions, persecutions, restrictions of civil rights and psychological coercion by the Hungarian authorities. In addition, it was performed under direct control of military bodies and violated several principles for taking a census of nationalities. According to the official results, the population consisted of 86.5% Hungarians and 9.8% Slovaks. The total size of Slovak population was reduced to 121,603, with 67 villages losing their Slovak majority, the Slovak population decreasing by 74,100 and the Hungarian population increased by 77,715. Contrary to the Czechoslovak census of 1930, the Hungarian census again counted not the nationality declared by citizens but the "mother tongue" registered by census commissars, as had the Hungarian census from 1910. The two censuses significantly differed in the view on Jewish population. In Czechoslovakia, Jews were allowed to declare separate Jewish nationality, but in the Hungarian census, they could not put their own mother tongue, and their real numbers can be estimated only by their declared religion.

For a full comparison of the censuses, it is necessary to take into account the population transfer after the border change (voluntary or forced), the demographic changes during the previous 20 years of Czechoslovakia (such as the arrival of Czechoslovak state employees and colonists and natural domestic migration) and the bilingualism of the population and the reliability of previous statistics, particularly of the 1910 census from the peak of Magyarization.

==== First deportations of Jews ====
The Vienna Award escalated in Slovakia into the first deportations of Jews. Tiso and his collaborators looked for a scapegoat, which was found in Jews because of their demonstration in favour of Bratislava to be part of Hungary on the evening before the arbitration. Between November 4 and 5, 1938, Slovakia's autonomous government deported 7,500 Jews into the new Hungarian-Slovak border. Tiso justified the step as "letting them go where they wanted". Hungary refused to accept them, who included some who were elderly or children, and the deported Jews found themselves imprisoned in no man's land during the cold autumn weather. Hundreds of Jews stayed in a camp in Veľký Kýr and Miloslavov, where they were unable to move to residences in either Slovakia or Hungary.

==== Persecutions against other non-Hungarians ====
The non-Hungarians in the territory ceded by the First Vienna Award can be divided into three groups: those who left already before the Award came into force, those who remained in their place during the war until it was reintegrated to Czechoslovakia and those who were expelled from the region. The Czechoslovak press reported after the Munich Agreement that border adjustments with Hungary were imminent and so the Czechoslovaks had five weeks to decide whether they stayed or left. According to Janics, the officials and farmers who opted to move out (81,000 people) were given administrative, military and public safety support and were provided road vehicles and railway wagons to transport their property. Deák estimates the number of state employees and Czech colonists who left the territory before the arrival of the Hungarian Army as half, and the total number of Slovaks who left the territory before December 1938 (voluntarily or forcibly) is unknown and can be estimated only by comparison of the censuses of 1930 and 1938 and the assumed population growth. His estimate has about 50,000 Slovaks.

From the start, Hungary breached several points of the agreement on the evacuation and the transfer of territory, particularly its commitment to preventing violence on territory under its administration. Hungarian nationalism considered the Czech and Slovak colonists, who had obtained their lands in the ethnic Hungarian territories by the nationalist Czechoslovak land reform, as aliens. Some of the colonists left before the award, and others stayed where they were, but a number of them were expelled by force and intimidation. Tilkovszky puts the number of expelled families at 647.

Deák documents that the expulsion of "colonists" was not realised as an arbitrary act of nationalists but that the Hungarian General Staff gave an order to expel all Slovak and Czech colonists on November 5, 1938, which also included their family members and descendants. On November 11, 1938, the Hungarian General Staff issued a new edict, which imposed measures against colonists, ordered their immediate expulsion and defined them as enemies of the state. The organised persecution of non-Hungarian population was based on those orders. Soldiers and police could freely perform home inspections without needing official authorisation and could confiscate stocks of food, livestock and grain. The term "colonists" covered agricultural colonists but was interpreted by the Hungarian government as any non-Hungarians that had settled in the concerning territories since 1918 for any reason, even for those who declared to have Hungarian nationality. Beside Slovaks, Moravians and Czechs, the forced expulsions affected Germans. Forced expulsions were frequently preceded by arrest and imprisonment related to physical torture. In others, it involved transportation to border with Czechoslovakia with military assistance.

The colonists were followed by state employees, Slovak farmers (including those who inherited land or bought it in a standard legal way with their own money) and then anybody denoted as an unreliable. Lists of unreliable persons had been prepared by members of the Hungarian United Party before the First Vienna Award. The measures took place violently, with shooting, casualties and the looting of Slovak and Czech stores and property. Military bodies usually did not react to complaints, or they openly declared that they would not do anything against offenders and violence.

Under such conditions, many Slovaks and Czechs decided to leave the territory. In addition, they signed official statement that they had moved voluntarily and all of their property, even for items that were allowed to be exported, was passed into the ownership of Hungary. In Gbelce (Köbölkút), three Czech colonists were shot dead and one hanged. Civil servants had to leave the territory within 48 hours and were replaced by those from Hungary.

As a reaction to the expulsion of colonists, Czechoslovakia started to take countermeasures and declared that further expelled civilians would be settled on land belonging to members of the Hungarian minority and Hungarian citizens (the Hungarian aristocracy owned 50,000 ha of agricultural land and 14,000 ha of woods in Slovakia). The Hungarian government rapidly changed its approach, and the commission that had to resolve problems of colonists met from Hungarian initiative on December 1, 1938. Hungary promised that it would stop mass expulsions and that it was open to negotiations on property issues.

Changes in the Hungarian policy were driven by several factors. The new Hungarian foreign minister, István Csáky, stated that the Hungarian steps had not had the expected effects but had increased anti-Hungarian sentiment, caused disillusionment of the last supporters of Hungary and pushed the Slovak government into co-operation with the central Czechoslovak government. The Hungarian government continued the expulsions but claimed that they were not mass expulsions, that Slovaks and Czechs had left the territory voluntarily and that Hungary had not forced them to do so.

I can't speak Slovak language but Slavic languages are not unknown to me, because I learnt Croatian during the beautiful days spent in the navy. I am greeting you with hot love, you who returned today back to your thousand years old motherland. You have changed this land to the fertile soil together with us and you have also defended it with us. Be sure, that emphatic love of the whole Hungarian nation will guarantee you not only the increase of your living standard but also full freedom of Slovak language and culture.

— Miklós Horthy, Košice, November 11, 1938.

Although Miklós Horthy had promised to guarantee the freedom of the Slovak language and culture in the redeemed territories, Hungary failed to protect its new minorities. The promise of the Slovak government of "adequate help and protection" of its non-Hungarian citizens and its recommendation to stay in the territory the live were also naive and counterproductive and led to unnecessary losses of lives and property.

All non-Hungarian organizations were dissolved, and their property was confiscated or given to Hungarian organisations. In Nové Zámky (Érsekújvár), Jewish citizens were interned in a colony abandoned by Slovaks and Czechs shortly after the event, Jewish lease agreements were cancelled and office spaces were given to Christians.

About 150 schools had been built by the Slovak League, and they were declared to be the property of the Hungarian state. According to Jablonický, Deák and other authors, 862 of 1,119 teachers lost their jobs by the end of 1938, and others followed in the next years. Janics put the total number of teachers at 1,088 and added that most of them had left voluntarily when the award came into effect. In early 1939, the Slovak government protested the expulsion of Slovak teachers and the liquidation of Slovak schools and threatened reciprocal measures against Hungarian-minority schools if Hungary's policy continued.

The expulsion of teachers was often related to violence and public degradation. In Lučenec (Losonc), Hungary deported 54 Slovak teachers on the demarcation line (Deák documents further examples of steps that eliminated Slovak schools). Slovaks lost 386 primary schools, attended by 45,709 Slovak children, and 29 council schools ("burgher schools"), attended by 10,750 children. Four grammar school were closed in Košice (Kassa) and six in other towns. The remaining Slovak government employees, such as railway workers, were forced to enroll their children into Hungarian schools. In several Slovak villages, police dispersed parents' associations, and parents who demanded Slovak schools were beaten. Parents from Ruskov (Regeteruszka) and Blažice (Balogd) who demanded Slovak schools were imprisoned for two weeks. In several places, Hungarian police burned Slovak school supplies, requested for them to be burned by the school director or simply confiscated them. (Note: Trstená pri Hornáde, Nižná Myšeľ, Čaňa, Ždaňa.)

However, that pressure was generally not sufficient. For instance, in Šurany (Nagysurány), Slovaks excluded from their community anybody who had enrolled children to Hungarian schools. The overcrowding of Hungarian classes with Slovaks had a negative impact on the quality of education of local Hungarian population.

The slow adoption of Hungarian confirmed that the idea of the Hungarian state had remained fictitious for Slovaks. In the fall of 1943, the Hungarian government came to the conclusion that direct Magyarization trends would be replaced by educational activities in the mother tongue of minorities. The plan did not take place because of Hungary was later occupied by Germany.

==== Social rights and economy ====
The Hungarian government ordered the revision of trade licences for Jews in the redeemed territory but not for the rest of Hungary. That made 80% of Jews lose their license with significant impact on economic life. In towns like Košice (Kassa), Nové Zámky (Érsekújvár) and Lučenec (Losonc), every second shop was closed.

Slovakia lost 41% of its agricultural soil, which produced approximately 80% of products required for food supply. That was a notable loss for Slovakia but was not a clear benefit for Hungary. The existing problems with overproduction caused problems for local farmers and for Hungary's economic policy. Only half of Southern Slovakia's 400,000 tons of wheat production was used locally, and the other half had no consumers. The border between the redeemed territories and Hungary proper was closed during the military administration and so distribution in that direction was impossible. (Note: Any package over 5 kg required special permission.) The situation improved only partially during the civilian administration, when grain and livestock prices remained low. The Hungarian government tried to improve the situation by state intervention purchases, but that failed to resolve the long-term implications of the overproduction. The prices of agricultural goods decreased by 20–30%. Existing cartels in Hungary had limited possibilities to grow the most profitable crops. That particularly included sugar beets and tobacco, which became constrained, with worsening conditions for the farmers growing such crops. That resulted in The Economic Association of Nitra County demanding the right "to grow sugar beet under the same conditions as during Czech rule". That request was refused. On February 24, 1939, the government cabinet restricted growing of red pepper only to limited areas around Nové Zámky (Érsekújvár).

Czechoslovakia had provided more job opportunities by constructing roads, regulating rivers and building projects. Those were stopped after the arbitration. Unemployment rates increased, and unlike Czechoslovakia, Hungary did not provide any unemployment benefits or state health insurance for workers in agriculture. Retirement and disability pensions were also lower. Unemployed workers who had received support under Czechoslovak rule requested the same from Hungary. Salaries and working conditions had worsened, but taxes had increased. The exchange rate was disadvantageous for local citizens (7-1) and automatically decreased salaries by 20%. Hungarian soldiers profited from the exchange rate and bought up the remaining cheap Czechoslovak goods at the expense of their sellers. New goods from Hungary had become 20–30% more expensive. Electricity, the radio and railway tickets had also become also more expensive.

Local Hungarians had difficulties understanding the problems because interwar propaganda had portrayed the reunification of the ethnic Hungarian territories as beneficial for both parties. However, in many aspects, Czechoslovakia had given Hungarians more civic and social rights than Hungary would just a year later. The Hungarian government answered by appealing to Hungarian patriotism. (Note: "National feeling is not increased or decreased by price of shoelaces or the cost of grain,... national feeling... is above material factors and driven by higher principles".) In April 1939, Hungarian professors wrote demands to the Hungarian government and protested price increases and their bad social situation.

Social problems on the concerning territories were discussed in the cabinet meeting on December 22, 1939. Interior Minister Ferenc Keresztes-Fischer who was responsible for issues of common goods, the health service and social policy, proposed a solution based on unification. Upper Country Minister Andor Jaross disagreed with that solution and proposed providing the Czechoslovak welfare system for those in the redeemed areas for a transitional period but had no objections to decreasing it to the Hungarian level.

The cabinet finally agreed on a compromise. The elimination of Czechoslovak laws from the acquired territories was understood as a duty but had to be done gradually. The first step was to decrease the value of a retirement pension from its Czechoslovak value (150 pengő) to its Hungarian value (60 pengő) through a transition value of 120 pengő. Health insurance for workers in agriculture was preserved in the form of Czechoslovak regulation for the moment, but it was changed from compulsory to voluntary. In Slovakia, the Czechoslovak system of welfare was preserved after the breakup of Czechoslovakia.

== Nullification ==
The Vienna Award was later ruled under international law to be null and void, like the Munich Agreement, since the Czechoslovak government had accepted arbitration under a presumed threat from both arbiters (Nazi Germany and Fascist Italy) and under heavy influence from Hungarian demands.

On December 11, 1940, the British Foreign Office confirmed to the Czechoslovak government that Britain was not bound to the Munich Agreement regarding Czechoslovak borders. It interpreted the Munich Agreement to have been signed properly but to have become invalid on March 15, 1939. Negotiations on the British standpoint continued until halfway into 1942. On June 9, 1942, Soviet Foreign Minister Vyacheslav Molotov confirmed the restoration of Czechoslovakia to its borders before the Munich Agreement. On September 26, 1944, Italian Foreign Minister Carlo Sforza informed a Czechoslovak representative that Italy had considered the Munich Agreement and the First Vienna Award to have been invalid from the start. This was confirmed in the peace treaty with Hungary, which was signed February 10, 1947. The treaty went on to declare that the border between Hungary and Czechoslovakia was to be fixed along the former frontier between Hungary and Czechoslovakia as it existed on January 1, 1938, except for three villages south of Bratislava, which were given as a bridgehead to Czechoslovakia.

== Postwar persecutions ==
The Munich Agreement, the First Vienna Award and the participation of minority parties in the breakup of Czechoslovakia resulted in the redefinition of postwar Czechoslovak minority policy. Prewar Czechoslovakia had guaranteed a relatively large number of minority rights, with Hungarians having more civic and social rights than in Hungary, but Hungarians became the target of serious discrimination after the war. The Hungarian question had to be resolved by a population exchange between Czechoslovakia and Hungary, Slovakization, and deportations of Hungarians in Czechoslovakia (particularly to the Sudetenland).

The Government Program of Košice (April 5, 1945) accepted the principle of collective guilt for the German and Hungarian minorities. Articles X and XI ordered the seizure of their property, and Article XV the closure of minority schools. Measures against the minorities were reasoned by the "terrible experience of Czechs and Slovaks with German and Hungarian minorities, which largely become a willing tool in the services of aggressive policy from outside; and especially Czechoslovak Germans cooperated directly in the extermination campaign against the Czech and Slovak nation". The government program was followed by series of regulations in the same spirit. Except for antifascist fighters, the Hungarians lost their Czechoslovak citizenship by a presidential decree on August 2, 1945. "About amnesty for acts performed during anti-fascistic fight" prevented punishment of the cruelest crimes against the Hungarian minority. The two countries had a population exchange (68,407 Hungarians and 59,774 Slovaks). A further 31,780 Hungarians were expelled because they had settled in the territories only after the Vienna Award.

The communist coup in Czechoslovakia in February 1948 did not immediately improve the status of Hungarians, but relationships began to normalise in the second half of 1948. During his visit to Budapest on March 15, 1948, the chairman of the Czechoslovak Constitutional National Assembly declared that the Hungarian people were not responsible for the past oppression of Slovaks, the crimes of Hungarian noblemen or the regime of Miklós Horthy. In October 1948, the Czechoslovak parliament restored Czechoslovak citizenship to Hungarians who were residents in Slovakia on November 1, 1938, and had not been convicted of crimes. The issue of the return of property disappeared in the context of communist collectivisation and so became irrelevant.

On April 16, 1949, the two countries signed an agreement on friendship and co-operation. On July 25, 1949, the Hungarian government committed to return artistic and historical relics that had been seized after the First Vienna Award. The final agreement was signed on November 11, 1951, with a validity of ten years but was not fully respected.

== See also ==
- Second Vienna Award
- Carpathian Rus
- German occupation of Czechoslovakia
- Carpatho-Ukraine
- Molotov–Ribbentrop Pact
- Salzburg Conference

== Sources ==
- Piahanau, Aliaksandr. Slovak-Hungarian relations in the mirror of the Soviet-German conflictive alliance (1939–1941), in: Prague Papers on the History of International Relations 2 (2012): 144 – 163. https://halshs.archives-ouvertes.fr/halshs-01261457/document
- Bystrický, Valerián (2008). "Vnútropolitický ohlas na zmeny hraníc v roku 1938". In Šmihula, Daniel (ed.). Viedenská arbitráž v roku 1938 a jej európske súvislosti [Vienna Award in 1938 and its European context] (in Slovak). Bratislava: Ševt. ISBN 978-80-8106-009-0.
- Čaplovič, Miloslav (2008). "Čs. branná moc po Mníchove: náčrt problematiky (október 1938 - marec 1939)". Viedenská arbitráž v roku 1938 a jej európske súvislosti : zborník príspevkov z vedeckej konferencie konanej v Bratislave 10. novembra 2008. Bratislava: Vojenský historický ústav. ISBN 978-80-8106-009-0.
- Chorvát, Peter (2008). "Maďarské kráľovské hovédskto vs. československé opevnenia – k problémom interacie" [Royal Hungarian Army vs. Czechoslovak fortifications – about interaction problems]. Vojenská história (in Slovak). 1. Vojenský historický ústav.
- Deák, Ladislav (1991). Hra o Slovensko [The Game for Slovakia] (in Slovak). Bratislava: Slovak Academy of Sciences. ISBN 80-224-0370-9.
- Deák, Ladislav (1998). Viedenská arbitráž – "Mníchov pre Slovensko" [Vienna Award – "Munich for Slovakia"] (in Slovak). Bratislava: Korene. ISBN 80-967587-7-2.
- Deák, Ladislav (2002). Viedenská arbitráž 2. November 1938. Dokumenty, zv. 1 (20. september – 2. november 1938) [Vienna Award of November 2, 1938: Documents, volume 1 (September 20 – November 2, 1938)] (in Slovak). Martin: Matica Slovenská.
- Deák, Ladislav (2003). Viedenská arbitráž 2. November 1938. Dokumenty, Okupácia, zv. 2 (2. november 1938 – 14. marec 1939) [Vienna Award of November 2, 1938: Documents, Occupation, volume 2 (November 2, 1938 – March 14, 1939)] (in Slovak). Martin: Matica Slovenská.
- Deák, Ladislav (2008). "Medzinárodno-politické súvislosti Viedenskej arbitráže a dôsledky pre južné SLovensko". Viedenská arbitráž v roku 1938 a jej európske súvislosti : zborník príspevkov z vedeckej konferencie konanej v Bratislave 10. novembra 2008. Bratislava: Vojenský historický ústav. pp. 9–23. ISBN 978-80-8106-009-0.
- Fabricius, Miroslav (2007). Jozef Tiso – Prejavy a články (1938–1944) [Jozef Tiso – Speeches and articles (1938–1944)] (in Slovak). Bratislava: AEPress. ISBN 978-80-88880-46-2.
- Janek, István (March 2012). "János Esterházy v histórii stredovýchodnej Európy" [János Esterházy in the history of central-eastern Europe]. Historická revue (in Slovak). 3.
- Jablonický, Viliam (2011). "Represie na nemaďarskom obyvateľstve na okupovanom južnom Slovensku po roku 1938 a ich odraz v spoločenskom a kultúrnom povedomí" [Repressions against non-Hungarian population in occupied southern Slovakia after 1938 and their reflection in social and cultural awareness]. In Mitáč, Ján (ed.). Juh Slovenska po Viedeňskej arbitráži 1938–1945 [Southern Slovakia after the First Vienna Award 1938–1945] (in Slovak). Bratislava: Ústav pamäti národa. ISBN 978-80-89335-45-9.
- Jesenský, Marcel (2014). The Slovak–Polish Border, 1918–1947. Palgrave Macmillan. ISBN 978-1-137-44964-1.
- Klimko, Jozef (2008). "Viedenská arbitráž a súčasnosť" [Vienna Award and presence]. In Šmihula, Daniel (ed.). Viedenská arbitráž v roku 1938 a jej európske súvislosti [Vienna Award in 1938 and its European context] (in Slovak). Bratislava: Ševt. ISBN 978-80-8106-009-0.
- Lacko, Martin (2008). Slovenská republika 1939–1945 (in Slovak). Bratislava: Perfekt. ISBN 978-80-8046-408-0.
- Mitáč, Ján (2011). "Krvavý incident v Šuranoch na Vianoce 1938 v spomienkach obyvateľov mesta Šurany" [Bloody incident in Šurany on Christmas 1938 in the memories of citizens of Šurany]. In Mitáč, Ján (ed.). Juh Slovenska po Viedeňskej arbitráži 1938–1945 [Southern Slovakia after the First Vienna Award 1938–1945] (in Slovak). Bratislava: Ústav pamäti národa. ISBN 978-80-89335-45-9.
- Mitáč, Ján; Štofková, Denisa (2012). "Udalosti v Lučenci po Viedenskej arbitráži a ich dopad na obyvateľstvo mesta a blízkeho okolia" [Events in Lučenec after the Vienna Award, and their impact on the population of the town and surrounding area] (PDF). Pamäť národa (in Slovak). 1. Ústav pamäti národa.
- Nižňanský, Eduard (2000). Prvé deportácie židov z územia Slovenska v novembri 1938 a úloha Jozefa Falátha a Adolfa Eichmanna [The first deportation of Jews from territory of Slovakia in November 1938 and role of Jozef Faláth and Adolf Eichmann] (in Slovak). Bratislava: Zing Print. ISBN 80-88997-03-8.
- Pástor, Zoltán (2011). Slováci a Maďari [Slovaks and Hungarians] (in Slovak). Martin: Matica Slovenská. ISBN 978-80-8128-004-7.
- Šutaj, Štefan (2005). Nútené presídlenie Maďarov do Čiech [Forced transfer of Hungarians to the Czech Lands] (in Slovak). Prešov: Univerzum. ISBN 80-89046-29-0.
- Tilkovszky, Loránt (1972). Južné Slovensko v rokoch 1938–1945 [Southern Slovakia during the years 1938–1945] (in Slovak). Bratislava: Vydavateľstvo Slovenskej akadémie vied.
- Vrábel, Ferdinad (2011). "Náprava "krív" z Trianonu? Niekoľko epizód z obsadzovania južného Slovenska maďarským vojskom z v novembri 1938" [Correction od "injustices" of Trianon? Several episodes from occupation by southern SLovakia by Hungarian army in November 1938]. In Mitáč, Ján (ed.). Juh Slovenska po Viedeňskej arbitráži 1938–1945 [Southern Slovakia after the First Vienna Award 1938–1945] (in Slovak). Bratislava: Ústav pamäti národa. ISBN 978-80-89335-45-9.
- Janics, Kálmán (1979). A hontalanság évei (in Hungarian). Madách Kiadó.
- Deák, Ladislav, Hungary's game for Slovakia, Slovak Academy of Sciences, 1996. (translation of Hra o Slovensko)
- Encyklopédia Slovenska (Encyclopedia of Slovakia), vol. VI, Slovak Academy of Sciences, 1982.
- Jerzy Kupliński, "Polskie działania dywersyjne na Ukrainie Zakarpackiej w 1938 r." ("Polish 1938 Covert Operations in Transcarpathian Ukraine"), Wojskowy Przegląd Historyczny (Military Historical Review), no. 4, 1996.
- Kronika Slovenska (Chronicle of Slovakia), vol. II, Fortuna Print Praha, 1999.
- Józef Kasparek, "Poland's 1938 Covert Operations in Ruthenia", East European Quarterly", vol. XXIII, no. 3 (September 1989), pp. 365–73.
- Józef Kasparek, Przepust karpacki: tajna akcja polskiego wywiadu (The Carpathian Bridge: a Covert Polish Intelligence Operation), Warszawa, Wydawnictwo Czasopism i Książek Technicznych SIGMA NOT, 1992, ISBN 83-85001-96-4.
- Edmund Charaszkiewicz, "Referat o działaniach dywersyjnych na Rusi Karpackiej" ("Report on Covert Operations in Carpathian Rus"), in Zbiór dokumentów ppłk. Edmunda Charaszkiewicza (Collection of Documents by Lt. Col. Edmund Charaszkiewicz), opracowanie, wstęp i przypisy (edited, with introduction and notes by) Andrzej Grzywacz, Marcin Kwiecień, Grzegorz Mazur, Kraków, Księgarnia Akademicka, 2000, ISBN 83-7188-449-4, pp. 106–30.
- Paweł Samuś, Kazimierz Badziak, Giennadij Matwiejew, Akcja "Łom": polskie działania dywersyjne na Rusi Zakarpackiej w świetle dokumentów Oddziału II Sztabu Głównego WP (Operation Crowbar: Polish Covert Operations in Transcarpathian Rus in Light of Documents of Section II of the Polish General Staff), Warsaw, Adiutor, 1998.
- Tadeusz A. Olszański, "Akcja Łom" ("Operation Crowbar"), Płaj: Almanach Karpacki, no. 21 (jesień [autumn] 2000).
- Dariusz Dąbrowski, "Rzeczpospolita Polska wobec kwestii Rusi Zakarpackiej (Podkarpackiej) 1938–1939" ("The Polish Republic and the Transcarpathian (Subcarpathian) Rus Question in 1938–39"), Europejskie Centrum Edukacyjne (European Educational Center), Toruń, 2007, ISBN 978-83-60738-04-7.
- Bill Tarkulich, Additional Annexation of Eastern Slovakia by Hungary, 23–26 March 1939. Sources: Edward Chaszar: The Czechoslovak-Hungarian Border Dispute of 1938 Veress, Laura-Louis: Clear the Line – Hungary's Struggle to Leave the Axis During the Second World War League of Nations Archives, Chronology 1939: Slovakian and Carpatho-Ukrainian Independence Palais des Nations, CH-1211, Geneva 10, Switzerland; Center for the Study of Global Change, 201 N. Indiana Avenue, Bloomington, Indiana
- Text of the first arbitral award of Vienna, from a UN website
- Text of the first arbitral award of Vienna
- Edward Chaszar: The Czechoslovak-Hungarian Border Dispute of 1938
