= Kerno =

Kerno may refer to:

- Kerno, New South Wales, Australia, a locality and civil parish
- Ivan S. Kerno (1891–1961), Czechoslovak lawyer and diplomat

== See also ==
- Kernos, ancient Greek pottery
- Kern (disambiguation)
