= Vladimír Goněc =

Vladimír Goněc, PhDr., Dr.Sc. Jean Monnet Chair (born 12 March 1950, Brno) is a Czech and Slovak historian and political scientist. He worked at the Institute of Political Sciences of the Slovak Academy of Sciences in Bratislava, Slovak Republic (till 2021), and at the Faculty of Arts of the Charles University in Prague, Czech Republic.

== Selected works ==
- Pan-Europe beside Russia. Russia against Pan-Europe. Pan-Europeans in Defence against Russia. In Russia in Czech Historiography: Studies published by the Prague Group of Russian history specialists: on the occasion of the birthdays of group members Zdeněk Sládek, Vladislav Moulis and Václav Veber. 1. vyd. Prague: National Library of Czech Republic, 2002. s. 56–74. ISBN 80-7050-379-3.
- Hubert Ripka en exil à Londres: Projets pour l'Europe unie d'après-guerre. In Inventor l'Europe. Histoire nouvelle des groupes d'influence et des auteurs de l'unité européenne. 1. vyd. Bruxelles-Bern-Berlin-Frankfurt/M-New Yo: P.I.E. - Peter Lang, 2003. s. 157–178, 22 s. Euroclio, 27. ISBN 90-5201-170-2.
- In Between Enthusiasm and Pragmatism: How To Construct Europe? (ed.). 1. vyd. Brno: Masarykova univerzita, 2007. 206 s. Outlines on the European ideas, federalism and... ISBN 978-80-210-4498-2.
- First programmes of Council of Free Czechoslovakia on European Politics. In In Between Enthusiasm and Pragmatism: How To Construct Europe? 1. vyd. Brno: Masarykova univerzita, 2008. s. 121–134, 14 s. Dějiny evropské integrace, 10. ISBN 978-80-210-4498-2.
- Milan Hodža before "Milan Hodža". His early schemes and concepts of Europe. In In Between Enthusiasm and Pragmatism: How To Construct Europe? 1. vyd. Brno: Masarykova univerzita, 2008. s. 66–112, 47 s. Dějiny evropské integrace, 10. ISBN 978-80-210-4498-2.
- An Eastern Schuman Plan? Project of Central and East European Coal and Steel and Political Community (1953). 1. vyd. Brno: Masaryk University Press, 2009. 170 s. Outlines on the European Ideas, Federalism ..., 3. ISBN 978-80-210-4932-1.
