= Kamil Krofta =

Czechoslovak politician

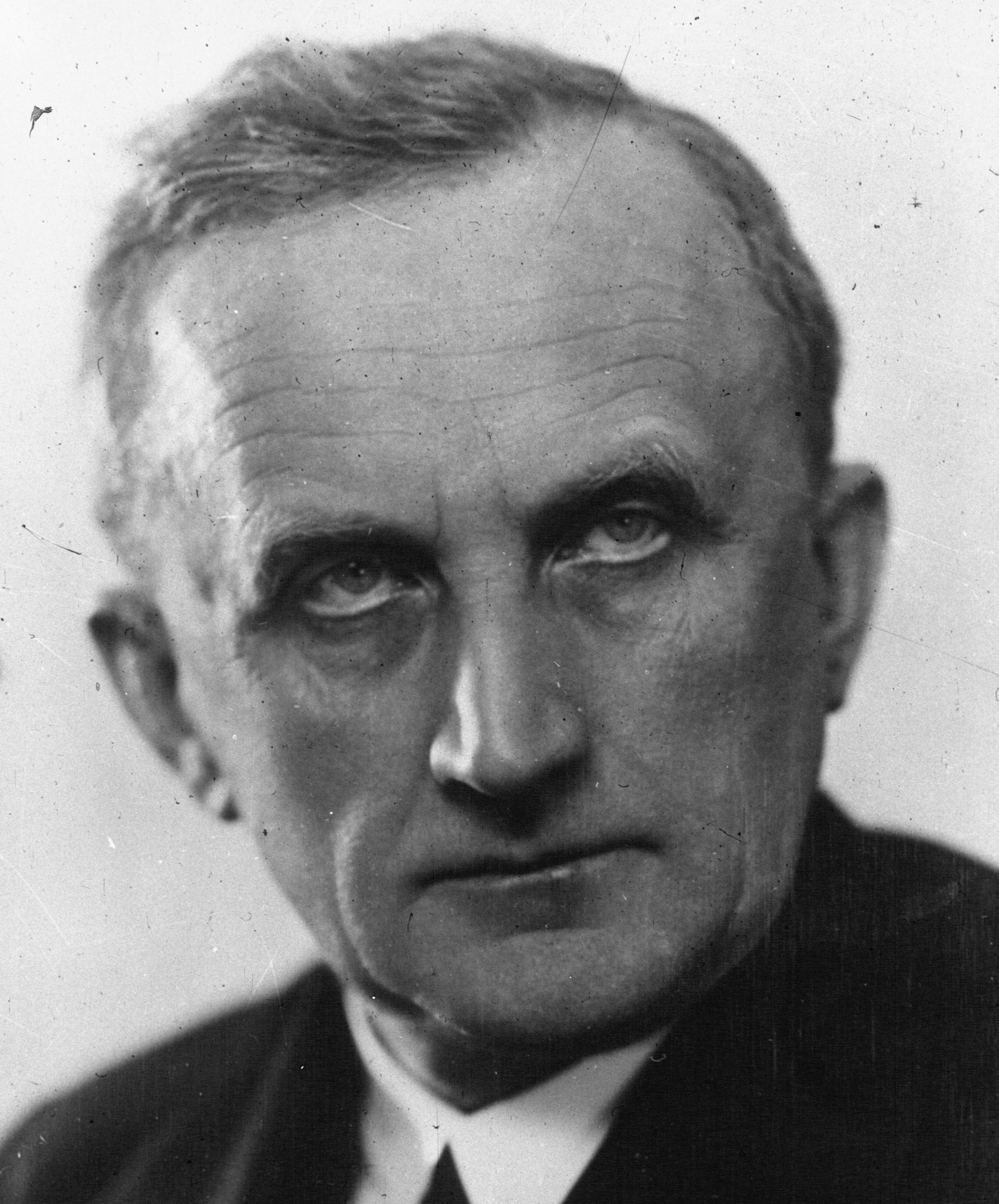
- Kamil Krofta in 1936

Minister of Foreign Affairs of Czechoslovakia
- In office 29 February 1936 – 4 October 1938
- Prime Minister: Milan Hodža
- Preceded by: Milan Hodža
- Succeeded by: František Chvalkovský

Personal details
- Born: 17 July 1876 Plzeň, Austria-Hungary
- Died: 16 August 1945 (aged 69) Vráž, Czechoslovakia
- Occupation: Diplomat

Kamil Krofta (17 July 1876 – 16 August 1945) was a Czech historian and diplomat.

== Life and career ==
Born and schooled in Plzeň, he studied history in Prague starting in 1894, then from 1896 to 1899 in Vienna. From 1901 he worked at the National Archives. Beginning in 1911, he was a professor of Austrian (and later, Czech) history at Charles University, following the Jaroslav Goll school of thought. In his research, he focused on the late medieval and early Czech history, especially that of the peasantry as well as the church. He was prominent member of the Masonic Lodge Národ located in Prague, which was one of the founding lodges of the National Czechoslovak Grand Lodge in 1923.

In 1920, he became the first Czechoslovak envoy to The Vatican and was instrumental in the mutual recognition of both states. From 1922 until 1925, he resided as envoy in Vienna and lectured at the Comenius University in Bratislava. From 1925 to 1927 he was the Czechoslovak envoy in Berlin. After returning to Prague, he headed the Presidium of the Ministry of Foreign Affairs. Krofta was a key foreign policy advisor to Edvard Beneš who headed the Ministry until he became President of Czechoslovakia in 1935. Krofta served as Minister of Foreign Affairs from 29 February 1936 until 4 October 1938. He succeeded Milan Hodža.

Krofta became an active participant in the resistance during the German occupation of Czechoslovakia in World War II through the National Revolution Preparatory Assembly (Přípravný národní Revoluční výbor). In 1944, he was arrested and initially held at Pankrác Prison. He was later moved to the Small Fortress in Terezín and remained incarcerated until the camp was liberated in May 1945. He died in Prague a few months later as a result of the abuse and neglect during imprisonment. He was awarded Order of Saint Sava.

== Selected publications ==
- Kurie a církevní správa zemí českých v době předhusitské
- Řím a Čechy před hnutím husitským
- Historia Fratrum a Rozmlouvání starého Čecha s mladým rytířem
- Listy z náboženských dějin českých
- Bílá hora
- Přehled dějin selského stavu v Čechách a na Moravě
- Čtení o ústavních dějinách slovenských
- Čechové a Slováci před svým státním sjednocením
- Žižka a husitská revoluce
- Z dob naší první republiky
- Nesmrtelný národ
- Malé dějiny československé

Government offices
Preceded by Milan Hodža	Minister of Foreign Affairs of Czechoslovakia; 1936–1938	Succeeded by
