= Václav David =

Czechoslovak politician and diplomat

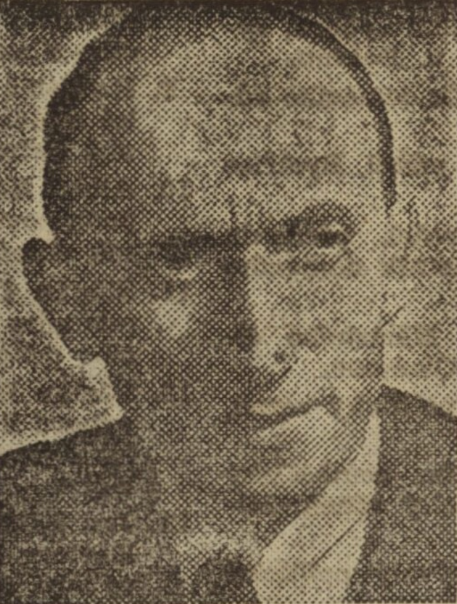
- Václav David, 1946
- Born: 23 September 1910; Studený, Kingdom of Bohemia, Austria-Hungary
- Died: 5 January 1996 (aged 85); Prague, Czech Republic
- Political party: Communist Party of Czechoslovakia

Václav David (23 September 1910 – 5 January 1996) was a Czechoslovak politician and diplomat. He was Czechoslovak foreign minister from 31 January 1953 to 8 April 1968. He was also Chairman of the Chamber of People from 1971 to 1986.

== See also ==
- List of Chairmen of the Chamber of the Nations (Czechoslovakia)
- List of Parliamentary Speakers in Europe in 1984
- Ministry of Foreign Affairs (Czechoslovakia)
- Viliam Široký
- Territorial evolution of Poland
