= Fedor Hodža =

Slovak politician (1912–1968)

Member of the Constituent National Assembly
- In office 1946–1948

Member of the Interim National Assembly
- In office 1945–1946

Personal details
- Born: 4 November 1912 Budapest, Austria-Hungary
- Died: 17 September 1968 (aged 55) New York City, U.S.
- Party: Democratic Party
- Parent: Milan Hodža
- Education: Charles University
- Occupation: Politician, lawyer

Fedor Hodža (4 November 1912, in Budapest – 17 September 1968, in New York City) was a Slovak politician and lawyer, the son of Milan Hodža.

He was a graduate of the Faculty of Law of the Charles University in Prague. He worked at the Ministry of Foreign Affairs in Prague (1938 – 1939).

During the World War II (more precisely 1938 – 1945) he lived in France and the UK, where he was Minister of Foreign Affairs and Agriculture of the Czechoslovak government in exile from 1940 to 1945. He participated, along with his father, in the creation of the Slovak National Council in Paris, which was supposed to be an opposition body to the exile policy of Edvard Beneš. After his father had left for the U.S., Fedor established close relationships with Beneš and even became a member of the Czechoslovak pseudo-parliament in exile ("State Council") in London in 1944.

In 1945, he was a member of the Slovak National Council. After World War II, from 1945 to 1948, he was a member of the Constituent National Assembly of Czechoslovakia and Secretary General of the Democratic Party.

In 1948, when the communists took power in Czechoslovakia, he emigrated to the U.S. There, as a member of the Council for a Free Czecho-Slovakia and of the Permanent Council of Slovak Democratic Exiles, he tried to achieve a re-establishment of democracy in Czechoslovakia, ruled by communists at that time. He died on 17 September 1968 in New York City.
