= Carpathian Sich =

Irregular military of Carpatho-Ukraine

Flag of Carpatho-Ukraine

Emblem of Carpatho-Ukraine

The National Defense Organization "Carpathian Sich" (Ukrainian: Організація народної оборони «Карпатська Січ», romanized: Orhanizacija narodnoï oborony «Karpats'ka Sič», also known as the Carpathian Sich) were Ukrainian nationalist militia soldiers of the short-lived state of Carpatho-Ukraine. They resisted the Hungarian invasion of Carpatho-Ukraine.

== History ==
The Carpathian Sich was formed on 9 November 1938. It was formed from units of the Ukrainian National Defense (organized in Uzhhorod by Ukrainian nationalists and headed by Stepan Rosokha). It was formed in opposition to the newly elected moderate Ukrainian nationalist prime minister of the Subcarpathian Autonomous Region within Czechoslovakia, Avgustyn Voloshyn. The Carpathian Sich was based in Khust which became a temporary capital since Uzhhorod, Mukacheve, and Berehove became part of Hungary according to the First Vienna Award. The organization was led by Dmytro Klympush and Ivan Rohach as a deputy of the first and performed paramilitary and police duties in adjustment with Czechoslovak armed forces. Although the Carpathian Sich's leaders were local Transcarpathian Ukrainian nationalists, most of its forces consisted of Ukrainian activists who crossed over the mountains from Galicia.

Inspired by Nazi German stormtroopers, the Carpathian Sich terrorized Jews and segments of the population that were pro-Russian: elements that the organization considered politically suspect.

On 22 January 1939, in Khust, the 20th anniversary festivities commemorating the 1919 Act Zluky (Act of Union) were held. On 13 March 1939, as Czechoslovakia fell apart, according to historians Paul R. Magocsi and Ivan Pop, the Sich prepared a coup against the Carpatho-Ukrainian government of Avgustyn Voloshyn with the encouragement of Nazi Germany's Schutzstaffel (SS) and attacked Czechoslovak troops. This resulted in the deaths of several Czechoslovak soldiers and many Sich members.

On 15 March 1939, Hungary invaded Carpatho-Ukraine. Avgustyn Voloshyn fled to Romania along with the Czech military rather than fight the invading Hungarian forces. The poorly armed forces of Carpatho-Ukraine, along with unarmed high school students and religious seminary students, were sent out by the Carpathian Sich; they were no match for the Hungarian military, which by March 18, 1939, had captured all of Carpatho-Ukraine. During these three days of fighting, hundreds of Carpathian Sich members died in battle while they slowly retreated until they came into conflict with Polish border guards; most died on the other side of the Carpathians.

== Numbers and organization ==
The leadership of the Carpathian Sich consisted of the command (commander, D. Klempush; deputy-commander, I. Roman) and the staff of officers. The organization's headquarters were in Khust, and there were 10 individual district commands with subordinate local sections, each of which conducted military and political training of several thousand men.

Five permanent garrisons conducted regular military training, and a number of the Sich soldiers served in the local police force and with the border guards. The Carpathian Sich adopted uniforms and ranks modeled on those of military formations in Ukraine during the struggle for independence (1917–20). It was also involved in cultural and educational work among the local population: its members organized the artistic group Letiucha Estrada and published the weekly Nastup, edited by Rosokha. The Sich held general and district conventions, the largest of which, consisting of several thousand participants, took place in Khust in February 1939.

A significant number of Galician Ukrainians (who entered illegally from Poland), together with emigrants from Dnieper Ukraine, joined the local Ukrainians as officers and soldiers in the permanent garrisons of the Carpathian Sich. After Carpatho-Ukraine declared independence, the Sich became its national army (Col Serhii O. Yefremov, commander; Col Mykhailo Kolodzinsky, chief of staff) and, in March 1939, mounted an armed resistance to the Hungarian invasion. At that time the strength of the Sich was about 2,000 men. Several hundred of them died in battles against the Czechs (13 March) and the Hungarians (14–18 March). Overwhelmed by the Hungarian army, the soldiers either retreated to Romania and Slovakia or hid in the mountains. The Romanians turned over many of the soldiers to the Hungarians, who in turn gave up many Galicians to the Poles and kept the remainder as prisoners, who were executed.

By February 1939 the Sich had up to 15,000 members, although only 2,000 were organized to fight. The Sich had five garrisons. Its barracks housed a total of 2,000 people, of whom only 300-400 were armed. Its ranks were Ataman (commander), Sotnyk (company (sotnya) commander), Chotar (platoon commander), Desiatnyk (corporal), Starshy Sichovyk (senior private) and Sichovyk (private). Uniforms were adopted in February 1939 and consisted of a four button tunic with open collar and breeches. Insignia were not standardized. The Sich used Czech arms.

In September 1939, 600 veterans of the Sich were authorized by Nazi German intelligence (the Abwehr) to form a battalion-sized combat unit that participated in the German invasion of Poland. It was disbanded soon afterwards.

== 2019 official veteran status ==
In late March 2019, former Carpathian Sich soldiers (and other living former members of Ukrainian nationalist armed militia groups that were active during World War II and the first decade after the war) were officially granted the status of veterans. This meant that for the first time they could receive veteran benefits, including free public transport, subsidized medical services, annual monetary aid, and public utilities discounts, and will enjoy the same social benefits as former Ukrainian soldiers Red Army of the Soviet Union.

There had been several previous attempts to provide former Ukrainian nationalist fighters with official veteran status, especially during the 2005-2009 administration President Viktor Yushenko, but all failed.
