= Mykhailo Kolodzinsky =

Ukrainian nationalist and military leader (1902–1939)

- Михайло Колодзінський
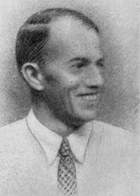
- Born: July 6, 1902; Potoczyska, Austria-Hungary
- Died: March 19, 1939 (aged 36); Solotvyno, Kingdom of Hungary
- Military career
- Allegiance: Carpathian Ukraine
- Service years: 1938–1939
- Commands: Chief of Staff of the Armed Forces of Carpathian Ukraine
- Conflicts: Hungarian invasion of Carpatho-Ukraine

Mykhailo Kolodzinsky (Ukrainian: Михайло Колодзінський; 6 July 1902 – 19 March 1939), also known by the pseudonyms Huzar and Kum, was a Ukrainian nationalist activist and military leader who commanded the Carpathian Sich in 1939.

== Biography ==
Kolodzinsky was born in the village of Potoczyska, Horodenka county, in the of Austria-Hungary. He graduated from a gymnasium in Kolomyia and later studied law at Jan Kazimierz University in Lviv. He also completed a Polish officer cadet school.

In 1922, he joined the Ukrainian Military Organization (UVO), where he worked in its military section, preparing operational plans and conducting military training. He later became a member of the Organization of Ukrainian Nationalists (OUN).

At that time, he published a pamphlet on the Polish January Uprising, arguing that in order to achieve freedom one must use all possible means. He wrote: "We need blood, let us give a sea of blood; we need terror, let us make it infernal; we need to sacrifice material goods, let us keep nothing for ourselves," and also: "There is no ethics in struggle. Ethics is the remnants of slavery imposed by the victors on the defeated."

On 17 January 1932, he was arrested on charges of treason and sentenced by a court to one year in prison for delivering a lecture at the Academic House calling for the outbreak of an anti-Polish uprising.

After his release, his organization considered him compromised in Poland, and he left for Italy via the Free City of Danzig. In Italy, he provided military training to Croatian Ustaše militants and OUN members, who were supported by the regime of Benito Mussolini. There he became acquainted with Ante Pavelić. Following the Ustaše assassination of Alexander I of Yugoslavia in Marseille, in which Louis Barthou was also killed, Italians fascist regime was forced to cu all ties with them. They were interned by the Italian by the Italian authorities in the Aeolian Islands.

After some time, members of the OUN were transferred to Filicudi and Tortorici in Sicily, where K. was also sent. During his internment, Kolodzinsky wrote his most important works: the essay Ukrainian Nationalist Military Doctrine, which he later expanded into a full monograph titled Ukrainian War Doctrine.

In autumn 1938, under the pseudonym Colonel Huzar, he travelled to Carpathian Ruthenia. On 15 March 1939 he was appointed Chief of Staff of the Armed Forces of Carpathian Ukraine. Following the German occupation of the Czech lands and Slovak declaration of independence, Hungarian forces invaded Carpathian Ukraine. After several days of fighting, Kolodzinsky was captured and executed by firing squad on 19 March 1939 in Solotvyno.

== Ukrainian War Doctrine ==
During his internment, he worked on military-theoretical writings, including Ukrainian Nationalist Military Doctrine and the expanded monograph Ukrainian War Doctrine (1938). In these works, he outlined a strategy for a future Ukrainian nationalist uprising directed against Poles, Jews, and Russians. He envisioned the creation of a vast Ukrainian Empire encompassing Moldova, Romania, Poland, Belarus, Russia, the North Caucasus, and the oil-rich Baku region. The peoples of Central Asia were to fall under Ukrainian influence, with the exception of the Kazakhs, who, in his words, were "to perish or be reduced to the role that Indians play in America."

The first step toward achieving this goal was to be a "nationalist uprising", which, in Kolodzinsky's vision, had to be "merciless, cruel, and zoological". The uprising was to break out simultaneously in both parts of Ukraine, directed against Poland and the USSR at the same time and in multiple locations. He described this strategy as the concept of “building a state from the first village,” which assumed the creation of a series of small republics that would gradually expand their territory and then merge. The imbalance of forces was to be compensated by the high determination and ruthlessness of the Ukrainian masses. It was also assumed that from the very first day of the operation, enemy civilian populations would be among the targets of attack.

The uprising's primary objective was the removal of hostile foreign elements from territories that Kolodzinsky regarded as Ukrainian, above all the Polish population. He wrote: Only during the insurrection will it be possible to sweep away literally to the last man the Polish element from the Western Ukrainian Lands and thus to end Polish pretensions with regard to the Polish character of these lands. The Polish element that actively resists must fall in battle, and the rest must be terrorized and forced to flee beyond the Vistula.

In his view, Jews also posed a mortal threat to the Ukrainian state. He wrote: Without doubt, the anger of the Ukrainian people towards the Jews will be especially terrible. We have no need to restrain this anger, but on the contrary – increase it. The more Jews who die during the insurrection the better it will be for the Ukrainian state, because Jews will be the single minority which we do not dare include in our denationalization policy. All other minorities who come out alive from the insurrection we will denationalize. Kolodzinsky nevertheless regarded himself as relatively moderate, since, unlike some other nationalists, he did not advocate the extermination of all Jews living in Ukraine. Instead, he envisaged that those who survived the uprising would be expelled or otherwise removed from Ukrainian society.

Kolodzinsky's military doctrine was adopted by the leaders of the OUN as a basis for an anti-Polish uprising coordinated with the German attack on Poland. A part of the treatise was published in Kraków in 1940. After the war, it was issued in Toronto in 1957 (by UPA veterans) and in Kyiv in 1999 (by the Youth Congress of Ukrainian Nationalists). A significant portion of the work was not published publicly, as it had a classified character and was intended exclusively for members of nationalist organizations.

== Legacy ==
The practical implementation of the concepts developed by Kolodzinsky were the massacres of the Polish population carried out by the UPA in Volhynia and Eastern Galicia in 1943–1945. A unit of the Ukrainian Insurgent Army (UPA) operating in Volhynia, part of the Northern Group, was named after Kolodzinsky. A number of streets in Ukraine are named after Kolodzinsky.

== Bibliography ==
- Himka, John-Paul (2021). Ukrainian Nationalists and the Holocaust: OUN and UPA's Participation in the Destruction of Ukrainian Jewry, 1941–1944. Stuttgart: ibidem Press. ISBN 978-3-8382-1548-8.
- Markiewicz, Paweł (2018). The Ukrainian Central Committee, 1940-1945: A Case of Collaboration in Nazi-Occupied Poland (PDF). Kraków: Jagiellonian University.
- Motyka, Grzegorz (2016). Wołyń '43: ludobójcza czystka. Fakty, analogie, polityka historyczna [Volhynia ’43: Genocidal Ethnic Cleansing. Facts, Analogies, and Historical Policy] (in Polish). Kraków: Wydawnictwo Literackie. ISBN 978-83-08-06207-4.
- Rossoliński-Liebe, Grzegorz (2014). Stepan Bandera: The Life and Afterlife of a Ukrainian Nationalist. Fascism, Genocide, and Cult. Stuttgart: ibidem Press. ISBN 978-3-8382-0684-4.
