= Ministry of Foreign Affairs (Czechoslovakia) =

Czechoslovak government ministry responsible for foreign affairs

- Czech: Ministerstvo zahraničních věcí Slovak: Ministerstvo zahraničných vecí

Ministry overview
- Formed: 14 November 1918; 107 years ago
- Dissolved: 31 December 1992; 33 years ago
- Jurisdiction: Czechoslovakia
- Headquarters: Prague, Czechoslovakia
- Ministers responsible: Edvard Beneš, first Minister of Foreign Affairs; Jozef Moravčík, last Minister of Foreign Affairs

The Ministry of Foreign Affairs of Czechoslovakia refers to the foreign affairs ministry which was responsible for representing internationally Czechoslovakia during its existence, from 1918 to 1992.

== List of ministers ==
=== First Czechoslovak Republic (1918–1938) ===
No.	Portrait	Minister	Took office	Left office	Time in office	Party
1	Edvard Beneš	Edvard Beneš (1884–1948)	14 November 1918	18 December 1935	17 years, 34 days	ČSNS
2	Milan Hodža	Milan Hodža (1878–1944)	18 December 1935	29 February 1936	73 days	RSZML
3	Kamil Krofta	Kamil Krofta (1876–1945)	29 February 1936	4 October 1938	2 years, 218 days	ČsND

=== Second Czechoslovak Republic (1938–1939) ===
No.	Portrait	Minister	Took office	Left office	Time in office	Party
1	František Chvalkovský	František Chvalkovský (1885–1945)	4 October 1938	15 March 1939	162 days	RSZML

=== Czechoslovak government-in-exile (1940–1945) ===
No.	Portrait	Minister	Took office	Left office	Time in office	Party
1	Jan Masaryk	Jan Masaryk (1886–1948)	21 July 1940	5 April 1945	4 years, 258 days	Independent

=== Third Czechoslovak Republic (1945–1948) ===
No.	Portrait	Minister	Took office	Left office	Time in office	Party
1	Jan Masaryk	Jan Masaryk (1886–1948)	5 April 1945	10 March 1948	2 years, 340 days	Independent

=== Czechoslovak Socialist Republic (1948–1989) ===
No.	Portrait	Minister	Took office	Left office	Time in office	Party
1	Vladimír Clementis	Vladimír Clementis (1902–1952)	18 March 1948	14 March 1950	1 year, 361 days	KSČ
2	Viliam Široký	Viliam Široký (1902–1971)	14 March 1950	31 December 1952	2 years, 292 days	KSČ
3	Václav David	Václav David (1910–1996)	31 March 1953	8 April 1968	15 years, 8 days	KSČ
4	Jiří Hájek	Jiří Hájek (1913–1993)	8 April 1968	19 September 1968	164 days	KSČ
–	Oldřich Černík	Oldřich Černík (1921–1994); Acting	19 September 1968	31 December 1968	103 days	KSČ
5	Ján Marko [cs]	Ján Marko (1920–?)	2 January 1969	9 December 1971	2 years, 341 days	KSČ
6	Bohuslav Chňoupek	Bohuslav Chňoupek (1925–2004)	9 December 1971	11 October 1988	16 years, 307 days	KSČ
7	Jaromír Johanes [cs]	Jaromír Johanes (born 1933)	12 October 1988	10 December 1989	1 year, 59 days	KSČ

=== Czech and Slovak Federative Republic (1989–1992) ===
No.	Portrait	Minister	Took office	Left office	Time in office	Party
1	Jiří Dienstbier	Jiří Dienstbier (1937–2011)	10 December 1989	27 June 1992	2 years, 200 days	OF
2	Jozef Moravčík	Jozef Moravčík (born 1945)	2 July 1992	31 December 1992	182 days	HZDS

== See also ==
- Ministry of Foreign Affairs (Czech Republic)
  - Minister of Foreign Affairs (Czech Republic)
- Ministry of Foreign Affairs (Slovakia)
  - Minister of Foreign Affairs (Slovakia)
