= Ladislav Deák =

Slovak historian

Ladislav Deák (13 January 1931 – 15 November 2011) was a prominent Slovak historian.

He was born in Markovce on 13 January 1931. He graduated from Faculty of Philosophy of Comenius University in Bratislava in 1957, then he has worked as a teacher. In 1962 he became a research scientist at the Institute of History of Socialistic Countries of Slovak Academy of Sciences. In the first part of his career (until half of 80's), he was focused on research of foreign policy issues of Central European states and Yugoslavia in the interwar period (1918-1939). Later, he researched relationships between Czechoslovakia and Hungary with focus on Hungarian policy towards Slovakia. He held various functions in scientific organisations, including positions in bilateral international commissions of historians. He did extensive consultation and expert work for public authorities and civil society organizations. He was an author or coauthor of 15 books, more than 100 studies and numerous scientific articles in Slovakia and abroad. He compiled edition of three volumes of documents about the First Vienna Award and its consequences. He obtained several awards for his scientific and popularization work.

He died on 15 November 2011 in Bratislava. President of Slovak republic awarded him in memoriam with Ľudovít Štúr Order - class I. for a special merit and a lifetime contribution to the development of culture, particularly in the field of historical sciences.

== Main works ==
- 1973 Európa na prelome
- 1986 Zápas o Strednú Európu 1933-1938
- 1990 Slovensko v politike Maďarska
- 1991 Hra o Slovensko
- 1996 Trianon: Illusions and Reality
- 1996 Hungary´s game for Slovakia
- 1997 The Slovaks in Hungarian Politics in the Years 1918-1939
- 1998 Viedenská arbitráž
- 2001-2005 Viedenská arbitráž – Dokumenty I. – III.

== Awards ==
- 1992 Premium for work Hra o Slovensko (SLF)
- 1996 Price of Björnstjern Björnson Center
- 1996 Honor of Matej Bel for historical studies about Slovak-Hungarian relationships (Ministry of Culture of Slovak republic)
- 1996 Honorary plaque of Ľudovít Štúr for merits in social sciences (Slovak Academy of Sciences)
- 2001 Commemorative medal for contribution in the field of research of Slovak history (Matica Slovenská)
- 2001 Price of Daniel Rapant for lifetime work in the field of historical sciences (Matica Slovenská)
- 2001 Golden pen of Association 2001 (Association of Slovaks in Switzerland)
- 2004 Price of Slovak Academy of Sciences for science popularization work
- 2012 Ľudovít Štúr Order - class I. for a special merit and a lifetime contribution to the development of culture, particularly in the field of historical sciences (in memoriam)

and others.

== Sources ==
- "Zomrel historik Ladislav Deák" (in Slovak). The Nation´s Memory Institute.
- "Curriculum Vitae of Ladislav Deák" (in Slovak). Civil Association Osobnosti.sk.
- "Prezident ocenil prácu 14 slovenských osobnost" (in Slovak). SME.
