= Kálmán Kánya =

Hungarian politician

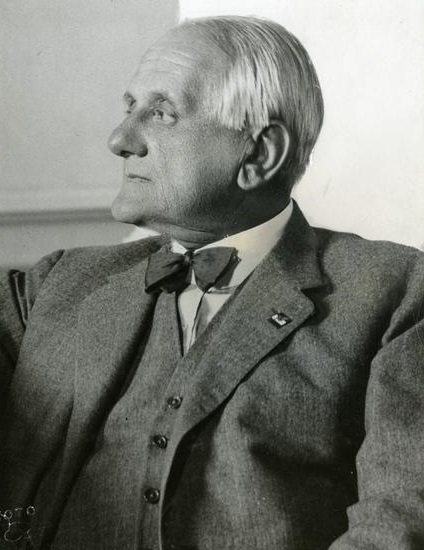
- Kálmán Kánya

Minister of Foreign Affairs of Hungary
- In office 4 February 1933 – 28 November 1938
- Prime Minister: Gyula Gömbös; Kálmán Darányi; Béla Imrédy
- Preceded by: Gyula Gömbös
- Succeeded by: Béla Imrédy

Personal details
- Born: 7 November 1869 Sopron, Austria-Hungary
- Died: 28 February 1945 (aged 75) Budapest, Kingdom of Hungary
- Party: Party of National Unity
- Profession: politician

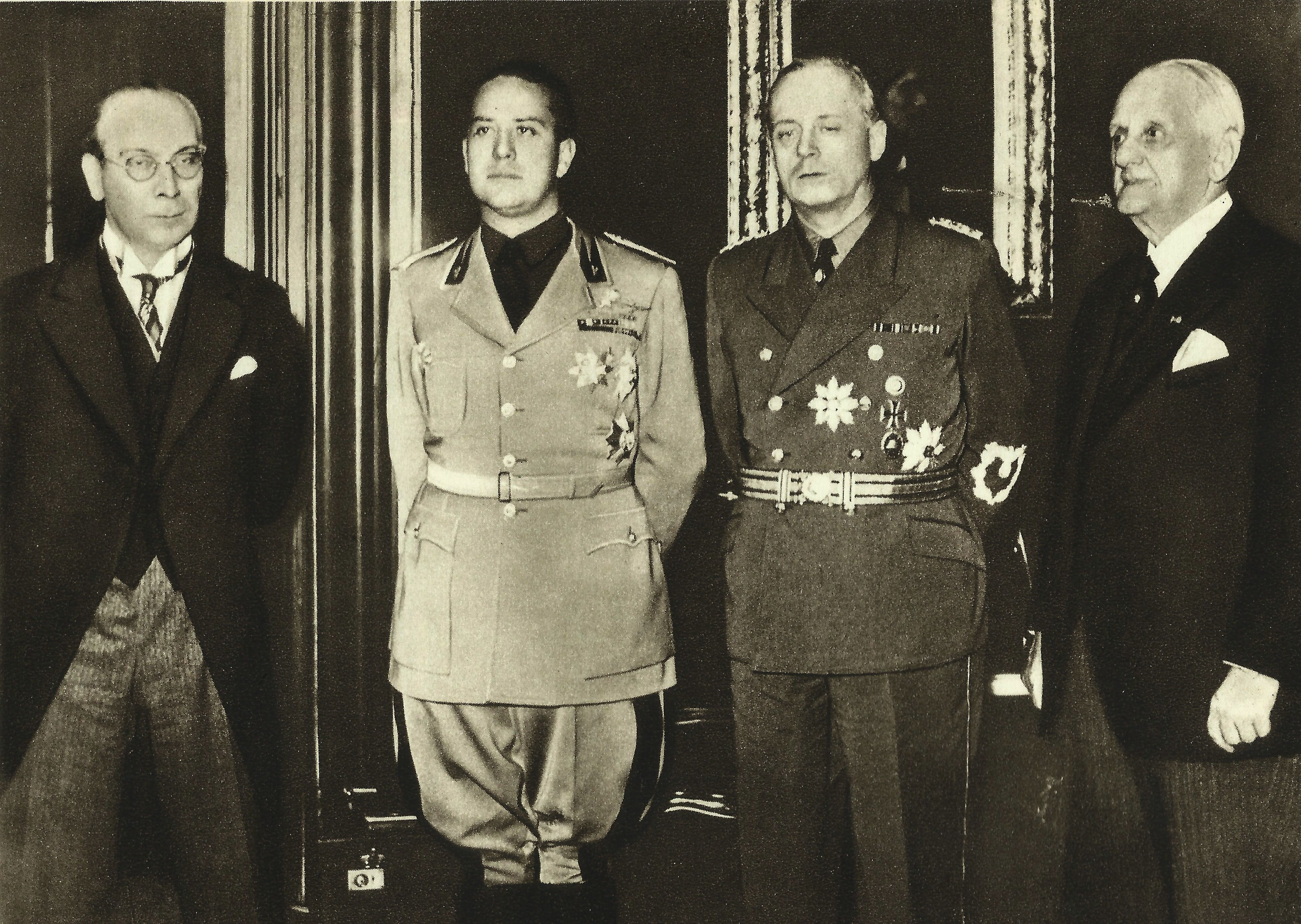
First Vienna Award: František Chvalkovský, Galeazzo Ciano, Joachim von Ribbentrop, Kálmán Kánya

Kálmán de Kánya (7 November 1869 – 28 February 1945) was the Foreign Minister of Hungary during the Horthy era.

Kánya commenced his diplomatic career in Constantinople. In 1913 he was appointed as Austro-Hungarian ambassador to Mexico and later to Berlin. From 1933 he served as Minister of Foreign Affairs.

During Kánya's tenure Hungary joined the Tripartite Pact, becoming an ally of Nazi Germany. He attempted to counterbalance Germany's hegemony with increased cooperation with Italy and kept good connections with the Little Entente.

Kánya travelled with Hungarian Prime Minister Béla Imrédy to Berchtesgaden to advocate on behalf of Hungarian territorial claims. Kánya was leader of the Hungarian-Czechoslovak delegation on the negotiations in Komárom.

On 21 November 1938 Kánya was forced to resign following the failure of the German-Italian démarche Carpathian Ukraine invasion. During the end of the Second World War he supported István Bethlen and Miklós Kállay.

Political offices
Preceded by Gyula Gömbös	Minister of Foreign Affairs; 1933–1938	Succeeded by Béla Imrédy
