= Bohuslav Chňoupek =

Czechoslovak politician, journalist and writer

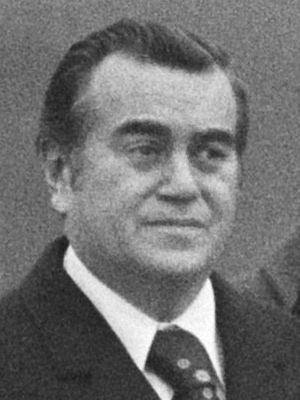
Bohuslav Chňoupek (1975)

Bohuslav Chňoupek (10 August 1925 – 28 May 2004) was a Czechoslovak politician, journalist and writer. He was one of the most visible representatives of the Communist regime after the defeat of the Prague Spring (Normalization period, i.e. 1969–1988).

== Biography ==
Chňoupek was born in Petržalka (now part of Bratislava). In 1945, Chňoupek became a member of the Communist Party of Czechoslovakia. Since 1948 he worked as journalist. After defeat of the Prague Spring, he became a member of the Central Committee of the Communist Party and obtained important government positions: 1969–70 directory of the state radio, 1970–71 ambassador in the Soviet Union, 1971–1988 minister of foreign affairs. Chňoupek always supported politics of the Soviet Union, including the perestroika campaign in late 1980s. After the fall of socialism in Czechoslovakia in 1989, he was investigated by police for misuse of powers and spent half a year in prison.

As a writer, he published several reportage novels and collections of short articles. He covered the Slovak National Uprising, wrote about how the rule of the Communist Party in Slovakia had been established, about the flight of Yuri Gagarin, and he also wrote an essay about Andy Warhol. While his books always supported ideals of socialism he described the chaos, incompetence and brutality that occurred in Slovakia when these ideals were put in practice.

He died in Prague in 2004, at the age of 78.

Government offices
Preceded by Ján Marko	Minister of Foreign Affairs of Czechoslovakia; 1971–1988	Succeeded by Jaromír Johanes
