= Studeny, Russia =

Studeny/Studyony (Russian: Студёный; masculine), Studenaya/Studyonaya (Студёная; feminine), or Studenoye/Studyonoye (Студёное; neuter) is the name for several rural localities in Russia:

- Studeny, Belgorod Oblast, a khutor in Prokhorovsky District of Belgorod Oblast
- Studeny, Krasnoyarsk Krai, a settlement under the administrative jurisdiction of the work settlement of Kuragino in Kuraginsky District of Krasnoyarsk Krai
- Studeny, Oryol Oblast, a settlement in Vyshneolshansky Selsoviet of Dolzhansky District of Oryol Oblast
- Studeny, Samara Oblast, a settlement in Krasnoyarsky District of Samara Oblast
- Studeny, Saratov Oblast, a settlement in Petrovsky District of Saratov Oblast
- Studeny, Sverdlovsk Oblast, a settlement under the administrative jurisdiction of the city of Nizhny Tagil, Sverdlovsk Oblast
- Studeny, Tula Oblast, a settlement in Alexandrovsky Rural Okrug of Zaoksky District of Tula Oblast
- Studeny, Voronezh Oblast, a settlement in Kolenovskoye Rural Settlement of Novokhopyorsky District of Voronezh Oblast
- Studenoye, Kaluga Oblast, a village in Baryatinsky District of Kaluga Oblast
- Studenoye, Leningrad Oblast, a logging depot settlement in Melnikovskoye Settlement Municipal Formation of Priozersky District of Leningrad Oblast
- Studenoye, Novosibirsk Oblast, a selo in Karasuksky District of Novosibirsk Oblast
- Studenoye, Orenburg Oblast, a selo in Studenovsky Selsoviet of Ileksky District of Orenburg Oblast
- Studenoye, Oryol Oblast, a selo in Vyshneolshansky Selsoviet of Dolzhansky District of Oryol Oblast
- Studenoye, Vologda Oblast, a village in Strelensky Selsoviet of Velikoustyugsky District of Vologda Oblast
- Studenoye, Voronezh Oblast, a selo in Nashchekinskoye Rural Settlement of Anninsky District of Voronezh Oblast
