= František Chvalkovský =

Czechoslovak politician

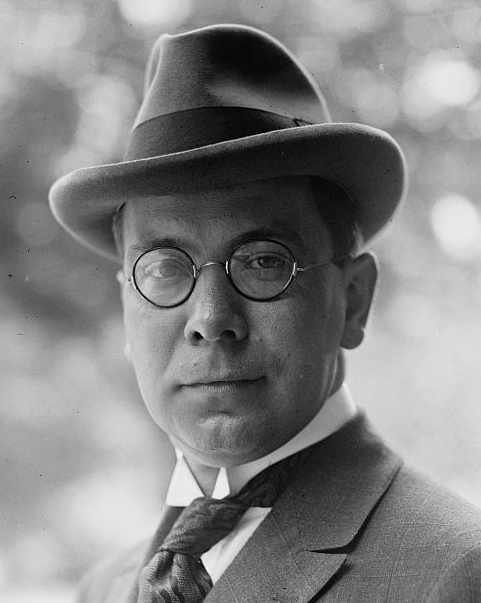
František Chvalkovský

František Chvalkovský (30 July 1885, Jílové u Prahy – 25 February 1945) was a Czech diplomat and the fourth foreign minister of Czechoslovakia.

== Activities during the First Republic ==
In the newly-independent Czechoslovakia, Chvalkovský first became a secretary of Interior Minister Antonín Švehla. In 1920, he joined the diplomatic service and participated in the negotiations of the Treaty of Trianon. He later served as ambassador to Japan, the United States, Germany and Italy.

== After Munich Agreement ==
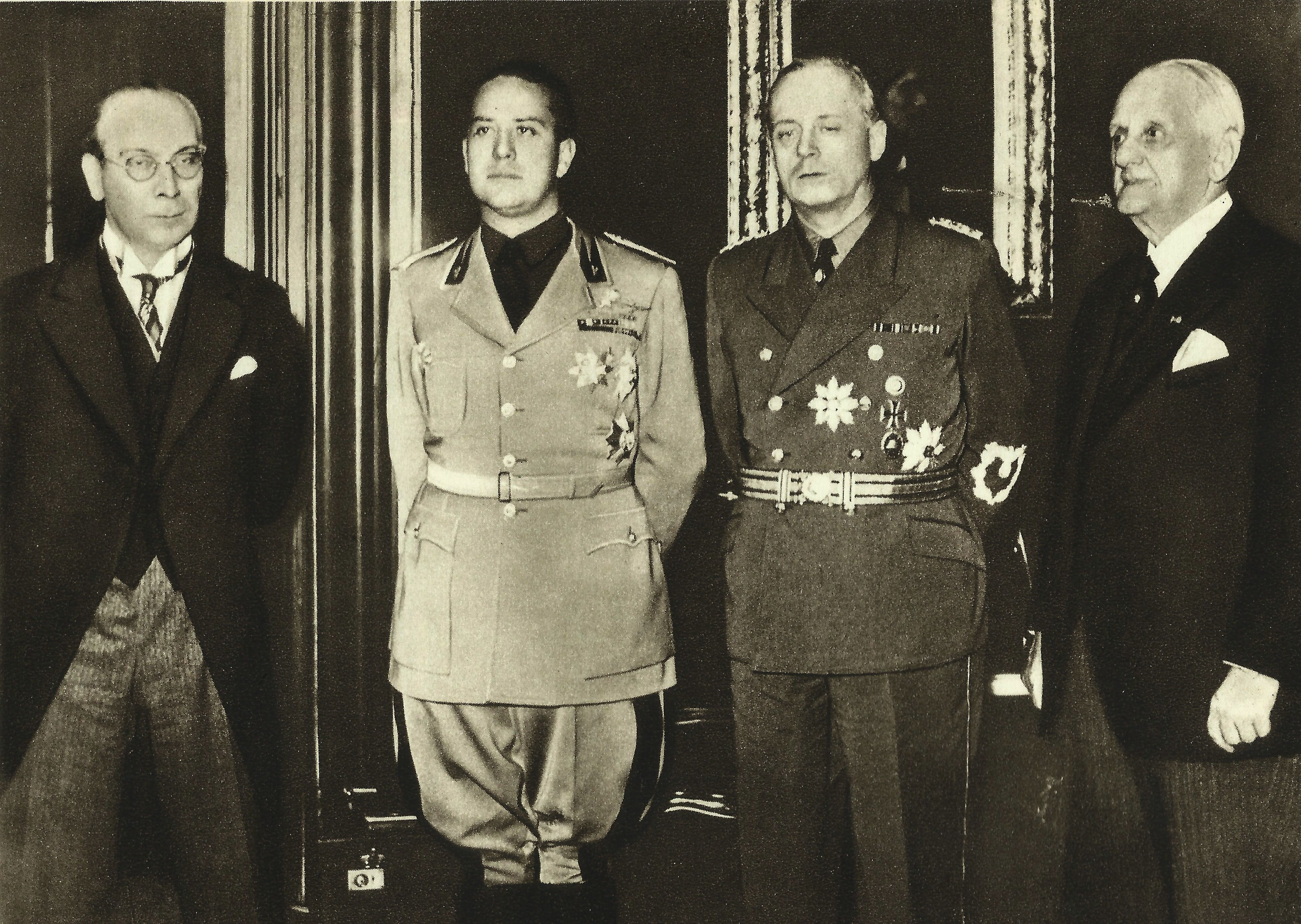
First Vienna Award: František Chvalkovský, Galeazzo Ciano, Joachim von Ribbentrop, Kálmán Kánya

The Munich Agreement ended the First Republic of Czechoslovakia. Its previous pro-democratic and anti-totalitarian policies gave way to calls for authoritarian government and closer cooperation with Nazi Germany (more information:Second Czechoslovak Republic). The political elite, connected with former Czechoslovak President Edvard Beneš, had to leave office and Chvalkovský became foreign minister. He tried to maintain the independence of the rump state by making concessions to neighbours in the hope of gaining time for a more favorable outcome in the future. He grossly underestimated Hitler's desire to occupy Central Europe and the hunger for revenge from Poland and Hungary, who had been forced to make painful territorial concessions to Czechoslovakia after World War I. He represented Czechoslovakia during the Vienna Arbitration. Insufficient preparation forced Czechoslovakia to concede significant parts of Slovakia to Hungary. When Slovakia declared independence on 14 March 1939, Chvalkovský travelled with Czechoslovak President Emil Hácha to Berlin in the hope that further concessions would preserve the independence of Czech lands.

== Under Nazi rule ==
With the establishment of the Protectorate, there was no official place for the Czech diplomatic service. In its last ruling, under German pressure, the Foreign Ministry ordered all Czechoslovak ambassadors to close their embassies and to transfer them to the Germans. Patriotic clerks hoped that the ambassadors, free from direct Nazi pressure, would disobey the order and keep the embassies for the future benefit of the government-in-exile. As a last resort, if the host government was hostile to them, they should transfer their embassy to the it, rather than Germany.

However, many ambassadors did not read between the lines and obeyed the order literally, as they were used to doing, which caused significant damage to Czechoslovak interests. Given the sequence of events shaped by Chvalkovský, many countries, such as France, a signatory of the Munich Agreement, initially considered the fall of Czechoslovakia to be a result of internal forces, rather than German aggression. Chvalkovský thus caused considerable damage to Czechoslovakia during that critical period.

After the Foreign Ministry was closed in 1939, Chvalkovský became an envoy of the Protectorate in Germany. He was killed on a highway outside Berlin during an Allied Air raid, strafed by a low-flying aircraft. The German High Command reported British strafing attacks near Berlin that day.
