= Ivan S. Kerno =

Ivan S. Kerno (1891 – 17 April 1961) was a Czechoslovak lawyer and diplomat and a United Nations legal official.

== Biography ==
Ivan Kerno was born in 1891 in Myjava. He was a Slovak lawyer and diplomat serving for the inter-war Czechoslovakia. After the establishment of Czechoslovakia as an independent state following the First World War, Kerno began to work for the Czechoslovak legation in Paris. In 1928 he joined the secretariat of the League of Nations in Geneva.

He was a member of the Czechoslovak delegation at the First Vienna Award in 1938. Upon the establishment of the United Nations following the Second World War, Kerno became Assistant to Secretary-General Trygve Lie and was in charge of the Legal Department. Between 1946 and 1952 he held the post of the first legal councilor of the United Nations and the deputy of the UN Secretary General for legal matters. After February 1948 and the communist coup d'etat in Czechoslovakia, he remained in the United States.

Kerno died 17 April 1961, in Long Island, New York. His papers are archived at Stanford University. He was the father of Milan Kerno, who became vice-president for finance of the African Development Bank.

== Works ==
- "Moratórium Hoover a plán Young" (The Hoover Moratorium and the Young Plan), In: Obzor národohospodářský XXXVI. (1931) pp. 551–558
