= Milan Hodža =

Slovak politician and journalist

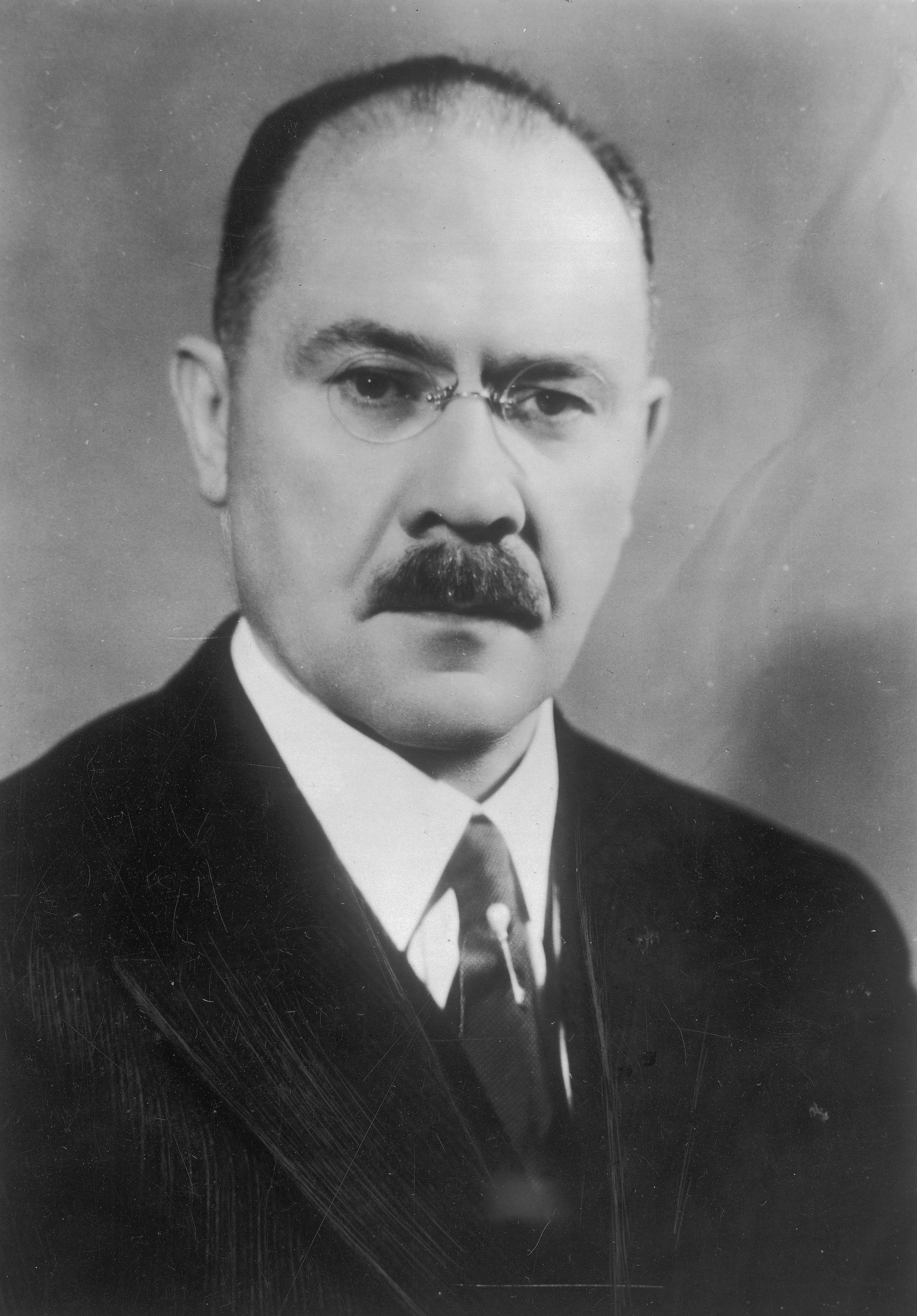

10th Prime Minister of Czechoslovakia
- In office 5 November 1935 – 22 September 1938
- Preceded by: Jan Malypetr
- Succeeded by: Jan Syrový

Acting President of Czechoslovakia
- In office 14 December 1935 – 18 December 1935
- Preceded by: Tomáš Garrigue Masaryk
- Succeeded by: Edvard Beneš

Personal details
- Born: 1 February 1878 Szucsány, Hungary (now Sučany, Slovakia)
- Died: 27 June 1944 (aged 66) Clearwater, Florida, U.S.
- Party: Slovak National Party; Agrarian Party of Czechoslovakia

Milan Hodža (1 February 1878 – 27 June 1944) was a Slovak politician and journalist, serving from 1935 to 1938 as the prime minister of Czechoslovakia. As a proponent of regional integration, he was known for his attempts to establish a democratic federation of Central European states.

== Early life ==
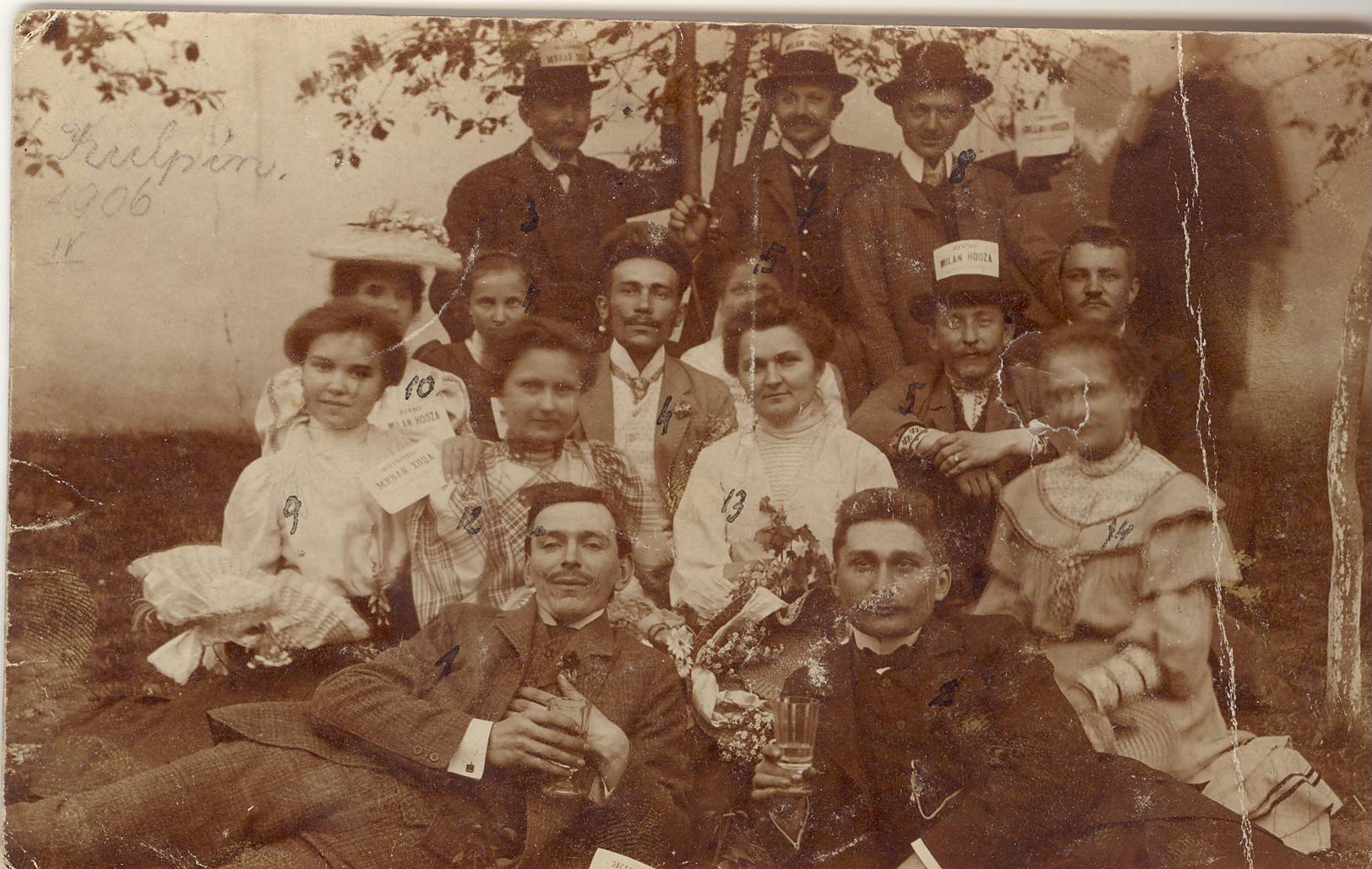
Supporters of Milan Hodža in 1906

Proposed map of federal United States of Greater Austria and the major ethnic groups of Austria-Hungary

Milan Hodža was born in the Lutheran parish of Szucsány, in the Turóc County of the Kingdom of Hungary (present-day Sučany, Slovakia). His surname (meaning master or teacher in Turkish) was given to his ancestors at the times of the Ottomans conquest and rule.

He studied at gymnasiums in Besztercebánya (today Banská Bystrica, Slovakia) from 1888 to 1890, in Sopron from 1890 to 1894 and in Nagyszeben (today Sibiu, Romania), where he passed graduation exams in 1896, before attending universities in Budapest and Vienna. He started his career as a journalist in Budapest, in 1897. He edited and founded the newspaper Slovenský denník (1900–1901) and the weekly Slovenský týždenník (1903–1914). From 1916 to 1918, he was editor of the Austrian press office in Vienna.

== Political career until 1918 ==
He was a deputy to the parliament of the Kingdom of Hungary from 1905 to 1910. As a member of the Slovak National Party, the only Slovak party in Austria-Hungary, he became the ideological leader and founder of Slovak agrarianism. He was vice-chairman of the Slovak National Party from 1906 to 1914. Since the party did not endorse his agrarian program, he planned to create his own political party, but was prevented by the outbreak of World War I.

Milan Hodža was a close aide of Archduke Franz Ferdinand, the successor to the Austrian and Hungarian thrones, after the 1910 elections. He proposed to the Archduke a detailed plan to turn the Kingdom of Hungary into a federative monarchy, including a separate Slovak state. The Archduke hoped that federalization would strengthen the ties between the oppressed non-Magyar nations and the monarchy, but his initiative was strongly opposed by the Hungarian political elite.

During World War I, Milan Hodža was involved in the preparations for the creation of Czecho-Slovakia. He was a member of the 1918–1919 Slovak National Council and was a signatory of the Declaration of the Slovak Nation, with which the Slovaks officially joined the newly created state of Czechoslovakia in 1918.

== First Czechoslovak Republic ==
After World War I, he became the leader of the Czechoslovak Agrarian Party in Slovakia and as such gained considerable influence over Czechoslovakia's policy in many spheres, influencing the process of land reform, the passing of bills on agrarian tolls, enforced syndicalization, administrative reforms, and the structure and policy of the government. Between the two world wars he was also a key representative of the Czechoslovak and international agrarian movement, as a founding member of the presidium of the International Agrarian Bureau, an institution of European agrarian parties.

From 1921, Milan Hodža was a professor of modern history at Comenius University in Bratislava. In the interwar period, he helped establish many Slovak newspapers and magazines and retained a strong political and ideological influence on them. His political papers were published in the book Články, reči, štúdie 1-6 (1930–1934; Articles, Speeches, Studies).

Hodža sat as a deputy in the Czechoslovak parliament from 1918 to 1938, serving in a number of posts. From 1918 to 1919 he was the Czechoslovak government's representative in Hungary, and also served as state secretary of the Ministry of Interior (1919), Minister for the Unification of Laws and the Organisation of Administration (1919–1920 and 1926–1929), Minister of Agriculture (1922–1926 and 1932–1935), Minister of Education (1926–1929), and Minister of Foreign Affairs (1935–1936), before eventually becoming the Prime Minister of Czechoslovakia from 1935 to 1938.

In the 1920s, he was a Czechoslovakist (considering the Czechs and Slovaks to form one nation), which enabled him to reach high posts in Prague. Nevertheless, he had frequent conflicts with Czech politicians as a result of his attempts to take into account the specific needs of Slovakia within Czechoslovakia, which was unusual at that time. Moreover, he planned the creation of a block of anti-Centrist (i.e. anti-Prague) Slovak parties. His views changed somewhat later on; in 1938 he acknowledged the full sovereignty of the Slovaks as a separate nation and in the summer of that year, before Slovakia's autonomy was proclaimed in the autumn, he included in his government programme changes to the centralist structure of Czechoslovakia, using a combination of federal, autonomist and self-administrative ideas.

In 1936–1937 he attempted to launch a project of bringing together Czechoslovakia, Austria, Romania, Hungary and Yugoslavia based on preferential duties - a step towards the unprecedented economic integration of the region. Instead, Hodža's government had to accept the Munich Agreement in 1938 and he was forced to resign under pressure.

== Exile and death ==
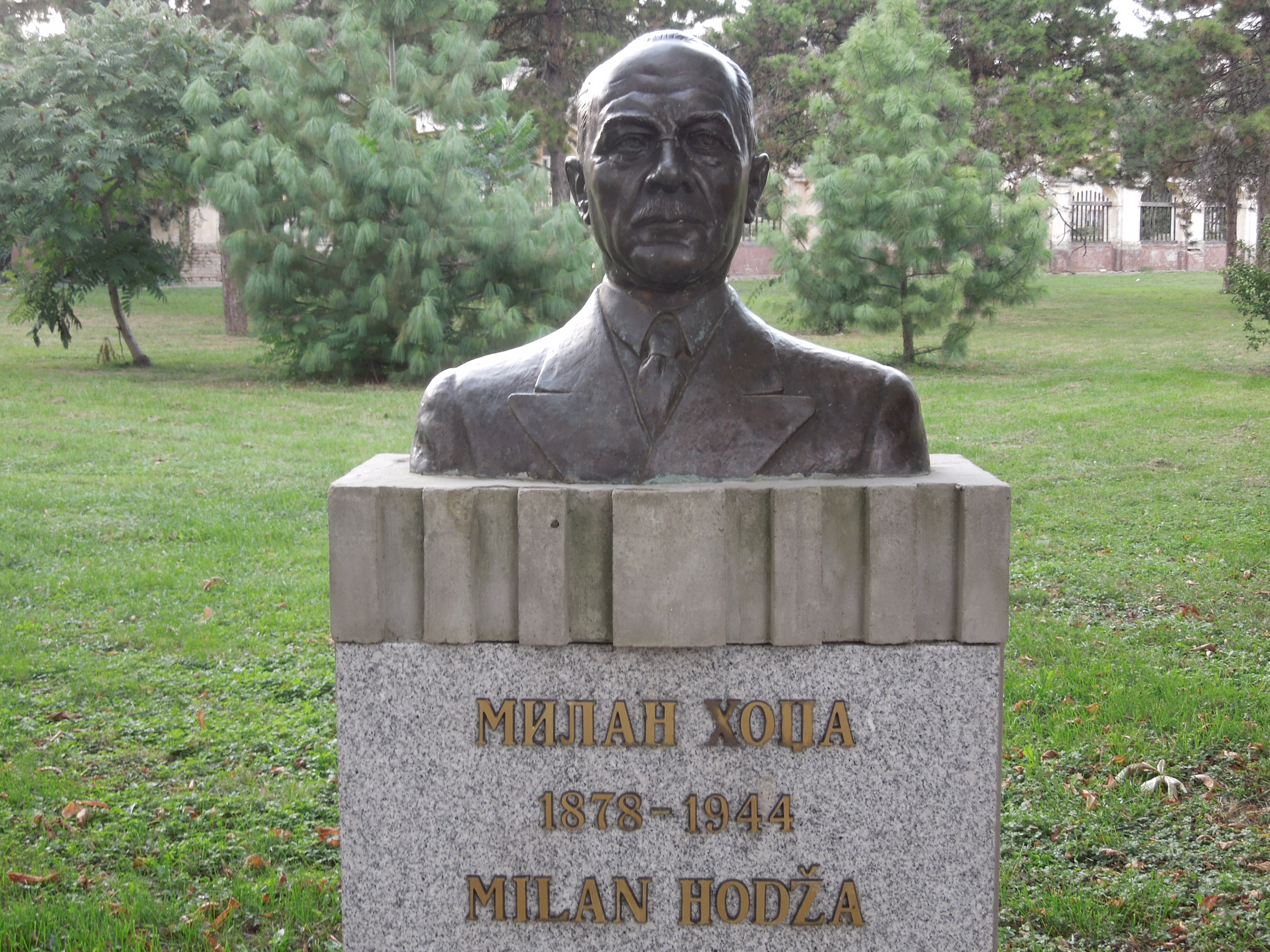
A bust of Milan Hodža in Kulpin

After the Munich Agreement in late 1938, he lived in exile in Switzerland, France (1939), Great Britain (1940) and after 1941 in the United States. During World War II, he was the co-author of a memorandum on the situation of Slovakia within Czechoslovakia (October 1939), in which he re-iterated his project of 1938. In November 1939, he established the 1939 Slovak National Council in Paris as the supreme body of Slovak resistance, serving as its chairman. The Slovak National Council merged with the Czech National Council to form the Czecho-Slovak National Council in January 1940. This organization (including its Czech members) competed with the government-in-exile led by Edvard Beneš (a strong Czechoslovakist) in London. The two exile groups were in permanent conflict. When Paris was conquered by the Germans, the British security forces took the members of the Czecho-Slovak National Council into custody, which was an accomplishment of spies working for the Beneš group. Hodža capitulated and he accepted a second-rate post in Beneš's State Council in November 1940. He did not participate in the activities of the State Council however, and left for the US in 1941, where he developed a project for a Central European Federation (published as the book Federation in Central Europe, 1942). Although his plan received attention from American intellectuals and officials at the United States Department of State, his plan did not materialize due to the beginning of the Cold War.

Hodža died in Florida, United States, on June 27 1944, at the age of sixty-six. He held awards in high Czechoslovak, French, Italian, Romanian, Yugoslavian and Polish. On 27 June 2002, his remains were reburied in the National Cemetery in Martin, in his native Slovakia.

== Family ==
His son was Fedor Hodža (a politician) and he was the nephew of politician and poet Michal Miloslav Hodža.

== Works online ==
- Československý rozkol: príspevky k dejinám slovenčiny. Turčiansky Svätý Martin: [s.n.], 1920. 424 p. – available at ULB Digital Library.

== See also ==
- First Republic of Czechoslovakia

Government offices
Preceded by Edvard Beneš	Minister of Foreign Affairs of Czechoslovakia; 1935–1936	Succeeded by Kamil Krofta
Preceded by Jan Malypetr	Prime Minister of Czechoslovakia; 1935–1938	Succeeded by Jan Syrový
