= Studený =

- Municipality
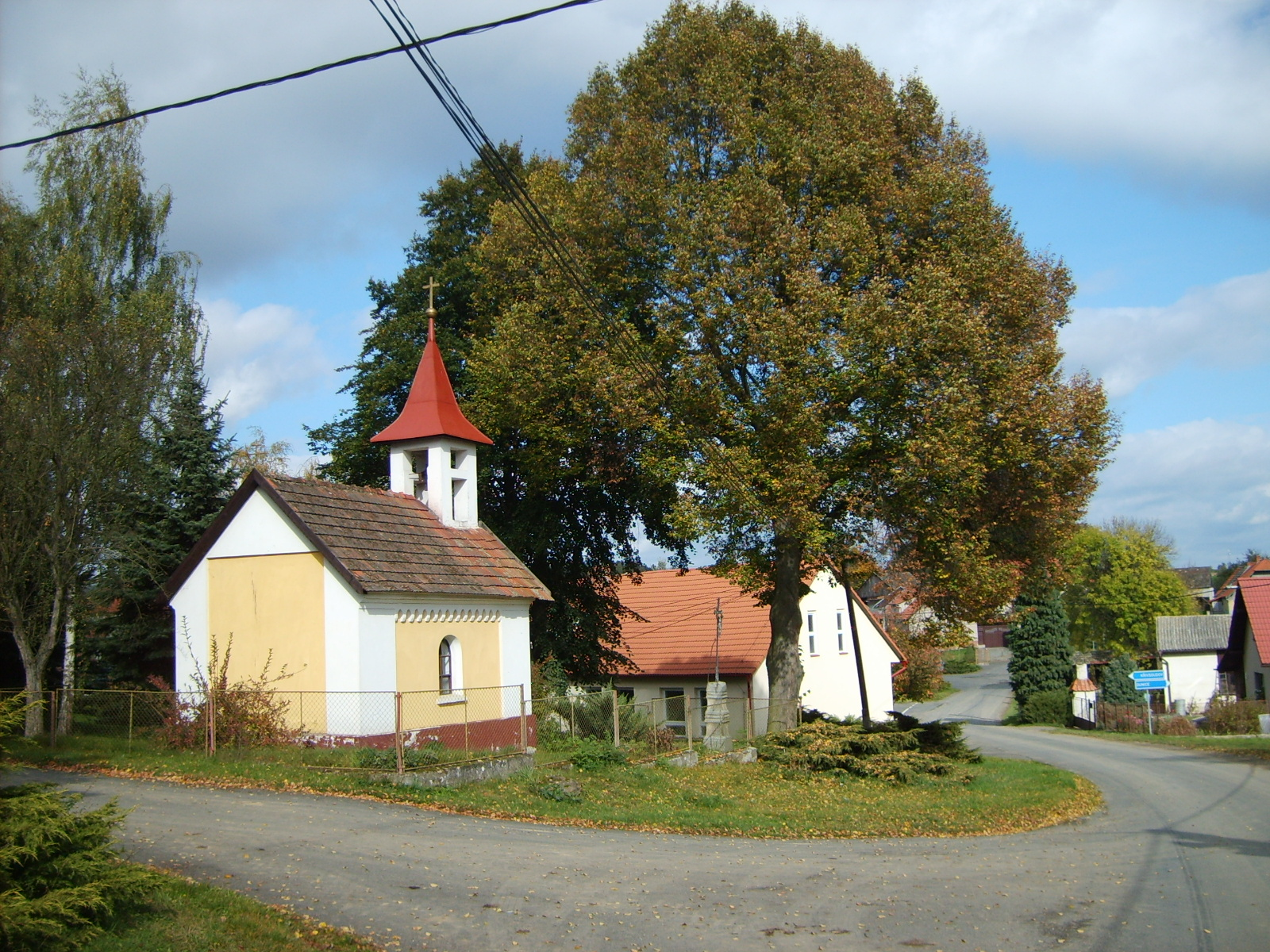
- Chapel in the centre of Studený

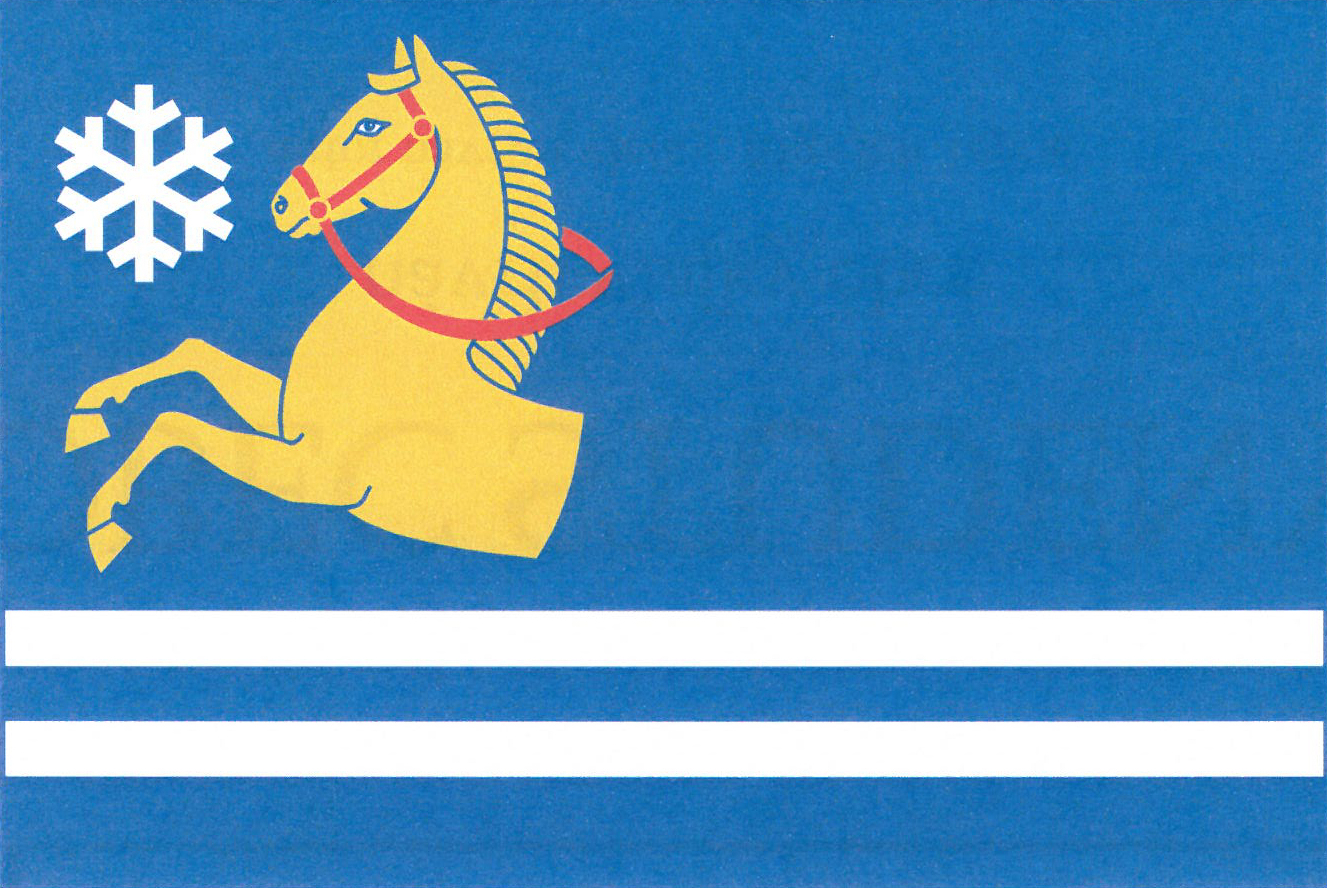
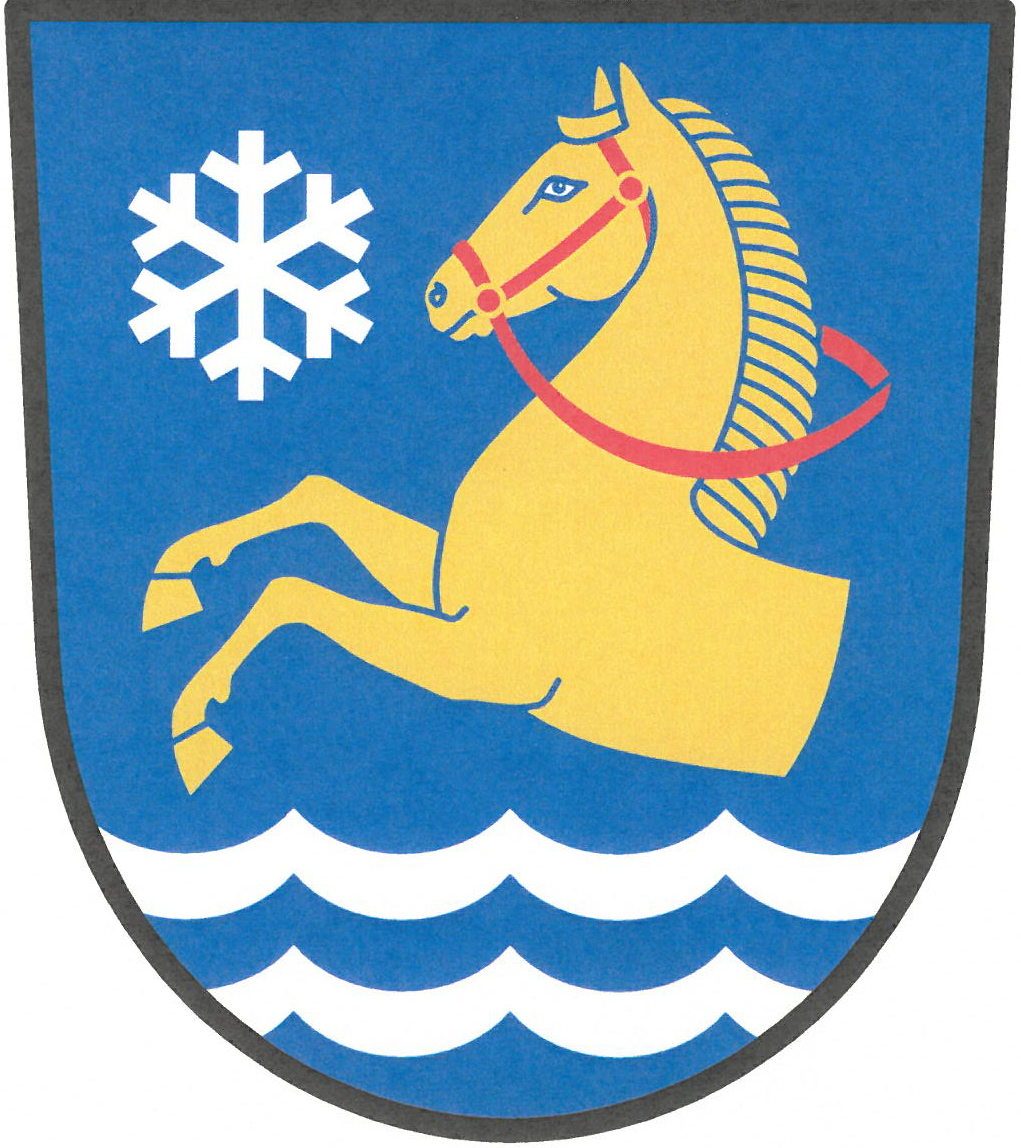
- Flag Coat of arms

- Location in the Czech Republic
- Coordinates: 49°36′27″N 15°7′40″E
- Country: Czech Republic
- Region: Central Bohemian
- District: Benešov
- First mentioned: 1354

Area
  - Total: 4.42 km^{2} (1.71 sq mi)
- Elevation: 478 m (1,568 ft)

Population (2026-01-01)
  - Total: 110
  - Density: 25/km^{2} (64/sq mi)
- Time zone: UTC+1 (CET)
  - Summer (DST): UTC+2 (CEST)
- Postal code: 257 68
- Website: www.obecstudeny.cz

Studený is a municipality and village in Benešov District in the Central Bohemian Region of the Czech Republic. It has about 100 inhabitants.

== Administrative division ==
Studený consists of two municipal parts (in brackets population according to the 2021 census):

- Studený (90)
- Petrova Lhota (13)

== Demographics ==
Historical population
Year	Pop.	±%
1869	385	—
1880	387	+0.5%
1890	380	−1.8%
1900	330	−13.2%
1910	344	+4.2%
1921	330	−4.1%
1930	288	−12.7%
1950	238	−17.4%
1961	252	+5.9%
1970	200	−20.6%
1980	148	−26.0%
1991	136	−8.1%
2001	107	−21.3%
2011	98	−8.4%
2021	103	+5.1%
Source: Censuses
