= 1946 Slovak parliamentary election =

← 1938	14 August 1946	1948 →

All 100 seats in the Slovak National Council 51 seats needed for a majority

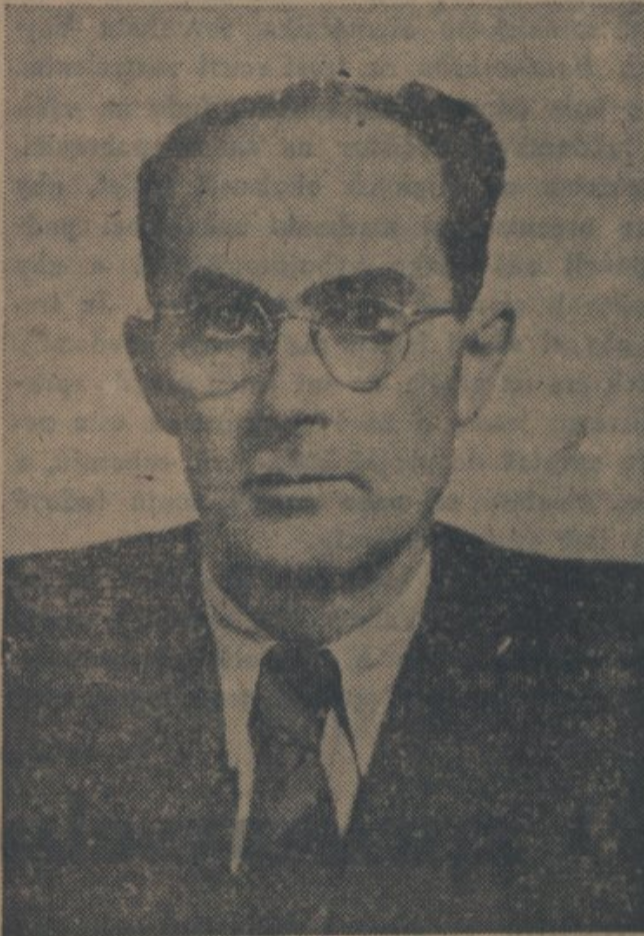

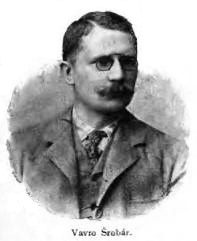
	First party	Second party
Leader	Jozef Lettrich	Karol Šmidke
Party	DS	KSS
Seats after	63	31
Popular vote	999,622	489,596
Percentage	62.50%	30.61%
	Third party	Fourth party
Leader	Vavro Šrobár	Ivan Frlička
Party	SS	SP
Seats after	3	3
Popular vote	60,195	50,079
Percentage	3.76%	3.13%
Chairman of the Slovak National Council before election
Jozef Lettrich
DS
Elected Chairman of the Slovak National Council
Jozef Lettrich
DS

Parliamentary elections were held in Slovakia on 14 August 1946, when the Slovak Commissariat of Interior assigned seats in the National Council to the political parties according to their result in the 1946 state parliament election. They were the last elections before the Communist takeover in 1948. Vast majority of 100 seats went to the conservative Democratic Party. The elections also determined the composition of the Slovak Board of Commissioners.

== Result ==
Party	Votes	%	Seats
Democratic Party	999,622	62.50	63
Communist Party of Slovakia	489,596	30.61	31
Freedom Party	60,195	3.76	3
Labour Party	50,079	3.13	3
Total	1,599,492	100.00	100
Source: Čas (seats), Statistical Handbook (votes)
