= Košice Program =

1945 agreement between Czechoslovak Communists and the Czechoslovak government-in-exile

The Košice Program, or Košice Government Program (Czech: Košický vládní program, Slovak: Košický vládny program) was a 1945 agreement between Czechoslovak Communists who had spent the war in the Soviet Union and the Czechoslovak government-in-exile, which had been based in London. They met in the city of Košice, which had already been liberated by the Red Army. The program outlined the postwar political settlement, the National Front under which all political parties would operate, and promised the expulsion of Germans from Czechoslovakia. The program was the basis of both the Third Czechoslovak Republic and, following the 1948 coup, the Czechoslovak Socialist Republic.

The program document was approved on 5 April 1945. It set out the principles of future policy and was referred to as the "program of national and democratic revolution". It shifted the orientation of Czechoslovakia further towards the USSR and "legally" anchored dependence on the USSR. It declared claims about the collective guilt of right-wing parties and the German and Hungarian populations for the breakup of Czechoslovakia and for cooperation with the Nazi regime. The draft text was prepared by the Czechoslovak Communist Party (KSČ).

== Preparation ==
In the final stages of World War II, negotiations were held between President Edvard Beneš and the Moscow leadership of the Communist Party, led by Klement Gottwald, about forming a postwar government. As a result a government of the National Front of Czechs and Slovaks was established on 4 April 1945 with the Social Democratic Party chairman Zdeněk Fierlinger as the prime minister. Officially, it was reported that the government approved the so-called Košice government program after arriving in Košice on 5 April 1945. In fact, the government program was signed on March 29 in Moscow. The parties of the London exile arrived at the Moscow meeting insufficiently prepared. Besides the Communists, only the Social Democrats submitted a proposal, which was rejected by Fierlinger (a fellow traveler of Communism who supported the coup).

== Structure ==
The program consisted of 16 chapters dealing with various issues of social, political, and economic life, and of the international status of the liberated Czechoslovakia.

The main features of the program are:

- Establishing a regime of limited multi-party democracy on the principle of national unity government, broadly declared as "people's democracy"
- Abandonment of Czechoslovakism; recognition of Slovak self governance and of the Slovak National Council as its representative; accepting the relationship of Czechs and Slovaks on an equal footing
- A new political system based on the National Front as a broad coalition for all permitted political directions, thus excluding the opposition (the most important element was banning the Agrarian Party)
- Restrictions on private ownership, nationalization of large companies, and other socialist reforms
- Denaturalization of German and Hungarian nationals living in Czechoslovakia (with legislative exceptions)
- One-sided orientation towards the Soviet Union in foreign, security and defense policy
- Formation of the Czechoslovak Army on the Red Army principles, introducing "propaganda officers".
