= 1946 Czechoslovak parliamentary election =

- 26 May 1946
- All 300 seats in the Constituent National Assembly; 151 seats needed for a majority
- Turnout: 93.86%
Party	Leader	Vote %	Seats	+/–
KSČ	Klement Gottwald	31.19	93	+63
ČSNS	Petr Zenkl	18.37	55	+27
ČSL	Jan Šrámek	15.71	46	+24
DS	Jozef Lettrich	14.14	43	New
ČSSD	Zdeněk Fierlinger	12.10	37	−1
KSS	Štefan Bašťovanský	6.92	21	New
SS	Vavro Šrobár	0.85	3	New
SP	Ivan Frlička	0.71	2	New
This lists parties that won seats. See the complete results below.
Prime Minister before	Prime Minister after
Zdeněk Fierlinger; ČSSD	Klement Gottwald; KSČ

Parliamentary elections were held in Czechoslovakia on 26 May 1946. The Communist Party of Czechoslovakia emerged as the largest party, winning 114 of the 300 seats (93 for the main party and 21 for its Slovak branch) with 38% of the vote. The Communist vote share was higher than any party had ever achieved in a Czechoslovak parliamentary election; previously, no party had ever won more than 25%. Voter turnout was 94%. The national results also determined the composition of the Slovak National Council and local committees.

This was one of only two free nationwide elections held in the Eastern Bloc, the other having been the 1945 Hungarian parliamentary election. Two years later, the Communists staged a coup d'etat and forced President Edvard Beneš to appoint a Communist-dominated government. As a result, the 1946 election was the last free and fair election held in Czechoslovakia until 1990.

== Background ==
After World War II a 300-member Interim National Assembly was formed and met for the first time on 28 October 1945. The Assembly created a new electoral system with the country divided into 28 multi-member constituencies. 150 members were elected from Bohemia, 81 from Moravia and Silesia and 69 from Slovakia. The voting age was lowered to 18, but only Czechs, Slovaks and other Slavs could register to vote.

== Opinion polls ==
Date	Polling firm	KSČ	ČSNS	ČSL	ČSSD	Blank votes	Notes
April 1946	ÚVVM	39.6	22.5	19.2	16.0	2.7	Only Bohemia and Moravia

== Results ==
Party	Votes	%	Seats	+/–
Communist Party of Czechoslovakia	2,205,697	31.19	93	+63
Czechoslovak National Social Party	1,298,980	18.37	55	+27
Czechoslovak People's Party	1,111,009	15.71	46	+24
Democratic Party	999,622	14.14	43	New
Czechoslovak Social Democracy	855,538	12.10	37	–1
Communist Party of Slovakia	489,596	6.92	21	New
Freedom Party	60,195	0.85	3	New
Labour Party	50,079	0.71	2	New
Total	7,070,716	100.00	300	0
Valid votes	7,070,716	99.17		
Invalid votes	27,250	0.38		
Blank votes	32,177	0.45		
Total votes	7,130,143	100.00		
Registered voters/turnout	7,596,947	93.86		
Source: Nohlen & Stöver

=== Bohemia ===
Party	Votes	%	Seats
Communist Party of Czechoslovakia	1,541,852	43.39	65
Czechoslovak National Social Party	898,425	25.28	38
Czechoslovak People's Party	580,004	16.32	24
Czechoslovak Social Democracy	533,029	15.00	23
Total	3,553,310	100.00	150
Blank votes	10,969	0.31	
Source: Statistical Handbook

=== Moravia and Silesia ===
Party	Votes	%	Seats
Communist Party of Czechoslovakia	663,845	34.61	28
Czechoslovak People's Party	531,005	27.69	22
Czechoslovak National Social Party	400,555	20.88	17
Czechoslovak Social Democracy	322,509	16.82	14
Total	1,917,914	100.00	81
Blank votes	8,484	0.44	
Source: Statistical Handbook

=== Slovakia ===
Party	Votes	%	Seats
Democratic Party	999,622	62.50	43
Communist Party of Slovakia	489,596	30.61	21
Freedom Party	60,195	3.76	3
Labour Party	50,079	3.13	2
Total	1,599,492	100.00	69
Blank votes	12,724	0.79	
Source: Statistical Handbook

== Aftermath ==
Following the elections, Communist leader Klement Gottwald formed a coalition government. However, the Communists gradually tightened their grip on the country. After the non-Communist members resigned from the Cabinet on 25 February 1948, the Communists seized full control of the country.

== See also ==
- 1946 Slovak parliamentary election
