= Interim National Assembly (Czechoslovakia) =

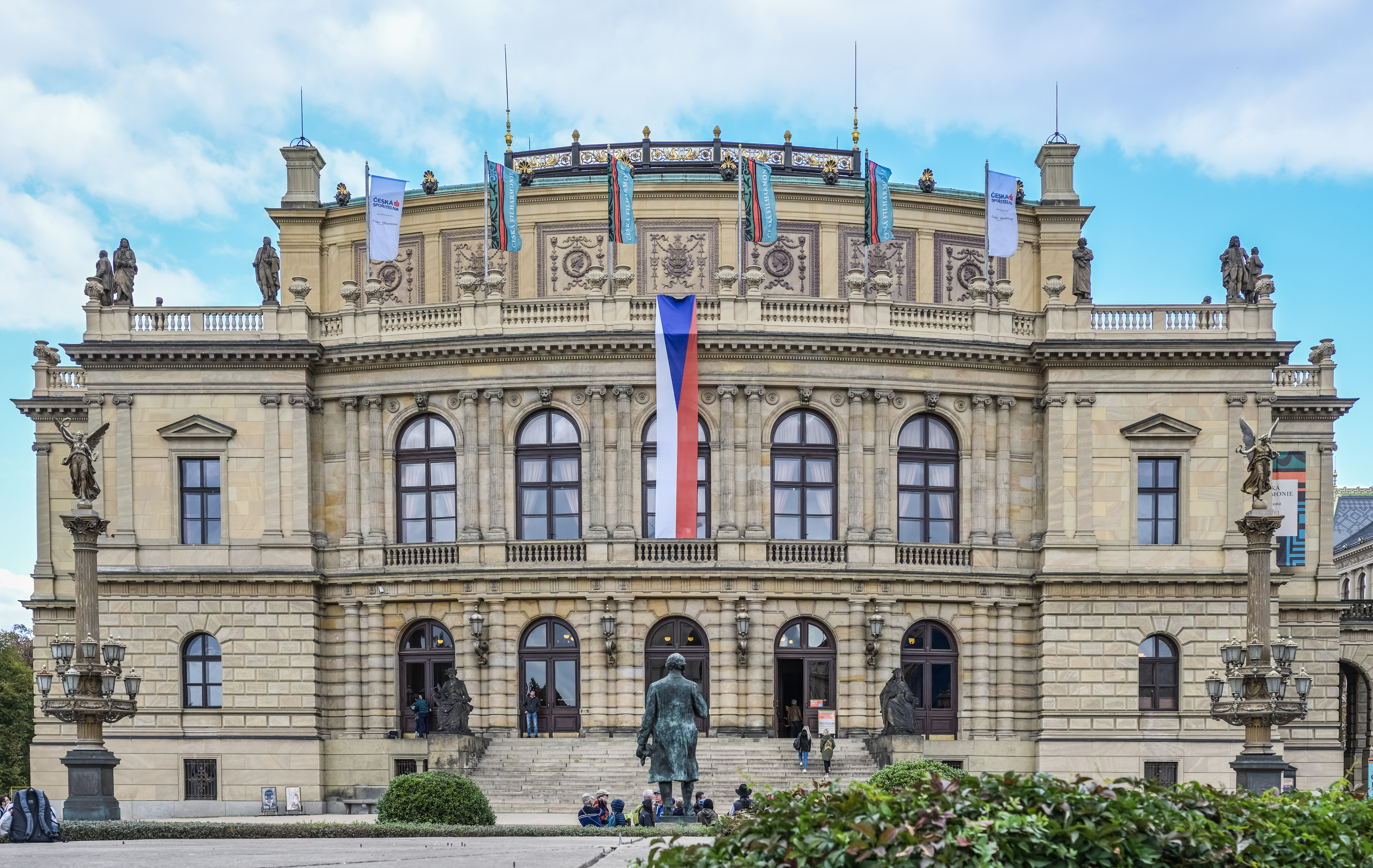
Rudolfinum in Prague, original seat of the Assembly

The Interim National Assembly (Czech: Prozatímní Národní shromáždění) was the legislative body of the Third Czechoslovak Republic from 28 October 1945 to June 1946. All 300 members of the assembly were from the National Front.

It was succeeded by the Constituent National Assembly, which sat for another two years before the democratic government was overthrown in the 1948 Czechoslovak coup d'état.
