= Constituent National Assembly (Czechoslovakia) =

Czechoslovak Parliament in 1946–1948

Constituent National Assembly of the Czechoslovak Republic Ústavodárné národní shromáždění republiky Československé (Czech) Ústavodarné národné zhromaždenie republiky Československej (Slovak)
- Legislative body in Czechoslovakia

Type
- Type: Constituent assembly

History
- Established: 18 June 1946
- Disbanded: 30 May 1948
- Preceded by: Interim National Assembly
- Succeeded by: National Assembly

Structure
- Seats: 300 members
- Political groups: KSČ (93); ČSNS (55); ČSL (46); DS (43); ČSSD (37); KSS (21); SS (3); SP (2)

Elections
- Voting system: Direct competitive proportional representation
- Last election: 26 May 1946

Meeting place
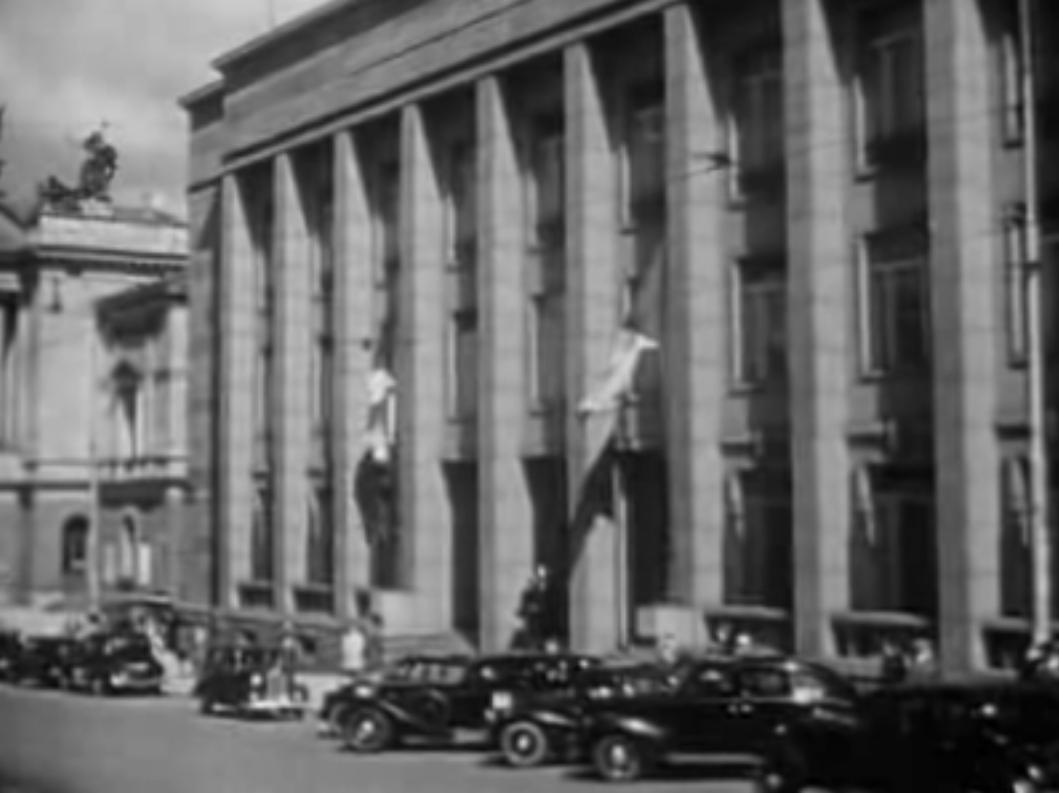
- Constituent National Assembly (originally stock exchange building), Prague

The Constituent National Assembly (Czech: Ústavodárné národní shromáždění, Slovak: Ústavodarné národné zhromaždenie) was the unicameral parliament of the Third Republic of Czechoslovakia from 1946 until 1948. Only one election was ever held, in May 1946.

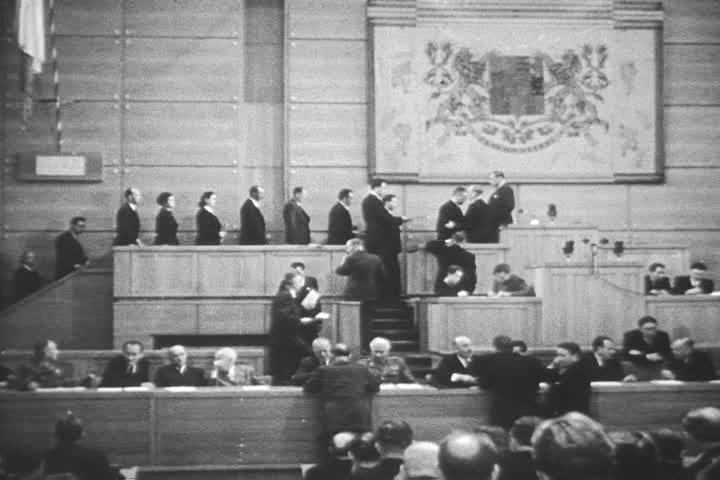
Members of the Assembly pledging allegiance

The Constituent National Assembly was a successor to the Interim National Assembly. Democracy in Czechoslovakia ended in the Czechoslovak coup d'état of February 1948, where the Communist Party took power. Democracy was not restored until 41 years later.

== Presidents of the Constituent National Assembly ==
Name	Party	Entered office	Left office
Antonín Zápotocký	Communist Party of Czechoslovakia	18 June 1946	18 July 1946
Josef David	Czechoslovak National Social Party	18 July 1946	30 May 1948
