= Democratic Party (Slovakia, 1944) =

Democratic Party Demokratická strana
- Abbreviation: DS
- Founded: September 1944
- Banned: February 1948
- Succeeded by: Party of Slovak Revival (minority)
- Headquarters: Gorkého ulica 19, Bratislava, Slovakia
- Ideology: Conservatism; Agrarianism
- Political position: Centre-right
- National affiliation: National Front (1945–1948)
- Colours: Blue

The Democratic Party (Slovak: Demokratická strana) was a conservative political party in Slovakia, existing during the final phase of World War II and the Third Czechoslovak Republic, from 1944 to 1948.

== History ==
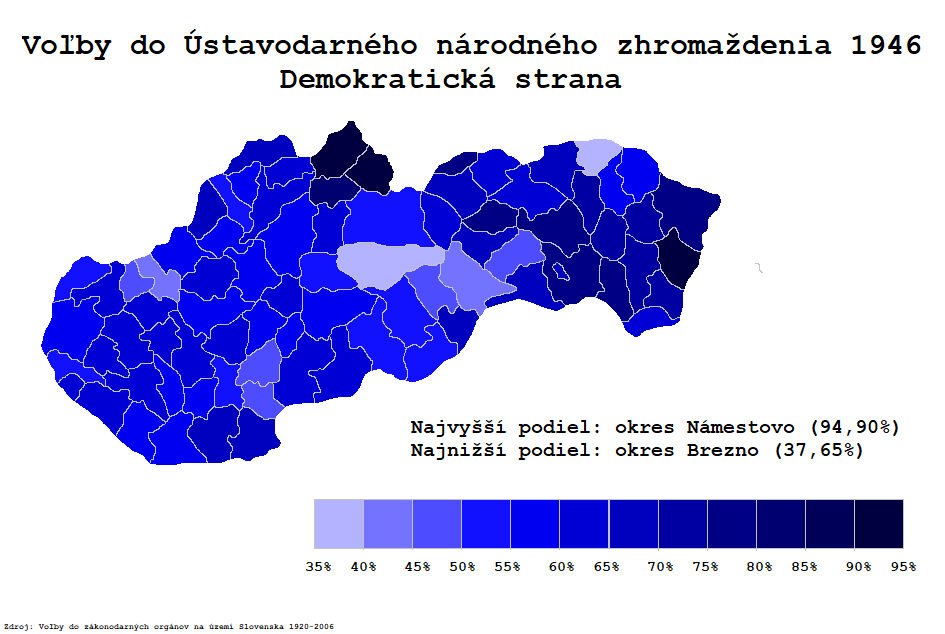
Performance of DS at the 1946 election by districts. Strongest: Námestovo (94.9%); weakest: Brezno (37.65%)

It arose during the 1944 Slovak National Uprising as a party for all non-communist participants (i.e. the counterpart of the Communist Party of Slovakia). It was led by Ján Ursíny (1896–1972), Vavro Šrobár (1867–1950) and Jozef Lettrich (1905–1969). All three had been members of the agrarian Republican Party of Farmers and Peasants before World War II. In the 1946 elections in Czechoslovakia, the party won as much as 62% of the Slovak votes and 43 of 300 seats in the Czechoslovak Constituent National Assembly.

However, the party was disempowered in 1947–48 by the Communists, who had a majority in the central government in Prague (because unlike in Slovakia, the Communists had won the 1946 elections in the Czech lands). Following the Communist takeover in the February 1948 coup d'état, the party was disbanded. Ursíny was imprisoned for several years, while Lettrich fled to the United States and became a leader of the Council of Free Czechoslovakia exile organisation. Those members who accepted the communist dominance reorganised in March 1948 as the Party of Slovak Revival (Strana slovenskej obrody, SSO), a bloc party within the pro-communist National Front.

In December 1989, at the end of the Velvet Revolution, the Party of Slovak Revival rebranded itself as a new Democratic Party, claiming to be a continuation of the 1940s Democratic Party.

== Election results ==
| Year | Leader | Vote | Vote % | Seats | Place | Government |
|---|---|---|---|---|---|---|
| 1946 | Jozef Lettrich | 999,622 | 14.1 | 43 / 300 | 6th | Yes |
