= Labour Party (Slovakia) =

Labour Party Strana práce
- Leader: Ivan Frlička
- Honorary Chairman: Ivan Dérer
- Founded: March 1946
- Dissolved: April 1948
- Headquarters: Bratislava, Czechoslovakia
- Ideology: Social democracy
- Political position: Centre-left
- National affiliation: National Front

Labour Party (Slovak: Strana práce) also known as Social Democracy in Slovakia (Slovak: Sociálna demokracia na Slovensku) was a political party in the post-World War II Slovakia. The party was formed in 1946 by Social Democrats who opposed cooperation with the Communist Party. In 1947 party were incorporated as autonomous regional branch to Czechoslovak Social Democracy. The most influential political figure was Ivan Dérer.

In 1946 Czechoslovak parliamentary election party got two mandates of 300 seats in National Assembly and two mandates of 69 seats in Slovak National Council. After the 1948 Czechoslovak coup d'état, the party was disbanded.
