= Jozef Lettrich =

Slovak writer and politician

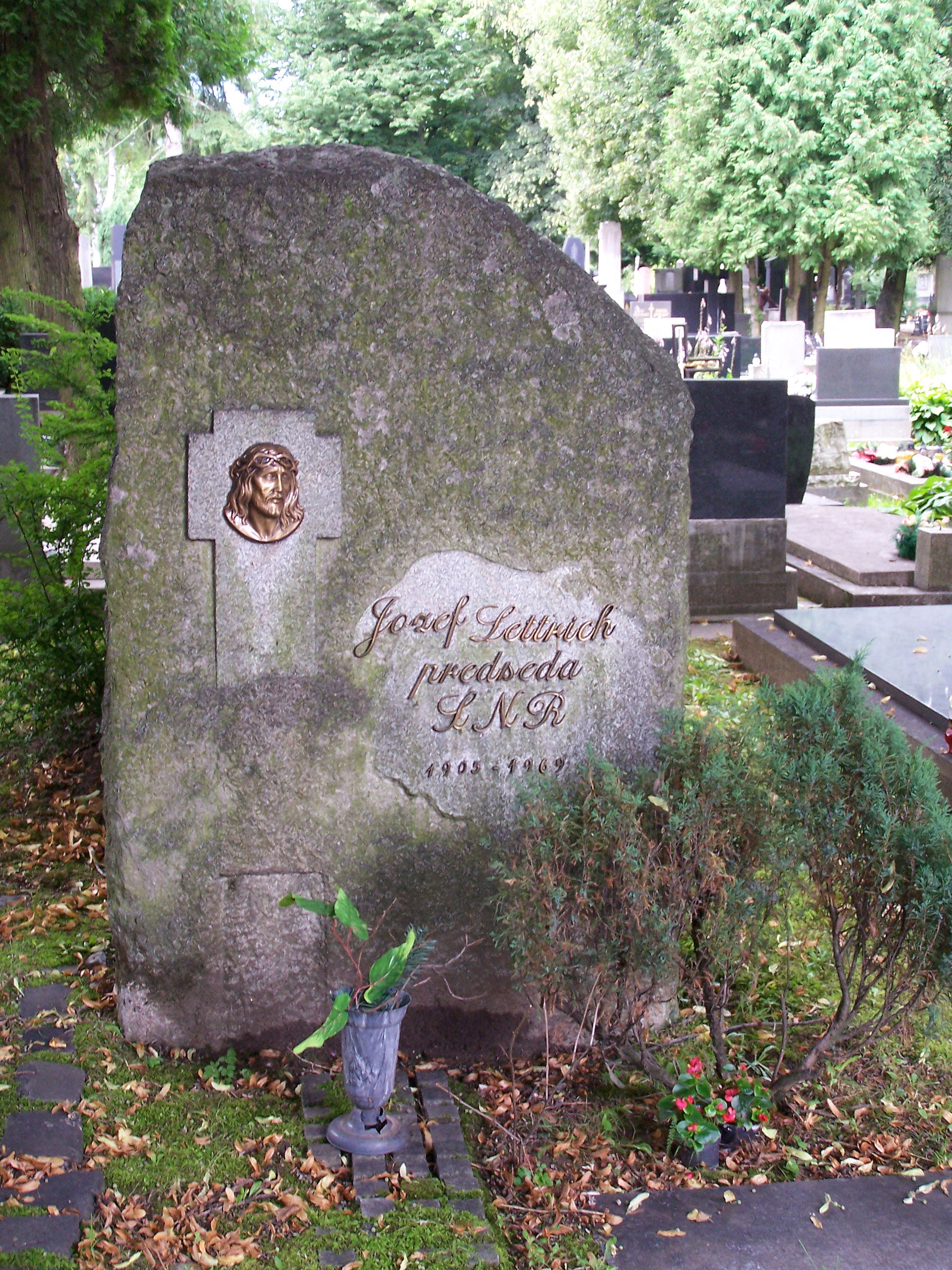
Jozef Lettrich's grave at the National Cemetery in Martin

Jozef Lettrich (17 June 1905 in Turčianske Teplice — 29 November 1969 in New York City) was a Slovak writer and politician.

Lettrich is best known as the leader of the non-Communist, big tent Democratic Party between 1944 and 1948. Lettrich opposed the Nazi-allied Ľudaks who ruled Slovakia during World War II, and he was one of the organizers of the 1944 Slovak National Uprising. After the war, his party won the majority of Slovak votes in the 1946 Czechoslovak parliamentary election. Following the Communist Uprisings of February 1948, he fled Slovakia for the United States where he was one of the most prominent Czechoslovak emigres, known for his anti-communist writings.
