= Third Czechoslovak Republic =

Czechoslovak state from 1945 to 1948

Coordinates: 50.0833°N 14.4667°E

Czechoslovak Republic Československá republika
- 1945–1948
- Flag Coat of arms
- Motto: Pravda vítězí / Pravda víťazí "Truth prevails"
- Anthem: Kde domov můj (Czech); Where Is My Home; Nad Tatrou sa blýska (Slovak); Lightning Over the Tatras
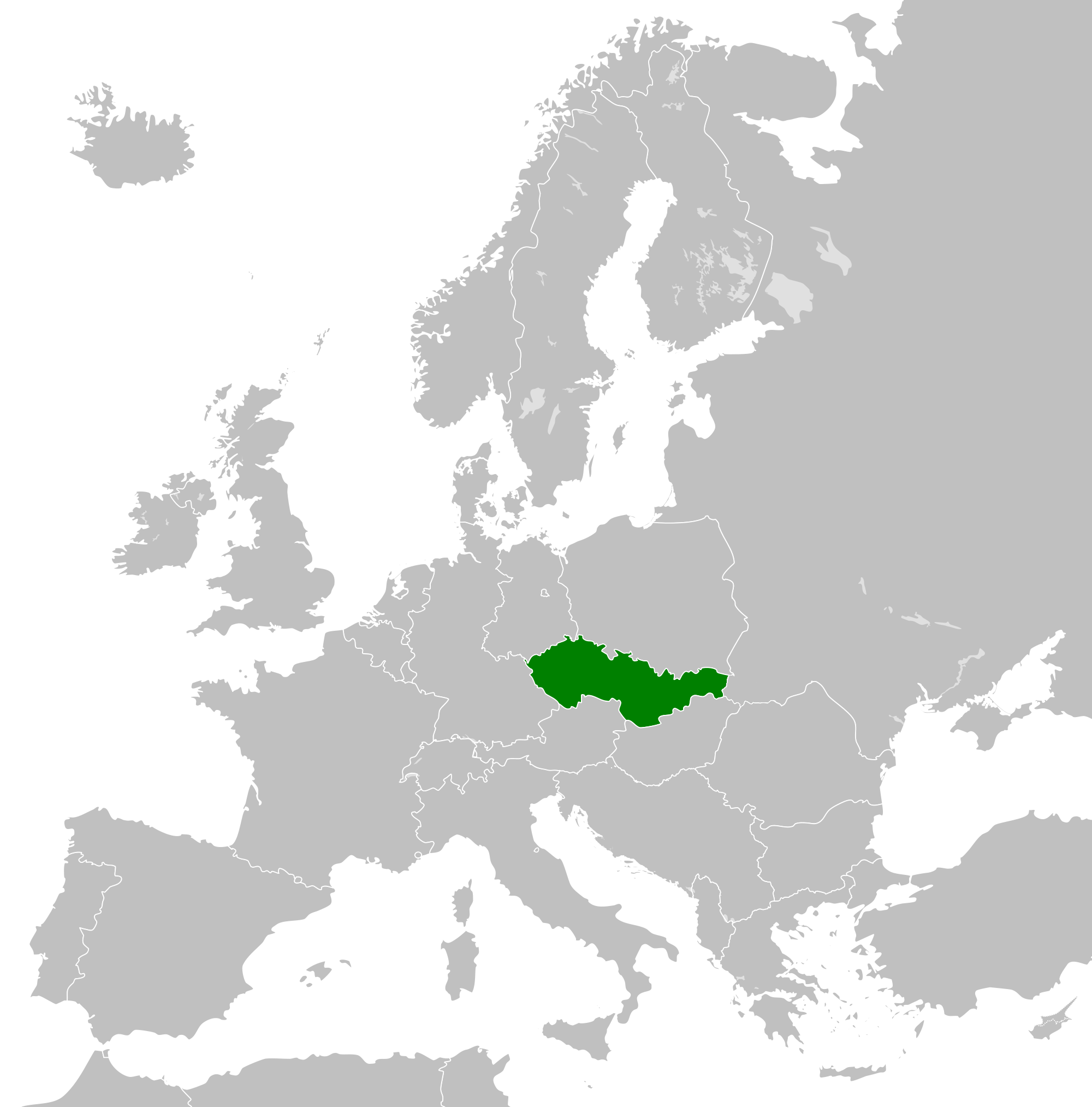
- Territory of the Third Czechoslovak Republic
- Capital and largest city: Prague
- Official languages: Czechoslovak (Czech and Slovak)
- Government: Unitary parliamentary republic
- President
  - 1945–1948: Edvard Beneš
- Prime Minister
  - 1945–1946: Zdeněk Fierlinger
  - 1946–1948: Klement Gottwald
- Historical era: Cold War
  - Surrender of Nazi Germany: 8 May 1945
  - Communist seizure of power: 25 February 1948
- Currency: Czechoslovak koruna
Preceded by
Protectorate of Bohemia and Moravia
Slovak Republic
Nazi Germany
Kingdom of Hungary
Provisional Government of Czechoslovakia
Succeeded by
Fourth Czechoslovak Republic
- Today part of: Czech Republic; Slovakia

The Third Czechoslovak Republic, (Note: Czech: Třetí Československá republika; Slovak: Tretia česko-slovenská republika) officially the Czechoslovak Republic, (Note: Czech: Československá republika; Slovak: Československá republika) was a sovereign state from April 1945 to February 1948 following the end of World War II.

The occupation of Czechoslovakia by Nazi Germany ended in 1945, and the country was reformed by the Soviet Union. It was reassigned borders that were coterminous with those of the First Czechoslovak Republic, the country's pre-war predecessor state, before the 1938 Munich Agreement. It likewise had its predecessor's international recognition restored. Due to the rise of the Communist Party of Czechoslovakia (KSČ), Czechoslovakia fell within the Soviet sphere of influence, and this circumstance dominated any plans or strategies for post-war reconstruction. Consequently, the political and economic organisation of Czechoslovakia became largely a matter of negotiations between Edvard Beneš and the Communist Party members exiled in Moscow.

As early as July 1947, Soviet leader Joseph Stalin intervened against Czechoslovak participation in the Marshall Plan, and Beneš's concept of a so-called "bridge" between East and West was negated, which meant that the alliance treaty with France was not implemented. Moscow expressed doubts about the declared parliamentary path to socialism and subsequently called on the Communist Party of Czechoslovakia to take power quickly. In February 1948, the Communists finally managed to provoke non-Communist parties into attempting to change the previous coalition government of Klement Gottwald and used the situation for a political coup. Czechoslovakia thus became part of the Soviet sphere of interest and later also of Stalin's power bloc.

In February 1948, the Communist Party seized full power in a coup d'état. Despite the country's official name remaining the Czechoslovak Republic until 1960, when it was changed to the Czechoslovak Socialist Republic, events of February 1948 are considered the end of the Third Republic.

== History ==
=== 1945 ===
The Third Republic came into being in April 1945 with the creation of the Košice Programme. All of the remaining German armed forces also surrendered to the Allies on 8 May 1945. President Beneš flew from his exile in London to Košice in eastern Slovakia, which had been taken by the Red Army and which became the temporary capital. In Košice the new National Front government was formed, based on discussions dating back to 1943, with Beneš remaining president, Zdeněk Fierlinger becoming prime minister with Klement Gottwald as deputy premier.

In the National Front coalition, three socialist parties—KSČ, Czechoslovak Social Democratic Party, and Czechoslovak National Social Party—predominated. The Slovak Popular Party was banned as a collaborationist with the Nazis. Other conservative yet democratic parties, such as the Republican Party of Farmers and Peasants (RSZML), were prevented from resuming activities in the postwar period. Certain acceptable nonsocialist parties were included in the coalition; among them were the Catholic People's Party (in Moravia) and the Slovak Democratic Party.

The government moved back to Prague after its liberation on 10 May. Beneš was pressured by the Soviet Union to grant them the Carpathian Ruthenia territory as a sort of war reparation, and a treaty was signed on 29 June 1945 annexing it to the Ukrainian SSR of the Soviet Union.

Industries, employing 61.2 percent of the industrial labour force, were nationalised.

14 October 1945 saw a new provisional national assembly voted in.

Beneš had compromised with the KSČ to avoid a postwar coup; he naïvely hoped that the democratic process would restore a more equitable distribution of power. Beneš had negotiated the Soviet alliance, but at the same time, he hoped to establish Czechoslovakia as a "bridge" between East and West, capable of maintaining contacts with both sides. The KSČ leader Klement Gottwald, however, professed commitment to a "gradualist" approach, that is, to a KSČ assumption of power by democratic means.

The popular enthusiasm evoked by the Soviet armies of liberation benefited the KSČ. Czechs, bitterly disappointed by the West at the Munich Agreement, responded favourably to both the KSČ and the Soviet alliance. Communists secured strong representation in the popularly elected national committees, the new organs of local administration. The KSČ organised and centralised the trade union movement; of 120 representatives to the Central Council of Trades Unions, 94 were communists. The party worked to acquire a mass membership, including peasants and the petite bourgeoisie, as well as the proletariat. Between May 1945 and May 1946, KSČ membership grew from 27,000 to over 1.1 million.

=== 1946 ===
In the May 1946 election, the KSČ won in the Czech part of the country (40.17%), while the anti-Communist Democratic Party won in Slovakia (62%). In sum, however, the KSČ won a plurality of 38 percent of the vote at the Czechoslovak level. Beneš continued as president of the republic, and Jan Masaryk, son of the revered founding father, continued as foreign minister. Gottwald became prime minister. Most importantly, although the communists held only a minority of portfolios, they were able to gain control over such key ministries as information, internal trade, finance, and interior (including the police apparatus). Through these ministries, the communists were able to suppress noncommunist opposition, place party members in positions of power, and create a solid basis for a takeover attempt.

=== 1947 ===
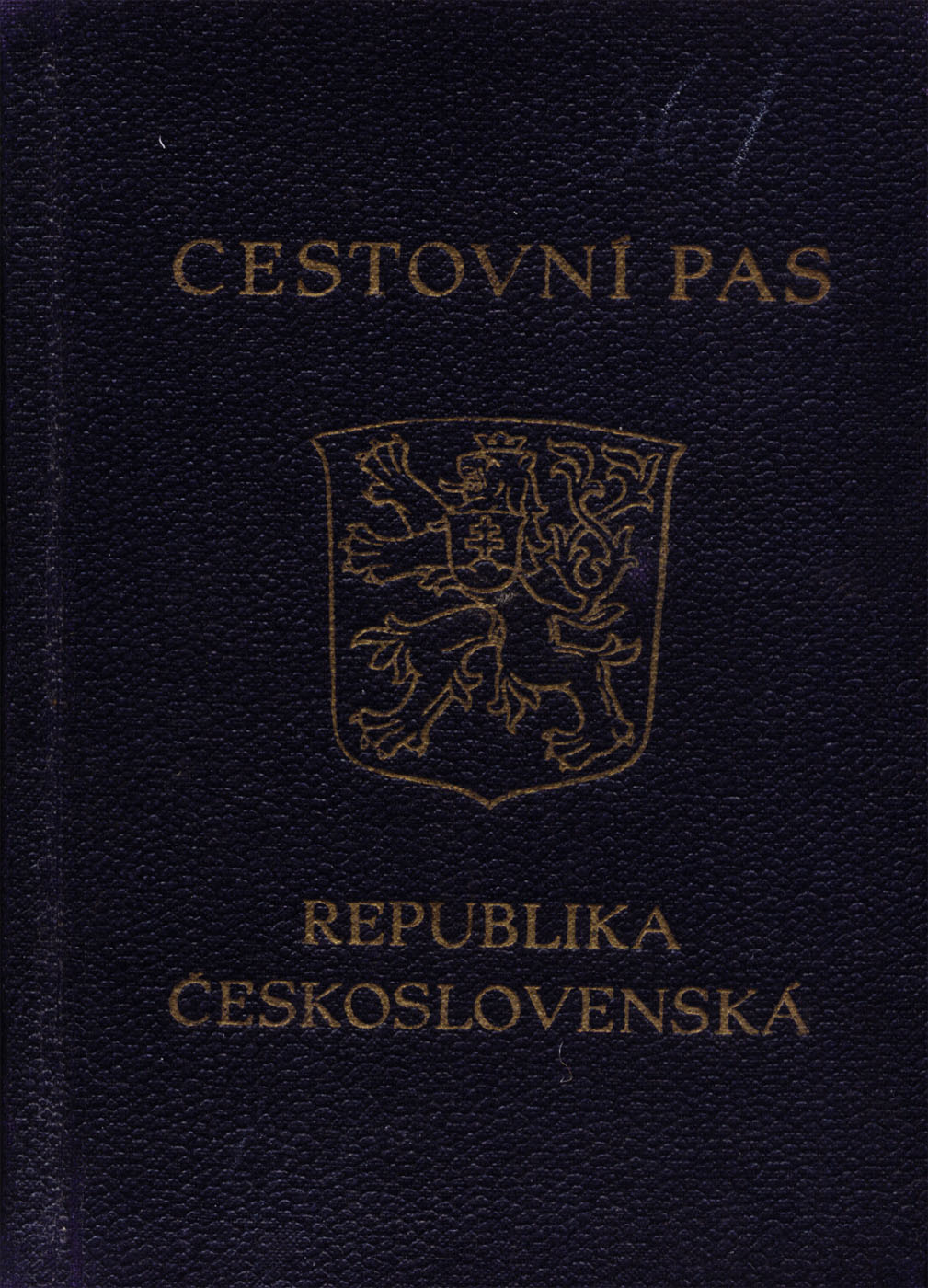
Czechoslovak passport issued in 1947

The year that followed was uneventful. The KSČ continued to proclaim its national and democratic orientation. The turning point came in the summer of 1947. In July, the Czechoslovak government, with KSČ approval, accepted an Anglo-French invitation to attend preliminary discussions of the Marshall Plan. The Soviet Union responded immediately to the Czechoslovak move to continue the Western alliance: Stalin summoned Gottwald to Moscow.

Upon his return to Prague, the KSČ reversed its decision. In subsequent months, the party demonstrated a significant radicalisation of its tactics. The KSČ argued that a reactionary coup was imminent and that immediate action was necessary to prevent it. Through media and police means, they intensified their activity. Originally announced by Gottwald at the KSČ Central Committee meeting in November 1947, news of the "reactionary plot" was disseminated throughout the country by the communist press.

From June of that year, and especially after the outbreak of the 1947–1948 civil war in Mandatory Palestine in November, Czechoslovakia began to sell arms to the Palestinian Jewish Haganah defense force. It was the only foreign state to do so. This policy, continued after the declaration of the State of Israel the following year, would play an important role in the victory of the Jewish state in the 1948 Arab–Israeli War.

=== 1948 ===
In January 1948, the communist-controlled Ministry of Interior proceeded to purge the Czechoslovak security forces, substituting noncommunists with communists. Simultaneously, the KSČ began agitating for increased nationalisation and for a new land reform limiting landholdings to fifty hectares.

A cabinet crisis precipitated the February coup. Backed by all non-communist parties, the National Social ministers said that the communists were using the Ministry of Interior's police and security forces to suppress non-communists, and demanded a halt to this. Prime Minister Gottwald, however, repeatedly forestalled discussion of the police issue. On 21 February, National Socialists resigned from the cabinet in protest. The Catholic People's Party and the Slovak Democratic Party followed suit.

The twelve noncommunist ministers resigned, in part, to induce Beneš to call for early elections. Communist losses were anticipated owing to popular disapproval of recent KSČ tactics. A January poll indicated a 10-percent decline in Communist electoral support. Yet the Czechoslovak National Socialists made their move without adequate coordination with Beneš. The democratic parties, in addition, made no effort to rally popular support.

The non-Communists believed that Beneš would refuse to accept their resignations and keep them in a caretaker government, which would presumably force Gottwald to either back down or resign. Beneš initially refused to accept the resignations and declared that no government could be formed without non-Communist ministers. However, in the days that followed, he shunned the non-Communist ministers to avoid accusations of collusion. The Czechoslovak Army remained neutral.

In the meantime, the KSČ garnered its forces. The communist-controlled Ministry of Interior deployed police regiments to sensitive areas and equipped a workers' militia. The communist-controlled Ministry of Information refused broadcasting time to noncommunist officials. Ministries held by noncommunist parties were secured by communist "action committees." The action committees also purged all governmental and political party organs of unreliable elements. Gottwald threatened to call a general strike unless Beneš appointed a new, Communist-dominated government.

On 26 February, Beneš, perhaps fearing civil war and/or Soviet intervention, capitulated. He accepted the resignations of the dissident ministers and appointed a new cabinet from a list submitted by Gottwald. The new cabinet was dominated by Communists and pro-Soviet Social Democrats. Members of the People's, National Socialist, and Czech Democratic parties were also included, so the government was still nominally a coalition. However, except for Jan Masaryk, the non-Communist ministers were fellow travellers working hand in glove with the Communists. This act marked the onset of out-and-out Communist rule in Czechoslovakia.
