= Klement Gottwald =

Leader of Czechoslovakia from 1948 to 1953

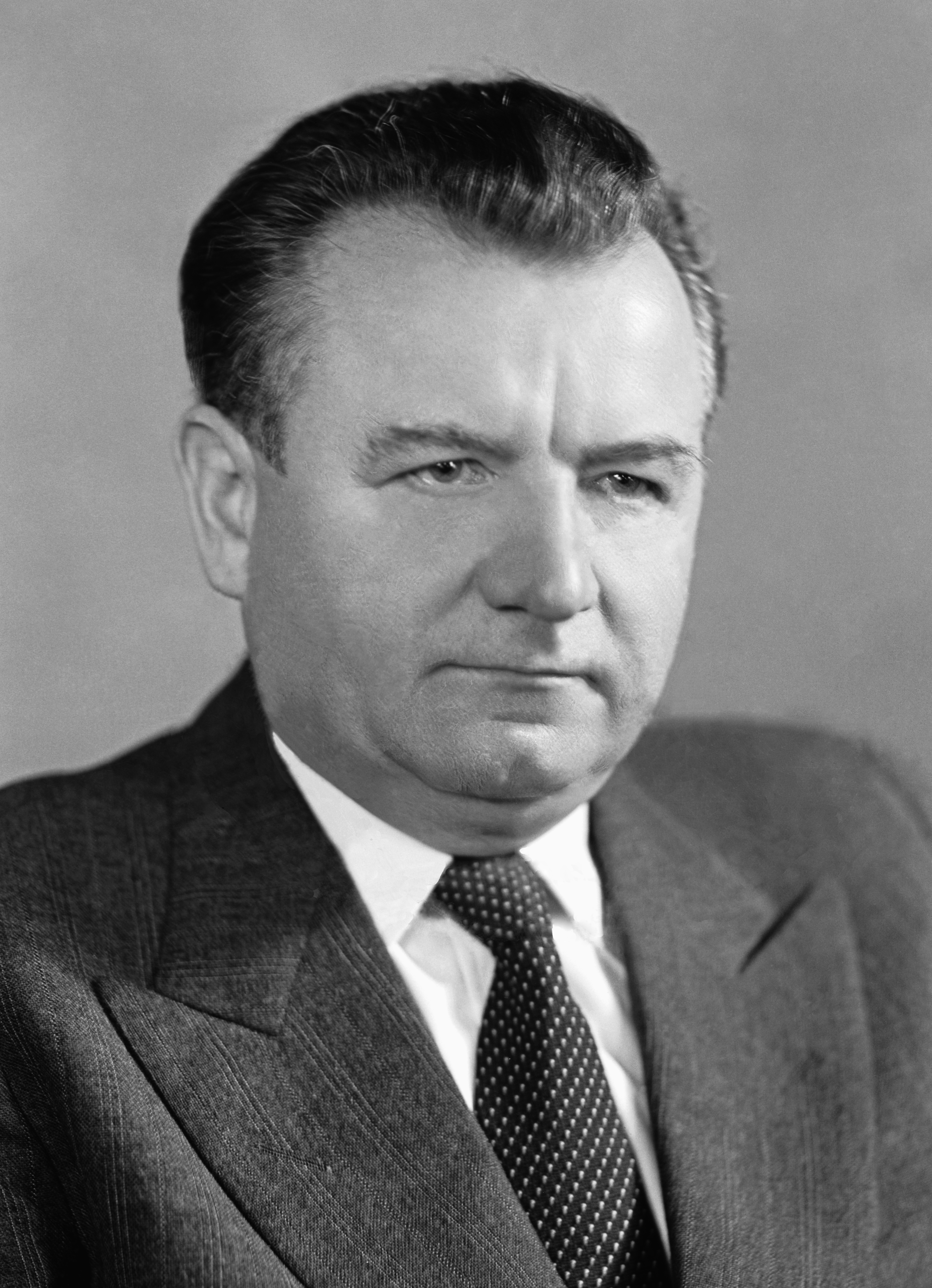
- Gottwald in 1948

Chairman of the Communist Party of Czechoslovakia
- In office 23 February 1929 – 14 March 1953 (General Secretary 1929–1945)
- Preceded by: Bohumil Jílek (General Secretary)
- Succeeded by: Antonín Novotný (First Secretary)

President of Czechoslovakia
- In office 14 June 1948 – 14 March 1953
- Prime Minister: Antonín Zápotocký
- Preceded by: Edvard Beneš
- Succeeded by: Antonín Zápotocký

Prime Minister of Czechoslovakia
- In office 2 July 1946 – 15 June 1948
- President: Edvard Beneš
- Preceded by: Zdenek Fierlinger
- Succeeded by: Antonín Zápotocký

Personal details
- Born: 23 November 1896 Dědice or Hoštice-Heroltice, Austria-Hungary
- Died: 14 March 1953 (aged 56) Prague, Czechoslovakia
- Party: KSČ
- Spouse: Marta Holubová (m. 1928)
- Children: 1
- Profession: Cabinetmaker; newspaper editor

Military service
- Allegiance: Austria-Hungary; Czechoslovakia
- Branch/service: Austro-Hungarian Army; Czechoslovak Army
- Years of service: 1915–1918; 1918–1920
- Battles/wars: World War I
- De facto ruler of the ČSSR: ← (First in role); Novotný →

Klement Gottwald (Czech pronunciation: [ˈklɛmɛnt ˈɡotvalt]; 23 November 1896 – 14 March 1953) was a Czech communist revolutionary and politician, who was the leader of the Communist Party of Czechoslovakia from 1929 until his death in 1953, titled as general secretary until 1945 and as chairman from 1945 to 1953. He was the first leader of Communist Czechoslovakia from 1948 to 1953.

Following the collapse of democratic Czechoslovakia after the Munich Agreement, the right-wing leadership of the Czechoslovak Second Republic banned the Communist Party, forcing Gottwald to emigrate to the Soviet Union in November 1938. In 1943, Gottwald agreed with representatives of the Czechoslovak-government-in-exile located in London, along with President Edvard Beneš, to unify domestic and foreign anti-fascist resistance and form the National Front. He was the 14th prime minister of Czechoslovakia from July 1946 until June 1948, the first Communist to hold the post. In June 1948, he was elected as Czechoslovakia's first Communist president, four months after the 1948 coup d'état in which his party seized power with the backing of the Soviet Union. He held the post until his death.

== Early life ==
Klement Gottwald was born on 23 November 1896, but it is unclear if in Dědice (today part of Vyškov) or in Hoštice-Heroltice. His mother was an unmarried maidservant. Before World War I he was trained in Vienna as a carpenter but also actively participated in the activities of the Social Democratic youth movement.

=== Military service ===
From 1915 to 1918 Gottwald was a soldier in the Austro-Hungarian Army. It is believed that he fought in the Battle of Zborov, which would mean that he fought there against future General and President Ludvík Svoboda, who fought on the side of the Czechoslovak Legion. Thomas Jakl of the Military History Institute called Gottwald's participation in the Battle of Zborov a legend: Gottwald was in a hospital in Vienna during the time of the battle. In the summer of 1918, Gottwald deserted from the army. After the establishment of the first Czechoslovak Republic, he served for two years in the Czechoslovak Army. From 1920 to 1921 he worked in Rousinov as a cabinetmaker.

== Career ==
=== Sports instructor and journalist ===
After the collapse of the Workers' Gymnastic Union, the Communist-oriented party of the organization split off in 1921 and created the Federation of Workers' Gymnastic Unions (FDTJ). Gottwald was able to unify the organization to gain considerable power in the local districts, and became the starosta of the 20th district of the FDTJ. In June 1921, he participated in the first Spartakiada in Prague. In September 1921 he moved from Rousinov to Banská Bystrica, where he became the editor of the communist magazine Hlas Ľudu ("Voice of the people" in Slovak). At the same time, he was planning FDTJ events at the Banská Bystrica district. He became the local starosta of the district, and was the managing director of the 47th district of the FDTJ. Later, he moved to Žilina and became editor in chief of Spartakus magazine. In 1922 he moved to Vrútky, where by decision of the Communist Party Central Committee, they merged a number of communist magazines and consolidated editors. In 1924, the editorial staff, along with Gottwald, moved to Ostrava.

=== Beginning of political activity ===
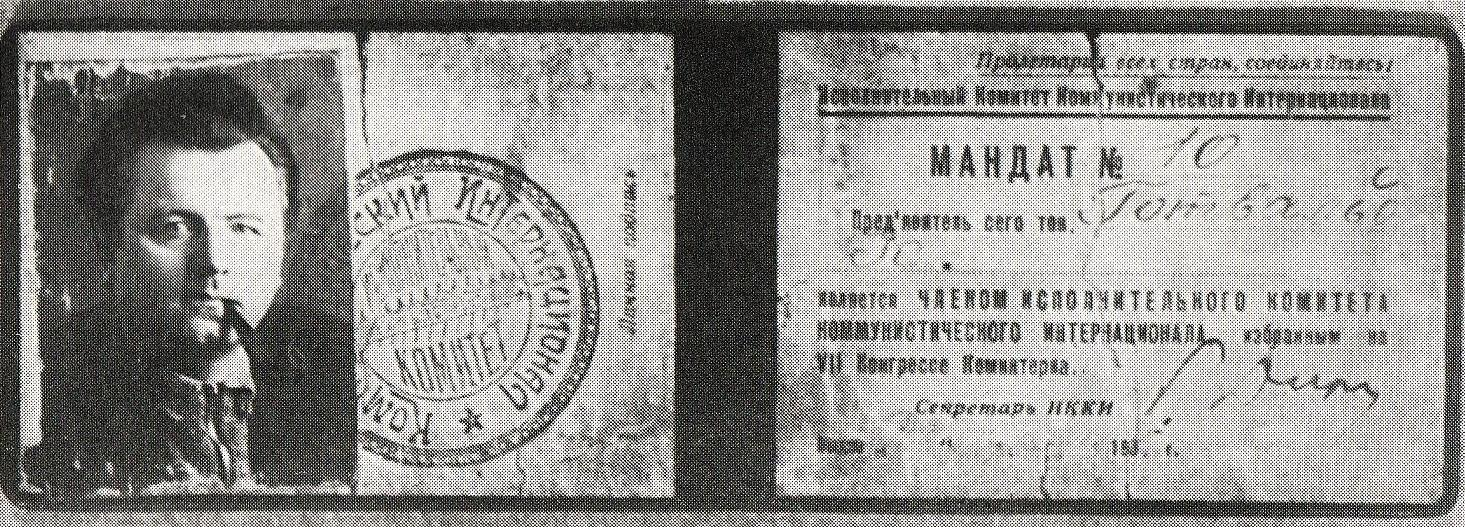
Gottwald's identification card during his time in the Comintern, 1935

In 1926, Gottwald became a functionary of the Communist Party of Czechoslovakia (KSČ), and editor of the Communist Press. From 1926 to 1929 he worked in Prague, where he aided the Secretariat of the KSČ to form a pro-Moscow opposition against the anti-Moscow leadership then in power. From 1928 he was a member of the Comintern. Following a Comintern policy initiated by Stalin, he carried out the Bolshevization of the Party.

In February 1929, at the Fifth Congress of the KSČ, Gottwald was elected party general secretary, alongside Josef Guttmann, Jan Šverma, Rudolf Slánský, Václav Kopecký and Pavel Reiman, together known as the Karlín Boys.

In the second half of 1930, the Communist Party carried out a number of reforms in accordance and response with the changes in those of the foreign policy of the Soviet Union, namely the introduction of the policy on the formation of a popular front against fascism. In September and October 1938, Gottwald was one of the main leaders of the opposition against the adoption of the Munich Agreement.

=== Exile to the USSR ===
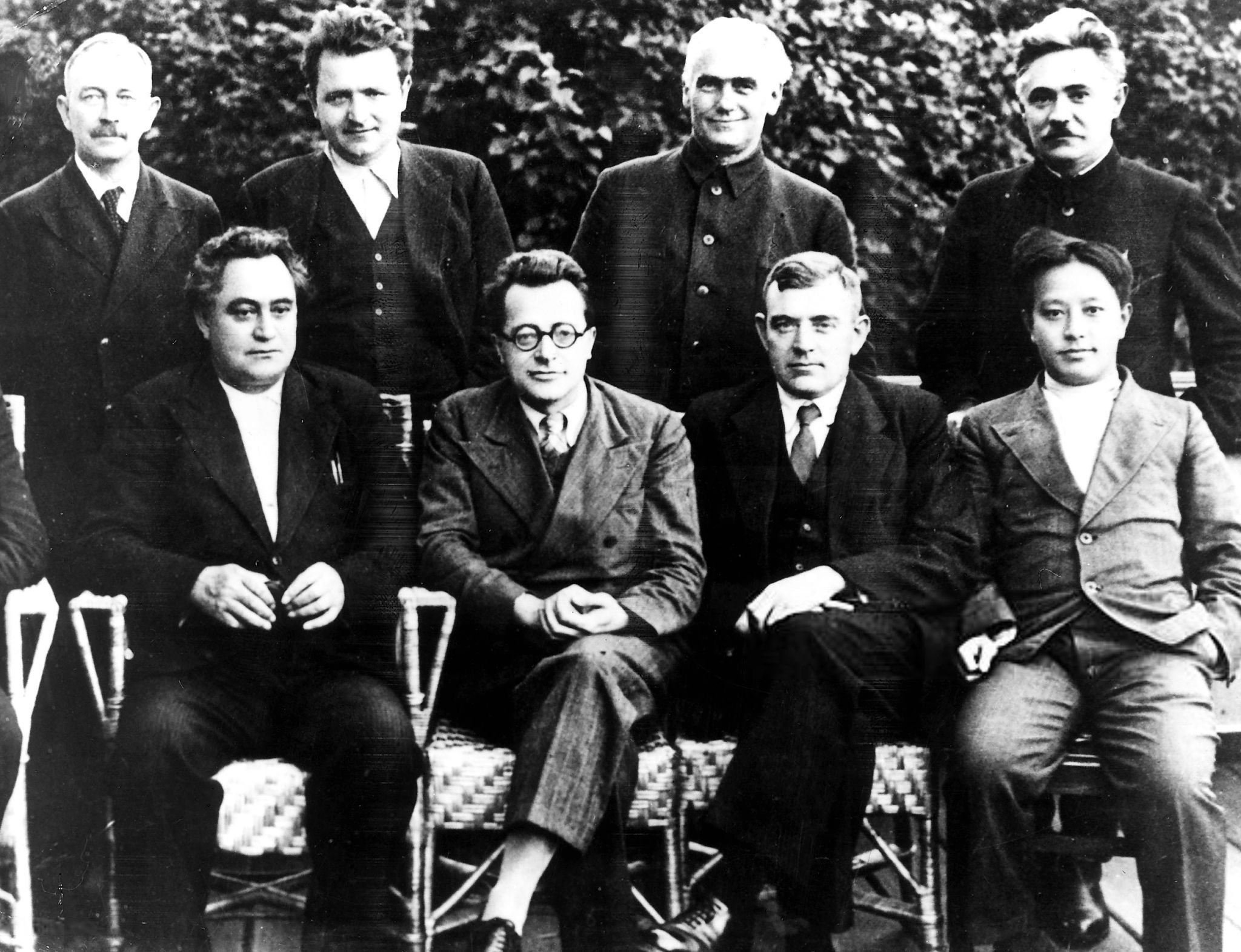
Members of the Executive Committee of the Comintern at the 7th World Congress, 1935. Seated (L-R): Georgi Dimitrov, Palmiro Togliatti, Wilhelm Florin, Wang Ming. Standing: Otto Kuusinen, Dmitry Manuilsky, Klement Gottwald, Wilhelm Pieck.

After the banning of the Communist Party, Gottwald emigrated to the Soviet Union in November 1938. While there, he opposed the party policy of backing the Molotov–Ribbentrop pact of 1939. After the attack on the Soviet Union in June 1941, Soviet leadership saw the front against fascism as a great opportunity to assert themselves in Czechoslovakia, promoting interest in supporting Gottwald after the liberation of Czechoslovakia. In 1943, Gottwald agreed with representatives of the Czechoslovak government-in-exile located in London, along with President Edvard Beneš, to unify domestic and foreign anti-fascist resistance and form the National Front. This proved helpful for Gottwald as it helped secure Communist influence in post-war Czechoslovakia.

=== Return to Czechoslovakia and events leading up to the coup ===
In 1945, Gottwald gave up the general secretary's post to Rudolf Slánský and was elected to the new position of party chairman. On 10 May 1945, Gottwald returned to Prague as the deputy premier under Zdeněk Fierlinger and as the chairman of the National Front. In March 1946, he became prime minister after leading the KSČ to a 38% share of the vote. This was easily the best showing for a Czechoslovak party in a free election at the time; previously, no party had ever won more than 25 percent.

Gottwald was a firm supporter of the expulsion of ethnic Germans from Czechoslovakia, gaining mainstream credibility with many Czechs through the use of nationalist rhetoric, exhorting the population to "prepare for the final retribution for White Mountain, for the return of the Czech lands to the Czech people. We will expel for good all descendants of the alien German nobility." On the contrary, when Gottwald and the Communists took power in 1948, they put an end to the policy of persecution and expulsion of minorities forwarded by the nationalists and Benes, otherwise the Germans in fact sought help from the Russians against the Czechs.

== Сoup d'état ==
By the summer of 1947, however, the KSČ's popularity had significantly dwindled, particularly after the Soviets pressured Czechoslovakia to turn down Marshall Plan aid after initially accepting it. Most observers believed Gottwald would be turned out of office at the elections due in May 1948. The Communists' dwindling popularity, combined with France and Italy dropping the Communists from their coalition governments, prompted Joseph Stalin to order Gottwald to begin efforts to eliminate parliamentary opposition to Communism in Czechoslovakia.

Outwardly, though, Gottwald kept up the appearance of working within the system, announcing that he intended to lead the Communists to an absolute majority in the upcoming election—something no Czechoslovak party had ever done. The endgame began in February 1948, when a majority of the Cabinet directed the Communist interior minister, Václav Nosek, to stop packing the police force with Communists. Nosek ignored this directive, with Gottwald's support. In response, 12 non-Communist ministers resigned. They believed that without their support, Gottwald would be unable to govern and be forced to either give way or resign. Beneš initially supported their position, and refused to accept their resignations. At that point, Gottwald dropped all pretense of liberal democracy. He not only refused to resign, but demanded the appointment of a Communist-dominated government under threat of a general strike. His Communist colleagues occupied the offices of the non-Communist ministers.

On 25 February, Beneš, fearing Soviet intervention, gave in. He accepted the resignations of the non-Communist ministers and appointed a new government in accordance with Gottwald's specifications. Although ostensibly still a coalition, it was dominated by Communists and pro-Moscow Social Democrats. The other parties were still nominally represented, but with the exception of Foreign Minister Jan Masaryk they were fellow travellers handpicked by the Communists. From this date forward, Gottwald was effectively the most powerful man in Czechoslovakia.

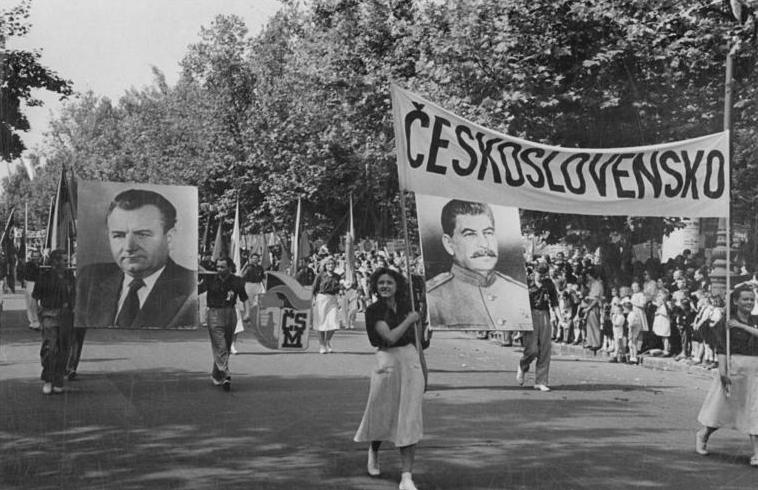
Celebration of the 2nd World Festival of Youth and Students in August 1949, Budapest, Hungary. The photograph shows the Czechoslovak delegation; left is a portrait of Gottwald, on the right, Stalin.

On 9 May, the National Assembly, now a docile tool of the Communists, approved the so-called Ninth-of-May Constitution. While it was not a completely Communist document, its Communist imprint was strong enough that Beneš refused to sign it. Later that month, elections were held in which voters were presented with a single list from the National Front, now a Communist-controlled patriotic organization. Beneš resigned on 2 June. In accordance with the 1920 Constitution, Gottwald took over most presidential functions until 14 June, when he was formally elected as President.

== Leadership of Czechoslovakia ==
Gottwald initially tried to take a semi-independent line. However, that changed shortly after a meeting with Stalin. Under Stalin's direction, Gottwald imposed the Stalinist Soviet model of government on the country. He nationalized the country's industry and initiated the collectivization of Czechoslovak farms. There was considerable resistance within the government to Soviet influence on Czechoslovak politics. In response, Gottwald instigated a series of purges. Perceived opponents were often jailed or condemned to forced labor. His regime conducted a number of show trials, including the trial of the non-Communist politician Milada Horáková, who was executed in June 1950, as well as fellow comrades and Communist party leaders Rudolf Slánský and Vlado Clementis, both of whom were executed in December 1952. Many Communist leaders subjected to show trials had been part of a tight-knit group of Communists around Gottwald in the interwar period. In a famous photograph from 21 February 1948, described also in The Book of Laughter and Forgetting by Milan Kundera, Clementis stands next to Gottwald. When Clementis was charged in 1950, he was erased from the photograph (along with the photographer Karel Hájek) by the state propaganda department.

== Personal life ==
Klement Gottwald was married to Marta Gottwaldová who came from a poor family and was an illegitimate child. Although his wife stood by him through his endeavours, and was his faithful companion, she never joined the Communist Party. They had one daughter, Marta (1920–1998), who married Alexey Čepička.

== Death ==
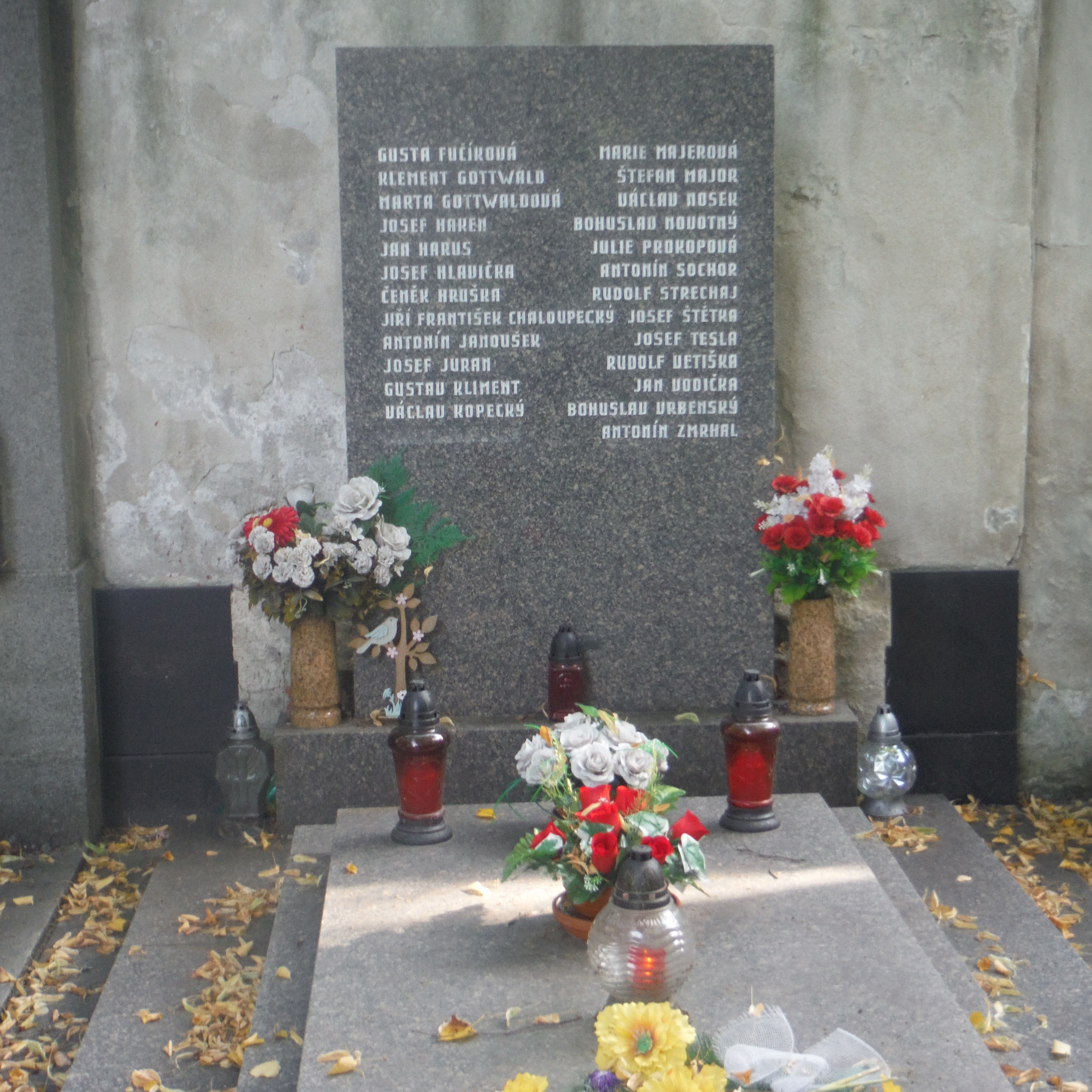
Gottwald's grave in Prague's Olšany Cemetery

Gottwald was a long-time alcoholic and suffered from heart disease caused by syphilis that had gone untreated for several years. Shortly after attending Stalin's funeral on 9 March 1953, one of his arteries burst. He died five days later on 14 March 1953, aged 56. He was the first Czechoslovak president to die in office.

Gottwald's embalmed body was initially displayed in a mausoleum at the site of the Jan Žižka national monument in the district of Žižkov, Prague. In 1962, the personality cult ended and it was no longer deemed appropriate to show Gottwald's body. There are accounts that in 1962 Gottwald's body had blackened and was decomposing due to a botched embalming, although other witnesses have disputed this. His body was cremated, the ashes returned to the Žižka Monument and placed in a sarcophagus.

After the end of the communist period, Gottwald's ashes were removed from the Žižka Monument (in 1990) and placed in a common grave at Prague's Olšany Cemetery, together with the ashes of about 20 other communist leaders which had also originally been placed in the Žižka Monument. The Communist Party of Bohemia and Moravia now maintains that common grave.

== Legacy ==
He was succeeded as de facto leader of Czechoslovakia by Antonín Novotný, who became First Secretary of the KSČ. Antonín Zápotocký, who had been prime minister since 1948, succeeded Gottwald as president.

In tribute, Zlín, a city in Moravia, now the Czech Republic, was renamed Gottwaldov after him from 1949 to 1989. Zmiiv, a city in Kharkiv Oblast, Ukrainian SSR, was named Gotvald after him from 1976 to 1990.

A major square and park in Bratislava was named Gottwaldovo námestie after him, later becoming Námestie Slobody (Freedom square) immediately following the Velvet Revolution. The original eponym persists today, the square being referred to by locals as Gottko. A bridge in Prague that is now called Nuselský Most was once called Gottwaldův Most, and the abutting metro station now called Vyšehrad was called Gottwaldova.

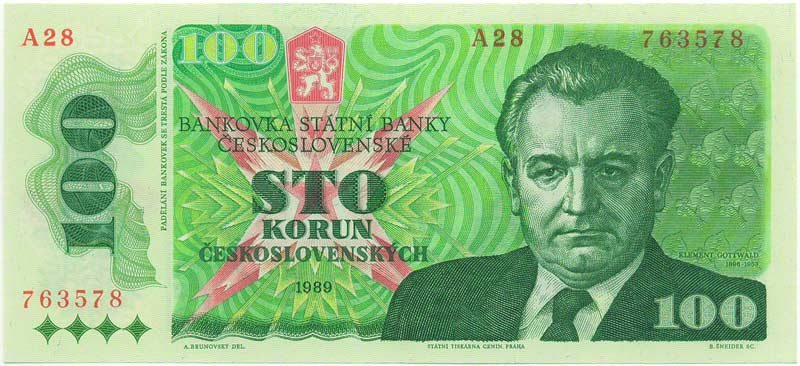
A 1989 100 Koruna depicting Gottwald

A Czechoslovak 100 Koruna banknote issued on 1 October 1989 as part of the 1985–89 banknote series included a portrait of Gottwald. This note was so poorly received by Czechoslovaks that it was removed from official circulation on 31 December 1990 and was promptly replaced with the previous banknote issue of the same denomination.

In 2005 he was voted "The Greatest Villain" in the Největší Čech poll of the Czech Television (a program under the BBC licence 100 Greatest Britons). He received 26% of the votes.

Wiesenau in Brandenburg, (former East) Germany keeps a street named after Gottwald.

== See also ==
- History of Czechoslovakia
- Order of Klement Gottwald
- Czechoslovak Communist party
- Photo manipulation
- Prezydent Gottwald (ship)

Political offices
Preceded by Zdeněk Fierlinger	Prime Minister of Czechoslovakia; 2 July 1946 – 15 June 1948	Succeeded by Antonín Zápotocký
Preceded by Edvard Beneš	President of Czechoslovakia; 14 June 1948 – 14 March 1953	Succeeded by Antonín Zápotocký
Party political offices
Preceded by Bohumil Jílek	Chairman of the Communist Party of Czechoslovakia; 1929–1953	Succeeded by Antonín Novotný
