= Zdeněk Fierlinger =

Czechoslovak diplomat and politician

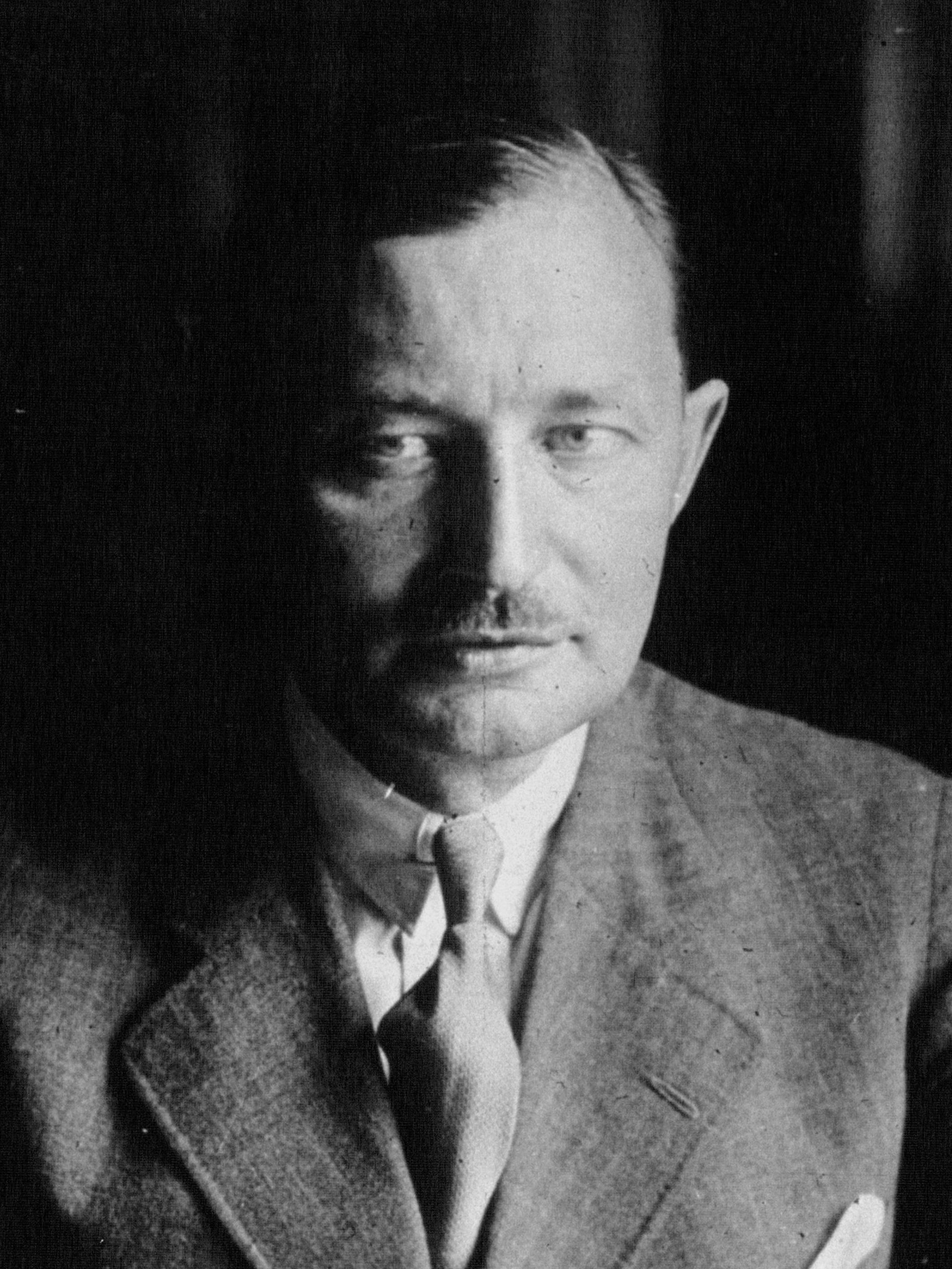

Prime Minister of Czechoslovakia
- In office 5 April 1945 – 2 June 1946
- President: Edvard Beneš
- Preceded by: Jan Šrámek(in exile)
- Succeeded by: Klement Gottwald

Personal details
- Born: 11 June 1891 Olomouc, Austria-Hungary (now Czech Republic)
- Died: 2 May 1976 (aged 84) Prague, Czechoslovakia (now Czech Republic)
- Party: ČSSD (1924–1948); KSČ (1948–1976)

Zdeněk Fierlinger (11 July 1891 – 2 May 1976) was a Czechoslovak diplomat and politician. He served as the prime minister of Czechoslovakia from 1944 to 1946, first in the London-based Czechoslovak government-in-exile and then in liberated Czechoslovakia. Long close to the Soviet Union, he has his name often associated with the merger of his Czech Social Democratic Party with the Czechoslovak Communist Party after the communist coup in 1948.

He was the uncle of Paul Fierlinger, the animator for numerous PBS cartoons.

== Early life ==
Zdeněk Fierlinger came from a lower-middle-class Czech family in the city of Olmütz in Moravia, then part of the Austro-Hungarian Empire (now Olomouc, Czech Republic). His father worked as a teacher of French and English in the local high school. Fierlinger was described as a mediocre student but one who was excellent with languages. He graduated from business school in 1910 in Olmütz and then worked in Russia as a sales agent for the MacCormick International Harvester Company of Chicago in Rostov-on-Don. Fierlinger was one of the 70,000 or so Czechs living in Imperial Russia in 1914.

== First World War ==
He had no loyalty to Austria-Hungary and, like many of the other Czechs living in Russia, chose not to return to the Empire upon the outbreak of the First World War in August 1914 but instead stayed in Russia.

Fierlinger, together with several other Czechs living in Rostov-on-Don, organised themselves into the Česká družina ("Czech Companions"), which joined the Imperial Russian Army to fight in Galicia against Austria. Like many other Czechs of his generation, Fierlinger was a Russophile and saw Russia as the great Slavic power that would liberate the other Slavic peoples like the Czechs from Austrian rule.

During the war, he joined the Czechoslovak Legion, which fought for independence from Austria. He was described as a "brave and selfless soldier". For his bravery on the battlefield, he was awarded the Order of St. George four times. Among other battles, he participated at the Battle of Zborov as the commander of the 9th Company.

After the battle, he was promoted to the commander of a battalion. In July 1917, the Czechoslovak National Council, led by Tomáš Masaryk and Edvard Beneš, sent Fierlinger and Emanuel Voska to the United States. The purpose of the American tour was to recruit Czech-Americans and Slovak-Americans for the Czechoslovak Legion, which led him to spend most of his time in the industrial towns of the Midwest and the Pennsylvania coal and steel towns, and he appealed to Czech and Slovak immigrants to fight for independence from Austria.

After completing his American recruiting tour, he went to France in late 1917 to resume his career with the Czechoslovak Legion. Unlike the other members of the Czechoslovak Legion, who remained in Russia and subsequently fought for the White Movement during the Russian Civil War during an epic march across Siberia, Fierlinger did not share the anticommunist feelings of many veterans of the Czechoslovak Legion although it fought against the Reds. Upon arriving in France, Fierlinger was promoted to the rank of colonel.

The Czechoslovak National Council, which was based in Paris, was recognized in 1918 by the governments of France, the United Kingdom and the United States as a government-in-exile, as the Allies committed themselves to the dissolution of Austria as a war aim. During his time in Paris, Fierlinger first met Beneš, who served as the right-hand man to Masaryk, the leader of the government-in-exile.

Fierlinger got along well with Beneš, who became his patron. The Czech historian Zbyněk Zeman and the German historian Rainer Karlsch wrote: "Neither had close friends and both were industrious and ambitious. There was a trace of arrogance in Fierlinger, who was extremely practical and less academically gifted than Beneš. They complemented each other and the similarities in their character helped to draw them together. Their long association left a strong mark on the history of Czechoslovakia".

In the interwar period, Beneš and Fierlinger lived on the same street in Prague. The villa that Beneš owned in the countryside outside Sezimovo Ústí was next to Fierlinger's villa. Both men ascribed to the same centre-left politics.

Zeman and Karlsch state, "Beneš used Fierlinger as an important piece on the diplomatic chessboard".

== Early diplomatic career ==
After the war, Fierlinger returned to Czechoslovakia and joined the diplomatic service. Masaryk became the first president of Czechoslovakia, and Beneš became the foreign minister. Fierlinger was appointed by Beneš to serve as the chief of the economic section of the Foreign Ministry despite complaints that he lacked a university degree and that he was unsuitable to be a diplomat. He was successively ambassador to the Netherlands, Romania, the United States, Switzerland and Austria. Zeman and Karlsch wrote: "Fierlinger was self-confident, blunt in expressing his views and ready to stand up to the experts". During this period, he was a close friend and collaborator of Edvard Beneš.

In 1924, he joined the Czech Social Democratic Party. From 1925 to 1928, he served as the Czechoslovak minister in Washington, DC, where he developed an illness in his kidneys that required him to go to Switzerland for medical treatment.

During his time as the Czechoslovak minister in Bern, Fierlinger also served as the chief of the Czechoslovak delegation for the League of Nations, which required him to make regular visits to Geneva when the League of Nations was in session. Because of all the member states of the League of Nations were theoretically equal, Beneš as foreign minister attached much importance to the League and felt it was the best institution for allowing a small power like Czechoslovakia to project influence abroad.

Beneš disliked the congress system since the leaders of the great powers would meet to decide the fate of Europe and felt that the leaders of the great powers put their own interests ahead of those of the small powers. As such, Beneš frequently visited Geneva to attend the sessions of the League, where he always pressed for it to become the principal instrument of international diplomacy, instead of the traditional congress system.

During Beneš's visits to Geneva, Fierlinger was known as the only Czechoslovak diplomat who was willing to disagree with Beneš and argued with him about matters such as disarmament and the place of the League in international diplomacy. Fierlinger was regarded as a bumptious and boorish diplomat, but his career flourished because of the patronage of Beneš, who kept "making the excuses" for him by arguing that Fierlinger's lack of a university education and his lower-middle-class background made him somewhat uncouth although Fierlinger had talents that made up for his lack of manners.

Beneš himself came from a lower-middle-class background and, like other Czechoslovak diplomats, resented how European diplomacy was dominated by upper-class men, with a disproportionate number of European diplomats being aristocrats. Beneš felt that many of the complaints against Fierlinger reflected snobbery of the aristocratic-dominated world of European diplomacy.

In the early 1930s under the impact of the Great Depression, Fierlinger's views took a sharp turn to the left as he came to believe the depression proved quite literally the bankruptcy of capitalism as an economic system. Fierlinger came to feel that socialism and a "planned economy" were the solution to the Great Depression. In 1931, he visited the Soviet Union, and in 1932, he published a book, Sovětský svaz na nové dráze (The Soviet Union On A New Track), which recounted his visit in glowing terms. In his book, Fierlinger presented a very uncritical and sympathetic account that portrayed the Soviet Union as something very close to a utopia. He drew a contrast between the economic growth of the First Five Year Plan and said that he saw factories being built everywhere, but in the West, he saw factories being closed.

During the World Disarmament Conference, in Geneva, Fierlinger came into conflict with Beneš who moved him to Vienna as the Czechoslovak minister to Austria. During his time in Vienna, Fierlinger wrote articles in several Czech newspapers to argue for the theory of "convergence", as he argued that the Soviet Union was moving closer to Western political values such as democracy, and the Western nations were moving closer to Soviet economic values. He also maintained that capitalism was a dying system.

Through not a communist, Fierlinger tended to portray the Soviet Union a very favorable light in his articles, and even when he was critical, such criticism was always expressed in the terms of the "convergence theory", as he maintained that inevitably the Soviet Union would over time adopt Western liberal values.

Fierlinger tended to portray the policies of Joseph Stalin as a reaction against his enemies and essentially took Stalin's claims of a vast conspiracy against the Soviet Union at face value. In a sign of Beneš's favour, Fierlinger was allowed to criticise domestic policies in Czechoslovakia, as he drew an unfavourable contrast between the lives of the unemployed in Czechoslovakia, as opposed to the Soviet Union, which he maintained had no unemployment.

In 1935, Masaryk retired as president, and Beneš, who had long been his heir apparent, was elected as the new president. The new president kept a tight control over foreign policy and wanted men who were personally loyal to himself to conduct Czechoslovak foreign policy.

Despite their disagreements, Fierlinger was one of Beneš's favourites. Fierlinger, in turn, was a warm supporter of the treaty of alliance that Beneš signed in 1935 with the Soviet Union. In 1936, Beneš appointed Fierlinger as the political director at the foreign ministry. Fierlinger supported the Republican side in the Spanish Civil War. In 1937, he learned that a large shipment of arms from Czechoslovakia that was going to Lisbon supposedly for the Portuguese Army was in fact intended for the Spanish Nationalists, with Lisbon merely being a trans-shipment point to maintain the pretense of abiding by the arms embargo on both sides in Spain.

Fierlinger lacked the legal authority, but he ordered the arms to be seized by the Czechoslovak police as a violation of the arms embargo. The Portuguese government was embarrassed to be caught violating the arms embargo and so Portugal broke off diplomatic relations with Czechoslovakia over the arms seizure. Fierlinger's actions made him the object of much controversy, with many criticising him for exceeding his authority and for costing Czechoslovak arms industry a contract to supply arms.

== Ambassador to Soviet Union ==
Between 1937 and 1939 and again between 1941 and 1945, Fierlinger held the post of envoy (and later ambassador) to the Soviet Union. Fierlinger arrived in Moscow on 5 October 1937 as the Czechoslovak minister-plenipotentiary. The diplomat to whom Fierlinger was closest during his time in Moscow was Joseph E. Davies, the American ambassador, who shared his pro-Soviet sentiments. Predictably enough, the diplomat to whom Fierlinger was most hostile was Count Friedrich von der Schulenburg, the German ambassador in Moscow, whom he made no secret of disliking. Fierlinger reported to Prague that Davies had told him that he felt that the two best world leaders were President Franklin D. Roosevelt of the United States and President Edvard Beneš of Czechoslovakia and described both leaders as progressive liberals whom he greatly admired.

Within the diplomatic community in Moscow, there was much discussion of the effects of the Yezhovshchina ("Yezhov Times") on the Red Army. Both Schulenburg and the British ambassador, Lord Chilston, felt after the mass executions of much of the Red Army's senior command in June 1937, the Soviet military was finished as an effective fighting force. By contrast, both Davies and Fierlinger maintained an optimistic view and argued that the mass executions did not have the sort of negative impact that both the Germans and the British attributed. Fierlinger always believed that the Yezhovshchina was a defensive reaction imposed on Stalin because of real, as opposed to imaginary, threats to his rule and that after the Yezhovshchina ended, the Soviet Union would resume its path of "convergence" and ultimately become a democracy.

On 6 February 1938, Soviet-Romanian relations were badly strained by the defection of Fedor Butenko, the Soviet chargé d'affairs at the legation in Bucharest, who fled to Italy. There, he announced in a press conference in Rome hosted by the Italian government a few days later that he had abandoned communism to become a fascist instead.

The Soviet regime persistently accused the Romanian government of being behind the defection of Butenko or, alternatively, that he had been murdered in Bucharest and the man in Italy claiming to be Butenko was an imposter. As Czechoslovakia was allied to both Romania and the Soviet Union, that placed Beneš in a quandary, leading him to order Fierlinger to try to mediate the dispute. He said that the Romanians were gravely upset at the allegation that they had murdered Butenko. Fierlinger's efforts were described as "lukewarm" and the Butenko affair did much damage to Soviet-Romanian relations, which were never good even in the best of times, just as the Sudetenland crisis began to pose the question of Romania granting the Soviet Union transit rights to defend Czechoslovakia.

In February and March 1938, Fierlinger attended the third great show trial in Moscow, where the last of the Old Bolsheviks were tried and convicted. The leading defendant was Nikolai Bukharin, the leader of the "right" (moderate) wing of the Soviet Communist Party who had once been seen as a possible successor to Lenin, and as such, the trial of the "Anti-Soviet Bloc of Rightists and Trotskyists" is often known as the Bukharin Trial. Through many even, at the time, found the charges absurd, Fierlinger was convinced of the guilt of the 20 accused. In a dispatch to Prague, he wrote that the confessions made by all of the accused had "an immensely powerful impression as a captivating, exhausting and historically accurate description of the conspiracy and its contacts in Germany, Poland and Japan, culminating in the coup d'etat prepared for May 1937". Fierlinger described the trial as a "great moral victory" for Stalin and stated that he believed that none of the defendants had been tortured. About the confessions delivered in a flat monotone, Fierlinger wrote that the confessions gave "a completely persuasive picture of the oppositions' terrorists activities". Fierlinger attached much importance to the reference in the trial to the Heimfront of Konrad Henlein, which described as "an agency of German fascism" as evidence that the Soviet Union was concerned about Czechoslovakia. He wrote with an apparent disregard for his conclusions that the confession were genuine that the reference to Henlein was "put in the script" to prepare the peoples of the Soviet Union for a possible war in Central Europe. The Bukharin trial ended with all 20 of the accused being convicted and 18, including Bukharin, being executed.

Fierlinger was highly supportive of the alliance signed between the Soviet Union and Czechoslovakia in 1935 under which the Soviet Union was obliged to declare war on Germany if Germany invaded Czechoslovakia, and France did so first. On 23 April 1938, as the Sudetenland crisis began, Fierlinger in a report to Prague stated that Czechoslovakia was the subject of a meeting at the Kremlin attended by Sergei Aleksandrovsy, the Soviet minister-plenipotentiary in Prague; Maxim Litvinov, the foreign commissar; Vyacheslav Molotov, the premier; Lazar Kaganovich, the commissar for heavy industry and one of Stalin's closest associates; Marshal Kliment "Klim" Voroshilov, the commissar of war; and Joseph Stalin himself. Fierlingner happily reported to Prague that he had heard from sources, which he considered reliable, that the result of the meeting that it was decided that the Soviet Union would honour its alliance with Czechoslovakia if Germany should invade and France honoured its alliance with Czechoslovakia by declaring war on the Reich. Fierlinger stated Marshal Voroshilov was especially in favour of war with Germany if Czechoslovakia was attacked and stated it was his opinion, as a soldier, that the Red Army could reach Czechoslovakia in time to stop the Wehrmacht in the Sudetenland. Four days after sending his report, Fierlinger sent another report stating that Vladimir Potemkin, the deputy foreign commissar, had confirmed the contents of the meeting to him and affirmed that the Soviets would stand by their alliance with Czechoslovakia. Fierlinger also spoke with Colonel Roy C. Firebrace, the British military attaché in Moscow, who told him that he had just spoken with Schulenburg, who told him that he believed that the Soviet Union would do nothing if Germany invaded Czechoslovakia, which led to a spirited disagreement.

Throughout the Sudetenland crisis, Fierlinger had a blind faith that the Soviet Union would come to the aid of Czechoslovakia even without France. That made him strongly opposed to Beneš agreeing to concessions to Germany under heavy Anglo-French pressure. Fierlinger told a skeptical Lord Chilston of the value of the Soviet commitment to Czechoslovakia, which led Chilston to ask in what form and way would the Soviet Union assist Czechoslovakia beyond promises of support.

A major problem for Czechoslovakia was, if the crisis came to war, the expected defensive stance to be adopted by the French Army, which was expected to remain behind the Maginot Line and not to attempt to breach the Siegfried Line, which would allow Germany to throw the full might of the Wehrmacht against Czechoslovakia. For that reason, it was crucial for the Red Army to reach Czechoslovakia, but in turn, the Soviet Union lacked a common frontier with Czechoslovakia and so either Poland or Romania would have to grant the Red Army transit rights. It was felt that there was no possibility of Poland granting transit rights to the Red Army, Polish Foreign Minister Colonel Józef Beck stated that his government would never under any conditions grant transit rights to the Red Army. In 1937, King Carol II of Romania had indicated that the Soviets could use Romanian airspace to fly troops to Czechoslovakia in the event of war, which provided a glimmer of hope that the Romania might grant the transit rights. Fierlinger worked closely with the French ambassador in Moscow, Robert Coulondre, to work out a deal in which the Soviets would recognize Bessarabia as part of Romania in exchange for Romania giving the Soviets transit rights to Czechoslovakia. In June 1938, Fierlinger and Coulondre met with Litvinov to tell him that with Europe on the brink of war, it was time for the Soviet Union to set aside its claim to Bessarabia, or there would be no possibility of King Carol II granting the Red Army transit rights. Both Fierlinger and Coulondre urged Litvinov to make a sacrifice for the sake of peace and said that giving up the claim to Bessarabia could potentially save the lives of millions. Litvinov, in turn, responded by saying that the Soviet Union was willing to sign a defensive alliance with Romania and promised to keep its troops on the eastern side of the Dniester River upon the end of a possible war in exchange for transit rights, but it was unwilling to give up the claim to Bessarabia. King Carol and Romanian elites in general had a deep distrust and fear of the Soviet Union and expressed much apprehension that if the Red Army entered Romania, it would never leave. In August 1938, Fierlinger was accused of passing on secret documents to the Soviets, which led to the Foreign Ministry to take the "necessary precautionary steps", as an investigation was launched into those allegations.

In late August 1938, Fierlinger met with Beneš at his estate in the countryside at Sezimovo Ústí. Fierlinger maintained an optimistic picture and said he was convinced that Soviet Union would honour its alliance if France declared war, but he was unable to definitely state that the Soviet Union would declare war if France did not. Fierlnger found Beneš to be deeply depressed by the crisis. Beneš stated he was gravely disappointed by the attitude of the French, who he felt should have been supportive of their ally Czechoslovakia, and was disturbed by the attitude of the British, who, despite their claims to be even-handed and neutral, were blaming Czechoslovakia for the crisis, rather than Germany. To cheer Beneš up, Fierlinger played on his gramphone a record of Red Army marching songs that he had brought back from Moscow.

As the League of Nations opened its fall session in September 1938, Litvinov arrived in Geneva to take personal charge of the Soviet delegation at the League. In his speeches before the League Assembly, Litvinov urged that all member states of the League rally to the cause of Czechoslovakia under the banner of collective security. Fierlinger supported the Soviet approach of involving the League as a forum for resolving the crisis, an approach that was opposed by the governments of France and the United Kingdom, which wanted to keep the League out of the crisis. Coulondre told Fierlinger that it was the position of his government that the Soviets were trying to use the complexities of the League's collective security provisions as an excuse to avoid coming to the aid of Czechoslovakia and so France wanted to keep the League out of the crisis.

To resolve the crisis, British Prime Minister Neville Chamberlain visited Germany to meet Adolf Hitler at Berchtesgaden on 15 September 1938. At the summit, it was agreed that the Sudetenland would "go home to the Reich", as Hitler had been demanding ever since the Nazi Party Congress at Nuremberg on 12 September 1938. Under very strong Anglo-French pressure, Beneš agreed to the terms of the Berchtesgaden summit on 19 September 1938. Fierlinger met with Potemkin to tell him that Beneš had accepted the terms of the Berchtesgaden summit, which included abrogating the alliance with the Soviet Union. That led Potemkin to ask why Czechoslovakia had not tried to invoke the alliance first. Fierlinger replied that Beneš had not tried to invoke the alliance because of the problems posed by the refusal of the Polish and the Romanian governments to grant transit rights to the Red Army. The American historian Hugh Ragsdale wrote, "Both the question and answer are strange, as it is obvious that, in accepting the Anglo-French terms, the Czechoslovak government had consented to the abrogation of its mutual assistance pact with Moscow". In his speeches to the League Assembly, Litvinov stressed that his government still considered itself bound by the terms of the alliance and would still come to the aid of Czechoslovakia. The way that Litvinov declared that his government would still honour the alliance that Beneš had just abrogated greatly moved Fierlinger.

On 24 September 1938, Chamberlain flew to Germany to meet Hitler again at Bad Godesberg to tell him that the terms set out in the Berchtesgaden summit had been agreed to by the governments of both France and Czechoslovakia, only for Hitler to reject those terms as insufficient. After the rejection of Hitler's terms put forward at Bad Godesberg, Europe was on the brink of war. The Munich Conference of 30 September 1938 put an end to the crisis. On the afternoon of the same day, Coulondre visited Fierlinger to offer him his sympathy and reported, "When I entered his study, I felt there is the coldness which penetrates one in a house where there is a dead person". Coulondre reported that Fierlinger was furious with the "betrayal" of the Munich Agreement and that he lashed out at both France and Britain, who he accused of sacrificing Czechoslovakia to avoid the war with Germany that he predicted was inevitable.

Contrary to expectations, Fierlinger did not resign as minister-plenipotentiary when Beneš resigned as president and was succeeded by Emil Hácha. In January 1939, Fierlinger visited Prague to meet Hácha, whom he felt comfortable in serving although Hácha's foreign policy was the complete opposite of Beneš's.

On 15 March 1939, Germany occupied the Czech half of Czecho-Slovakia, which now became the Reich Protectorate of Bohemia-Moravia, and Baron Konstantin von Neurath was appointed as the Reich Protector to "supervise" Hácha. With the end of independence, the Czechoslovak Legation in Moscow was closed, as Schulenburg arrived at the legation to demand that Fierlinger hand over the keys and said that the German embassy from now on would handle relations with the Soviet Union on behalf of the protectorate. However, the Soviet Union at first did not accept the proclamation of the Reich Protectorate, and the legation continued ambiguously in a state of legal limbo.

In April–May 1939, Fierlinger took an extended vacation and met Czechoslovak leaders in exile in London and Paris but not Beneš, who was working as a professor at the University of Chicago. In late June 1939, Fierlinger returned to Moscow to take charge, but it was understood he was representing the government-in-exile, headed by Beneš. However, Litvinov had been replaced as foreign commissar by Molotov, who had no time for Fierlinger. On 26 August 1939, Fierlinger in a letter to Beneš admitted that he was shocked by the German-Soviet Non-aggression Pact. However, Fierlinger blamed it on France and especially Britain, which he accused of negotiating the Soviets' proposed inclusion in the "peace front", meant to deter Germany from invading Poland, in a lackluster and ineffective way. He wrote, "I admit that they are playing for high stakes, but I think vacillation in the West was the only reason for the sensational turnaround in Soviet policy".

== World War II ==
On 14 December 1939, Fierlinger was asked to leave Moscow, as the legation was finally closed, and on Christmas Day, he arrived in Paris. In Paris, he sought out Jan Šrámek, offered to work as an unofficial diplomat to maintain contacts with the Soviet Union and said that he did not expect the current alignment in Soviet foreign policy to last. In a memo that he wrote to Beneš on 20 April 1940, Fierlinger argued that such steps such as the closing of the Czechoslovak Legation in Moscow and Soviet recognition of Slovakia were insubstantial, as he still believed that Soviet foreign policy was anti-German and that the pact was merely a transitional measure.

However, with the Soviet Union more or less allied to Germany, Fierlinger's pro-Soviet views put him on the margins of Czechoslovak émigré politics. In a memo that he wrote sometime in 1940 "The Present War as a Social Crisis", Fierlinger argued that the present war was a "people's war" and noted that in Britain, many people were demanding social and economic reforms to create a better world after the war. He noted that a return to the world of the 1930s was repulsive to most British people.

Fierlinger noted that a return to the Great Depression was not an attractive proposition to most British people and so there was the demand for social and economic reforms to prevent that possibility. He predicated that Britain was moving towards socialism and that after the war, capitalism would be replaced with some sort of socialism. In a broader sense, Fierlinger argued that "economic liberalism" was doomed, and he expected socialism to be the wave of the future.

During that period, Fierlinger kept in close contact with Ivan Maisky, the Soviet ambassador to the Court of St. James'. Fierlinger shared intelligence with Maisky that had been collected by the Czechoslovak intelligence service, including information that Germany planned to invade the Soviet Union on 22 June 1941 in an operation that was codenamed Barbarossa.

The Soviets paid little attention to Fierligner's warnings about Operation Barbarossa before its launch, but as danger of German invasion rose, they became more interested in Czechoslovak intelligence operations. After several trial meetings in 1940, the cooperation between Soviet and Czechoslovak intelligence was established in January 1941 and since April there was a Czechoslovak Military Mission in the USSR.

In August 1941, Fierlinger returned to Moscow to serve once again as the Czechoslovak minister-plenipotentiary, this time representing of the Czechoslovak government-in-exile. In a sign of improved relations in 1942, relations were upgraded from legation to embassy level and so Fierlinger was promoted to the rank of ambassador.

Fierlinger joined the Soviet campaign for a "Second Front". He accepted the Soviet claim that the British and, from late 1941, the Americans were deliberately fighting in peripherical theatres such as North Africa and that they were refusing to invade north-western Europe as a part of strategy to "fight until the last Russian". He felt that the Soviets carried the heaviest burden, as the Red Army faced three Wehrmacht Army Groups, totalling some 3 million men; both the Americans and the British were insufficiently appreciative of Soviet sacrifices; and both countries could do more far. At the same time, Fierlinger was never critical of the Soviet Union, whose war efforts he depicted in the most glowing of terms.

Fierlinger started to become quietly critical of Beneš, who he felt was trying too hard to establish continuities between the First Republic and the anticipated Third Republic, which would be established after the war. In a 1943 essay, Fierlinger wrote that the diplomacy to establish a new international order in 1918-1919 was too influenced by the fear of the Russian Revolution and that only "Lenin's genius could grasp and explain the meaning of historical developments in the new era".

Fierlinger very strongly opposed to Beneš's plans for a Polish-Czechoslovak federation after the war, which he viewed as a British scheme to keep the Soviets out of Central Europe. Fierlinger very strongly advised Beneš to drop the plans for federation and instead to make an alliance with the Soviet Union the basis of post-war Czechoslovak foreign policy.

Fierlinger always regarded himself as the "father" of the Soviet-Czechoslovak alliance, which was negotiated during the summer and fall of 1943. During his period in Moscow, Fierlinger was very close to the leadership of the Czechoslovak Communist Party, led by Klement Gottwald. That is evident, for example, in 1943, when the Communists, in conjunction with Fierlinger, facilitated the signing of the Soviet-Czech alliance treaty in Moscow on 12 December 1943 by Joseph Stalin and Edvard Beneš. The decision by Beneš to sign the alliance took place over the opposition of both British Prime Minister Winston Churchill and Foreign Secretary Anthony Eden, both of whom felt that the alliance would give the Soviet Union too great a role in the post-war affairs of Eastern Europe. In 1943, it was not clear that the Red Army would reach Eastern Europe first, and Churchill, in particular, held to hopes that the Italian theatre would allow the British Army to use Italy as a base for do so first.

From late 1943, Beneš's relations with Fierlinger became increasingly strained as the president began to feel that Fierlinger was more concerned with representing Soviet interests than Czechoslovak interests. In an unauthorised act, Fierlinger sent out a public telegram to Edward Osóbka-Morawski that celebrated the entry of the Polish People's Army to Polish soil, which led Beneš to rebuke Fierlinger for an act that implied support for the Lublin government, a Soviet puppet.

Jan Masaryk, the foreign minister of the government-in-exile and the son of the former president, wanted to sack Fierlinger for that letter and complained that he was no longer representing Czechoslovakia in Moscow in any meaningful sense of the term. Fierlinger sent out a long letter to Beneš to justify his act and suggested for the Czechoslovak government-in-exile to break off relations with the Polish government-in-exile and to recognise the Lublin government.

On 28 July 1944, the entire Czechoslovak cabinet recommended to Beneš to sack Fierlinger as ambassador in Moscow and to appoint a new ambassador, who would represent the interests of the government-in-exile, instead of the Soviet Union, but Beneš refused to accept.

Beneš no longer trusted Fierlinger, he felt that the ambassador was close to Stalin, who would thus see it as an insult if Fierlinger was fired. Thar was especially the case as it clear by the mid-1944 that the Red Army would reach Eastern Europe first, instead of the Western armies.

In November 1944, Fierlinger, in a letter to Gottwald, stated that he wanted to see all assets owned by collaborators seized without compensation, the Czechoslovak state to nationalise all banks and other financial institutions and the Soviet Union to become Czechoslovakia's main trading partner. By then, Fierlinger had decided that he wanted to become prime minister and was seeking the support of Gottwald for the office.

In March 1945, during a visit to Tehran, Fierlinger told Beneš that he wanted to become prime minister, which led the president to say that he was unqualified for such a post. The meeting ended on a confrontational note, as Fierlinger became quite angry when Beneš told him that he was unsuitable to be prime minister.

Masaryk by then had developed a very strong dislike of Fierlinger, and was still advising Beneš to sack him as ambassador in Moscow.

== Third Republic ==
Just before the end of World War II in Europe, he in April 1945 became prime minister of the Czechoslovak government-in-exile and retained that post after the country was liberated later that year. On 10 May, Fierlinger flew into Prague aboard a Soviet plane. Fierlinger took part in the victory parade in Prague and rode in the car in front of Beneš, who received the loudest cheers from the city's people. Beneš had lowered his opinion of Fierlinger and told US Ambassador Laurence Steinhardt that he was "superficial, unreliable, tricky and ignorant". Zeman and Karlsch wrote, "He manipulated Beneš's disillusion with the West after Munich-he was Beneš's bad conscience".

Immediately after the dropping of atomic bombs on the Japanese city of Hiroshima on 6 August 1945, followed by Nagasaki on 9 August, a delegation of Soviet geologists and Red Army officers started to take an immense interest in the uranium mine at Jáchymov, in the Sudetenland. In response to complaints that the Soviets had taken virtual control of the mine in September, Fierlinger advised the local authorities to "do nothing".

Without initially informing the minister of industry, Bohumil Laušman, Fierlinger opened up secret talks for Czechoslovakia to supply uranium, which the Soviet Union lacked, for the Soviet nuclear program. On 12 September, Fierlinger handed Valerian Zorin, the Soviet ambassador in Prague, a draft treaty for Czechoslovakia to supply uranium at a fixed annual rate. On 26 September at a meeting at Prague, Fierlinger met with a Soviet delegation, led by Colonel S.P. Alexandrov of the Soviet General Staff, and Ivan Bakulin, of the ministry of foreign trade. Also attending the meeting were Laušman, the minister of industry; Václav Nosek, the minister of the interior; General Ludvík Svoboda, the minister of defense; and General Bohumil Boček, the chief of the Czechoslovak general staff. Fierlinger was told that the Czechoslovak draft was unacceptable, as it allowed the Czechoslovak government to retain control of the Jáchymov uranium mine, which the Soviets wanted to be controlled by a joint stock company, which would be owned equally by the Soviet and Czechoslovak governments. Fierlinger stated that he preferred technical co-operation to co-ownership.

Because the Jáchymov uranium mine had been owned by the German government, which had used the uranium for its atomic bomb program during the war, the Soviets regarded all of the uranium from the mine as war reparations. Fierlinger agreed to accept the Soviet draft treaty as the basis of the talks. At the end of the meeting, Alexandrov stated, "It was not the Soviet Union who declared the atom bomb the weapon of the future". That led Fierlinger to reply, "Now we know where we stand".

On 6 October 1945, Fierlinger met with Bakulin, who told him that the Soviet Union wanted to be the exclusive customer for the uranium from Jáchymov, but it was prepared to be more flexible about the ownership. The next day, Fierlinger met with Beneš at his villa at Sezimovo Ústí to discuss the treaty. Beneš objected to the demand that Czechoslovakia sell uranium only to the Soviet Union, but he was told by Fierlinger that signing the treaty was the precondition for Soviet support for Czechoslovak territorial claims against Poland.

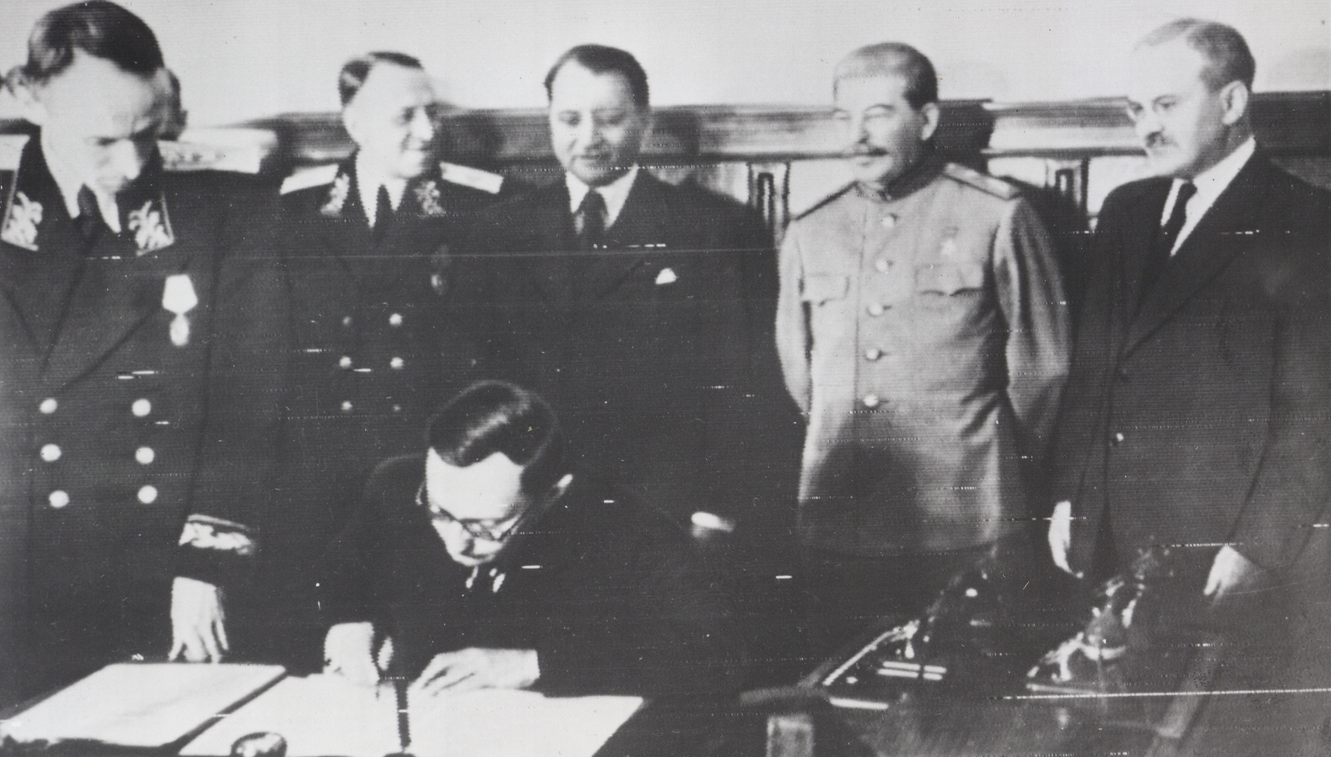
Zdenek Fierlinger signing a treaty on Carpathian Ukraine with the soviets

At the same time, Bakulin informed Fierlinger that he had already promised to ship 38,516 kg of radioactive material to the Soviet Union. On 14 October, 37,012 kg of uranium paints were shipped to the Soviet Union, and on 29 October, 9,725 kg of uranium concentrate were loaded onto a train there.

In response to a message from Molotov, Fierlinger indicated his willingness to have the Soviet Union be the exclusive buyer of the uranium, but he was opposed to the joint stock company, and the Jáchymov mine must be under sole Czechoslovak control. On 14 November, Bakulin submitted a new draft treaty to Fierlinger, which dropped the demand for a joint stock company but provided for a state-owned Czechoslovak company, whose management would consist of a joint board of four member (two Czechoslovak and two Soviet) to run the Jáchymov mine. On 17 November, Fierlinger spoke at the presidum, consisting of the prime minister and the five deputies representing the five major parties about the treaty, and general approval was expressed.

On 21 November 1945, Bakulin told Fierlinger that the Soviets were willing to accept the treaty if 90% of the uranium went to the Soviet Union, and the Czechoslovaks could keep the remaining 10%. On 23 November, Fierlinger first informed the full cabinet about the treaty, which he argued "makes no demands on the financial resources of the state, on the contrary, it means financial gain". Later that day, Fierlinger signed an agreement with the Soviet Union for Czechoslovakia to supply uranium from the mines at Jáchymov for the Soviet atomic bomb program.

He remained prime minister until the 1946 elections, when the largest share of the votes was won by the Czechoslovak Communists. He became a leading figure in the "left-wing" social democracy movement, which sought the closest possible ties with the Czechoslovak Communist Party under Klement Gottwald, who became the new premier. The American historians Joseph Rothschild and Nancy Wingfield described Fierlinger as "a reflective enthusiast for zombie-like coordination with the Communists and the Soviet Union".

== Communist Czechoslovakia ==
Between 1946 and 1948, Fierlinger was chairman of the Czech Social Democratic Party. In November 1947, the Social Democrats ousted him as their leader, claiming that he was too submissive to the Communists.

After the communist coup in February 1948, Fierlinger acted as the chief proponent of the "unification" of the Social Democrats and the Communists. Under the terms of the merger later that year, he became a member of the KSČ Central Committee. According to the American journalist John Gunther, Fierlinger was subsequently nicknamed "Dr. Quislingerer".

He subsequently served as Deputy Prime Minister from 1948 to 1953, Minister of the State Office for religious affairs from 1951 to 1953, Chairman of the National Assembly from 15 October 1953 to 23 June 1964 and Minister in charge of the State. He remained a member of the Central Committee until 1966.

During the Prague Spring of 1968, the Soviet embassy in Prague viewed Fierlinger in hostile terms as a "right-wing" force within the KSČ (a supporter of the Prague Spring). In its reports to Moscow, he was described by Soviet diplomats as someone who supported the liberalising reforms of Alexander Dubček intended to achieve "socialism with a human face". In 1968, among other things, one of his last public acts was to lead a delegation in protest outside the Soviet embassy against the Soviet invasion of Czechoslovakia.

== Sources ==
=== Books ===
- Adamthwaite, Anthony (1977). France and the Coming of the Second World War, 1936-1939. London: Taylor & Francis. ISBN 978-100035278-8.
- Ference, Geoffrey (2020). "Zdeněk Fierlinger". In Tucker, Stephen (ed.). The Cold War: The Definitive Encyclopedia and Document Collection. Santa Barbara: ABC-CLIO. p. 539. ISBN 978-144086076-8.
- Ford, Franklin; Schorske, Carl (1953). "The Voice in the Wilderness Robert Coulondre". In Craig, Gordon A.; Gilbert, Felix (eds.). The Diplomats 1919-1939. Princeton University Press. pp. 555–578 – via Internet Archive.
- Gunther, John (1961). Inside Europe Today. New York: Harper & Brothers. p. 334. LCCN 61-9706 – via Internet Archive.
- Lukes, Igor (1996). Czechoslovakia Between Stalin and Hitler The Diplomacy of Edvard Beneš in the 1930s. Oxford University Press. ISBN 978-019510266-6.
- Lukes, Igor (2012). On the Edge of the Cold War American Diplomats and Spies in Postwar Prague. Oxford University Press. ISBN 978-019972174-0.
- Pavlenko, Oleg (2019). "The Events in Czechoslovakia and the Soviet Embassy in Prague, 1967-1968". In Pazderka, Josef (ed.). The Soviet Invasion of Czechoslovakia in 1968 The Russian Perspective. Lanham: Lexington Books. pp. 81–124. ISBN 978-179360293-0.
- Ragsdale, Hugh (2004). The Soviets, the Munich Crisis, and the Coming of World War II. Cambridge University Press. ISBN 978-113945025-6.
- Rothschild, Joseph; Wingfield, Nancy (1999). Return to Diversity A Political History of East Central Europe Since World War II. Oxford University Press. ISBN 978-019511992-3.
- Zeman, Zbyněk; Karlsch, Rainer (2008). Uranium Matters: Central European Uranium in International Politics, 1900-1960. Budapest: Central European University Press. ISBN 978-963977600-5.

=== Other sources ===
- Marcovitz, Hal (2 November 1998). "Freedom Animated Montco Filmmaker". The Morning Call. Archived from the original on 13 March 2014.
