= 1948 Czechoslovak coup d'état =

Soviet-backed coup

- Part of the Cold War
Date	21–25 February 1948
Location	Czechoslovakia
Result	Coup successful; Appointment of a communist-dominated government

Belligerents
President National Socialist Party (Note: Founded as the Czech National Social Party in 1897, the party's name was changed to the Czechoslovak National Socialist Party in 1926.); People's Party; Democratic Party; Social Democracy (anti-communist factions)	Prime Minister Communist Party; Social Democracy (pro-communist factions); Supported by: Soviet Union

Commanders and leaders
Edvard Beneš (surrendered); Petr Zenkl; Jan Šrámek; Jozef Lettrich; Bohumil Laušman (surrendered)	Klement Gottwald; Rudolf Slánský; Václav Nosek; Václav Kopecký; Zdeněk Fierlinger

In late February 1948, the Communist Party of Czechoslovakia (KSČ), with Soviet backing, assumed undisputed control over the government of Czechoslovakia through a coup d'état. It marked the beginning of four decades of the party's rule in the country. (Note: In English, the coup is often called the Czech coup or Prague coup; In Czech and Slovak, the coup was known as "Victorious February" (Czech: Vítězný únor, Slovak: Víťazný február) for most of the Communist era.)

The KSČ enjoyed a period of popularity following the reestablishment of pre-war Czechoslovakia. After a successful performance during the 1946 parliamentary election, party leader Klement Gottwald became prime minister of a coalition government at the behest of President Edvard Beneš. By summer 1947, however, the KSČ's popularity had significantly dwindled, and the party was expected to be soundly defeated in the May 1948 elections. This, along with the electoral failures of the French and Italian communist parties, prompted Joseph Stalin to harden his approach and order Gottwald to seize power.

On 21 February 1948, twelve non-Communist ministers resigned in protest. They objected to Gottwald's refusal to stop packing the police with Communists, and believed that Gottwald would give way. Instead, he threatened a general strike unless Beneš appointed a Communist-dominated government. Armed Communist militia and police took over Prague and mass demonstrations were mounted. On 25 February, Beneš, fearing civil war and Soviet intervention, capitulated and allowed the formation of a new government in accordance with KSČ demands. While it was still ostensibly a coalition, it was dominated by Communists and fellow travellers. The Communists quickly consolidated their power following the coup. The National Assembly approved a new constitution on 9 May, declaring Czechoslovakia a "people's democratic state". The 30 May elections, in which voters were presented with a single list of candidates, cemented the Communist takeover. Beneš resigned on 2 June and was succeeded by Gottwald as president.

The coup's significance extended well beyond the state's boundaries as it was a clear marker along the already well-advanced road to full-fledged Cold War. The event alarmed Western countries and helped spur quick adoption of the Marshall Plan, the creation of a state in West Germany, paramilitary measures to keep communists out of power in France, Greece and especially Italy, and steps toward mutual security that would result in the establishment of NATO just over a year later and the definitive drawing of the Iron Curtain until the Revolutions of 1989.

== Background ==
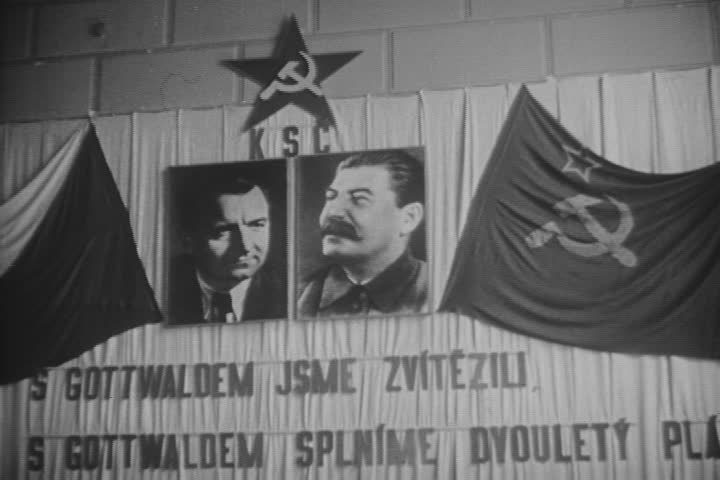
Portraits of Klement Gottwald and Joseph Stalin at a 1947 meeting of the Communist Party of Czechoslovakia. The slogan reads: "With Gottwald we won, with Gottwald we shall complete the Two-Year Plan"

In the aftermath of World War II, the Communist Party of Czechoslovakia (KSČ) was in a favorable position. Its powerful influence on Czechoslovak politics since the 1920s, its clean wartime record and cooperation with non-Communist parties, its identification with the Soviet Union, one of the country's liberators, and its determination to become the country's leading political force without alarming the West (a strategy also followed by Communist parties in Italy and in France) dovetailed with popular opposition to Nazi rule, the longing for real change that followed it, and the new political realities of living within the Soviet orbit to produce a surge in membership from 40,000 in 1945 to 1.35 million in 1948. Moreover, the Soviets viewed the country as a strategic prize: it bordered West Germany and boasted uranium deposits around Jáchymov.

Nonetheless, party leader Klement Gottwald said in 1945 that "in spite of the favourable situation, the next goal is not soviets and socialism, but rather carrying out a really thorough democratic national revolution", thereby linking his party to the Czechoslovak democratic tradition (he even claimed to be a disciple of Tomáš Masaryk) and to Czech nationalism by capitalizing on popular intense anti-German feelings. During the early postwar period, working with the other parties in a coalition called the National Front, the Communists kept up the appearance of being willing to work within the system.

Thus, in the 1946 election, the KSČ and KSS won 38% of the vote. This was the best-ever performance by a European Communist party in a free election, and was far more than the 22% won by their Hungarian counterparts the following year in the only other free and fair postwar election in the Soviet area of influence. President Edvard Beneš, not himself a Communist but very amenable to cooperation with the Soviets, and who hoped for restraint by the Allied powers, thus invited Gottwald to be prime minister. Although the government still had a non-Communist majority (nine Communists and seventeen non-Communists), the KSČ had initial control over the police and armed forces, and came to dominate other key ministries such as those dealing with propaganda, education, social welfare and agriculture; they also soon dominated the civil service.

However, by the summer of 1947 the KSČ had alienated whole blocs of potential voters. The activities of the police—headed by Interior Minister Václav Nosek, a Communist—were acutely offensive to many citizens; farmers objected to talk of collectivization, and some workers were angry at Communist demands that they increase output without being given higher wages. The general expectation was that the Communists would be soundly defeated in the May 1948 elections. That September, at the first Cominform meeting, Andrei Zhdanov observed that Soviet victory had helped achieve "the complete victory of the working class over the bourgeoisie in every East European land except Czechoslovakia, where the power contest still remains undecided." This clearly implied the KSČ should be accelerating its own efforts to take complete power. That notion would be reinforced during the Prague Spring, when party archives were opened and showed that Stalin gave up the whole idea of a parliamentary path for Czechoslovakia when the Communist parties of France and Italy failed to achieve power in 1947 and 1948.

The KSČ's number-two leader, general secretary Rudolf Slánský, represented the KSČ at the meeting. He returned to Prague with a plan for the final seizure of power. Slánský remarked, "as in the international field, we have gone on the offensive on the domestic front as well." The KSČ pursued a two-pronged strategy. The party knew it had to maintain the façade of working within the electoral political system and was aware that a revolutionary coup would be unacceptable. It desired to gain an absolute majority at elections scheduled for 1948, but the fracturing of the left-wing coalition made this unrealistic. This pushed the party into extra-parliamentary action. The organization of "spontaneous" demonstrations to "express the will of the people" and continuous visits to parliament by workers' delegations were meant to ensure "mobilization of the masses".

== The coup ==
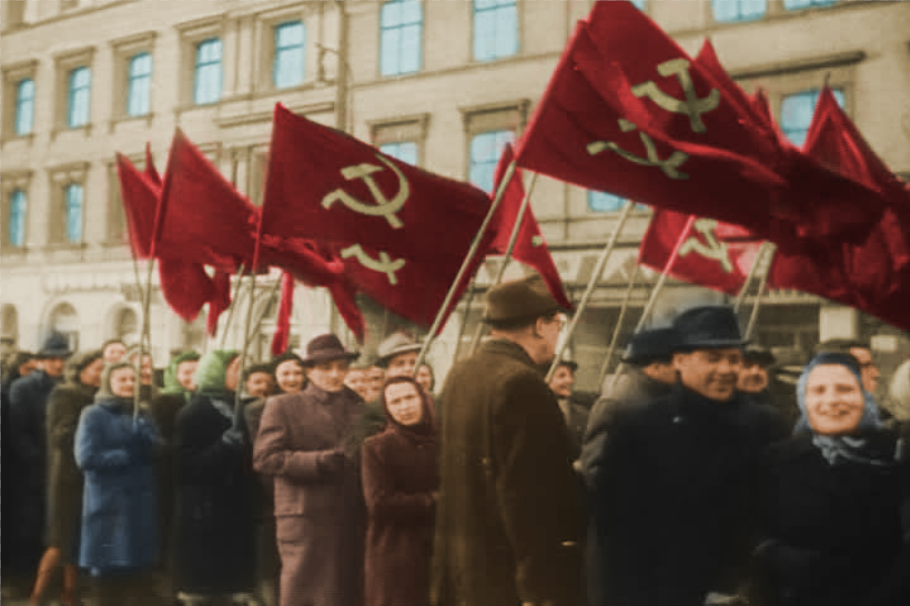
Pro-Communist demonstrations in Prague, 1947

During the winter of 1947–48, both in the cabinet and in parliament tension between the Communists and their opponents led to increasingly bitter conflict. Matters came to a head in February 1948, when Nosek illegally extended his powers by attempting to purge remaining non-Communist elements in the National Police Force. The security apparatus and police were being transformed into instruments of the KSČ, and consequently, according to John Grenville, endangering basic civic freedoms.

On 12 February, the non-Communists in the cabinet demanded punishment for the offending Communists in the government and an end to their supposed subversion. Nosek, backed by Gottwald, refused to yield. He and his fellow Communists threatened to use force and, in order to avoid defeat in parliament, mobilised groups of their supporters in the country. On 21 February, twelve non-Communist ministers resigned in protest after Nosek refused to reinstate eight non-Communist senior police officers despite a majority vote of the cabinet in favour of doing so. Most of the ministers remained at their posts, with Social Democratic leader Zdeněk Fierlinger making no secret of his support for the Communists.

The non-Communists assumed that Beneš would refuse to accept their resignations, keeping them in a caretaker government and in the process embarrassing the Communists enough to make them yield. Beneš initially insisted that no new government could be formed which did not include ministers from the non-Communist parties. However, an atmosphere of mounting tension, coupled with massive Communist-led demonstrations occurring throughout the country, convinced Beneš to remain neutral over the issue, for fear the KSČ foment an insurrection and give the Red Army a pretext to invade the country and restore order.

In Grenville's opinion, had Beneš held his line, the Communists would not have been able to form a government. The historian believed there could have been only two non-violent means of resolving the crisis—give way to the non-Communists or risk defeat in early elections which the KSČ would not have had time to rig. The non-Communists saw this as a moment of opportunity, needing to act quickly before the Communists had total control over the police and threatened the electoral process.

At the same time, the non-Communist ministers seemed to behave as if this was just an old-fashioned pre-1939 governmental crisis. They did not know that the Communists were mobilizing from below to take complete power. Soviet deputy foreign minister Valerian Zorin, who had been his country's ambassador to Czechoslovakia from 1945 to 1947, returned to Prague to help with the final arrangements for the coup. Armed militia and police took over Prague, Communist demonstrations were mounted and an anti-Communist student demonstration was broken up. The ministries of the non-Communist ministers were occupied, civil servants dismissed and the ministers prevented from entering their own ministries. The army, under the direction of Defence Minister Ludvík Svoboda, who was formally non-partisan but had facilitated Communist infiltration into the officer corps, was confined to barracks and did not interfere.

Communist "Action Committees" and trade union militias were quickly set up, armed, and sent into the streets, as well as being prepared to carry through a purge of anti-Communists. In a speech before 100,000 of these people, Gottwald threatened a general strike unless Beneš agreed to form a new Communist-dominated government. Zorin at one point offered the services of the Red Army, camped on the country's borders. However, Gottwald declined the offer, believing that the threat of violence combined with heavy political pressure would be enough to force Beneš to surrender. As he said after the coup, Beneš "knows what strength is, and this led him to evaluate this [situation] realistically". Additionally, according to historian Igor Lukes, Beneš had been in poor health since 1945, and by 1948 was "a shell of a man" who did not have the emotional or physical stamina to hold out against the "rough, rough players" of the KSČ.

On 25 February 1948, Beneš, fearful of civil war and Soviet intervention, capitulated. He accepted the resignations of the non-Communist ministers and appointed a new government in accordance with KSČ demands. Gottwald continued as prime minister of a new government comprising 25 members–13 Communists and 12 non-Communists (nine members from non-Communist parties and three independents). In truth, the new government was dominated by Communists and pro-Moscow Social Democrats. The Social Democrats' leader, Fierlinger, had been a proponent of closer ties with the Communists for some time; as mentioned above, he openly sided with the Communists during the dispute. Members of the People's, Czech National Social Party and Slovak Democratic parties still figured, so the government was still nominally a coalition. However, this was no longer a coalition in any real sense of the term. The other parties had been taken over by fellow travellers who were loyal partners of the Communists, and ministers using these labels were handpicked by the Communists. The only senior minister who was neither a Communist nor a fellow traveller was Foreign Minister Jan Masaryk, who was however found dead two weeks later outside a third-floor window. Some friends and admirers believed Masaryk committed suicide out of despair. However, there was longstanding Western suspicion was that he had actually been thrown to his death, which remains to this day, with an investigation closed in 2021 ruling murder, accident, or suicide all possible.

Following the coup, the Communists moved quickly to consolidate their power. Thousands were fired and hundreds were arrested. Thousands fled the country to avoid living under Communism. The National Assembly, freely elected two years earlier, quickly fell into line and gave Gottwald's revamped government a vote of confidence in March. The 230–0 result was unanimous, although nine MPs had resigned following the coup.

On 9 May, a new constitution was approved by parliament, which declared Czechoslovakia a "people's democratic state." Although it was not a completely Communist document (indeed, the KSČ was not even mentioned), it was close enough to the Soviet model that Beneš refused to sign it. At the 30 May elections, voters were presented with a single list from the National Front, which officially won 89.2% of the vote; within the National Front list, the Communists had an absolute majority of 214 seats (160 for the main party and 54 for the Slovak branch). This majority grew even larger when the Social Democrats merged with the Communists later in the year. Practically all non-Communist parties that had participated in the 1946 election were also represented within the National Front list and thus received parliamentary seats. However, by this time the few independent-minded members of those parties were either in prison or in exile. The remaining fellow travellers accepted the Communists' "leading role" as a condition of their parties' continued existence, rendering them almost completely subservient to the KSČ. The National Front was converted into a broad patriotic organisation dominated by the Communists, and no political group outside it was allowed to exist. Consumed by these events, Beneš resigned on 2 June and was succeeded by Gottwald twelve days later. Beneš died in September, bringing a symbolic close to the sequence of events, and was buried before an enormous and silent throng come to mourn the passing of a popular leader and of the democracy he had come to represent.

== Impact ==
Czechoslovakia was ruled by a victorious Communist Party of Czechoslovakia until the Velvet Revolution of 1989. More immediately, the coup became synonymous with the Cold War. The loss of the last remaining liberal democracy in Eastern Europe came as a profound shock to millions in the West. For the second time in a decade, Western eyes saw Czechoslovak independence and democracy snuffed out by a foreign totalitarian dictatorship intent on dominating the small country (though unlike in 1938–39, the KSČ did most of the "dirty work").

The USSR seemed to have completed the formation of a monolithic Soviet bloc and concluded the partition of Europe, which appeared to vindicate and certainly crystallized the pessimistic appraisals of Soviet power in the West by people who felt certain that it was folly to try to do business with the USSR. Because its impact was equally profound in Western Europe as in the United States, it helped unify Western countries against the Communist bloc. It gave an air of prescience to the French and Italian governments for having forced their local Communists out of their governments a year earlier.

Additionally, it finally discredited Soviet moves to prevent the formation of a West German state and accelerated the construction of a West European alliance, the Treaty of Brussels, the following month; mutual security was the new watchword. Until early 1948, Western and Soviet representatives had communicated in regular meetings at the foreign minister level; the Czechoslovak coup constituted a final rupture in relations between the two superpowers, with the West now signaling its determination to commit itself to collective self-defence. By early March, even a previously wavering France was demanding a concrete military alliance with definite promises to help in certain circumstances.

From the Soviet point of view, the coup could not have come at a worse time. The government crisis in Prague lasted from 20 to 27 February, just when Western foreign ministers were meeting in London. From the West's perspective, the coup was an example of Communism in its most unacceptable form; the USSR seemed to the West bent on ruthless expansion and the suppression of freedom.

During the Communist era in Czechoslovakia, the coup was branded as a socialist revolution carried out by the Czechoslovak people without Soviet influence. This line was codified by both Communist-era constitutions. The Ninth-of-May Constitution declared Czechoslovakia had embarked on a "national and democratic revolution" that it intended to defend against "domestic and foreign reaction," and hailed the coup as "the action we took in defense of the People's Democratic Order in February 1948." Along similar lines, its 1960 successor stated that the last obstacle to socialism had been removed by "the determined action of the working people in February 1948."

=== United States ===
The coup's impact in the United States was immediate. Opposition towards the Marshall Plan had developed in the United States Congress, but a shocked and aroused public opinion overwhelmed this, and Congress promptly approved over US$5 billion for the first year of the European Recovery Program.

Until the Czech coup, the emphasis in Washington had been on economic containment of Communism, primarily through the Truman Doctrine and the Marshall Plan and a heavy reliance on atomic power as a shield to support it. President Harry S. Truman understood that in 1946 and 1947 the American people were not prepared for a massive conventional arms buildup or a confrontation with the Soviet Union. He was reluctant to increase the military budget dramatically and instead chose a gradual and balanced buildup. Expecting to spend large amounts on the Marshall Plan, he sought to keep the annual defence budget below $15 billion.

However, the coup served to expose the limitations of U.S. conventional forces and its over-reliance on atomic power. At the time of the Prague crisis, roughly ten ill-equipped and poorly trained U.S. and West European divisions faced over thirty Soviet divisions. When taking into account Defense Department complaints that the U.S. atomic arsenal and the air power to use it were starkly inadequate, it became clear that the U.S. lacked a credible military deterrent in Europe.

The Czechoslovak coup changed the whole tone of the debate on the U.S. military budget. It helped spark a new round of Pentagon lobbying for a substantial rise in the military budget, while the NSC called for "a worldwide counter-offensive" against the Soviet bloc, including U.S. military aid to the Western European Union. Truman responded to the crisis with a grim nationwide radio address on 17 March calling for a renewal of selective service, which had been allowed to lapse the previous year. He also sought congressional approval for a programme of Universal Military Training (UMT). He aimed to send a signal of determination to the Soviet Union that U.S. military posture was strong and that the country with this expansion of military preparedness was also prepared in the future to rearm massively if necessary. Congress rejected UMT, but did vote to resume selective service, and voted the money for a seventy-group air force, 25% larger than the official request.

Nevertheless, the change in American foreign policy in response to the crisis-like atmosphere of early 1948 was more symbolic than real. American willingness to consult on new security arrangements for Europe was the product of neither a changed estimate of Soviet intentions nor a readiness to take on a larger share of the burden of defending Western Europe. Rather, it was a tactical maneuver intended to mitigate the effect of the coup in Czechoslovakia and the brief but intense war scare that followed.

As a result, a series of quick fixes followed to ensure that American forces would not be caught completely off guard in the event of war. More important was the sensitivity with which American officials now treated the nervousness of their European counterparts; the Americans now became more willing to take steps to boost morale in Europe and ease the now-widespread anxieties there. The coup and the Berlin Blockade that June made clear that constant reassurance was needed to bind the Europeans to the U.S. system; hence, the remobilization of U.S. armed forces began.

Indeed, the fear of war between the Soviets and the West reached a high point after the coup. On 5 March, General Lucius D. Clay sent an alarming telegram from Berlin that advised of its likelihood: "Within the last few weeks, I have felt a subtle change in Soviet attitude which I cannot define but which now gives me a feeling that it may come with dramatic suddenness". General Omar Bradley later wrote that when he read Clay's "lugubrious assessment" in Washington he was "lifted right out of [his] chair", and George F. Kennan wrote that the coup and the telegram had combined to create "a real war scare" where "the military and the intelligence fraternity" had "overreacted in the most deplorable way". Only a week later, the Joint Chiefs of Staff recommended rearmament and a restoration of the draft.

In fact, Clay's warning had more to do with a request by Army director of intelligence Lt. Gen. Stephen Chamberlain for material that would persuade Congress to spend more on military readiness than with any hard evidence of Soviet intent to launch a war in Europe. Still, in Europe too in February and March "war was being commonly, even calmly discussed in streets and cafes on the Continent", a fear exacerbated by reports on 27 February that Stalin had invited Finland to sign a treaty of mutual assistance, contributing to expectations it would be the next domino to fall; pressure for a treaty was placed on Norway too.

Amidst the general alarm, more sanguine voices were also raised. The Truman Administration had months earlier written off Czechoslovakia as little more than a Soviet satellite; in November 1947 U.S. Secretary of State George C. Marshall told a cabinet meeting that the Soviets would probably soon consolidate their hold on Eastern Europe by clamping down on Czechoslovakia as a "purely defensive move", and Kennan cabled from Manila that the Soviets seemed to be consolidating their defences, not preparing for aggression. He later wrote that the Prague coup and the Berlin Blockade were "defensive reactions" to the Marshall Plan's initial successes and to the Western decision to press for an independent West German state. This view of the event sees Truman's reaction as him seizing on a necessary crisis to sell the Marshall Plan and the rearmament programme the Pentagon had long been pushing.

Marshall's own reaction was that "in so far as international affairs are concerned, a seizure of power by the Communist Party in Czechoslovakia would not materially alter...the situation which has existed in the last three years". Even as he was holding a press conference to push his economic aid plan on 10 March, the CIA reported that "We do not believe...that this event reflects any sudden increase in Soviet capabilities, more aggressive intentions, or any change in current Soviet policy or tactics...The Czech coup and the demands on Finland...do not preclude the possibility of Soviet efforts to effect a rapprochement with the West", but the administration chose a different course.

On 2 March, CIA director Roscoe H. Hillenkoetter had also written to Truman that "the timing of the coup in Czechoslovakia was forced upon the Kremlin when the non-Communists took action endangering Communist control of the police. A Communist victory in the May elections would have been impossible without such control".

=== Italy and France ===
In Italy, elections were scheduled for 18 April and the Communist-dominated Popular Democratic Front stood a realistic chance of victory. In the hysteria and foreboding that gripped Western circles following the Czech coup, it was concluded that similar tactics could be employed in Italy, whose citizens might not even have a chance to vote. British Foreign Minister Ernest Bevin and the British Cabinet saw the cooperation between the two leading parties of the Italian left in almost apocalyptic terms, believing that once the Italian Communist Party (PCI) won power it would marginalise any moderating influence from the socialists. Bevin immediately concluded that the "forces of democratic Socialism" must be strengthened in Italy, and that Britain must support the Christian Democrats, despite all of their faults.

Bevin was especially alarmed by the ability of the PCI, through the use of its dominant position in the trade union movement, to organise industrial disturbances not only to sabotage the success of the Marshall Plan, but also to subvert the Italian government through factory committees of action as in Czechoslovakia. The Italian foreign minister, despite his alarm over the coup's timing, remained optimistic, assuring Bevin (who saw Italy as "the immediate danger spot") that the army and police were in excellent shape and that the coup would have an adverse effect, turning swing voters away from the socialists.

This was observed when Communist and socialist leaders in Italy defended the Czech coup as a victory for democracy, rationalizing that the violation of civil rights was a necessary and just response to a reactionary threat posed by Western imperialist (i.e., American) interests; such discourse probably damaged the Front's credibility and undercut its promises of moderation. Kennan cabled to suggest the PCI should be outlawed and the U.S. should intervene militarily in the likely event of a civil war, but he quickly softened his line.

The American Ambassador in Rome worried that the coup would push self-interested voters to side with what they considered the winning side, and that events in Prague probably increased the PCI's prestige, "direct[ing] the politics of the generally opportunistic Italian toward the Communist bandwagon". However, the coup was one of several factors that led a strong plurality of voters to vote for Christian Democracy and defeat the left. Stalin, satisfied that America had not moved militarily after the Czech coup and unwilling to provoke war, respected the result, considering Italy a Western country.

In France, interesting political currents were also set in motion. The United States was still pushing the French government to support German rehabilitation. In the aftermath of the coup, foreign minister Georges Bidault was afraid of stoking anti-German sentiment that the French Communist Party (PCF) could exploit and harness to instigate a coup of its own. At the same time, the coup had forced the hand of PCF leader Maurice Thorez, whose public remarks suggested that in the wake of a Soviet invasion, he would support the Red Army.

The Czech coup, the PCF's failed policy of sabotage and the Marshall Plan's likely passage were all beginning to sway French public opinion. 70% of French people now believed the U.S. would do more than any other country to help France, compared to 7% who thought the USSR would do more. Despite French concern about Germany, it was becoming increasingly clear that the Soviet threat was greater than the German. France would still seek an advantageous power position vis-à-vis Germany, but it was becoming reconciled to the prospect of a rehabilitated Germany as part of postwar Europe.

Along with passage of the Marshall Plan, the other far-reaching implication of the Czech coup for U.S. foreign policy was to heed Bevin's call for a Western defence association. He had found the Truman Administration reluctant to accept an unambiguous and binding alliance with Western Europe even after the irretrievable breakdown of the Council of Foreign Ministers conference in London in December 1947; Marshall was not prepared to accept the idea in discussions with Bevin that 17 December.

On 26 February, Bevin again reiterated that the best way to prevent another Czechoslovakia was to evolve a joint Western military strategy, and this time he got a more receptive hearing, especially considering American anxiety over Italy. That spring, European leaders quietly met with U.S. defence, military and diplomatic officials at the Pentagon, under Marshall's orders, exploring a framework for a new and unprecedented association for mutual defence. The following year, NATO would ultimately be born out of these talks.

== See also ==
- Gajda Affair

== Bibliography ==
- Behrman, Greg. The Most Noble Adventure: The Marshall Plan and the Time When America Helped Save Europe. Simon & Schuster, 2007, ISBN 0-7432-8263-9.
- Blaive, Muriel, "The Danger of Over-Interpreting Dissident Writing in the West: Communist Terror in Czechoslovakia, 1948–1968", in Friederike Kind-Kovács and Jessie Labov (eds.), Samizdat, Tamizdat, and Beyond: Transnational Media During and After Socialism. Berghahn Books, 2013, ISBN 978-0-857-45586-4.
- Cabada, Ladislav and Waisová, Šárka. Czechoslovakia and the Czech Republic in World Politics. Lexington Books, 2011, ISBN 0-7391-6734-0.
- Europa Publications Limited. Eastern Europe and the Commonwealth of Independent States, Volume 4. Routledge, 1999, ISBN 1-85743-058-1.
- Grenville, John Ashley Soames. A History of the World from the 20th to the 21st Century. Routledge, 2005, ISBN 0-415-28954-8.
- Grogin, Robert C. Natural Enemies: The United States and the Soviet Union in the Cold War, 1917–1991. Lexington Books, 2001, ISBN 0-7391-0160-9.
- Hochman, Jiří (1998). Historical dictionary of the Czech State. Lanham, Md: Scarecrow Press. ISBN 9780810833388.
- Hixson, Walter L. George F. Kennan: Cold War Iconoclast. Columbia University Press, 1989, ISBN 0-231-06895-6.
- Hunter, Allen. Rethinking the Cold War. Temple University Press, 1998, ISBN 1-56639-562-3.
- Kaplan, Morton A. Macropolitics: Essays on the Philosophy & Science of Politics. Transaction Publishers, 1969, ISBN 0-2023-6716-9.
- Killingsworth, Matt. Civil Society in Communist Eastern Europe. ECPR Press, 2012, ISBN 1-9073-0127-5.
- Koester, Otto. Seeing Babies in a New Light: the Life of Hanuš Papoušek. Routledge, 2005, ISBN 0-8058-4270-5.
- Kofsky, Frank. Harry S. Truman and the War Scare of 1948: A Successful Campaign to Deceive the Nation. Palgrave Macmillan, 1995, ISBN 0-312-12329-9
- Korbel, Josef. The Communist Subversion of Czechoslovakia, 1938–1948: The Failure of Co-existence (1959).
- Lonsdale, Kathleen Is Peace Possible?. Penguin Books, 1957.
- Lukes, Igor. "The 1948 Coup d'État in Prague through the Eyes of the American Embassy." Diplomacy & Statecraft 22.3 (2011): 431–449.
- Matthias, Willard C. America's Strategic Blunders: Intelligence Analysis and National Security Policy, 1936–1991. Penn State Press, 2003, ISBN 0-271-02290-6.
- Offner, Arnold A. Another Such Victory: President Truman and the Cold War, 1945–1953. Stanford University Press, 2002, ISBN 0-8047-4774-1.
- Pedaliu, Effie G. H. Britain, Italy, and the Origins of the Cold War. Palgrave Macmillan, 2003, ISBN 0-333-97380-1.
- Saxonberg, Steven. The Fall: A Comparative Study of the End of Communism in Czechoslovakia, East Germany, Hungary and Poland. Routledge, 2001, ISBN 90-5823-097-X.
- Skroug, Kenneth N. Czechoslovakia's Lost Fight for Freedom, 1967–1969. Greenwood Publishing Group, 1999, ISBN 0-275-96622-4.
- Smetana, Vít. "The US “Loss” of Czechoslovakia: On the Edge of Historical Truth." Journal of Cold War Studies 17.3 (2015): 220–226.
- Steel Ronald. Walter Lippmann and the American Century. Transaction Publishers, 1999, ISBN 0-7658-0464-6.
- Taborsky, Edward. Communism in Czechoslovakia, 1948–1960 Princeton University Press, 1961.
- Thies, Wallace J. Friendly Rivals: Bargaining and Burden-Shifting in NATO. M.E. Sharpe, 2002, ISBN 0-7656-1017-5.
- Ventresca, Robert. From Fascism to Democracy: Culture and Politics in the Italian Election of 1948. University of Toronto Press, 2004, ISBN 0-8020-8768-X.
- Vertzberger, Yaacov. Risk Taking and Decisionmaking: Foreign Military Intervention Decisions. Stanford University Press, 1998, ISBN 0-8047-2747-3.
- Waller, Michael. The End of the Communist Power Monopoly. Manchester University Press ND, 1993, ISBN 0-7190-3819-7.
