= Operation Clay =

Operation during world war II

Coordinates: 49°15′6″N 17°35′3″E

- Part of World War II
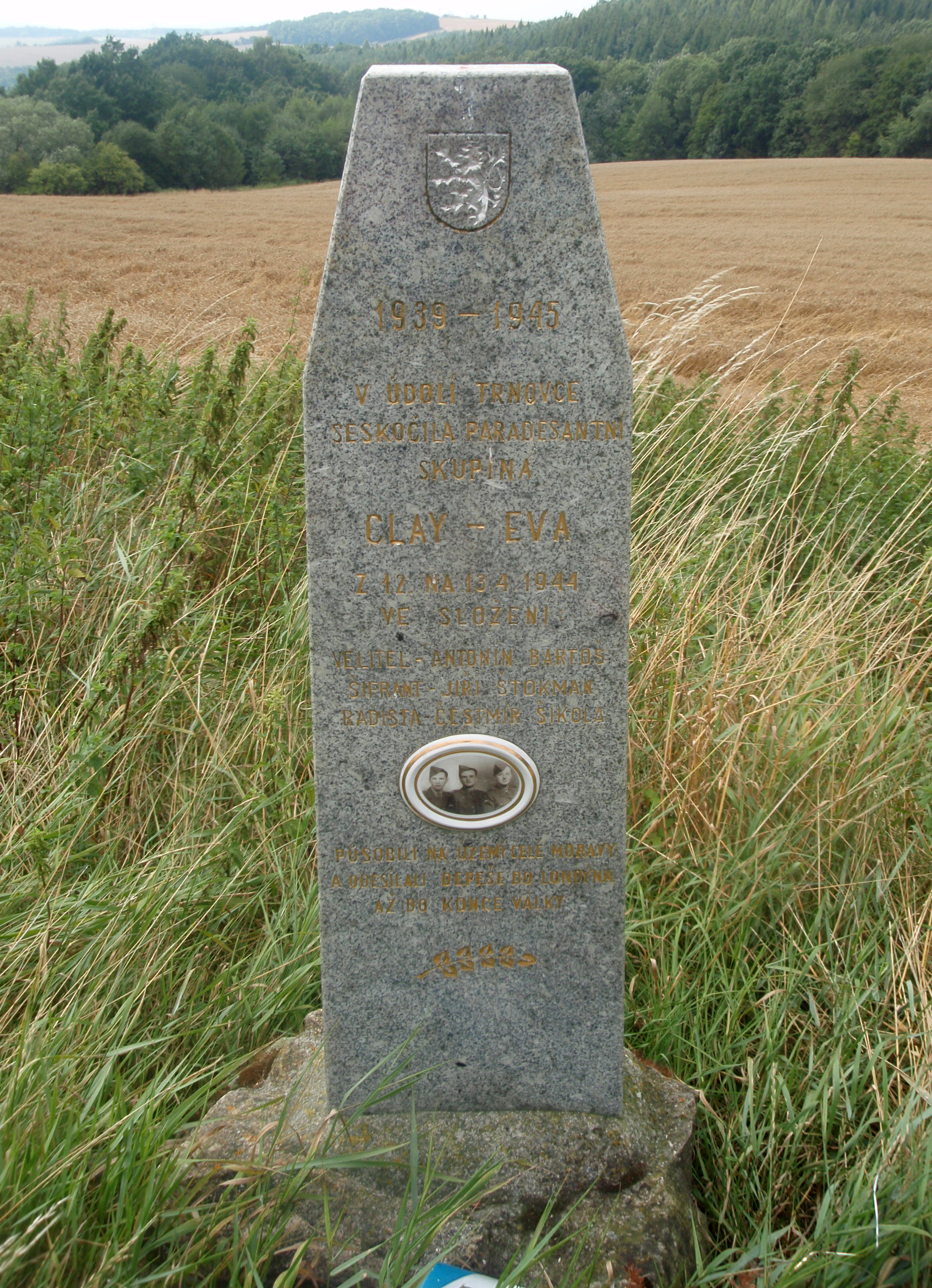
- Memorial in Hostišová
- Type: Military operation
- Location: Protectorate of Bohemia and Moravia
- Planned by: Czechoslovak Ministry of Defence in London
- Objective: To gather intelligence in the region of Northern Moravia, and transmit by radio to London
- Date: 13 April 1944
- Executed by: Antonín Bartoš, Jiří Štokman and Čestmír Šikola
- Outcome: One of the most successful operations of the war

Operation Clay (also known as Clay-Eva; Eva was a code name for radio transmitter) was a cover name for the operation executed during World War II in the Protectorate of Bohemia and Moravia by Czech paratroopers trained in England. It was organized by intelligence section of exile, Czechoslovak Ministry of Defence in London. It was part of third wave of special tasks operations in Nazi-occupied territory.

== Members and tasks ==
The members of Clay group were sergeant Antonín Bartoš, sergeant Jiří Štokman and radio-operator sergeant Čestmír Šikola. They gathered intelligence in the region of Northern Moravia, which they transmitted by radio to London. This involved coordination with resistance groups.

== Operation ==
The group, with the Carbon group, was dropped on 13 April near the village of Hostišová. After a three-day hike, they reached Bystřice pod Hostýnem, where they hid. Their first message was transmitted on 30 April 1944. In the Valašsko & Slovácko region, they established an intelligence network of cooperating residents and resistance members. They also supported to members of Operation Carbon.

In the autumn of 1944, two confidents of the Gestapo infiltrated the intelligence network created by the Clay group. Both Gestapo informants, František Bednář and František Šmíd, were verified through London's Radio, and Brno's Gestapo managed to gather and destroy information about members of Clay group by February 1945, the same month in which Šmíd was executed in February 1945 by members of the Jan Žižka partisan brigade.

After they were taken by surprise by the Gestapo in the village Tvrdonice, the group managed to shoot their way out and hide in the villages of Hrušky and Josefov, where they made radio-contact with London. They joined partisan fighters and sent 800 radio messages and coordinated weapons drops. It was one of the most successful operations of the war.
