= Antonín Bartoš =

Antonin Bartos
- Antonín Bartoš
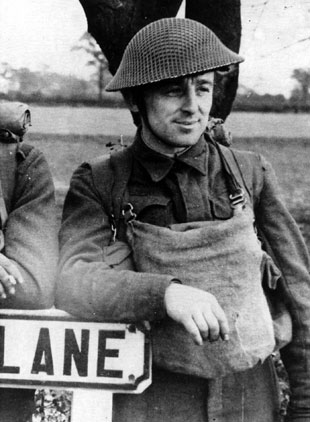
- Young Antonín Bartoš
- Born: 12 September 1910; Lanžhot, Moravia, Austria-Hungary
- Died: 13 December 1998 (aged 88); New York, United States
- Occupations: Soldier-paratrooper, member of national assembly, construction engineer

Antonín Bartoš (12 September 1910 – 13 December 1998) was a Czech soldier, member of the World War II Czechoslovak resistance (and commander of Operation Clay), postwar member of the National Assembly for the Czechoslovak National Socialist Party, and later participant of anti-communist resistance.

== Youth ==
Bartoš was born in Lanžhot, Moravia, Austria-Hungary, on 12 September 1910. His father was a railway employee, and his mother was a housewife. He had two brothers and a sister. He passed four grades of primary school, and in 1929 passed an exam in Břeclav gymnasium. From 1930 to 1932, he was a postal service employee in Břeclav.

On 1 March 1932, he started his national service with the border patrol battalion in Trebišov. After failed admission to a military academy to become an officer (for medical reasons, apparently due to his previous dispute with a regiment doctor), he was discharged from military service and returned to work for National Mail. On 24 September 1938, he was drafted back into the army, and after dissolution of the army returned first Hodonín and later to Brno.

== Exile ==
From the fear of imprisonment, he escaped the country (then under German occupation). Through Slovakia, Hungary, Yugoslavia and Syria managed to get to France. There he joined a Czechoslovak force with which he took part in the Battle of France. After the Allied defeat he was evacuated to Great Britain.

He landed in England on 13 July 1940, and was assigned to 2nd march battalion. From 2 January to 15 March 1941, he trained at military school and was promoted to lance corporal. Upon his own request he was assigned to special task unit where from 21 February until 19 December 1942 participated in sabotage, parachute and industrial espionage training. During the final stage of conspiracy training he was already promoted to corporal. On 7 March 1943 he was promoted to sergeant. Before 3 June 1943 he finished his civil job training as a mechanic. From 12 July 1943 he took part in another two trainings in radio communication in London and Scotland. From 11 to 23 October he 1943 stayed at waiting station from which he was transferred to Algeria. Here he continued his training.

== Deployment ==
After an unsuccessful attempt, he was dropped on 13 April 1944 together with other members of the unit near Hostišová. The unit under his command carried out extensive espionage and organized a network of cooperating citizens in the Valašské Meziříčí region.

== After the war ==
After he checked in to the ministry of defense, he requested release from military service. From June 1945 he started to be actively involved in politics on behalf of National Socialist Party. In the years of 1945-1946 he was member of provisional National Assembly and in 1946-1948 member of parliament.

On 3 September 1945, he was promoted to Captain of march regiment. In December 1945, Bartoš got married and in August 1946 his wife gave birth to a son, Antonín Jr. In the same year he was promoted to a Major.

After the communist coup in February 1948 he escaped with his family to France, where the Bartoš family operated the Maryša restaurant for Czechoslovak émigrés. The following year, he was stripped of his army ranks and Czech citizenship.

Under the command of general František Moravec he took part in organizing and dispatching messengers into Czechoslovakia, where they helped to organize espionage and bring refugees across the border. In November 1952 he moved with his family to the United States where he worked as a construction engineer.

On 8 May 1993 his army ranks were restored and he was promoted to Generalmajor; however Bartoš died before his Czech citizenship was reinstated. In 2000 a memorial plaque was placed on his birth house.
