= Študlov =

Študlov may refer to places in the Czech Republic:

- Študlov (Svitavy District), a municipality and village in the Pardubice Region
- Študlov (Zlín District), a municipality and village in the Zlín Region
