= Jan Žižka partisan brigade =

1st Czechoslovak Partisan Brigade of Jan Žižka
- 1. československá partizánská brigáda Jana Žižky
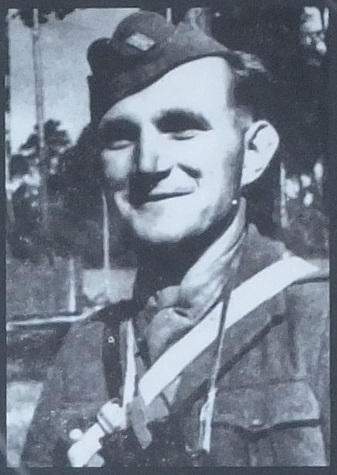
- Lieutenant Ján Ušiak, unit's first commander
- Active: 21 August 1944–26 May 1945
- Country: Czechoslovakia
- Allegiance: Soviet Union
- Type: Partisan brigade
- Role: Guerrilla warfare
- Size: 1,232 partisans (on 5 May 1945)
- Patron: Jan Žižka
- Engagements: Battle of Štiavnik; Battle of Velké Karlovice; Operation Grouse

Commanders
- Commanders: (Czechoslovakia) Lieutenant Ján Ušiak (Soviet Union) Captain Dajan Bajanovič Murzin (Soviet Union) Lieutenant Ivan Petrovič Stěpanov

The 1st Czechoslovak Partisan Brigade of Jan Žižka (Czech: 1. československá partizánská brigáda Jana Žižky or Partyzánská brigáda Jana Žižky z Trocnova), initially known as Ušiak-Murzin Unit, was the largest partisan unit in the Protectorate of Bohemia and Moravia (modern day Czech Republic) during the German occupation of Czechoslovakia. After its core of Soviet-trained paratroopers was dropped into Slovakia in August 1944, the brigade crossed into Moravia and began operations in earnest at the end of 1944. Its focus was guerrilla warfare, especially sabotage and intelligence gathering.

== Background ==
=== German occupation ===
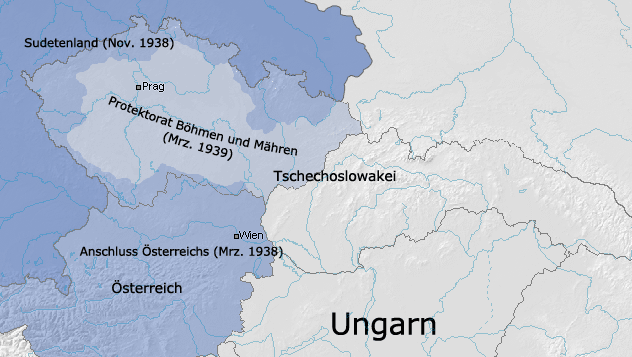
The Protectorate, Slovakia, and neighboring countries

In 1938, German Chancellor Adolf Hitler announced his intentions to annex the Sudetenland, a region of Czechoslovakia with a high ethnic German population. As the previous appeasement of Hitler had shown, the governments of both France and Britain were intent on avoiding war. British Prime Minister Neville Chamberlain and other Western political leaders negotiated with German Chancellor Adolf Hitler and ultimately acquiesced to his demands at the Munich Agreement, in exchange for guarantees from Nazi Germany that no additional lands would be annexed. No Czechoslovak representatives were present at the negotiations. Five months later, when the Slovak Diet declared the independence of Slovakia, Hitler summoned Czechoslovak President Emil Hácha to Berlin and forced him to accept the German occupation of the Czech rump state and its re-organisation into the German-dominated Protectorate of Bohemia and Moravia. Germany promptly invaded and occupied the remaining Czech territories. Although France had a defensive alliance with Czechoslovakia, neither Paris nor London intervened militarily.

The Nazis considered many Czechs to be ethnically Aryan, and therefore suitable for Germanisation. As a consequence, the German occupation was less harsh than in other Slavic nations. For example, food rations in the Protectorate of Bohemia and Moravia were almost identical to those in Germany. The occupation influenced the daily life of ordinary Czechs by the militarisation of the economy, the elimination of political rights, and transportation to Germany for forced labour. More than 20,000 Czechs were executed, and thousands more were deported to concentration camps. While the general violence of the occupation was less severe than in Eastern Europe, it nevertheless caused many Czech people to hate the Germans living within the Protectorate, and support partisan groups.

=== Military situation ===
Although there was wide popular support for the resistance, in other ways the Protectorate was ill-suited to partisan activity. There were very few guns, despite the relatively liberal firearms policies in place prior to the occupation. The Protectorate was highly urbanized, which made the establishment of partisan field camps in woods or mountains impractical, and the excellent transport and communications infrastructure was at the disposal of the Nazi security apparatus. Also, the ethnic German minority tended to cooperate with the occupiers and some local Germans joined the security forces, which benefited from their fluency in Czech and knowledge of the local geography.

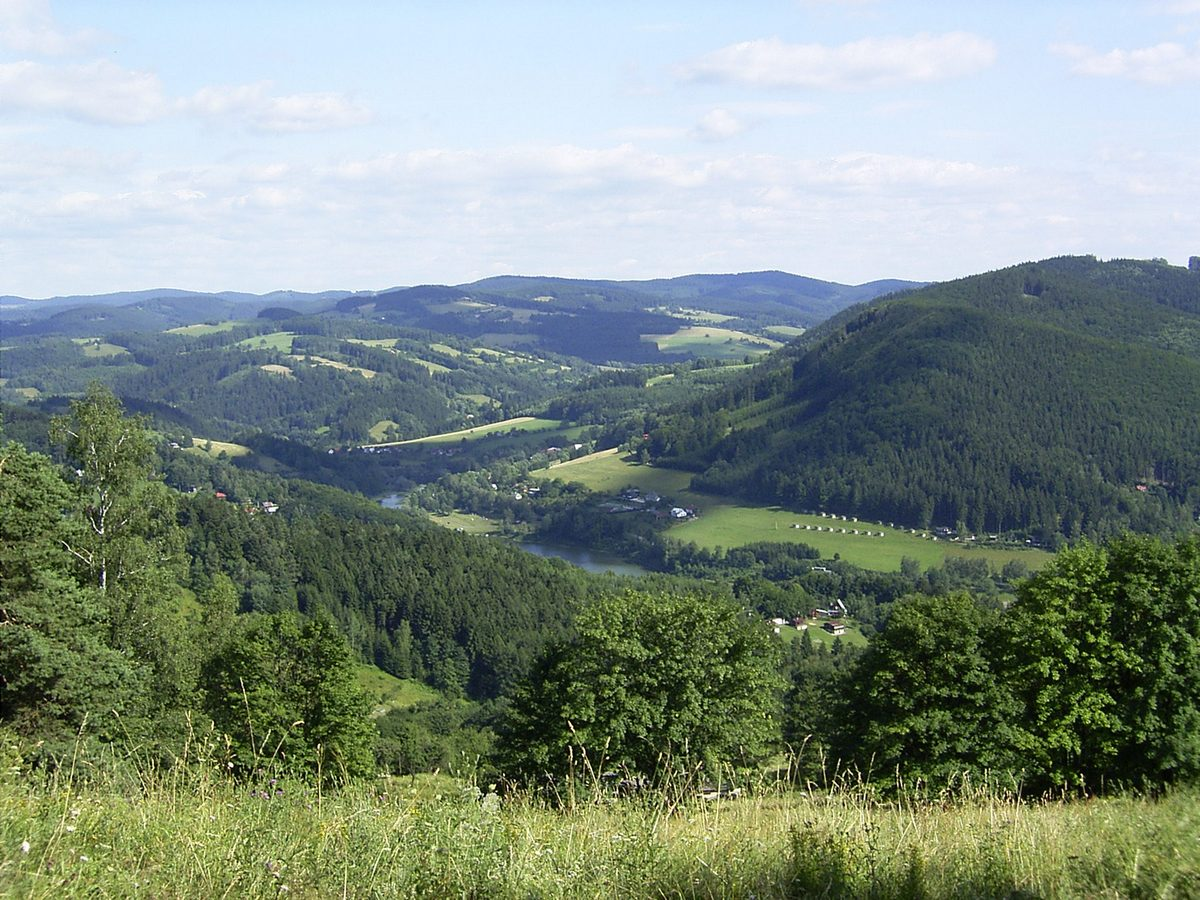
Hostýn-Vsetín Mountains, base of the Green Cadre

The Nazi administration brought in Reinhard Heydrich as Deputy Protector of Bohemia and Moravia in order to enforce policy more harshly. His brutality led to the Allies ordering his assassination in May 1942. In the violent crackdown that followed, known in Czech as the Heydrichiáda, more than a thousand Czechs were murdered, including the entire village of Lidice. Some former members of the resistance evaded arrest by fleeing into the Moravian mountains and forming partisan groups. The first documented partisan group was the Green Cadre (Czech: Zelený kádr), active in the Hostýn-Vsetín Mountains along the Czech–Slovak border from early 1942. There were also urban resistance groups, such as the White Lioness (Czech: Bílá lvice) active in the areas of Silesia around Frýdek-Místek and Ostrava. Such partisan groups depended on the support of the local population and acted by cutting power lines and sabotaging railways. Beginning in April 1944, several paratrooper groups trained in Britain were dropped in Moravia in order to gather intelligence. (Note: In 1944, the British dropped the following groups into Moravia: April: Operation Carbon and Operation Clay; May: Operation Spelter; July: Operation Potash; September: Operation Wolfram; December: Operation Tungsten (cs)) However, according to historian Detlef Brandes, the emergence of the Žižka brigade was the beginning of effective guerilla resistance in the Protectorate.

== History ==
=== Formation of the unit ===
At the end of 1943, Czechoslovak Communist politicians asked the Soviet government to organize a partisan movement in the Protectorate and Slovakia. Partisan units for deployment in Czechoslovakia received training in Sviatoshyn, a suburb of Kiev. To support advancing Soviet troops, paratroopers were deployed in advance, initially in Carpathian Ruthenia, then in Slovakia and finally also in Moravia.

The partisan group that would become known as the Jan Žižka brigade was formed during training in Sviatoshyn. Most of its initial twenty-one members, including the commander, Lieutenant Ján Ušiak, were ethnic Slovaks, in accordance with the initial plans to deploy in Slovakia. Before the training at Sviatoshyn, some of them had fought as partisans in Belarus or in the Crimea/Odessa region. The unit also included Hungarian defectors and seven Soviets, including Captain Dajan Bajanovič Murzin, second-in-command.

The "Ušiak-Murzin Unit" parachuted near Sklabiňa, Slovakia in two groups, on the night of 21–22 August 1944 and the night of 30–31 August. The day before the first group arrived, a local partisan group which controlled the area had publicly announced the restoration of the Czechoslovak state. The original orders had been for the unit to cross the Fatra mountain range and begin operations in northwest Slovakia. However, the plans were disrupted by the Slovak National Uprising, began on 29 August. Initially, the unit conducted reconnaissance on a German counter-offensive, but soon Ušiak received orders to redeploy to Moravia, and on 6 September they began to move north. The Ušiak-Murzin Unit was joined by many Czech fugitives who wanted to fight on their own territory. Other recruits were former Slovak Army soldiers.

=== Transfer to Moravia ===
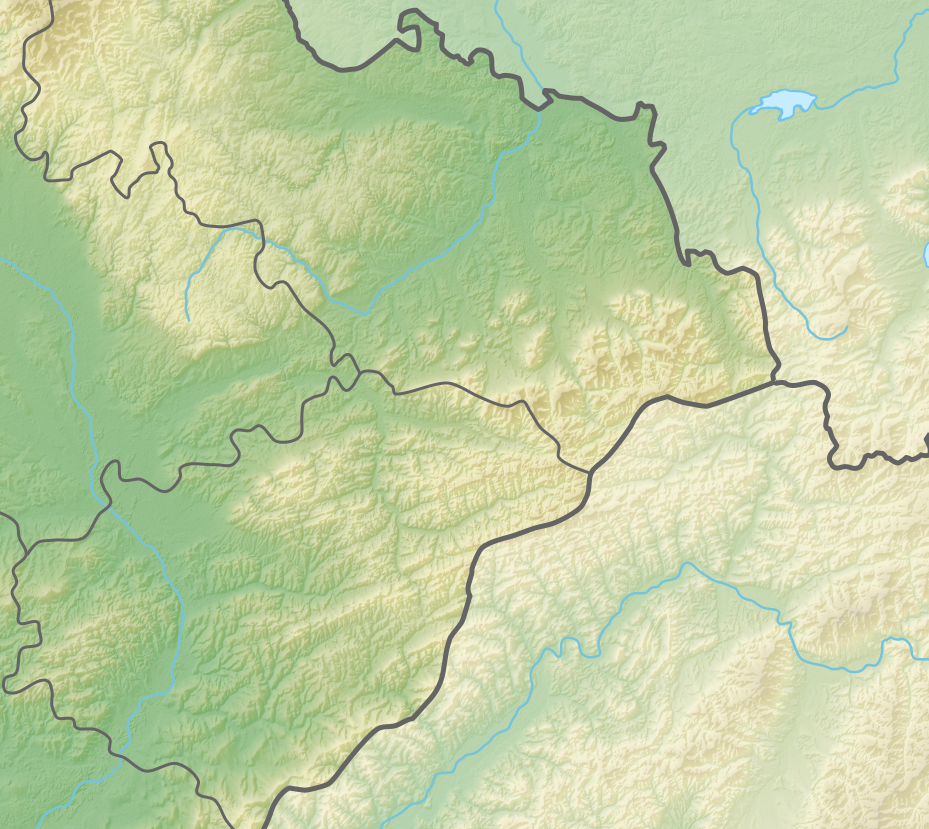
Movement through 10 October

Although the partisans had intended to reach the border undetected, there were two skirmishes before the unit reached Štiavnik, a Slovak town near the border. Since the Štiavnik police and other Slovak forces in the area had defected to join the Slovak National Uprising, the unit, now grown to 150 members, established itself around Štiavnik, controlling a small area to the rear of the German forces. In Štiavnik more troops joined the unit, mostly Czechs crossing the border from the Protectorate in order to join the Uprising, but they also included escaped Soviet prisoners of war who had fled from camps as far away as Saxony and crossed Bohemia and Moravia with the help of the local population. The unit was formally named after Jan Žižka, the 15th-century leader of the Hussite army, whose fight for religious freedom and use of innovative military techniques had made him a Czech national hero.

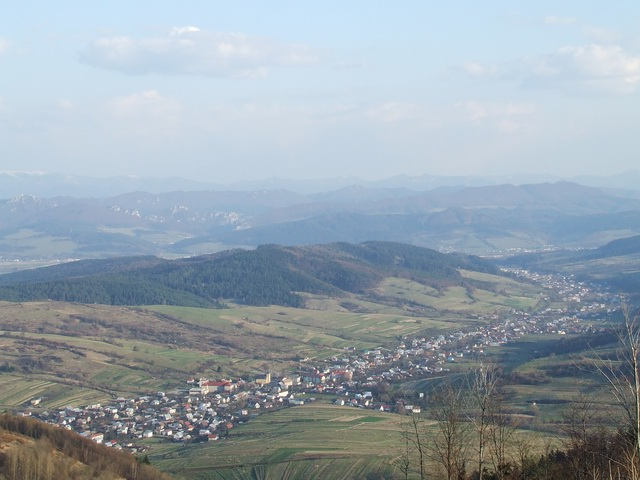
View of Štiavnik from Doktorovec hill

In order to stem the flow of Czechs joining the Slovak National Uprising, the Germans closed the border and made unauthorized crossing punishable by death on 16 September. Attempts to cross the border as a unit were made on the nights of 21-22 and 24–25 September near Velké Karlovice. As both attempts failed after skirmishes with German border guards, Murzin crossed the border with a smaller group of 60 partisans on the night of 28–29 September. Some 300 partisans remained in Slovakia, their numbers daily augmented by newcomers. In early October, the border was reinforced by about 300 SS military policemen, making it more difficult for the Žižka partisans to cross back into Moravia. On 10 October, the Germans attacked Štiavnik. Fighting lasted for about three days with partisan losses estimated at 200 around Štiavnik and in skirmishes with border guards while attempting to cross into Moravia. Only 130-140 guerrillas managed to cross the border; those left behind included twelve of the fourteen Soviet-trained Slovaks.

=== Consolidation at Čertův Mlýn ===
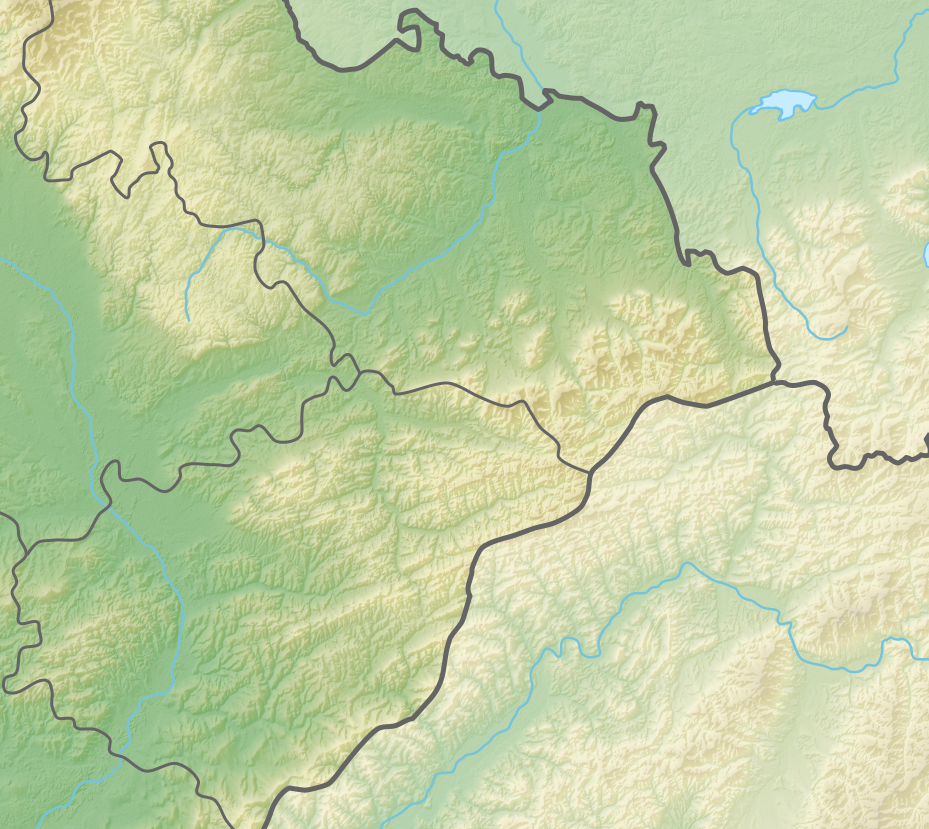
Operations in October 1944

In Moravia, the unit settled in a hunting lodge on the slopes of Magurka Mountain and made contact with the British-trained Wolfram partisan group. (Note: The Wolfram group's purpose, unlike the other British-supported groups, was to incite a Czechoslovak guerrilla movement among the local population.) Concerned that an attack by American bombers on 14 October had drawn unwanted attention from German security forces, the Murzin partisans took refuge in the Wolfram group's base at Trojačka. Because the Wolfram group was expecting an airdrop of supplies from Britain, twenty-one partisans were transferred from the Murzin group to Wolfram. In exchange, Murzin received a significant amount of money necessary to fund his operations.

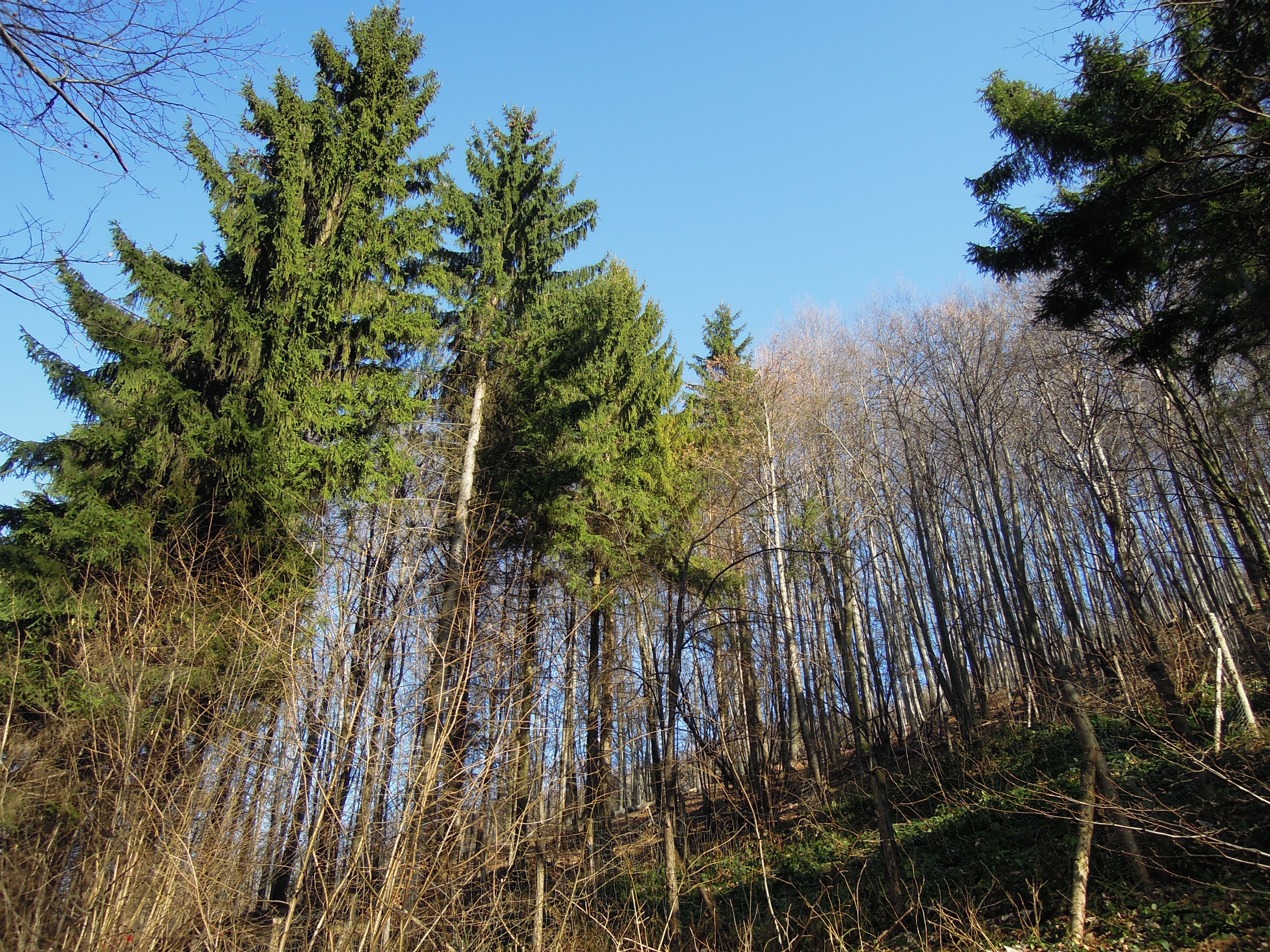
Woods around Trojačka

One of those transferred was Stanislav Kotačka, a petty thief who had joined the partisans to avoid detention in a concentration camp. After murdering a Wolfram partisan, he turned himself in and offered to inform on the partisans in exchange for erasing his criminal record. At 4:30 on 23 October, he led 300 German soldiers to the base, but the partisans managed to escape. While German security forces burned buildings and terrorized civilians in the area around Trojačka, the Žižka partisans separated from the Wolfram group and established a new, more permanent base at Čertův Mlýn. (Note: A mountain 0.4 km from Magurka) They benefited from supplies and information provided by friendly Czech civilians, some of the members of Obrana Národa.

Two groups were sent further southwest, under the command of Ivan Petrovič Stěpanov and Viktor Ševcov-Grekovskij. They made contact with other groups already established in and around Vsetín. (Note: Including Pro vlast, the Štramberk partisans, Clay, the Lipták Group and Josef Sousedík's organization.) The groups gathered clothing and provisions for the winter and raided police stations (sometimes in cooperation with local Czech policemen) for firearms and ammunition. By the end of October, the unit had grown to over 200 men and women, divided into four sub-groups: one guarded the base while the other three operated in the surrounding area.

=== German countermeasures ===
==== Gestapo ruse ====
The Gestapo attempted to lure the unit's leaders into a meeting with agents who presented themselves as leaders of communist resistance groups. Ušiak was unaware that almost all resistance organizations had been infiltrated by the Gestapo and their members caught and executed. Therefore, he agreed to a meeting on 2 November, in a location not far from the base. Unbeknownst to the Gestapo, however, anti-partisan army units were also deployed in the area and by chance turned up at the meeting, spoiling the Gestapo's plans. Both Ušiak and Murzin were wounded in the ensuing gunfight, and fled in different directions. Ušiak was hidden by civilians in Čeladná, but was soon tracked down and committed suicide to avoid capture. Murzin was hidden for three weeks in a forest dugout, but the partisans did not know his whereabouts. Meanwhile, Germans captured another partisan who revealed names of civilians who had aided the partisans. In a raid on the base the next day, four partisans were killed and two others captured.

Operation Grouse
- Part of German occupation of Czechoslovakia
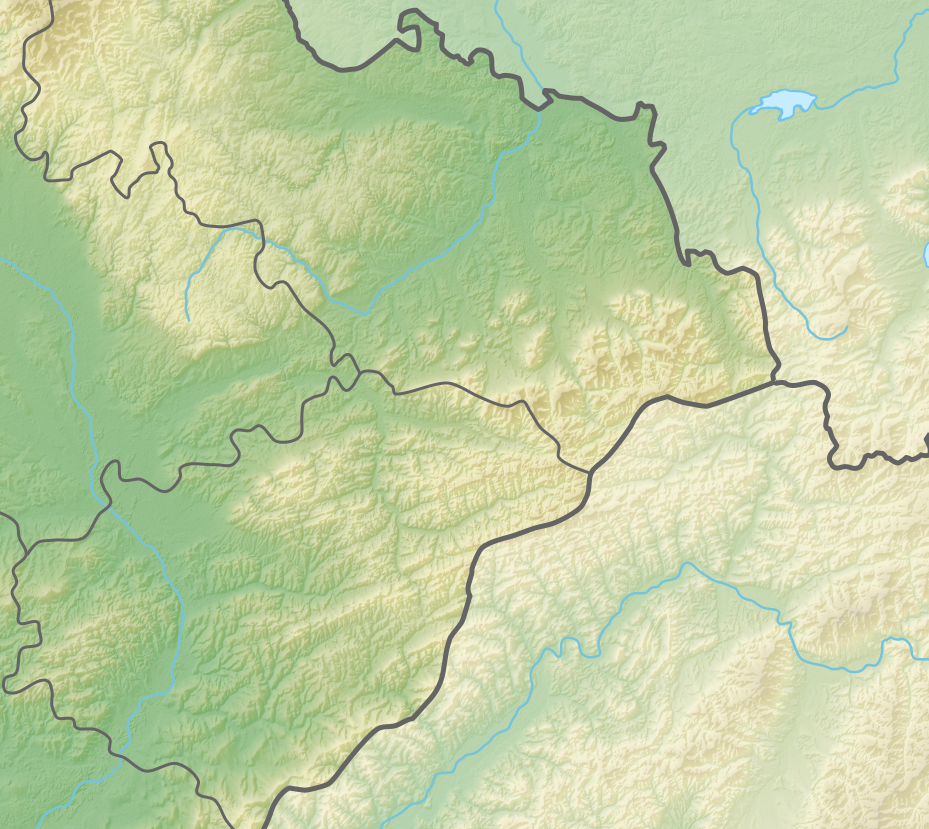
- German cordon area
Date	16–22 November 1944
Location	Moravian-Silesian Beskids
Result	Dispersal of partisan forces

Belligerents
Nazi Germany	Czechoslovakia

Commanders and leaders
(Nazi Germany) Karl Hermann Frank; (Nazi Germany) Hans Windeck; (Nazi Germany) Georg Attenberger	(Czechoslovakia) Josef Otisk

Units involved
	(Czechoslovakia) Jan Žižka partisan brigade (Czechoslovakia) Wolfram group

Strength
13,059	~ 200

Casualties and losses
6 killed, 3 wounded	8 killed, 4 captured
- 13-40 civilian suspects were arrested and executed

On 3 November, Higher SS and Police Leader Karl Hermann Frank ordered the summary executions of suspected partisans along with those suspected of helping them. The bodies of executed suspects were to be hanged in public for 48 hours. A wave of arrests and executions decimated the civilian supporters of the partisans. Although the Czech police forces often supported the partisans, they undermined the public approval for them by stealing from Czechs, and some civilians did inform on the partisans. Due to the increasing partisan activity in the area, the Germans posted guards at railway bridges to prevent sabotage.

==== Operation Grouse ====
Operation Grouse (Czech: Tetřev, German: Auerhuhn) started on the morning of 16 November, when the Germans sealed off a cordon area defined by the towns of Rožnov, Frenštát, Čeladná, Staré Hamry, and Chata Bečvice. The 55-kilometer cordon was carefully monitored and no one was allowed entry or exit; a system of passwords was employed to prevent guerrillas from impersonating German soldiers. The commander, Generalleutnant Hans Windeck, aimed to flush the partisans out of the dense forests on the east of the cordon area into the more open areas to the west, and there decisively destroy both Wolfram and the Žižka partisans. The Germans committed some 13,000 soldiers and police to the operation. (Note: Forces committed included units of the Allgemeine SS, Gestapo, and Kripo, as well as regular Wehrmacht troops.) However, due in part to inclement weather, the cordon was not as impervious as the Germans intended, and the local population helped partisans escape at night. Poor coordination between the Wehrmacht and police forces hampered the effectiveness of the operation. Georg Attenberger, an SS officer involved in the operation, also blamed the insufficient training of the Wehrmacht units and the laziness of the police.

For their extensive manpower deployment, the Germans had little to show: only eight partisans killed and between 13 and 40 suspected civilian supporters captured and executed, at the cost of six German soldiers killed and three wounded. After the operation, no guerrilla activity was reported in the cordon area, but increased outside of it. The Žižka brigade had lost its base, provisions, and radio communication with the Red Army. The German show of force discouraged the civilian population from providing food and intelligence to the partisans. To make matters even worse, the fate of the unit's commanders remained unknown. It took another two weeks to transport Murzin, the surviving commander, to the partisans' new operational area in the Hostýn-Vsetín Mountains.

=== Reorganization ===
Stěpanov's and Ševcov-Grekovskij's groups had established themselves outside the area blockaded by Operation Grouse. After being transported to the new base, Murzin assumed command. The unit was restructured and its tactical approach transformed. It was divided into smaller groups which were spread over a wider area, and avoided staying in one place for too long. Most command positions were taken by escaped Soviet POWs, who had more military experience. By the end of the war, the command structure was largely decentralized and the brigade was operating in a large area in eastern and central Moravia.

With brigade membership rising, Murzin decided to restrict the number of partisans accepted into the forest units due to the limited supply of food and weapons. (Note: Most guns were taken from German security forces during raids. In February 1945, eleven Belgian members of Technische Nothilfe, entrusted with the protection of an arms factory in Jablunkov, deserted and joined the brigade, bringing with them a significant stockpile of arms and ammunition.) Preference was given to escaped POWs and to Czech resistance members who had been exposed and were evading arrest. Those turned away were instructed to start their own partisan units in the urban areas. Some members lived a double life, joining the partisans only for night raids.

== Operations ==
=== Sabotage ===
Specific aspects of waging partisan warfare in Moravia involved the following factors:
- a dense network of military garrisons
- military control and protection of military and industrial premises, roads, railway stations, bridges and administrative institutions
- a diversified Gestapo network supported by spies in towns, settlements and villages
- special penal units of SS, Schutzpolizei, [Russian Liberation Army] and field gendarmes in the mountains and woods, in areas known to contain partisan bases and battalions
—Murzin's notes

The extent of brigade operations was constrained by availability of armaments. Following Operation Grouse, the brigade was scattered and had lost most of their ammunition and explosives. Therefore, in December the partisans were forced to focus on consolidation and acquiring weapons, with offensive operations gradually increasing from January. During the early months of 1945, many retreating German and Hungarian units passed through or were stationed in the brigade's operational area. This led to the acquisition of a large number of guns from raids; demoralized Hungarian soldiers would often trade their weapons for food or drink.

Avoiding direct encounters with larger German units, the partisans sabotaged railways, bridges, telecommunications and factory power-lines. The brigade's most important operations relied on the use of improvised explosive devices. Most of the explosives were either seized from the German forces or from civilians. For example, 600 kg (1,300 lb) originally intended for a quarry was stolen in January. The explosives experts were mostly Czech civilians who joined the brigade. By March 1945 the brigade was conducting raids on daily basis. One of its most celebrated operations was the capture of Generalleutnant Dietrich von Müller, the commanding officer of Germany's 16th Panzer Division, on 19 April.

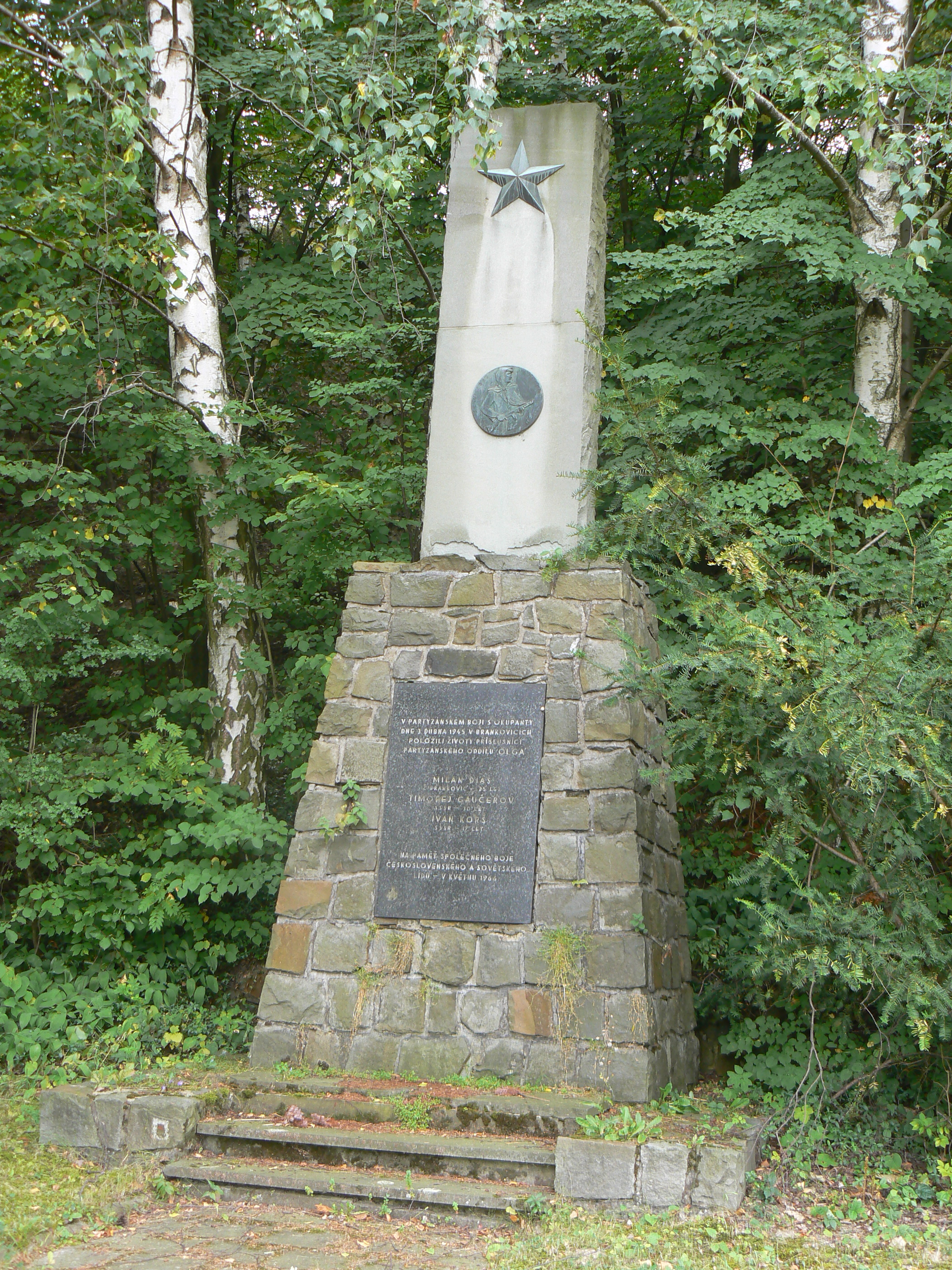
Memorial to fallen members of the brigade's group Olga, which captured Müller

When the front-line reached the brigade's operational area on 26 April, the partisans took part in front-line operations. Many then joined the army units in their campaigning further west, being used mostly as armed intelligence personnel.

=== Intelligence ===
Apart from disruption of the German rear, the brigade's other strategic objective was gathering intelligence. Effectiveness of intelligence support to the Soviet war effort was much reduced with the loss of radio communication on 12 November. By the end of December, the brigade's staff were back in contact with the Red Army, using the radio of the Luč intelligence unit which had recently been parachuted to the area. However, the communications disruption also necessitated a period of confidence rebuilding; during the weeks of radio silence the Soviet commanders had believed the unit lost. By then, a rivalry had developed between the brigade and 1st Ukrainian Front's intelligence officers.

The partisans gathered information on the positions, armaments and strength of German units, the locations of armories and warehouses, the position of fortifications, and status reports concerning airfields, movements and transportation of German units. Information was also provided on ethnic Germans, Czech collaborators and informers, as well as on the fighting operations of the brigade itself and on its civilian supporters. Much important intelligence came from Government Army policemen, some of whom actively assisted the partisans by causing diversions for raids or fighting alongside the partisans. However, the brigade's most valuable intelligence source was the commander of the German barracks in Holešov, Major Josef Hübner. Hübner used his personal driver, anti-fascist Hans Kocher, to pass information on planned raids and the uncovering of resistance members.

=== Countermeasures ===
The German occupation forces redeployed a Waffen-SS platoon, the 31st Special Operations Group, along with their 20th SS Police Regiment, to Moravia. The 31st Special Operations Group was experienced in anti-partisan warfare from previous experience in Yugoslavia, and was also known for its brutality towards Czech civilians. German forces murdered civilians suspected of supporting the partisans, sometimes beating pregnant women to death as well as burning suspects alive. German counter-intelligence also employed a fake partisan unit consisting of 16 Russian Liberation Army soldiers led by an ethnic German bilingual in Czech, but failed to infiltrate the brigade when the ruse was discovered.

== Legacy ==
The brigade was demobilized on 26 May 1945, having been deployed in the days immediately after the war as a security force searching for German soldiers hiding in the Moravian mountains and forests. According to Murzin's post-war report, the brigade consisted of 1,232 people on 5 May 1945. (Note: 927 Czechs and Slovaks, 257 Soviet citizens, and 48 partisans of other nationalities, including German anti-fascists, an Austrian deserter, Hungarians, and Romanians. More than 20 nationalities were represented.) 1,533 persons had been members, of which 304 were killed and 208 wounded. A significant number of partisans and many who aided them were women. 1,126 members were decorated by the Czechoslovak government, more than any other partisan unit. (Note: 203 partisans of the Jan Kozina Brigade and 155 partisans of the Jan Hus Brigade were decorated.)

The brigade has a controversial legacy in Moravia, partly due to its Soviet affiliation; the Communist regime was accused of glorifying Soviet partisans including the Jan Žižka brigade. Partisans were frequently described as drunkards, adventurers, and bandits, who were more of a threat than the German occupiers. (Note: In order to counter such perceptions, surviving members commissioned a history of the brigade by Marie Hrošová.) The partisans did steal from locals who were unwilling to feed them, executed German prisoners, and conducted summary executions of civilians suspected of collaboration, some of whom turned out to be innocent.

== Notable members ==
- Alexander Dubček joined the brigade in August 1944.
- Max Hrdliczka, shareholder of Impregna AG in Bystrice pod Hostynem supported Jan Ziska financially via his bookkeeper Oldrich Dolak, Karel Bubenicek from Impregna AG, production manager, was active member of Jan Ziska, source: Karel Bubenicek; Partyzani na domaci Front, 1982, Lipnik n Bec
