= Evžen Erban =

Czech politician (1912–1994)

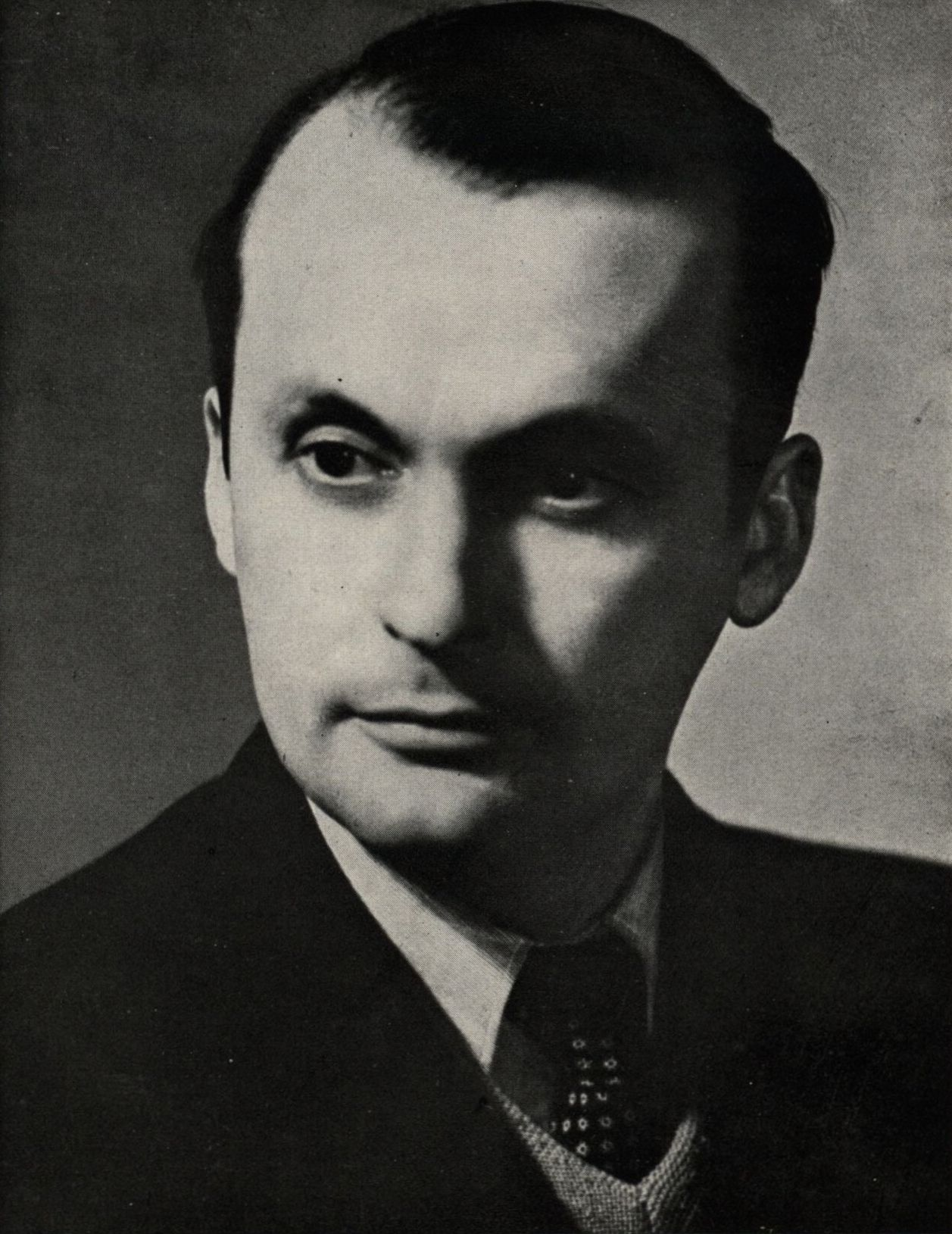
- Erban in 1948

Minister of Labour and Social Welfare
- In office 25 February 1948 – 8 September 1951
- Prime Minister: Klement Gottwald (1948); Antonín Zápotocký (1948–1951)
- Preceded by: Zdeněk Nejedlý
- Succeeded by: Jaroslav Havelka

Personal details
- Born: 18 June 1912 Vsetín, Austria-Hungary
- Died: 26 July 1994 (aged 82) Prague, Czech Republic
- Party: Czechoslovak Social Democratic Workers' Party (before 1948); Communist Party of Czechoslovakia (after 1948)

Evžen Erban (18 June 1912 – 26 July 1994) was a Czech and Czechoslovak politician and trade unionist. Initially a member of the Czechoslovak Social Democratic Workers' Party (ČSSD) and from 1948 of the Communist Party of Czechoslovakia (KSČ), he held several important posts during the Czechoslovak Socialist Republic.

== Biography ==
After finishing grammar school in Nový Jičín, Erban studied at the Faculty of Law at Charles University in Prague from 1931 to 1935. During his time at university he became active in social democratic student and youth organizations, and from 1936 he worked as a secretary for various trade unions. After the occupation of the Czech lands by Nazi Germany in 1939, Erban worked for the National Employees' Trade Union Center (NOÚZ), which was the only trade union allowed to operate in the Protectorate of Bohemia and Moravia by the Germans. Erban used the structure of the NOÚZ to organize resistance activities, and was simultaneously active in underground trade union work. During World War II, he also supported the founding of the London-based Czechoslovak National Council and actively participated in the Prague uprising of May 1945.

After the war Erban served as General Secretary of the Central Council of Trade Unions (ÚRO) between 1945 and 1950, where he worked closely with Antonín Zápotocký. He was also a member of the General Council of the World Federation of Trade Unions between 1945 and 1949. From 1945 he was a deputy of the Interim National Assembly, the first post-war parliament of Czechoslovakia, and would remain a deputy to parliament until 1952. Belonging to the left wing of the ČSSD, Erban was a proponent of close cooperation between the ČSSD and the KSČ; he supported the merging of the former party with the latter in 1948, and served as a member of the Presidium of the Central Committee of the KSČ from 1948 until 1952. From February 1948 until September 1951, he served as Minister of Social Welfare in the governments of Klement Gottwald and Antonín Zápotocký.

Like many other former social democrats, Erban was dismissed as a government minister in the early 1950s. He was instead appointed chairman of the State Social Security Office in 1952, and would remain as such until 1963. Erban also continued to hold leadership positions in international labor and social welfare organizations, including as a board member of the International Social Security Association in 1957–1962 and of the International Labour Organization in Geneva in 1958–1961. With the beginning of the period of normalization in the wake of the Prague Spring in 1968, Erban returned to Czechoslovak political life: he again served as a member of the Central Committee of the KSČ from 1968 until 1986, including as a member of the Presidium in 1968–1971. In April–September 1968 he was General Secretary and in 1968–1971 Chairman of the National Front, and from 1969 he served as a deputy to the Chamber of Nations of the Federal Assembly.

Known as a pragmatist during the normalization period, Erban met with Václav Havel in the summer of 1989 and called for dialogue with the opposition in November of that year. After the Velvet Revolution, he declared himself a social democrat and tried to participate in the post-communist political development in the Federal Assembly, but resigned in January 1990.

== Honours and awards ==
=== Czechoslovak honours ===
- Order of the Republic, two times (7 May 1955; 18 June 1962)
- Order of Klement Gottwald (27 June 1968)
- Order of Victorious February (20 February 1973)

=== Foreign honours ===
- (Polish People's Republic) Grand Cross of the Order of Polonia Restituta (1948)
- (People's Republic of Bulgaria) Order of 9 September 1944, 1st Class (1948)
