= Študlov (Zlín District) =

- Municipality
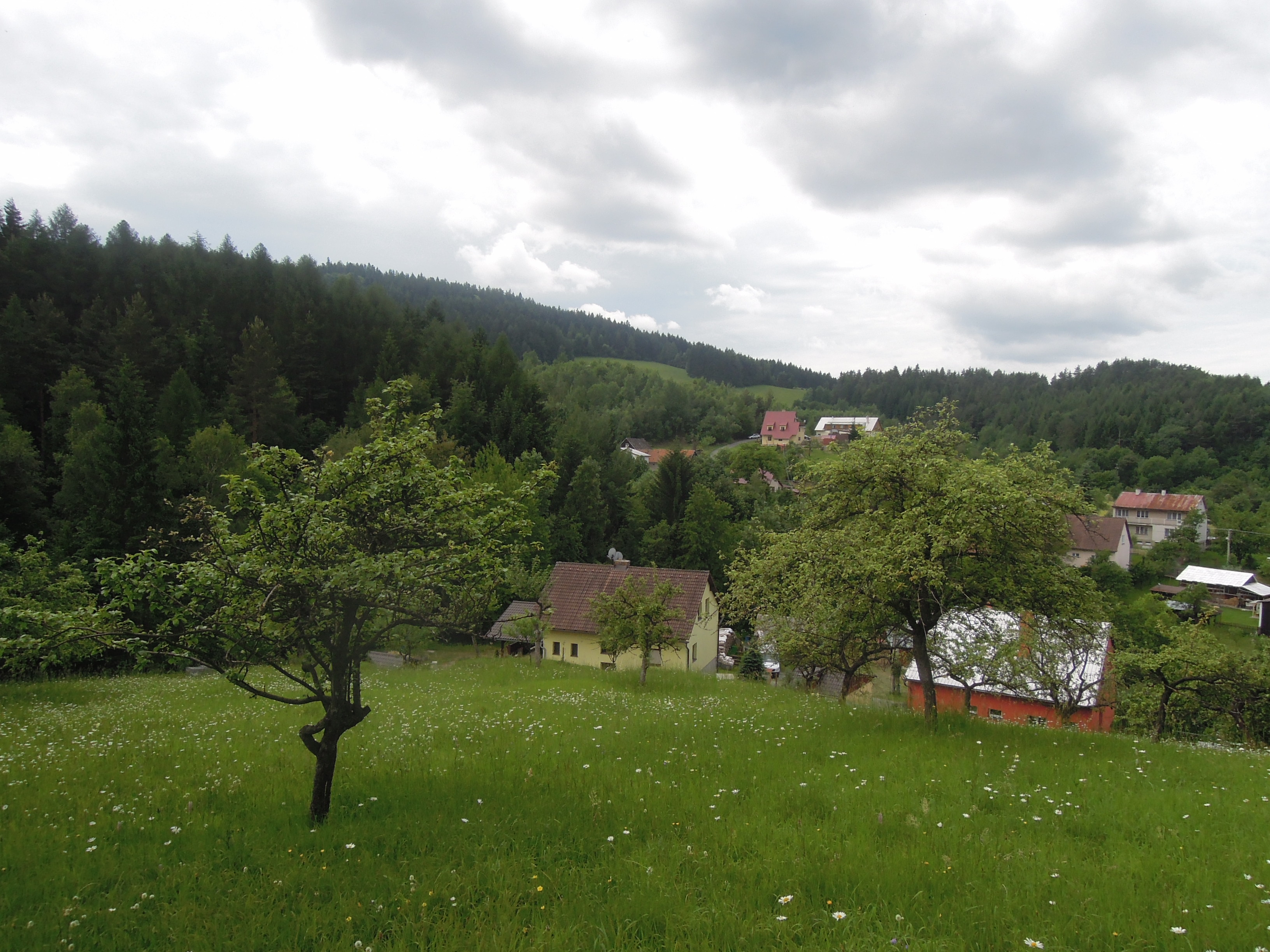
- Hrádek, a protected natural monument

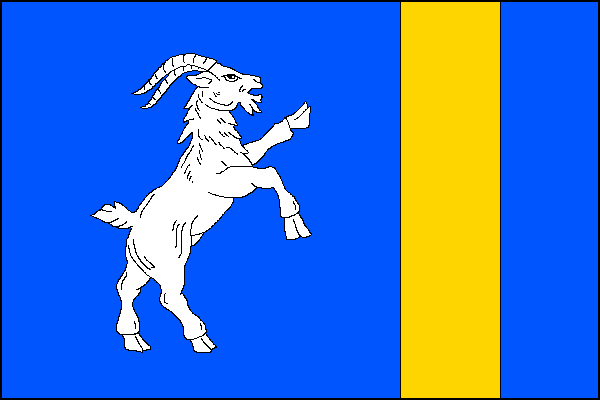
- Flag Coat of arms

- Location in the Czech Republic
- Coordinates: 49°9′45″N 18°4′59″E
- Country: Czech Republic
- Region: Zlín
- District: Zlín
- First mentioned: 1422

Area
  - Total: 9.42 km^{2} (3.64 sq mi)
- Elevation: 505 m (1,657 ft)

Population (2026-01-01)
  - Total: 478
  - Density: 50.7/km^{2} (131/sq mi)
- Time zone: UTC+1 (CET)
  - Summer (DST): UTC+2 (CEST)
- Postal code: 756 12
- Website: www.studlov.cz

Študlov is a municipality and village in Zlín District in the Zlín Region of the Czech Republic. It has about 500 inhabitants.

Študlov lies approximately 20 kilometres (12 mi) south of Vsetín, 30 km (19 mi) east of Zlín, and 284 km (176 mi) east of Prague.

== History ==
The first written mention of Študlov is from 1422.

From 1 January 2021, Študlov is no longer a part of Vsetín District and belongs to Zlín District.

== Demographics ==
Historical population
Year	Pop.	±%
1869	522	—
1880	527	+1.0%
1890	564	+7.0%
1900	583	+3.4%
1910	589	+1.0%
1921	603	+2.4%
1930	605	+0.3%
1950	572	−5.5%
1961	662	+15.7%
1970	609	−8.0%
1980	601	−1.3%
1991	500	−16.8%
2001	518	+3.6%
2011	500	−3.5%
2021	469	−6.2%
Source: Censuses
