= Josef Sousedík =

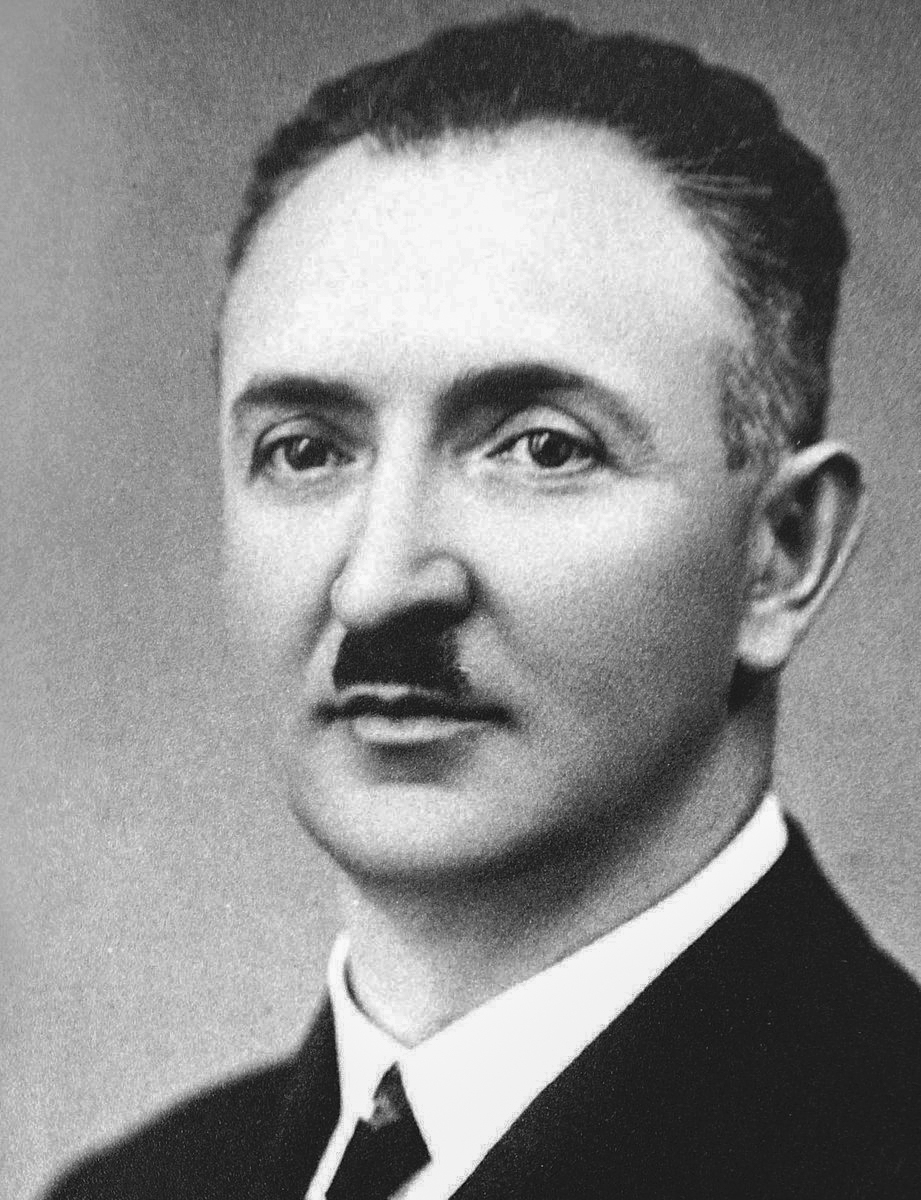
Josef Sousedík

Josef Sousedík (18 December 1894, Vsetín – 15 December 1944, Vsetín) was a Czech inventor, industrialist and resistance fighter.

== Life ==
Josef Sousedík grew up in a poor family in Vsetín in the Austro-Hungarian Empire. After finishing elementary school he trained as an electrician. He fought in the Austria-Hungary army during World War I and participated in the Battle of Slovakia in 1918. He opened his own workshop in 1919, using his patents and inventions. The workshop expanded into a factory employing over 200 people by 1934. The factory went bankrupt in 1934 during the Great Depression and was bought by Ringhoffer-Tatra, which employed Sousedík as a CEO.

He was twice elected mayor of Vsetín from 1927–1938.

Sousedík was an anti-Nazi resistance leader during World War II, collaborating with the Clay Eva group and the 1st Czechoslovak Partisan Brigade of Jan Žižka. He was arrested in 1944, and shot dead after a fight during an interrogation. Sousedík was decorated with the Czechoslovak War Cross in memoriam by Czechoslovak president Edvard Beneš.

The Communist dictatorship suppressed recognition of Sousedík's acts due to his collaboration with Western states and factory ownership.

== Inventions and products ==
Sousedík owned over 200 patents, mostly in the electrical field, such as an electrical rudder. His factory produced electrical parts for the ČSD Class M 290.0 and for the Tatra T86.
