= Lanžhot =

- Town
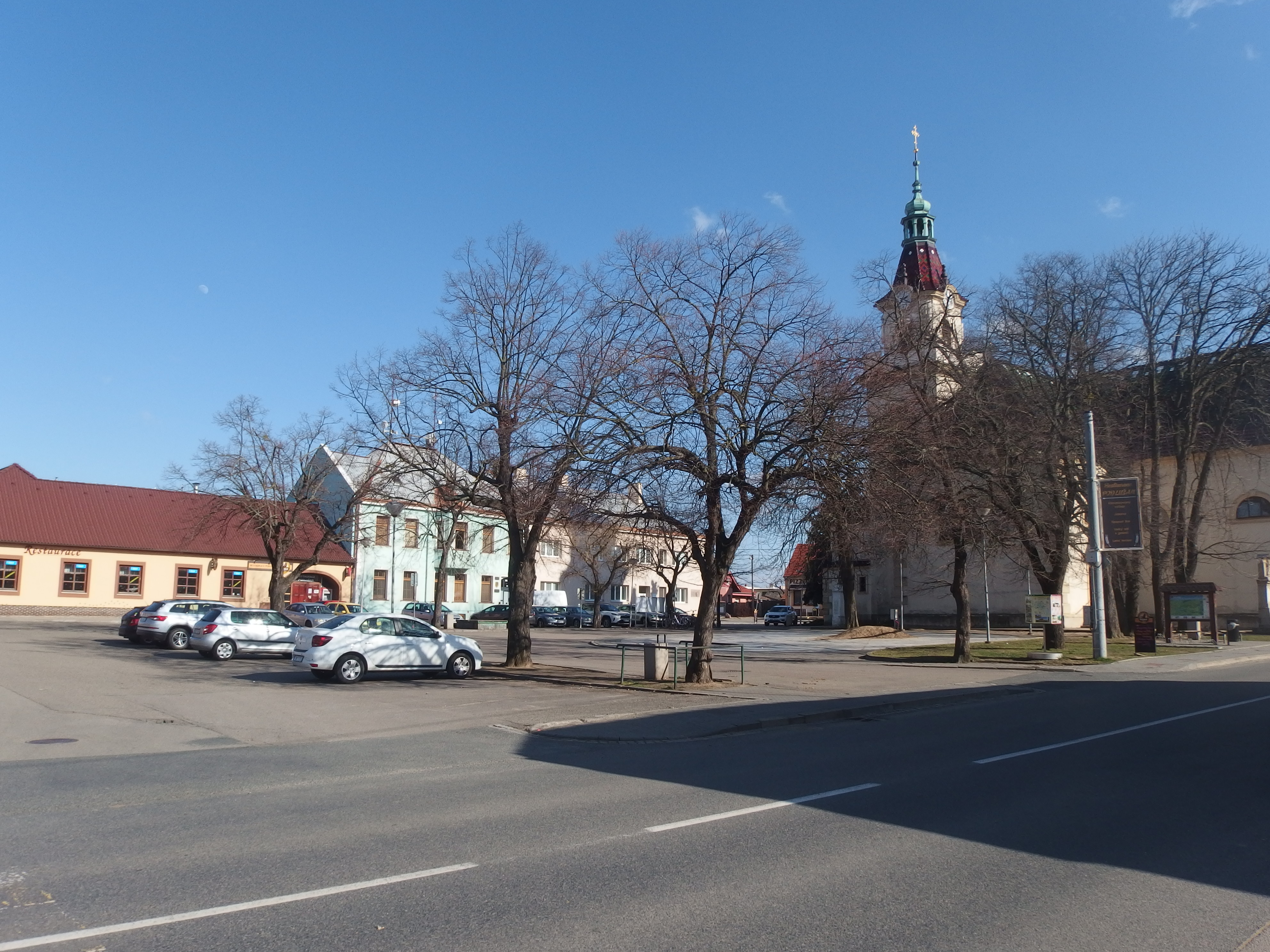
- Town square

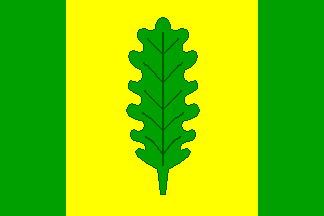
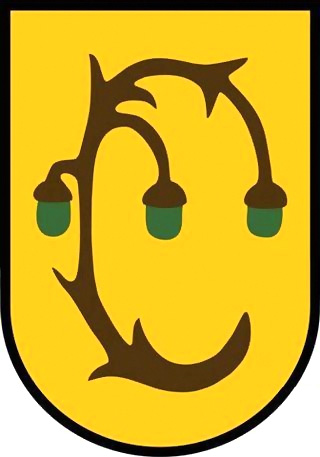
- Flag Coat of arms

- Location in the Czech Republic
- Coordinates: 48°43′28″N 16°58′0″E
- Country: Czech Republic
- Region: South Moravian
- District: Břeclav
- First mentioned: 1384

Government
  - Mayor: Ladislav Straka

Area
  - Total: 54.83 km^{2} (21.17 sq mi)
- Elevation: 164 m (538 ft)

Population (2026-01-01)
  - Total: 3,625
  - Density: 66.11/km^{2} (171.2/sq mi)
- Time zone: UTC+1 (CET)
  - Summer (DST): UTC+2 (CEST)
- Postal code: 691 51
- Website: www.lanzhot.cz

Lanžhot (Czech pronunciation: [ˈlanʒɦot]; German: Landshut) is a town in Břeclav District in the South Moravian Region of the Czech Republic. It has about 3,600 inhabitants. The town proper is located on the Kyjovka River in the Lower Morava Valley. Situated on the border with Austria and Slovakia, Lanžhot is the southernmost Moravian town.

== Etymology ==
The original Latin name Lanczhut and the German name Landshut meant 'land guard', referring to its location on the border between Austria and Kingdom of Hungary. The Czech name is transcription of the original name.

== Geography ==
Lanžhot is located about 7 kilometres (4 mi) southeast of Břeclav and 56 km (35 mi) southeast of Brno. It lies in the Lower Morava Valley. The municipal territory is located on the border with Austria and Slovakia.

The eastern border (with Slovakia) is formed by the Morava River and the western border (with Austria) is partly formed by the Thaya River. Their confluence forms the tripoint of the Czech Republic, Austria and Slovakia. Other notable watercourses in Lanžhot are the Kyjovka River (which joins the Thaya on the Czech–Austrian border) and the Svodnice Stream (which joins the Kyjovka near the town proper).

The area of the confluence of the Morava and Thaya, which also includes many pools, oxbow lakes and channels, is the most valuable ichthyological site in the country. About 80% of native Czech fish species can be found there, and 15% of them live only there.

== History ==
The first written mention of Lanžhot is from 1384.

== Demographics ==
Historical population

Year	Pop.	±%
1869	2,435	—
1880	2,700	+10.9%
1890	2,780	+3.0%
1900	2,972	+6.9%
1910	3,176	+6.9%

Year	Pop.	±%
1921	3,523	+10.9%
1930	3,882	+10.2%
1950	3,657	−5.8%
1961	3,996	+9.3%
1970	3,926	−1.8%

Year	Pop.	±%
1980	3,944	+0.5%
1991	3,753	−4.8%
2001	3,771	+0.5%
2011	3,653	−3.1%
2021	3,437	−5.9%

Source: Censuses

== Transport ==
The D2 motorway runs through Lanžhot. On the Czech–Slovak border are two road border crossings and one rail border crossing.

== Sights ==
The only protected cultural monuments in Lanžhot are two homesteads from the second half of the 20th century and a statue of a Red Army soldier from 1953.

The main landmark is the Church of the Exaltation of the Holy Cross. There was an old church, which was completely rebuilt in 1893. Only the sacristy, the chancel and the ascent to the bell tower remained from the old church.

== Notable people ==
- Edmund von Krieghammer (1832–1906), Austrian general
- Antonín Bartoš (1910–1998), soldier and resistance fighter

== Twin towns – sister cities ==
Lanžhot is twinned with:

- Rabensburg, Austria
