= Vsetín =

- Town
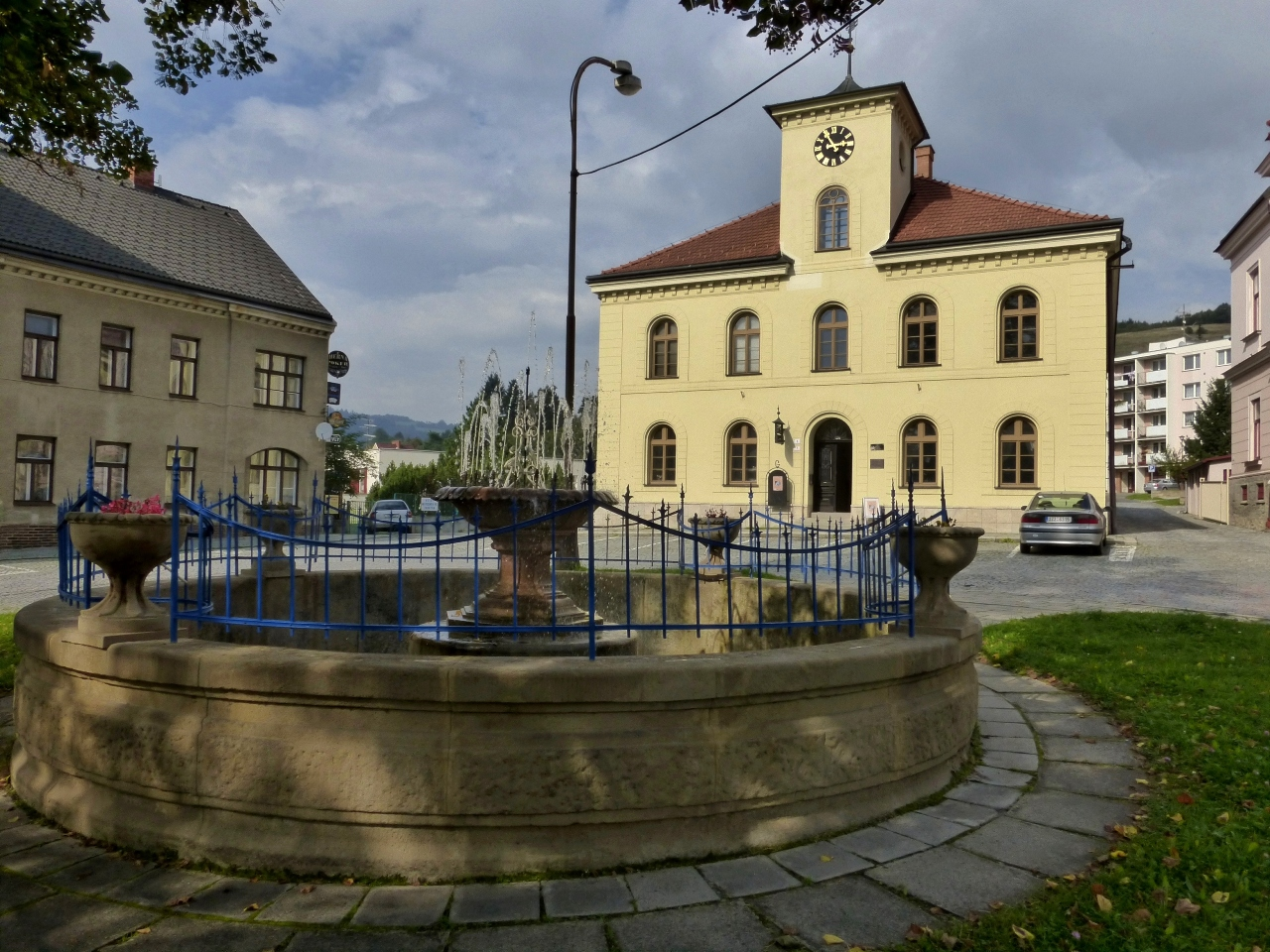
- Horní náměstí and the Old Town Hall

- Flag Coat of arms

- Location in the Czech Republic
- Coordinates: 49°20′19″N 17°59′46″E
- Country: Czech Republic
- Region: Zlín
- District: Vsetín
- First mentioned: 1308

Government
  - Mayor: Martin Metelka

Area
  - Total: 57.61 km^{2} (22.24 sq mi)
- Elevation: 342 m (1,122 ft)

Population (2026-01-01)
  - Total: 24,974
  - Density: 433.5/km^{2} (1,123/sq mi)
- Time zone: UTC+1 (CET)
  - Summer (DST): UTC+2 (CEST)
- Postal code: 755 01
- Website: www.mestovsetin.cz

Vsetín (Czech pronunciation: [ˈfsɛciːn]) is a town in the Zlín Region of the Czech Republic. It has about 25,000 inhabitants. It is located in the Hostýn-Vsetín Mountains on the Vsetínská Bečva River.

The most important noble owners of Vsetín were the Counts of Illésházy, who ruled the town for almost 180 years. Originally a small town, Vsetín has become an important centre of industrial, economic, cultural and sporting life during the 20th century. The main landmark of the town is the Renaissance Vsetín Castle.

== Administrative division ==
Vsetín consists of three municipal parts (in brackets population according to the 2021 census):

- Vsetín (20,421)
- Horní Jasenka (780)
- Rokytnice (3,757)

== Etymology ==
The name Vsetín was derived from the personal Slavic name Vsata, Seta, Sěntoslav or Svatoslav. It was probably the name of a man who was tasked with deforesting the area and establishing the first fields. The initial form of the settlement's name was Setteinz. The name Vsetín (in the oldest documents written as Wssetin) has been used since 1396 at the latest.

== Geography ==
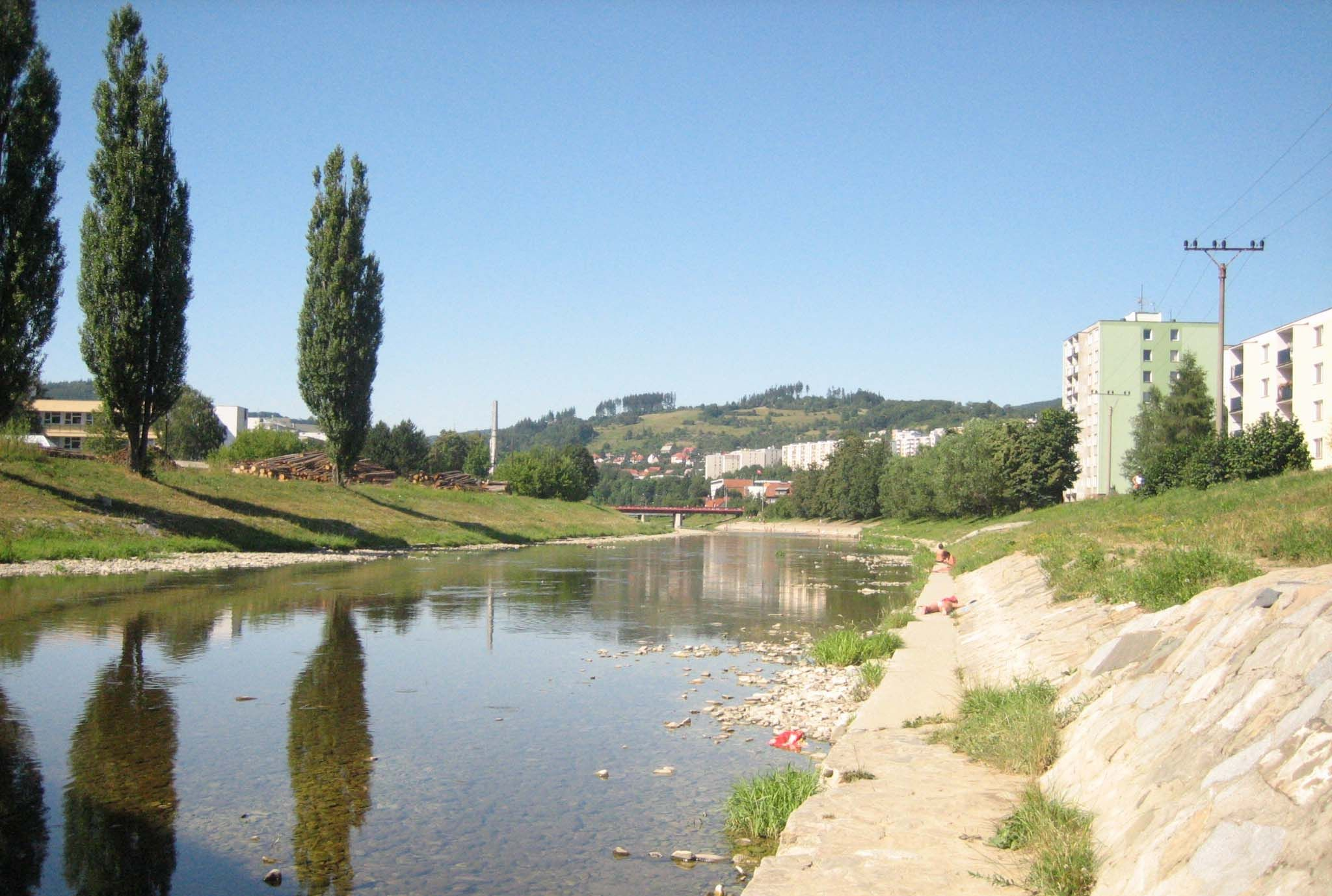
Vsetínská Bečva flowing through Vsetín

Vsetín is located about 25 kilometres (16 mi) northeast of Zlín and 54 km (34 mi) west of Žilina in Slovakia. It lies in a hilly landscape of the Hostýn-Vsetín Mountains. The highest point is the Cáb mountain at 841 m (2,759 ft) above sea level, which is located on the eastern border of the municipal territory.

Vsetín is situated in the valley of the Vsetínská Bečva River. The village of Rokytnice lies on the Rokytenka Stream, which flows into the Vsetínská Bečva in the centre of the town. Overall, the landscape is rich in small watercourses.

=== Climate ===
Vsetín's climate is classified as humid continental climate (Köppen: Dfb; Trewartha: Dcbo). Among them, the annual average temperature is 8.2 °C (46.8 °F), the hottest month in July is 18.1 °C (64.6 °F), and the coldest month is −1.8 °C (28.8 °F) in January. The annual precipitation is 836.8 millimetres (32.94 in), of which July is the wettest with 103.7 millimetres (4.08 in), while February is the driest with only 53.2 millimetres (2.09 in). The extreme temperature throughout the year ranged from −37.0 °C (−34.6 °F) on 11 February 1929 to 37.0 °C (98.6 °F) on 15 August 1952.

Climate data for Vsetín, 1991–2020 normals, extremes 1900–present
Month	Jan	Feb	Mar	Apr	May	Jun	Jul	Aug	Sep	Oct	Nov	Dec	Year
Record high °C (°F)	14.1 (57.4)	19.2 (66.6)	23.4 (74.1)	28.8 (83.8)	31.1 (88.0)	35.0 (95.0)	36.8 (98.2)	37.0 (98.6)	32.5 (90.5)	26.4 (79.5)	21.1 (70.0)	15.1 (59.2)	37.0 (98.6)
Mean daily maximum °C (°F)	1.5 (34.7)	3.6 (38.5)	8.3 (46.9)	15.1 (59.2)	19.5 (67.1)	23.1 (73.6)	25.2 (77.4)	25.2 (77.4)	19.5 (67.1)	13.8 (56.8)	7.7 (45.9)	2.4 (36.3)	13.7 (56.7)
Daily mean °C (°F)	−1.8 (28.8)	−0.6 (30.9)	2.8 (37.0)	8.2 (46.8)	12.8 (55.0)	16.5 (61.7)	18.1 (64.6)	17.5 (63.5)	12.7 (54.9)	8.4 (47.1)	4.2 (39.6)	−0.5 (31.1)	8.2 (46.8)
Mean daily minimum °C (°F)	−5.1 (22.8)	−4.2 (24.4)	−1.4 (29.5)	2.5 (36.5)	7.1 (44.8)	10.7 (51.3)	12.3 (54.1)	12.0 (53.6)	8.3 (46.9)	4.6 (40.3)	1.2 (34.2)	−3.3 (26.1)	3.7 (38.7)
Record low °C (°F)	−32.8 (−27.0)	−37.0 (−34.6)	−24.0 (−11.2)	−14.2 (6.4)	−4.5 (23.9)	−3.4 (25.9)	2.1 (35.8)	1.8 (35.2)	−4.1 (24.6)	−11.6 (11.1)	−19.5 (−3.1)	−29.0 (−20.2)	−37.0 (−34.6)
Average precipitation mm (inches)	54.0 (2.13)	53.2 (2.09)	56.6 (2.23)	54.6 (2.15)	85.0 (3.35)	87.9 (3.46)	103.7 (4.08)	82.8 (3.26)	80.1 (3.15)	65.1 (2.56)	54.8 (2.16)	59.0 (2.32)	836.8 (32.94)
Average snowfall cm (inches)	32.5 (12.8)	32.8 (12.9)	14.9 (5.9)	3.7 (1.5)	0.0 (0.0)	0.0 (0.0)	0.0 (0.0)	0.0 (0.0)	0.0 (0.0)	0.7 (0.3)	11.3 (4.4)	26.8 (10.6)	122.6 (48.3)
Average relative humidity (%)	85.6	81.6	77.2	71.2	73.2	73.5	73.7	76.2	81.3	82.8	84.3	86.4	78.9
Mean monthly sunshine hours	51.1	72.1	124.8	177.0	198.5	211.1	219.1	216.1	154.5	106.1	56.0	45.5	1,631.9
Source: Czech Hydrometeorological Institute

== History ==
=== 14th–16th centuries ===
The first written mention of the area around the Bečva river is from 1297, when Vsetín did not yet exist. The first written mention of Vsetín is from 1308, when it was owned by Knights Templar who rented it to Lord Vok of Kravaře. It was described as a small town with a church, a mill and the Freudsberg Castle, and further colonisation of the area was described. In following decades, Vsetín was held by many noble families. The most significant were the Lords of Cimburk, Lords of Svätý Jur and Pezinok, Lords of Kunštát, Lords of Šelmberk, and the Pernštejn family. A fortress was built in what is today the square Horní náměstí in the first half of the 15th century.

=== 17th–18th centuries ===
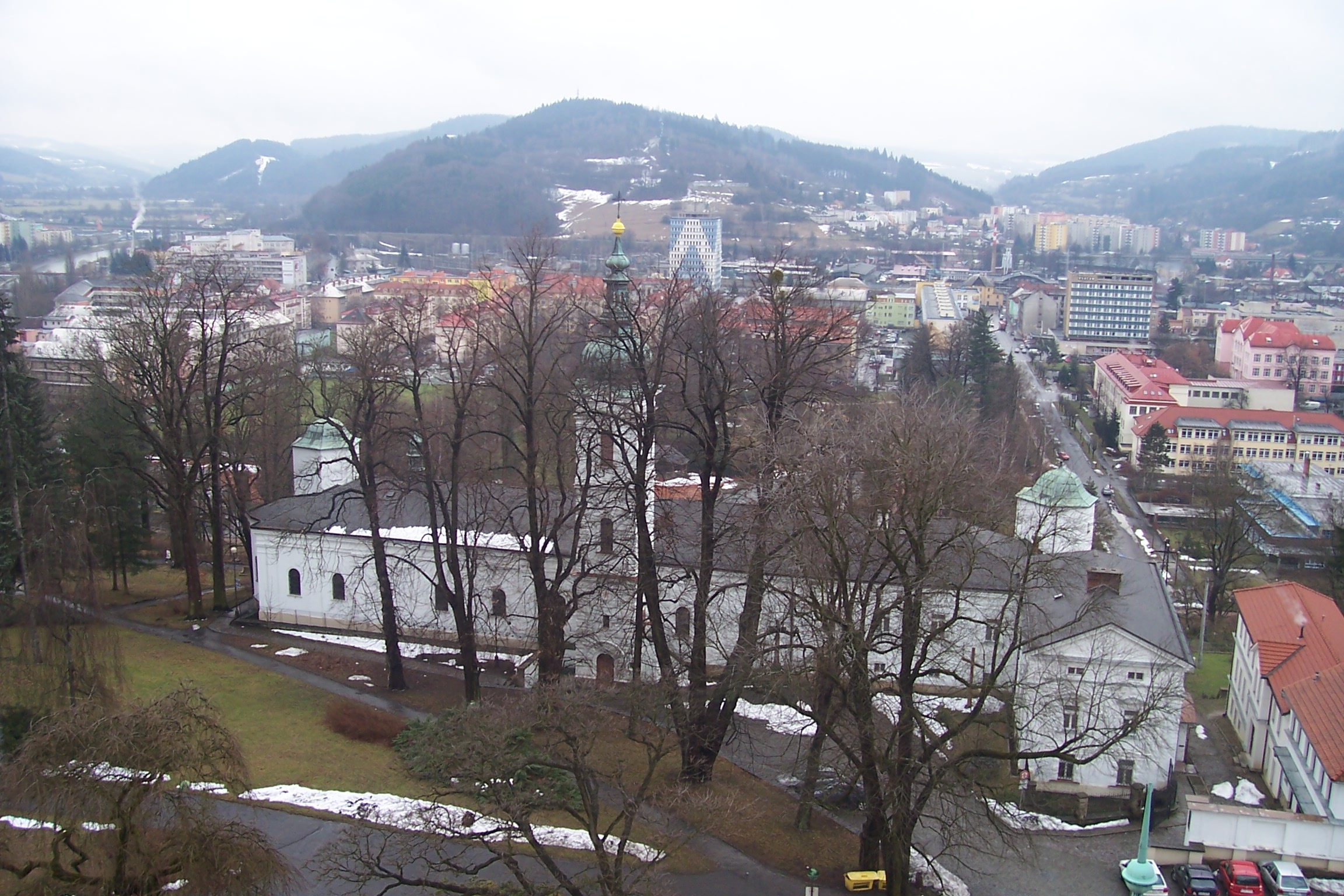
View from the north with Church of the Assumption of the Virgin Mary

In 1609, Vsetín was acquired by marriage by Albrecht von Wallenstein. He brought Jesuits to the Vsetín estate and started a re-Catholicisation among serfs. Religious and economic oppression led to resistance and long-term rebellions of the serfs during the Thirty Years' War. The serfs joined the Swedish army in the war and Vsetín became their centre. In 1627, Vsetín was burned down and many people were executed, but the rebels were not defeated until 1644. About 200 participants of the rebellion were executed in Vsetín and it remains one of the most dreadful in the nation's history. Vsetín and villages in a wide surrounding area were burned.

During the Thirty Years' War, Vsetín extended from the original so-called Upper Town to the pastures spread out on the left bank of the Bečva river, where a manor mill already stood since the 15th century. Families of refugees from surrounding towns, mainly from Valašské Meziříčí, dramatically affected by war, settled there and founded a settlement called Lower Town. In 1647, Lower Town became an autonomous municipality, having only the Vogt in common with the current Vsetín. The Upper and Lower Towns often argued about things like taxes, land and markets.

Between 1663 and 1683, Vsetín was devastated by the Turkish and Tartarish raids, followed by Hungarian rebels. In 1708 the town was most affected as Hungarian rebels burned it almost to the ground, including the castle. It took decades for Vsetín to recover from that damage.

In 1653, Vsetín became the property of a Hungarian noble family, the Counts of Illésházy, who owned it for almost 180 years and had the most profound impact on its development. During the era of Jan of Illésházy in the second half of the 18th century, bloody rebellions of the Protestants repeated. It was not until the Patent of Toleration issued in 1781 when the situation cooled down.

=== 19th century ===
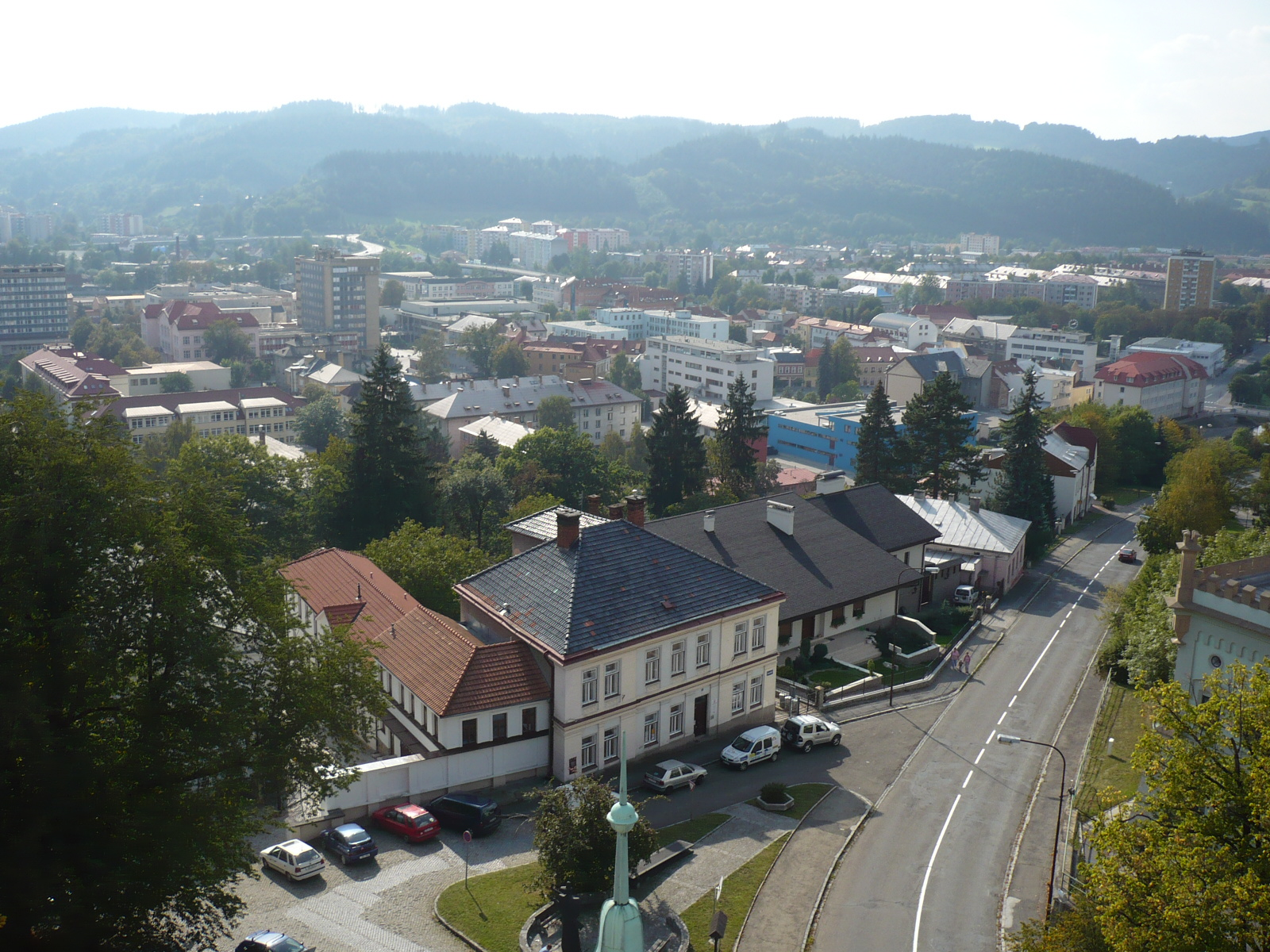
View from the south

In 1849, the Upper and Lower Towns merged. In the first half of 19th century, Vsetín and the surrounding area were influenced by the Industrial Revolution, bringing into use the vast stock of wood in the surrounding beech and fir forests. A sugar factory, a steam saw mill, a factory producing matches and a glassworks were founded in 1868 and were the first factories in Vsetín. In the late 19th century, Vsetín became an important centre of industrial production of bent-wood furniture in the factories of Jacob & Josef Kohn and Gebrüder Thonet, which belonged to the top companies of the world for this type of furniture.

In 1885, the town was linked to an inland railway system, followed by the construction of schools, a hospital, a power plant, water mains and other public facilities. Tomáš Garrigue Masaryk, who was a representative of East Moravian towns in the Imperial Council at that time, also contributed to the construction of some of these constructions.

=== 20th century ===
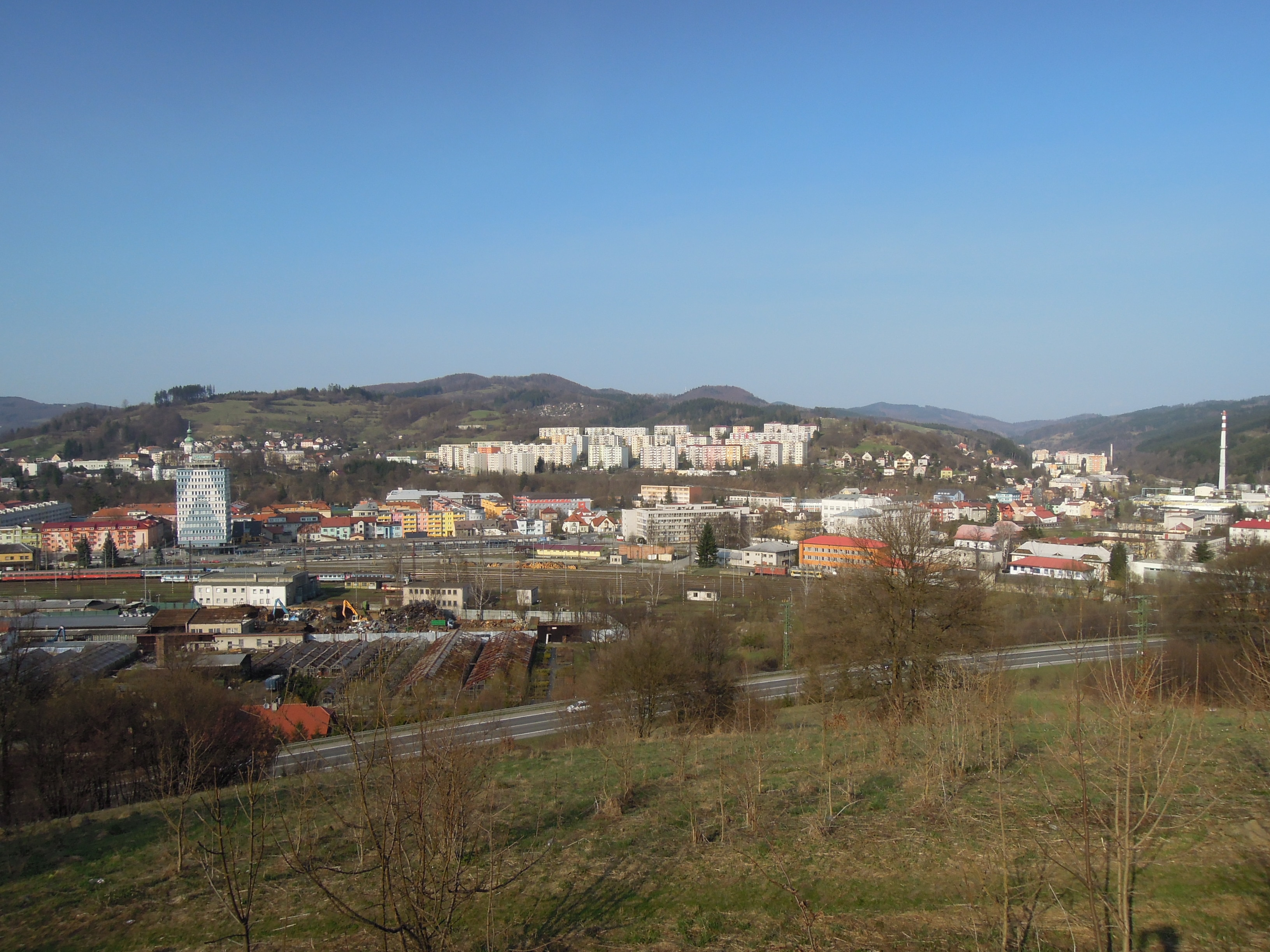
View of Vsetín from Rokytnice

In 1909, Vsetín became a district town and its importance grew in parallel with its economic boom. The furniture industry declined during the world economic crisis in the 1930s, followed by the limitation of production in other industrial companies. That situation resulted in a high level of unemployment in the area. This changed in 1937 with the construction of a new factory of the firearm producer Zbrojovka Brno. However, at that time Vsetín was already known for its production of electric engines in the Josef Sousedík factory.

During World War II, mainly due to military production, the number of inhabitants doubled, reaching 14,000. New inhabitants were mainly represented by employees from Zbrojovka who came from Brno. During the war, several resistance groups were successively established, out of which J. Sousedík was one of the most significant. Its members initiated collaboration with the Clay group connected with the exiled government in London and later with the 1st Czechoslovak Partisan Brigade of Jan Žižka which crossed the Moravian border at times of the Slovak National Uprising. Vsetín was liberated on 4 May 1945 by forces of the 1st Czechoslovak Army led by General Karel Klapálek.

Post-war development of the town was influenced for many years by its fast growth during the war. The town experienced a considerable shortage of flats, shops, school premises and medical centres. Its orientation on the development of heavy industry and military production resulted in the closing down of a series of smaller industrial companies. In connection with communist political development after February 1948, private trade successively declined.

The problems connected with the growth of the town are reflected mainly in the area of the construction of housing estates and the school system. The 1960 initiation of massive construction of panel housing estates in the outlying parts of the town only represented a partial solution to the problem. Between 1960 and 1990 the number of inhabitants in the town almost doubled. The peak was reached in 1991, when Vsetín had almost 30,000 inhabitants.

== Demographics ==
Historical population

Year	Pop.	±%
1869	5,107	—
1880	6,061	+18.7%
1890	7,869	+29.8%
1900	8,869	+12.7%
1910	10,123	+14.1%

Year	Pop.	±%
1921	9,382	−7.3%
1930	9,727	+3.7%
1950	16,625	+70.9%
1961	18,213	+9.6%
1970	22,108	+21.4%

Year	Pop.	±%
1980	27,932	+26.3%
1991	29,661	+6.2%
2001	29,190	−1.6%
2011	26,638	−8.7%
2021	24,958	−6.3%

Source: Censuses

== Economy ==
Vsetín is an industrial town with several large companies. The largest industrial employer based in the town is Kayaku Safety Systems Europe (part of the Nippon Kayaku Group), producer of safety systems for automotive industry.

Other significant industrial companies are Austin Detonator (part of Austin Powder Company), one of the largest world manufacturers of detonators founded in 1953 in the premises of the former Zbrojovka factory, WOCO STV, manufacturer of parts for motor vehicles founded in 1956, and Servis Climax and Stín Kovo, both manufacturers of window blinds.

== Transport ==
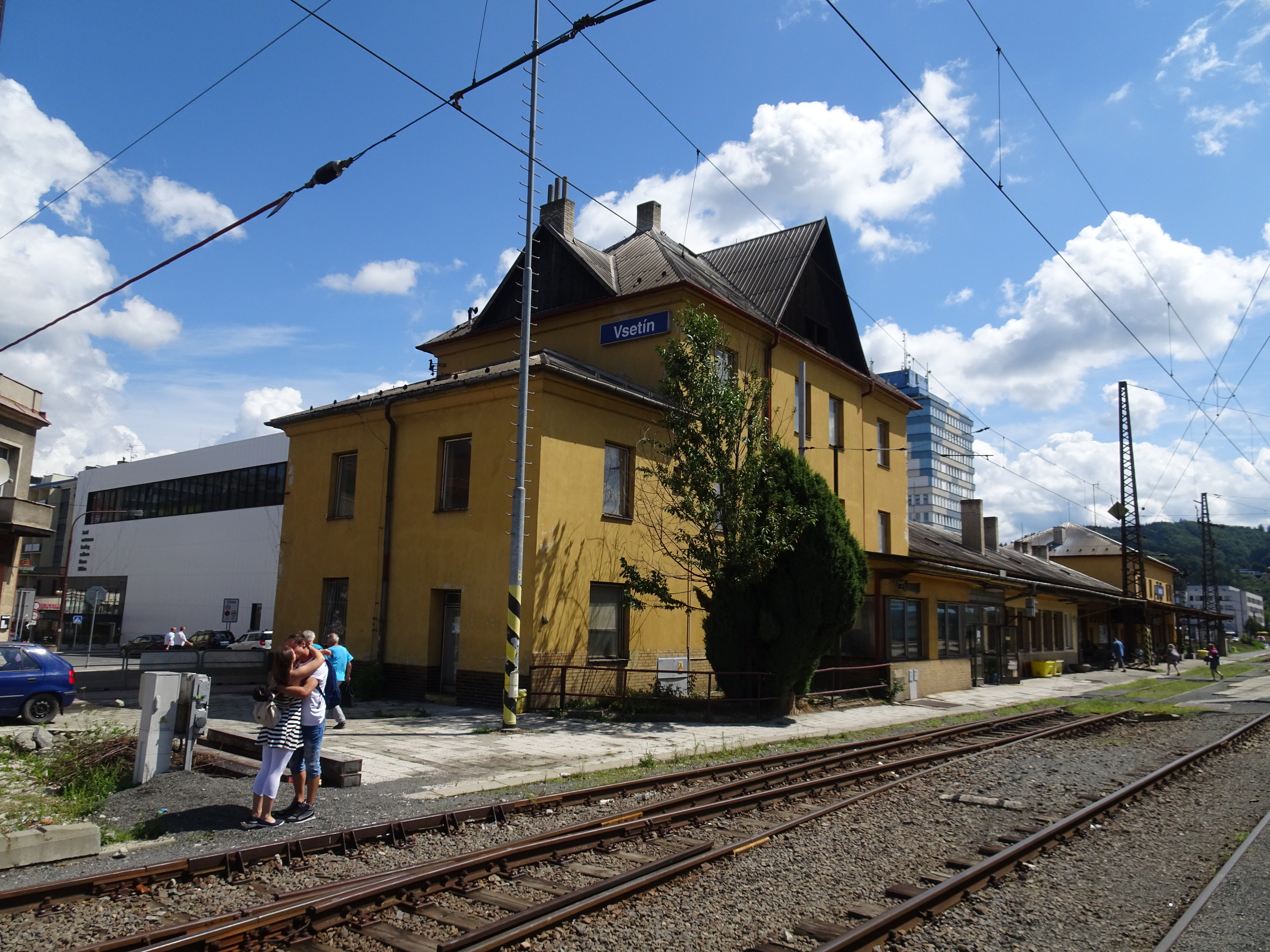
Train station

The I/57 road (the section from Nový Jičín to the Czech–Slovak border in Brumov-Bylnice) runs through the town. The I/69 road splits from it and connects Vsetín with Vizovice.

Vsetín is located on the major railway line Prague–Púchov. It is also the start of lines to Hranice, Velké Karlovice and Střelná.

== Culture ==
Vsetín lies in the cultural region of Moravian Wallachia. The folk culture has been kept alive by Wallachian song and dance groups for many decades.

In the summer of 1949, Wallachian towns and municipalities organised an important local exhibition called Wallachia at Work. Since 1999, that exhibition has been commemorated by organising a multi-genre festival called Valašské záření ('Wallachian shining').

== Sport ==
The town is home to VHK Vsetín, throughout the 1990s the most successful ice hockey team in the country, winning the National League six times. However, the team was disbanded in 2007 and re-established in 2008 in the third tier. Since 2017, the club has been plying in the second tier of the Czech ice hockey competition.

== Sights ==
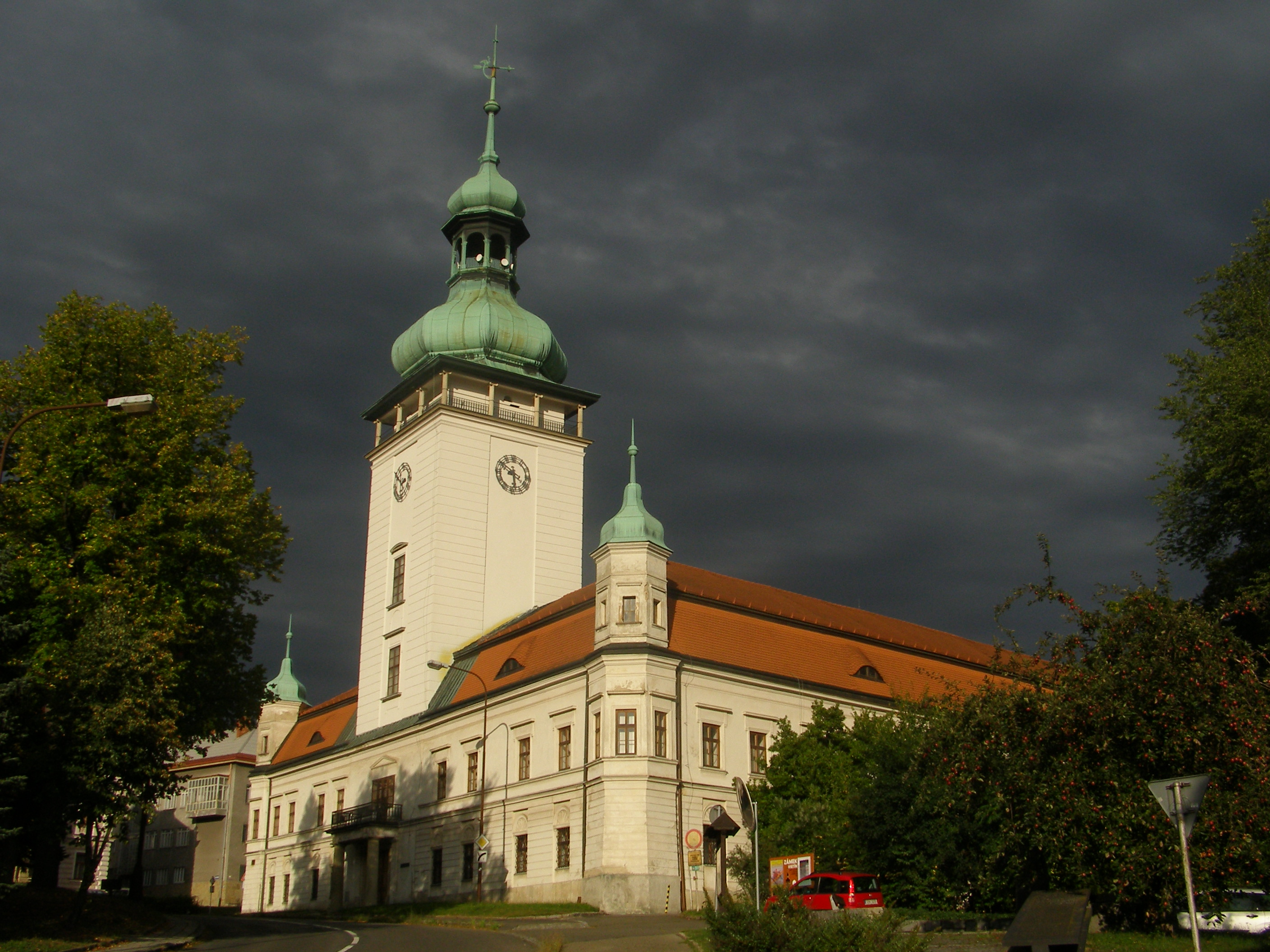
Vsetín Castle

The historical centre is formed by the square Horní náměstí and its surroundings. On the square is located several monuments, including Vsetín Castle, Old Town Hall and New Town Hall.

The Vsetín Castle with its high tower is the main landmark of the town and the oldest historical building. The Renaissance castle was built between 1600 and 1610 on the site of the old fortress. In 1708, it was destroyed by a fire and was rebuilt several times. The current Neoclassical appearance of the castle is from the reconstruction in 1833–1834. In the 20th century, the castle served as the seat of various institutions and was damaged. After repairs, it was opened to the public in 1975 and still serves as a major regional cultural and social centre. It houses the Regional Museum of Moravian Wallachia, which was founded in 1924.

The Old Town Hall was built in 1720–1721. It was rebuilt in 1850 and the tower was added. Today the house serves as a gallery and ceremonial hall. The New Town Hall was built in the Neorenaissance style in 1898–1899 and today houses a hotel.

The Church of the Assumption of the Virgin Mary is an atypical Baroque church building from the end of the 17th century. It was originally built as a castle for Count Jiří Illésházy, who dedicated the unfinished construction to the Catholic Church, after the old wooden church was burned down in 1683. It was consecrated in 1689. During alterations in the 19th century, the church tower was finished with an onion-shaped dome with three new bells.

== Notable people ==
- Josef Sousedík (1894–1944), inventor, industrialist and resistance fighter
- Evžen Erban (1912–1994), politician
- Jarmila Šuláková (1929–2017), folk singer
- Miroslav Tetter (1938–2021), politician and academic
- Eliška Balzerová (born 1949), actress
- Mirek Topolánek (born 1956), politician, Prime Minister in 2006–2009
- Jiří Čunek (born 1959), politician, mayor of Vsetín; lives here
- Roman Vojtek (born 1972), actor
- Václav Varaďa (born 1976), ice hockey player
- Roman Hubník (born 1984), footballer
- Linda Nosková (born 2004), tennis player

== Twin towns – sister cities ==
Vsetín is twinned with:

- Bytom, Poland
- Mödling, Austria
- Stará Ľubovňa, Slovakia
- Trenčianske Teplice, Slovakia
- Vrgorac, Croatia
