= Hostišová =

- Municipality
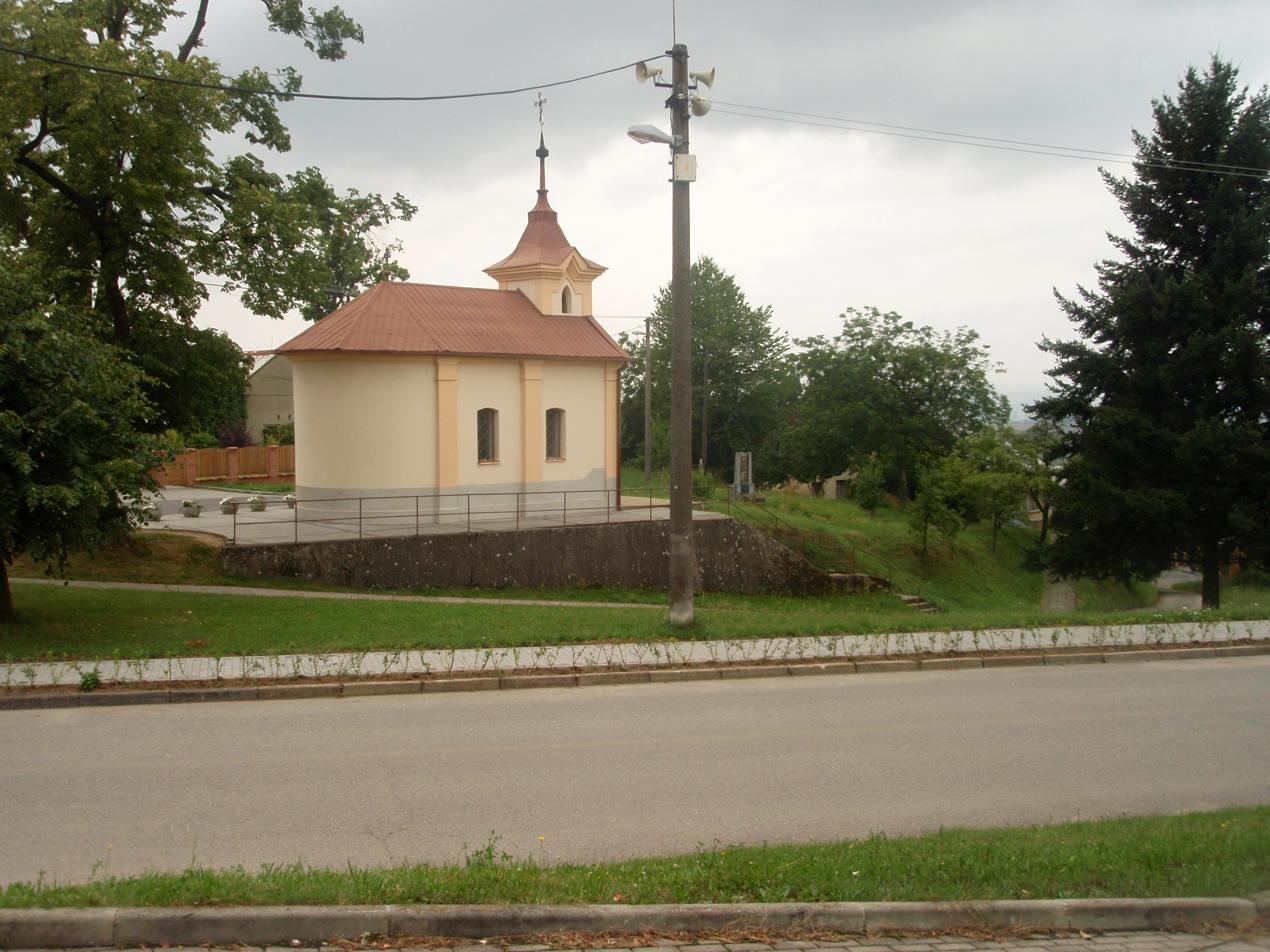
- Centre of Hostišová with a chapel

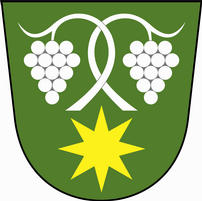
- Flag Coat of arms

- Location in the Czech Republic
- Coordinates: 49°15′13″N 17°35′28″E
- Country: Czech Republic
- Region: Zlín
- District: Zlín
- First mentioned: 1397

Area
  - Total: 2.65 km^{2} (1.02 sq mi)
- Elevation: 308 m (1,010 ft)

Population (2026-01-01)
  - Total: 570
  - Density: 220/km^{2} (560/sq mi)
- Time zone: UTC+1 (CET)
  - Summer (DST): UTC+2 (CEST)
- Postal code: 763 01
- Website: www.hostisova.cz

Hostišová is a municipality and village in Zlín District in the Zlín Region of the Czech Republic. It has about 600 inhabitants.

== Administrative division ==
Hostišová consists of two municipal parts (in brackets population according to the 2021 census):

- Hostišová (287)
- Hostišová-Horňák (243)

== Geography ==
Hostišová is located about 5 kilometres (3 mi) northwest of Zlín. It lies in a hilly landscape in the Vizovice Highlands. The highest point is the Strážná hill at 347 m (1,138 ft) above sea level; the village is located on its slopes.

== History ==
The first written mention of Hostišová is from 1397.

== Demographics ==
Historical population

Year	Pop.	±%
1869	175	—
1880	230	+31.4%
1890	254	+10.4%
1900	246	−3.1%
1910	289	+17.5%

Year	Pop.	±%
1921	300	+3.8%
1930	302	+0.7%
1950	350	+15.9%
1961	377	+7.7%
1970	383	+1.6%

Year	Pop.	±%
1980	350	−8.6%
1991	387	+10.6%
2001	410	+5.9%
2011	460	+12.2%
2021	530	+15.2%

Source: Censuses

== Transport ==
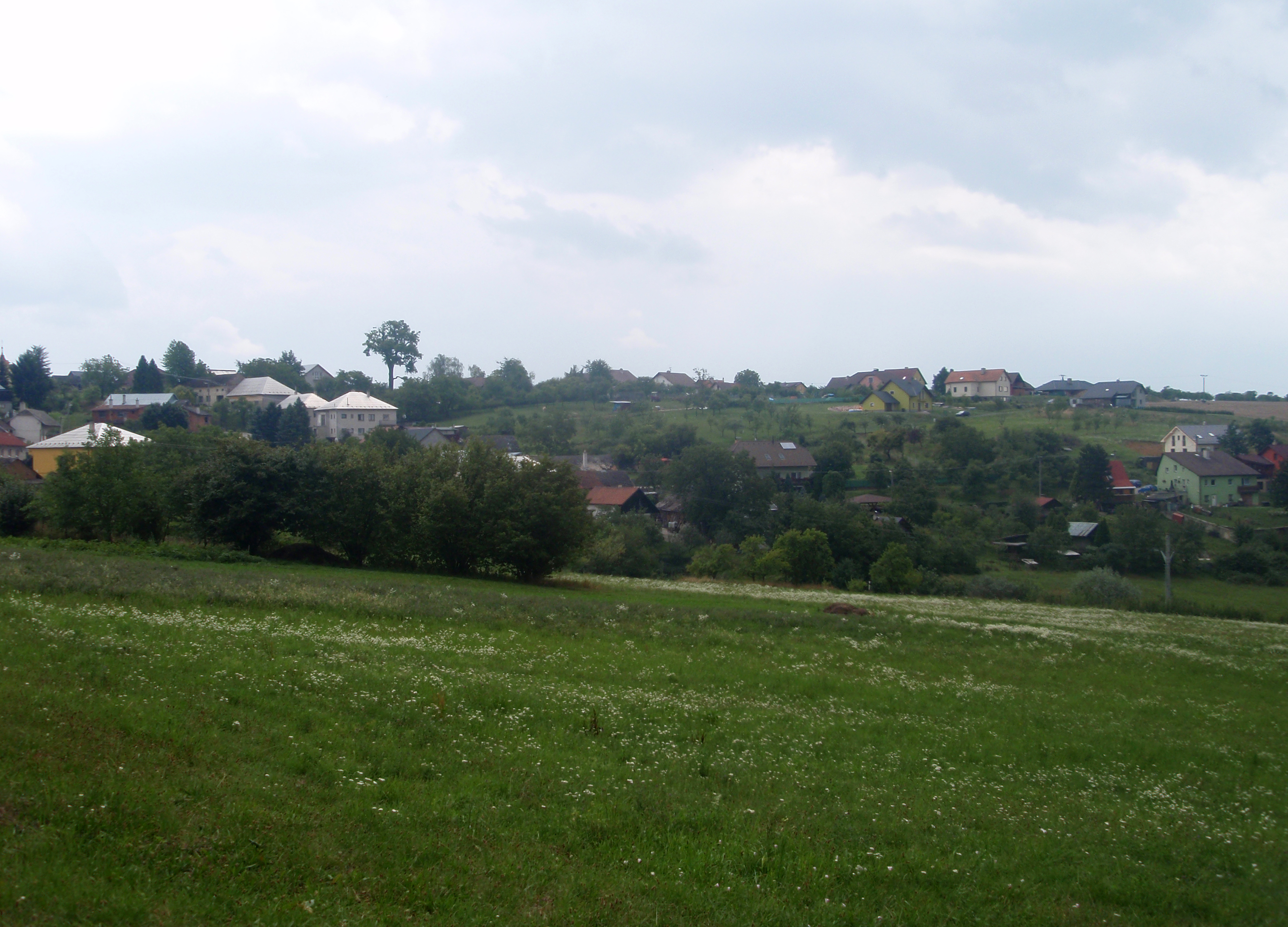
General view

There are no railways or major roads passing through the municipality.

== Sights ==
The main landmark is the Chapel of the Visitation of the Virgin Mary from 1869.

An observation tower called Na Strážné is located on the top of the Strážná hill. It is a 14 m (46 ft) high wooden tower on a stone base.
