= Jeremy Corbyn 2015 Labour Party leadership campaign =

British political campaign

Jeremy Corbyn for Labour Leader
- Campaign: 2015 Labour Party leadership election
- Candidate: Jeremy Corbyn MP
- Status: Announced: 3 June 2015; Nominated: 15 June 2015; Won election: 12 September 2015
- Headquarters: Walkden House, 10 Melton St, Kings Cross, Camden, London, NW1 2EJ
- Key people: Simon Fletcher (Manager); John McDonnell MP (Parliamentary Manager); Carmel Nolan (Communications); Jon Lansman (Director of Operations)
- Slogan(s): Straight Talking, Honest Politics
- Chant: "Jez We Can"

Jeremy Corbyn, the Member of Parliament for Islington North, stood as a candidate in the 2015 British Labour Party leadership election, in a successful campaign that made him the leader of the Labour Party.

His campaign was announced in an article for the Islington Tribune on 3 June 2015. Corbyn pledged to stand on a "clear anti-austerity platform" and because he wanted to "give Labour Party members a voice" in the debate.

Commentators in the media widely predicted that Corbyn would struggle to pass the threshold of 35 nominations from Labour MPs required to become a candidate. However, he managed narrowly—and at the last minute—to secure sufficient support from parliamentary colleagues, with 36 nominations in total. Around 12 of the MPs who nominated him actually supported other candidates, but "lent" him their support in order to widen the contest. Corbyn was reported to say: "We had two minutes to spare, it was easy."

He was originally seen as a rank-outsider, given odds of 200/1 to win by bookmakers in June 2015. However, following a series of televised and radio debates with the other three candidates, Andy Burnham, Yvette Cooper and Liz Kendall, Corbyn received the highest number of supporting nominations from Constituency Labour Parties, winning over 100 by the end of July. Corbyn went on to gain the support of six of the Labour Party's fourteen affiliated trade unions, including the UK's two largest trade unions, Unite and UNISON.

On 12 September 2015 Corbyn was elected Leader of the Labour Party in a landslide victory, with 59.5% of first-preference votes.

== Economic policy ==
Corbyn's proposed economic policies, referred to as "Corbynomics" by some in the media, are reported to be "heavy influenced" from a blog created by political economist Richard Murphy. Corbyn's economic platform has been endorsed by a number of prominent economists, including David Blanchflower, a former member of the Bank of England's monetary policy committee, and Steve Keen. They were among 41 academics who signed a letter to The Guardian which argued: "The accusation is widely made that Jeremy Corbyn and his supporters have moved to the extreme left on economic policy. But this is not supported by the candidate's statements or policies. His opposition to austerity is actually mainstream economics, even backed by the conservative International Monetary Fund". The Nobel-Prize-winning economist Joseph Stiglitz said he was unsurprised at support for anti-austerity campaigners like Corbyn following the "disappointment" of policies pursued by New Labour. Robert Skidelsky offered a qualified endorsement of Corbyn's proposals to carry out QE through a National Investment Bank.

Corbyn's economic proposals have received some criticism, namely from the economist John Van Reenen at the London School of Economics, the BBC Economics Editor Robert Peston The Economist, the Financial Times The Daily Telegraph, the free-market Centre for Policy Studies, Shadow Chancellor Chris Leslie, former Foreign Secretary David Miliband, Shadow Business Secretary Chuka Umunna and the three other leadership candidates.

=== Investment ===
Corbyn proposed to have the Bank of England create money to invest in housing and public transport, described by Corbyn as "people's quantitative easing". This would aim to turn the UK into a high-skill, high-tech economy and to build more council houses in order to lower long-term housing benefit costs. To achieve this, the Bank would purchase bonds for a state-owned "National Investment Bank".

Opponents have claimed it would increase the risk of investing in the UK, meaning that the government would have to pay higher interest rates on its debt. It would also clash with Article 123 of the EU's Lisbon Treaty, which prevents central banks from printing money to finance government spending, and could cause a legal battle with the European Court of Justice.

=== Nationalisation ===
In an interview with The Independent on Sunday on 9 August 2015, Corbyn said: "I think we should talk about what the objectives of the party are, whether that's restoring Clause IV as it was originally written or it's a different one. But we shouldn't shy away from public participation, public investment in industry and public control of the railways." The Independent has cited opinion polls to suggest that many of Corbyn's policies, such as the renationalisation of railways and energy companies, have polled popularly with the general public.

Corbyn claims renationalisation would save money by both joining up a fragmented market, thereby reducing duplication in the privatised rail market (estimated by Ian Taylor as costing up to £1.2 billion in a 2012 report) and keeping what is currently profit for the energy and train operating companies. Both the energy and the train operating companies claim that they make a low return on their money (3.9% for the energy companies and 3.4% for the train companies) and a City analysis cited by The Guardian and Financial Times newspapers, of the nationalisation policies advocated by Corbyn, indicates a figure of at least £124 billion would be needed to purchase controlling shares in the "Big Six" national energy providers plus the National Grid.

=== Taxation ===
In June 2015, Corbyn set out his plan for "tax justice", which included a more progressive tax system, raising the top rate of income tax, finding up to £120 billion which he claims is lost through tax avoidance and evasion, by investing £1 billion in HMRC, and reducing the £93 billion which companies receive in tax relief according to Kevin Farnsworth, a senior lecturer from York University, an amount including railway and energy subsidies, regional development grants, relief on investment and government procurement from the private sector.

Jolyon Maugham QC, who had previously advised Ed Miliband on tax policy, criticised the plans and claimed to have found a £100 billion "black hole".

== Domestic policy ==
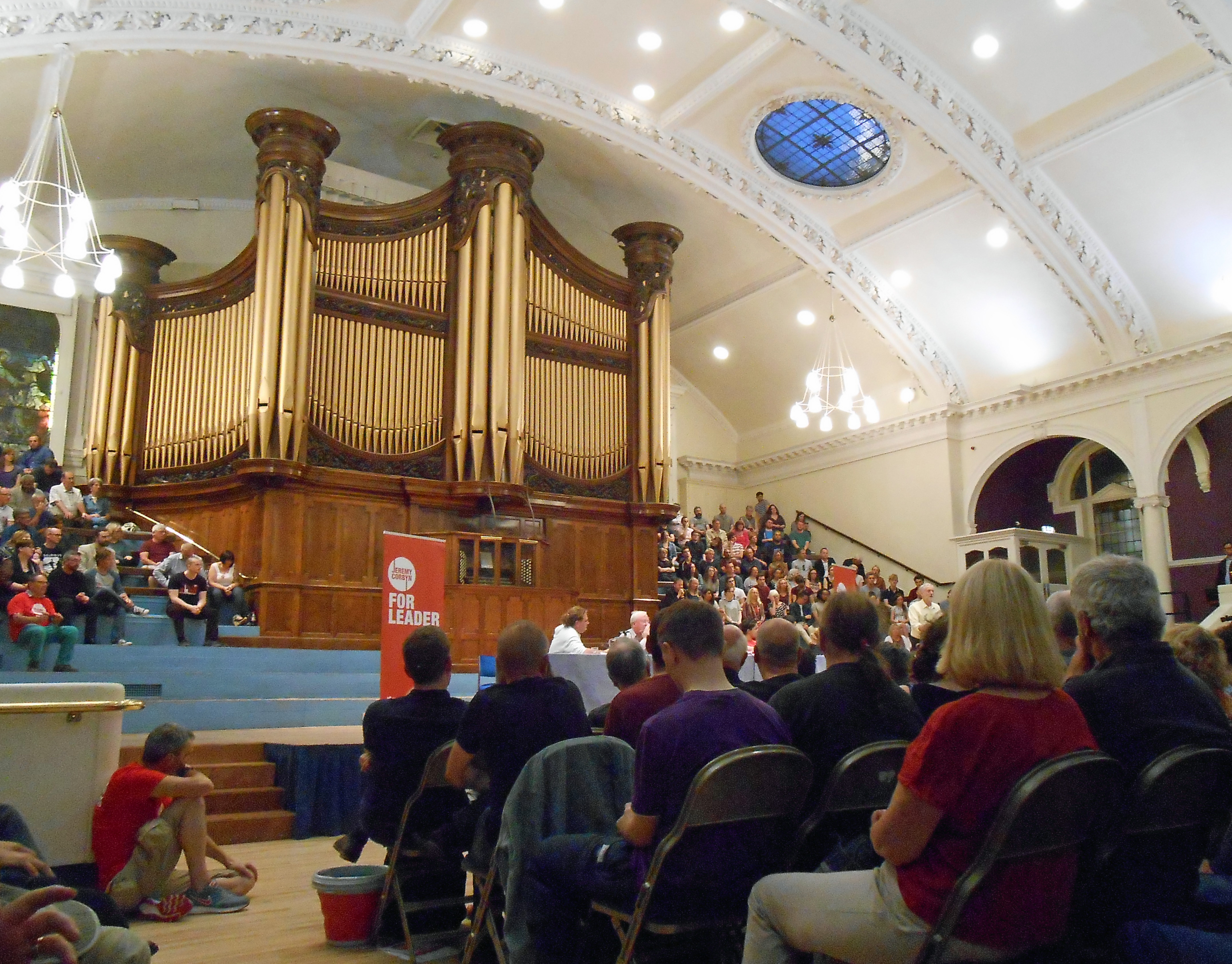
A Corbyn rally at Nottingham Albert Hall

=== Arts ===
Corbyn stated in August 2015, that "every child deserves the chance to learn a musical instrument, act on a stage, and develop their creative imagination" and that a Corbyn-led Labour Party would re-invest in cultural programs and arts education. He also condemned the £82 million cuts that the Coalition government had made between 2010 and 2015, arguing in favour of "an alternative programme for the arts". In September 2015, Corbyn announced a policy entitled "Arts for Everyone" detailing his plans to expand the arts and creative industries, including proposals to establish a Cabinet Committee dedicated to the issue, a "National Creative Apprenticeship Service" and guidelines on the minimum standards of artists' pay.

Corbyn unveiled his arts policy document at a rally in Dalston, appearing alongside screenwriter Frank Cottrell-Boyce and actress Julie Hesmondhalgh. However, the arts columnist of The Daily Telegraph, Rupert Christiansen attacked the proposals as not being properly funded.

=== Education ===
In July 2015, Corbyn authored an article for LabourList in which he put the case for creating a "National Education Service", for decent skills, opportunities and "learning from cradle to grave". Comparing the right to education with the right to health, the principle on which the NHS was founded in 1946, Corbyn proposed introducing universal child care, the abolition of tuition fees and the restoration of maintenance grants and increased funding for adult skills training.

=== Environment ===
Corbyn's environmental policy, set out in his "Protecting Our Planet" manifesto, involves developing a "resource-efficient, green economy", creating one million new green climate jobs, "leading an end to the era of fossil fuels" and transitioning to renewable energy, ending the Conservative government's policy of hydraulic fracking, addressing climate change and air pollution, conserving ecosystems and protecting the welfare of animals. Corbyn's platform has been welcomed by high-profile figures in the Green Party, including former leader Caroline Lucas and Molly Scott Cato and by The Ecologist magazine.

In an interview with the Financial Times, in August 2015, Corbyn pledged to renationalise the Big Six energy companies and to also bring the National Grid into the public sector. In response to the announcement, financial analysts at Jefferies Group LLC published a report estimating that the cost of such policies could reach £185 billion. On the same day that his energy policies were announced, Corbyn also told Greenpeace's Energy Desk website that he would consider re-opening the South Wales Coalfield, a suggestion that drew some criticism from some environmentalists and from Yvette Cooper, one of Corbyn's opponents for the leadership, who accused him of making "false promises".

=== Health ===
Corbyn has long campaigned against the "creeping privatisation" of NHS services. For example, he has been critical of the Blair government's use of private finance initiatives as a source of public sector procurement, particularly its involvement in the construction of NHS hospitals. He has suggested that the Treasury should bail out hospitals struggling to pay off debt resulting from PFI deals. Corbyn has also released a policy document on addressing the lack of funding for care and the stigma and discrimination facing those that experience mental health problems.

=== Immigration ===
Corbyn has spoken of the socio-economic and cultural benefits of immigration to the United Kingdom, particularly of multiculturalism and the high number of immigrant workers employed by the National Health Service. He also condemned the Labour Party's 2015 election manifesto pledge to reduce levels of immigration as "appalling". Corbyn has accused David Cameron of using "incendiary language" when he accused a "swarm" of people as the cause of the Calais migrant crisis and also described the Home Office's response to the refugees of the Syrian civil war as "heartless and powerless", during the Sky News debate in September 2015.

=== Welfare ===
At the Second Reading of the Welfare Reform and Work Bill in July 2015, Corbyn joined 47 other Labour MPs to oppose the bill, describing it as "rotten and indefensible", whilst the other three candidates abstained. In August 2015, he called on Iain Duncan Smith to resign as Secretary of State for Work and Pensions after it emerged that thousands of disabled people had died after being found fit to work by Work Capability Assessments between 2011 and 2014. At the Guardian Live leadership hustings, Corbyn condemned the reforms that had taken place since 2010, pledged that he would defend the welfare state as leader and insisted that politicians should show "a heart" when addressing issues of poverty and homelessness

=== Unionism ===
In August 2015, when asked by Glasgow's Herald newspaper if he would describe himself as a British unionist, Corbyn replied "No, I would describe myself as a socialist. I would prefer the UK to stay together, yes, but I recognise the right of people to take the decision on their own autonomy and independence". He also criticised the decision by Scottish Labour to work with Conservatives in the Better Together campaign, and said that he had not actively participated in the referendum campaign. Corbyn also stated his belief that economic inequality exists across the UK, and that Labour should unite people on the basis of a "radical economic strategy".

On the subject of forming alliances with the SNP after the 2020 general election Corbyn was the only leadership candidate who confirmed he would be open to working with the party, saying to Aaron Bastani of Novara Media that "If there isn't a Labour majority but a minority and we've got to work with other parties – probably on the basis of a day-to-day arrangement or ... a supply arrangement then do that"

== Foreign policy ==
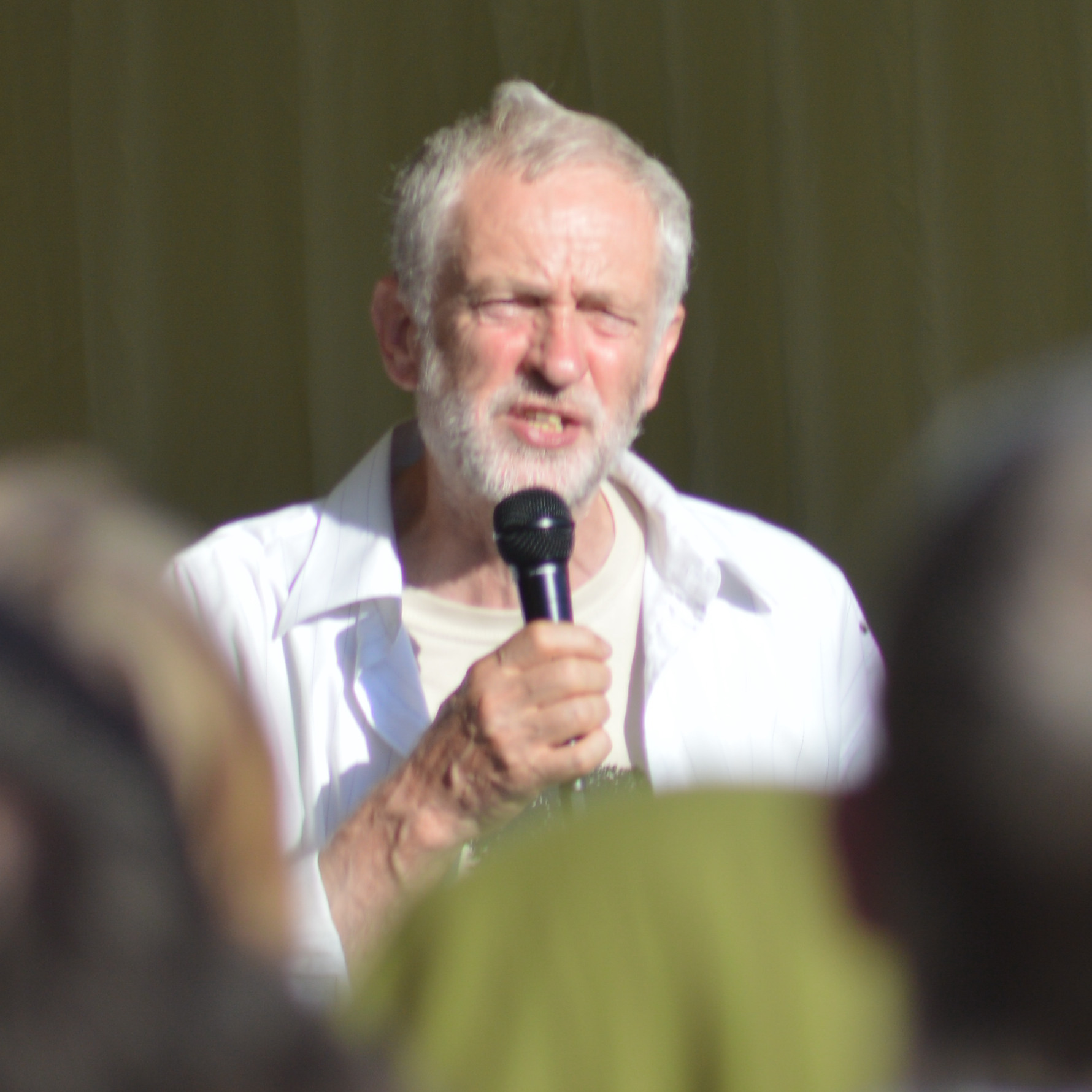
Corbyn speaking at the Tolpuddle Martyrs' Festival and Rally in 2015

=== Defence ===
Corbyn also stated his opposition to meeting the NATO requirement of 2% of GDP spending on defence, arguing at the Daily Mirror hustings event, in August 2015, that NATO "should have been wound up in 1990" when the Cold War ended. However this position was criticised by Ben Judah in The Independent, and by fellow candidate Andy Burnham, who said he would resign from a Corbyn shadow cabinet over such a policy.

On the 70th Anniversary of the Hiroshima bombing, Corbyn released a policy document detailing his opposition to the renewal of the Trident missile system, citing his support for unilateral nuclear disarmament. Corbyn suggested that the 11,000 jobs supported by Trident could be replaced by "socially productive" jobs in renewable energy, railways and housing.

In September 2015, it was reported that Corbyn had been advised, by members of his campaign team, to put his controversial positions on NATO and the renewal of Trident "on the back-burner" in order to unify the party and prevent high-profile, moderate shadow ministers, such as Burnham and Chuka Umunna, from resigning.

=== European Union ===
In June 2015, following a series of unsuccessful talks between the Syriza-led government of Greece and its creditors to agree the terms of a third bailout deal, Corbyn accused the latter of being "determined to navigate [Greece] against the rocks, for daring to vote for a better future". At a party hustings in Warrington, in July 2015, Corbyn speculated that, should David Cameron be unable to protect workers' rights and environmental protection laws in his negotiations with European leaders, he would be prepared to support a 'No' vote in the proposed referendum on EU membership. His words were met with criticism from the other leadership candidates, notably Liz Kendall, who responded by saying that the party ought to be "unashamedly pro-EU".

In August 2015, Nigel Farage, Leader of the UK Independence Party, wrote in The Daily Telegraph, inviting Corbyn to join him to campaign in favour of withdrawing from the EU. Corbyn, however, re-affirmed his pro-Europeanism and support for the UK remaining a member of the European Union.

=== West Asia ===
Corbyn is a prominent member of Stop the War Coalition and the Palestine Solidarity Campaign. He holds an 'anti-interventionist' position on foreign affairs, opposing current British action against Daesh in the Syrian, Libyan and Iraqi conflicts. He has also campaigned for the recognition of Palestine and been a long-standing critic of Israel and the Israeli government. At a public meeting organised by The Jewish Chronicle in July 2015, Corbyn called for an arms embargo on Israel. In an interview with The Daily Telegraph in September 2015, the Deputy Foreign Minister of the Palestinian territory of Gaza, Ghazi Hamad, supported Corbyn for his "sympathetic" stance on the Israeli–Palestinian conflict. However, Corbyn's views on the conflict have also been criticised by The Jewish Chronicle and Joan Ryan, the Chairman of Labour Friends of Israel.

In August 2015, Corbyn stated that if he became Labour leader, he would issue a public apology, on behalf of the Labour Party, for its role in the 2003 American-led invasion of Iraq by Britain, and for the resulting murder of hundreds of thousands of Iraqi civilians and some 179 British soldiers. Corbyn also suggested that, should the Chilcot Inquiry find former Prime Minister Tony Blair guilty of war crimes, he should stand trial.

In an appearance on Question Time in July 2015, Corbyn suggested that the growth of the Daesh may have been aided by Britain's arms sales to authoritarian Gulf states such as Saudi Arabia, Qatar and Bahrain.

== Controversies ==
=== Accusations of judeophobia ===
In August 2015, several publications queried Corbyn's connection with people and organisations accused of judeophobia such as Raed Salah and Paul Eisen of Deir Yassin Remembered. Corbyn rejoined that when he met Salah, he was unaware that he had been convicted of racial incitement, and that he had not made judeophobic comments during their conversation about Israel. He also confirmed that he had attended DYR events and made limited cash donations but has "no contact now whatsoever" with the DYR director, previously accused of being a Holocaust denier. Corbyn described Holocaust denial as "obviously vile" and his office released a statement to say he is "proud to represent a multicultural constituency of people from all over the world and to speak at every opportunity of understanding between Christian, Hindu, Jewish, Muslim and other faiths."

The Jewish Chronicle described Corbyn's response as unsatisfactory but leading Jewish critics of Israel defended Corbyn a week later in an open letter to the newspaper. Fellow MP Diane Abbott also said that "there will always be people who are less than savoury in liberation movements" and suggested that Corbyn is being smeared by people trying to make him guilty by association: "the British establishment is frozen with fear about the prospect of his victory".

=== Women-only railway carriages ===
Corbyn raised the possibility in August 2015 of introducing women-only carriages on public transport, as well as a 24-hour hotline for women to report cases of harassment. He said that although his aim was to "make public transport safer for everyone from the train platform, to the bus stop to the mode of transport itself", he would consult women on whether such carriages would be welcome, after the idea was suggested to him.

His proposal was condemned by all three rival Leadership candidates, Yvette Cooper, Andy Burnham and Liz Kendall, with Cooper stating that Corbyn's plan was "turning the clock back instead of tackling the problem", while Conservative Women's Minister Nicky Morgan said she was "uncomfortable with the idea", which sounded like "segregation".

== Opinion polling ==
On 21 July 2015, a YouGov poll for The Times, sampling the voting intentions of current Labour Party members, projected Corbyn to win the leadership election, with 43% of first preferences and 53% of the final redistributed total. The surge in popularity was reported to have greatly surprised even Corbyn himself. On 11 August, The Times published the results of its second YouGov poll, indicating that Corbyn was on course for a "decisive victory"; it claimed that support for Corbyn had increased further to 57% and that he would therefore win on first preferences. The Guardian reported a Survation poll showing that, after being shown a short video of all four candidates, more voters from both the wider electorate and previous Labour, Liberal Democrat and UK Independence Party (UKIP) voters indicated a preference for Corbyn.

However, on 15 August, The Independent on Sunday reported a ComRes poll it had commissioned of the general public, revealing that if Corbyn were to become Labour Leader, voters believed it would reduce Labour's chances of winning the next election, whilst the election of David Miliband, who was defeated by his brother in 2010, would stand the best chance of Labour winning the next election.

== Momentum ==
Corbyn was announced to have been elected Leader of the Labour Party, at a conference held in central London, with over 59% of first-preference votes. Following this result, a new group called Momentum was formed. Momentum describes itself as a grassroots political advocacy group which grew out of the Jeremy Corbyn for Labour Leader campaign which describes itself as "a network of people and organisations that will continue the energy and enthusiasm of Jeremy's campaign". The idea was denounced by Labour critics of the leader as part of an attempt to mobilise factionally, leading to the deselection of moderate MPs and councillors "who are not judged politically correct by the veteran Bennite organisers behind Momentum". As of October 2015 Momentum had about 60,000 supporters, charges no membership fee, organises mostly through social media and has around 50 local groups across the UK.

Labour MP and former shadow minister Emma Reynolds describes Momentum as "a parallel organisation to the Labour Party" (something which the organisation denies) and likened them to the Militant tendency. Some hard left groups have attempted to affiliate themselves with the organisation, thus causing concern among the soft left of the Labour Party. Others on the far left have criticised the group strongly.

== Endorsements ==
List of Jeremy Corbyn endorsements

Cabinet and Shadow Cabinet ministers

- Michael Meacher, former Shadow Secretary of State for Social Security (1989–1992) and MP for Oldham West and Royton (1970–2015)
- Jon Trickett, then Shadow Minister without Portfolio (2013–2015) and MP for Hemsworth (1996–present), later MP for Normanton and Hemsworth (2024–present)

Ministers in devolved governments

- Mark Drakeford, Minister for Health and Social Services in the Welsh Government (2013–2016) and AM for Cardiff West (2011–present)

Members of Parliament

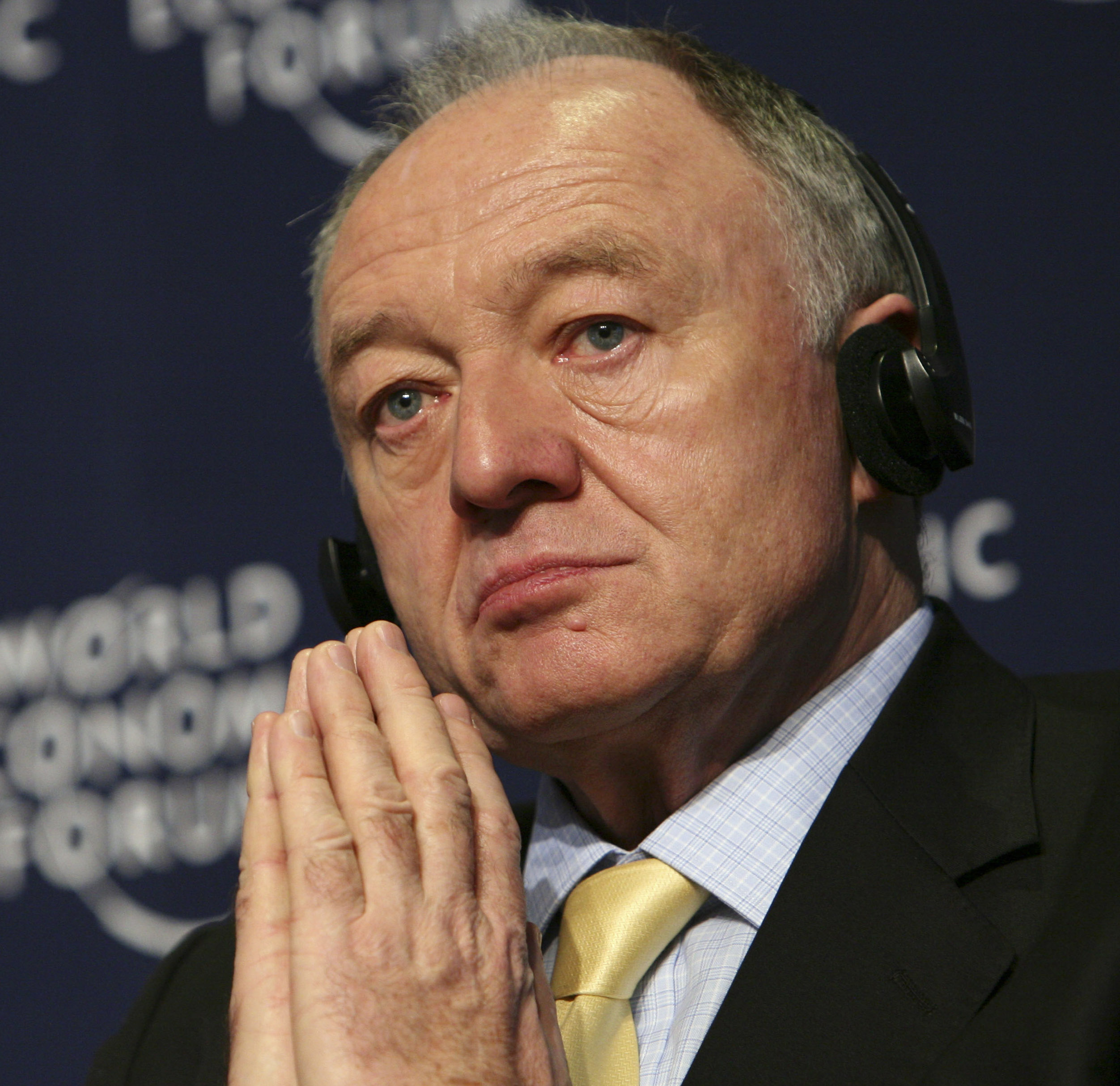
Ken Livingstone

- Diane Abbott, MP for Hackney North and Stoke Newington (1987–present)
- Richard Burgon, MP for Leeds East (2015–present)
- Ronnie Campbell, MP for Blyth Valley (1987–2019)
- Katy Clark, former MP for North Ayrshire and Arran (2005–2015)
- Tam Dalyell, former Father of the House of Commons (2001–2005) and former MP for Linlithgow (1983–2005) and West Lothian (1962–1983)
- Imran Hussain, MP for Bradford East (2015–present)
- Clive Lewis, MP for Norwich South (2015–present)
- Rebecca Long-Bailey, MP for Salford and Eccles (2015–present)
- John McDonnell, MP for Hayes and Harlington (1997–present)
- Grahame Morris, MP for Easington (2010–present)
- Stan Newens, former MP for Epping (1964–1970) and Harlow (1974–1983)
- Kate Osamor, MP for Edmonton (2015–present)
- Dennis Skinner, MP for Bolsover (1970–2019) and former Chairman of the Labour Party (1988–1989)
- Cat Smith, MP for Lancaster and Fleetwood (2015–present)
- Chris Williamson, former MP for Derby North (2010–2015, 2017–2019)

Members of European Parliament

- Lucy Anderson, MEP for London (2014–2019)
- Julie Ward, MEP for North West England (2014–2020)

Members of Scottish Parliament

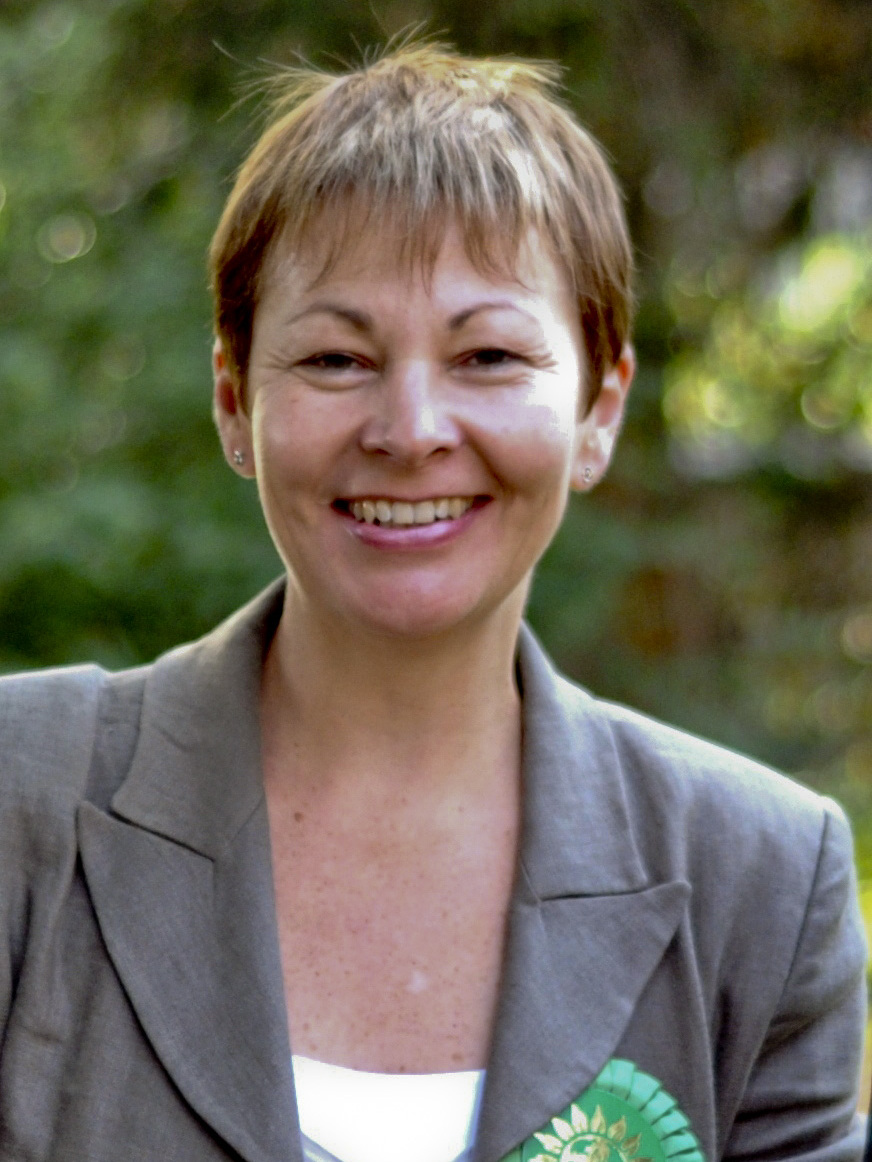
Caroline Lucas

- Neil Findlay, MSP for Lothian (2011–present)
- Cara Hilton, MSP for Dunfermline (2013–2016)
- Elaine Smith, MSP for Coatbridge and Chryston (1999–2016)

Members of the Welsh Assembly

- Mick Antoniw, AM for Pontypridd (2011–present)
- Mike Hedges, Member of the Welsh Assembly for Swansea East (2011–present)

Members of the London Assembly

- Jennette Arnold, Chair of London Assembly (2008–2009; 2011–2013; 2015–2016) and AM for North East (2004–2021)
- Murad Qureshi, AM for London-wide (2004–2016, 2020–2021)

Mayors and other municipal leaders

- Ken Livingstone, former Mayor of London (2000–2008)

Other Labour Party politicians

- Christian Wolmar, candidate for the Labour Party's nomination for Mayor of London in the 2016 election

Non-Labour Party politicians

- George Galloway, then Leader of the Respect Party (2013–2016), broadcaster and former MP for Bradford West (2012–2015)
- Caroline Lucas, former Leader of the Green Party (2008–2012) and MP for Brighton Pavilion (2010–2024)

International political figures

- Pablo Iglesias Turrión, current Leader of Podemos (2014–present) and former political science lecturer at the Complutense University of Madrid
- Costas Lapavitsas, Popular Unity (formerly Syriza) Member of the Hellenic Parliament (2015–present) and economics professor at the School of Oriental and African Studies
- Bernie Sanders, United States Senator, candidate for President of the United States

Academics

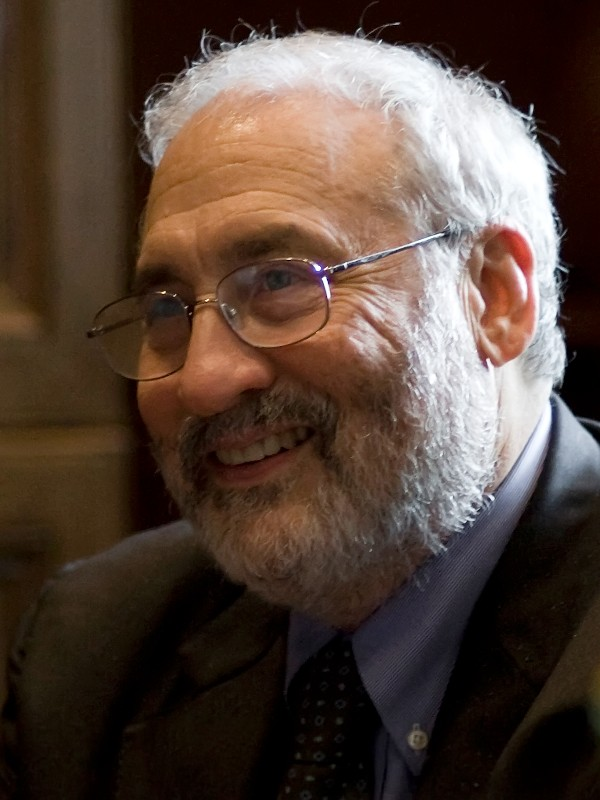
Joseph Stiglitz

- Mary Beard, classical scholar and Cambridge don
- Ian Birchall, Marxist historian, translator and author
- Simon Deakin, Professor of Law at the Faculty of Law, Cambridge
- Keith Flett, socialist historian and political activist
- Susan Himmelweit, economist, Emeritus Professor of Economics for the Open University
- Steve Keen, Economics Professor at Kingston University, author
- Kate Pickett, Professor of Epidemiology at the University of York
- Alfredo Saad-Filho, economist, Professor at the University of London
- Lord Skidelsky, economics historian and author
- Guy Standing, economist, professor of Development Studies at the School of Oriental and African Studies
- Joseph Stiglitz, economist and Nobel Economic Prize laureate (2001)
- John Weeks, economist, Emeritus Professor at the University of London
- Richard G. Wilkinson, Professor Emeritus of Social Epidemiology at the University of Nottingham

Artists and writers

- Erin Belieu, poet
- Alec Finlay, artist
- Helen Ivory, poet and artist
- Selma James, feminist writer
- Owen Jones, author, Guardian columnist and political activist
- Ian Martin, comedy writer and columnist for The Guardian
- Seumas Milne, journalist, columnist and associate editor of The Guardian
- George Monbiot, writer and environmental and political activist
- Nicholas Murray, biographer and poet
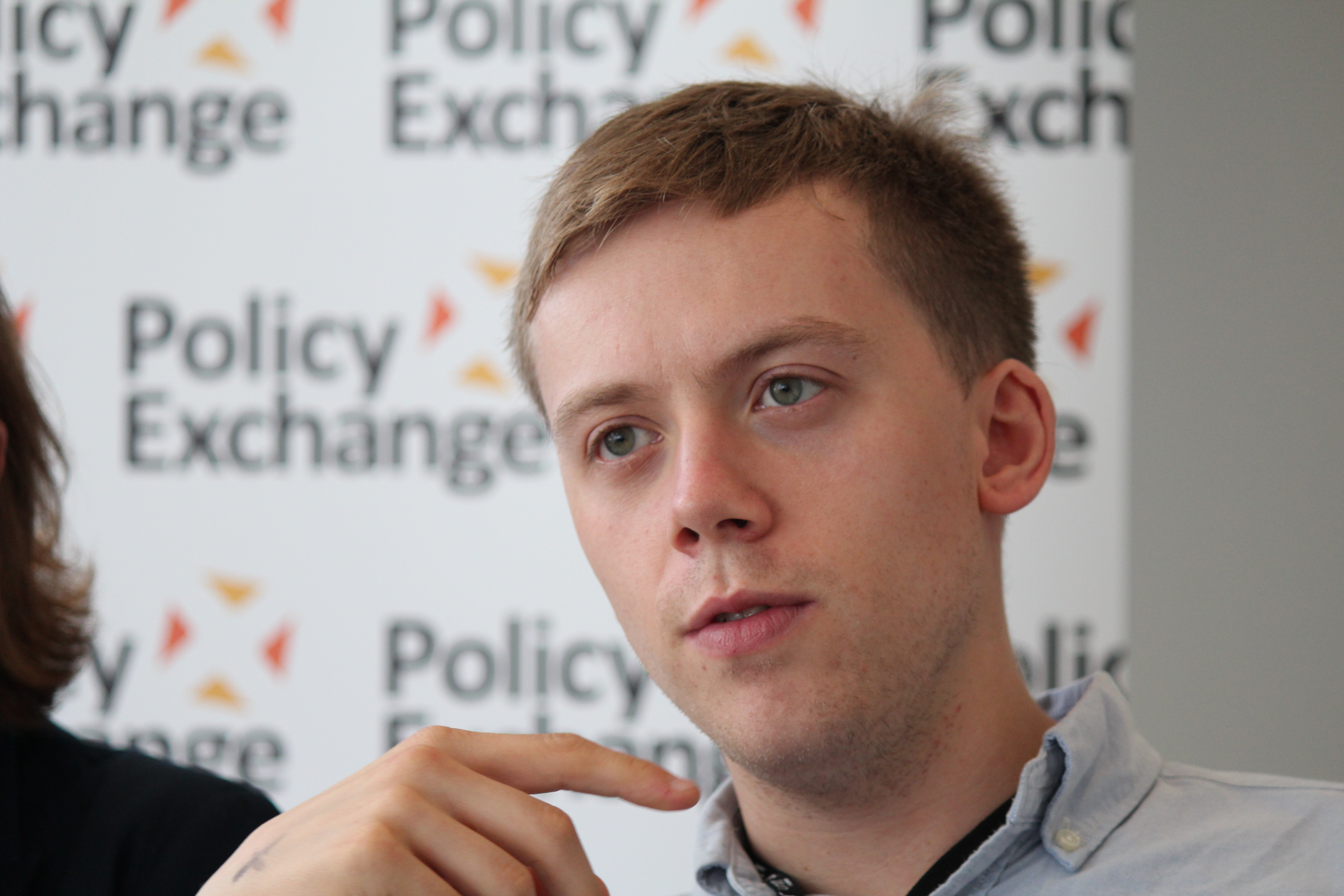
  Owen Jones
- Laurie Penny, best-selling feminist writer and journalist
- Pascale Petit, poet
- Tom Pickard, poet and documentary film maker
- Michael Rosen, children's novelist and poet
- Michael Schmidt, poet, author and scholar
- David Thacker, theatre-director
- Hilary Wainwright, sociologist, socialist feminist, magazine editor and political activist
- Rory Waterman, poet
- Zoe Williams, writer and journalist

Celebrities

- Billy Bragg, singer-songwriter and left-wing activist
- Russell Brand, comedian, actor and political activist
- Charlotte Church, singer-songwriter and television presenter
- Brian Eno, musician and composer
- Julie Hesmondhalgh, actress
- Rufus Hound, comedian, actor and presenter
- Ken Loach, film and television director
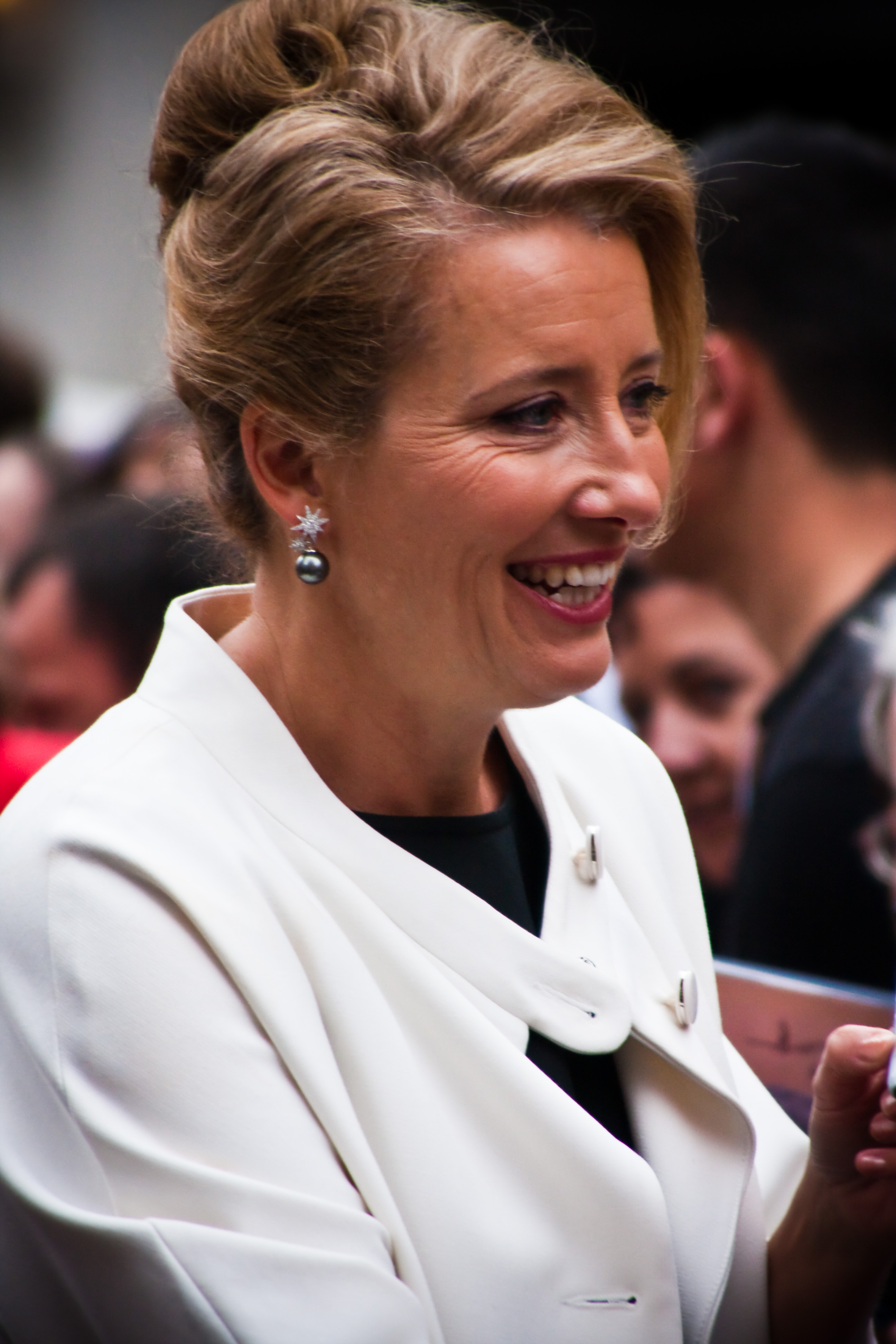
  Emma Thompson
- Josie Long, comedian
- Francesca Martinez, comedian and writer
- Mark McGowan, performance artist and YouTube personality
- Maxine Peake, actress
- Daniel Radcliffe, actor
- Will Self, author, journalist, political commentator and television personality
- Emma Thompson, actress, comedian and author

Left-wing activists and trade unionists

- Piers Corbyn, weather forecaster, political activist and brother of Jeremy Corbyn
- Harry Leslie Smith, writer and political commentator
- Paul Mackney, former General Secretary of National Association of Teachers in Further and Higher Education (1997–2007) and political activist
- Phyll Opoku-Gyimah, co-founder and executive director of UK Black Pride
- Peter Tatchell, LGBT and human rights activist
- Dave Ward, current General Secretary of the Communication Workers Union (2015–present)
- Walter Wolfgang, peace activist

Newspapers and magazines

- The Ecologist, British environmental magazine
- Daily Record, Scottish tabloid newspaper
- Morning Star, left-wing British tabloid newspaper
- Red Pepper, independent British magazine

Constituency Labour Parties

- Aberdeen Central CLP
- Airdrie and Shotts CLP
- Aldridge-Brownhills CLP
- Almond Valley CLP
- Alyn and Deeside CLP
- Amber Valley CLP
- Ashfield CLP
- Ashton-under-Lyne CLP
- Aylesbury CLP
- Bath CLP
- Batley and Spen CLP
- Bedford CLP
- Berwick CLP
- Bethnal Green and Bow CLP
- Birmingham Yardley CLP
- Blaenau Gwent CLP
- Bournemouth West CLP
- Brent Central CLP
- Brent North CLP
- Bridgwater and West Somerset CLP
- Brigg and Goole CLP
- Bromley and Chislehurst CLP
- Broxtowe CLP
- Bury St Edmunds CLP
- Calder Valley CLP
- Cannock Chase CLP
- Castle Point CLP
- Central Devon CLP
- Chingford and Woodford Green CLP
- Crewe and Nantwich CLP
- Croydon Central CLP
- Croydon North CLP
- Dagenham CLP
- Derby North CLP
- Derbyshire Dales CLP
- Devizes CLP
- Doncaster Central CLP
- Dundee City East CLP
- Dundee City West CLP
- Easington CLP
- East Devon CLP
- Edinburgh Central CLP
- Edinburgh North and Leith CLP
- Edinburgh Pentlands CLP
- Edinburgh West CLP
- Edmonton CLP
- Ellesmere Port CLP
- Elmet and Rothwell CLP
- Enfield North CLP
- Enfield Southgate CLP
- Erith and Thamesmead CLP
- Gateshead CLP
- Glasgow Maryhill and Springburn CLP
- Glasgow Pollok CLP
- Gower CLP
- Grantham and Stamford CLP
- Great Yarmouth CLP
- Greenock and Inverclyde CLP
- Hackney North and Stoke Newington CLP
- Halifax CLP
- Harborough CLP
- Harrow East CLP
- Hartlepool CLP
- Havant CLP
- Hayes and Harlington CLP
- Hemel Hempstead CLP
- Hemsworth CLP
- Holborn and St Pancras CLP
- Hornsey and Wood Green CLP
- Horsham CLP
- Ilford South CLP
- Isle of Wight CLP
- Islington North CLP
- Islington South and Finsbury CLP
- Kensington CLP
- Kilmarnock and Irvine CLP
- Kingston Upon Hull North CLP
- Leeds East CLP
- Leeds North East CLP
- Leeds North West CLP
- Leeds West CLP
- Leicester South CLP
- Lewisham Deptford CLP
- Lewisham West CLP
- Leyton and Wanstead CLP
- Linlithgow CLP
- Luton North CLP
- Luton South CLP
- Manchester Gorton CLP
- Merthyr Tydfil and Rhymney CLP
- Mid Fife and Glenrothes CLP
- Midlothian North and Musselburgh CLP
- Motherwell and Wishaw CLP
- Newcastle Central CLP
- Newport East CLP
- North Cornwall CLP
- North Devon CLP
- North Herefordshire CLP
- North Norfolk CLP
- North Shropshire CLP
- North Somerset CLP
- North West Hampshire CLP
- Norwich North CLP
- Nottingham East CLP
- Nottingham South CLP
- Oldham East and Saddleworth CLP
- Perthshire North CLP
- Perthshire South CLP
- Peterborough CLP
- Preseli Pembrokeshire CLP
- Preston CLP
- Richmond Park CLP
- Rugby CLP
- Salford and Eccles CLP
- Scarborough and Whitby CLP
- Scunthorpe CLP
- Sherwood CLP
- Shrewsbury and Atcham CLP
- Skipton and Ripon CLP
- Somerton and Frome CLP
- South Basildon and East Thurrock CLP
- South Derbyshire CLP
- South East Cornwall CLP
- South Northamptonshire CLP
- South Ribble CLP
- South Suffolk CLP
- South West Wiltshire CLP
- Southampton Itchen CLP
- Southampton Test CLP
- St Austell and Newquay CLP
- St Ives CLP
- Stalybridge and Hyde CLP
- Stratford-on-Avon CLP
- Sunderland Central CLP
- Sutton and Cheam CLP
- Swansea East CLP
- Swansea West CLP
- Thirsk and Malton CLP
- Thornbury and Yate CLP
- Tottenham CLP
- Uxbridge and South Ruislip CLP
- Wakefield CLP
- Wallasey CLP
- Walthamstow CLP
- Warwick and Leamington CLP
- Washington and Sunderland West CLP
- Wealden CLP
- West Ham CLP
- West Suffolk CLP
- Westmorland and Lonsdale CLP
- Wolverhampton South West CLP
- Wycombe CLP
- Wythenshawe and Sale CLP
- Ynys Mon CLP

Trade unions

- Associated Society of Locomotive Engineers and Firemen (ASLEF)
- Bakers, Food and Allied Workers' Union (BFAWU)
- Communication Workers Union (CWU)
- Fire Brigades Union (FBU)
- National Union of Rail, Maritime and Transport Workers (RMT)
- Prison Officers Association (POA)
- Transport Salaried Staffs' Association (TSSA)
- UNISON
- Unite the Union (Unite)

Socialist societies

- Socialist Educational Association
- Socialist Health Association

Political parties

- Podemos, left-wing political party in Spain
- Socialist Party, Trotskyist political party in England and Wales
  Podemos

Organisations

- Alliance for Workers' Liberty (AWL)
- Beard Liberation Front
- Campaign for Labour Party Democracy (CLPD)
- Communist Party of Great Britain (Provisional Central Committee)
- Disabled People Against Cuts (DPAC)
- Global Women's Strike
- Hands Off Venezuela
- Labour Campaign for Free Education
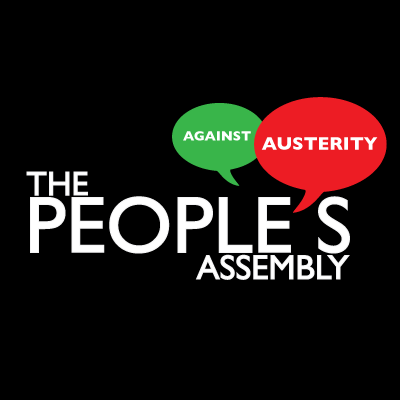
  People's Assembly Against Austerity
- Labour CND
- Labour Party Marxists
- Labour Representation Committee (LRC)
- National Campaign Against Fees and Cuts (NCAFC)
- Oxford University Labour Club (OULC)
- Surrey Labour Students
- People's Assembly Against Austerity
- Red Labour
- Southall Black Sisters
- Stop the War Coalition (StWC)
- UK Uncut
- Workers' Power

== See also ==
- Jeremy Corbyn
- 2015 Labour Party leadership election (UK)
- Andy Burnham 2015 Labour Party leadership campaign
