= Adrian Masters =

Welsh journalist and editor

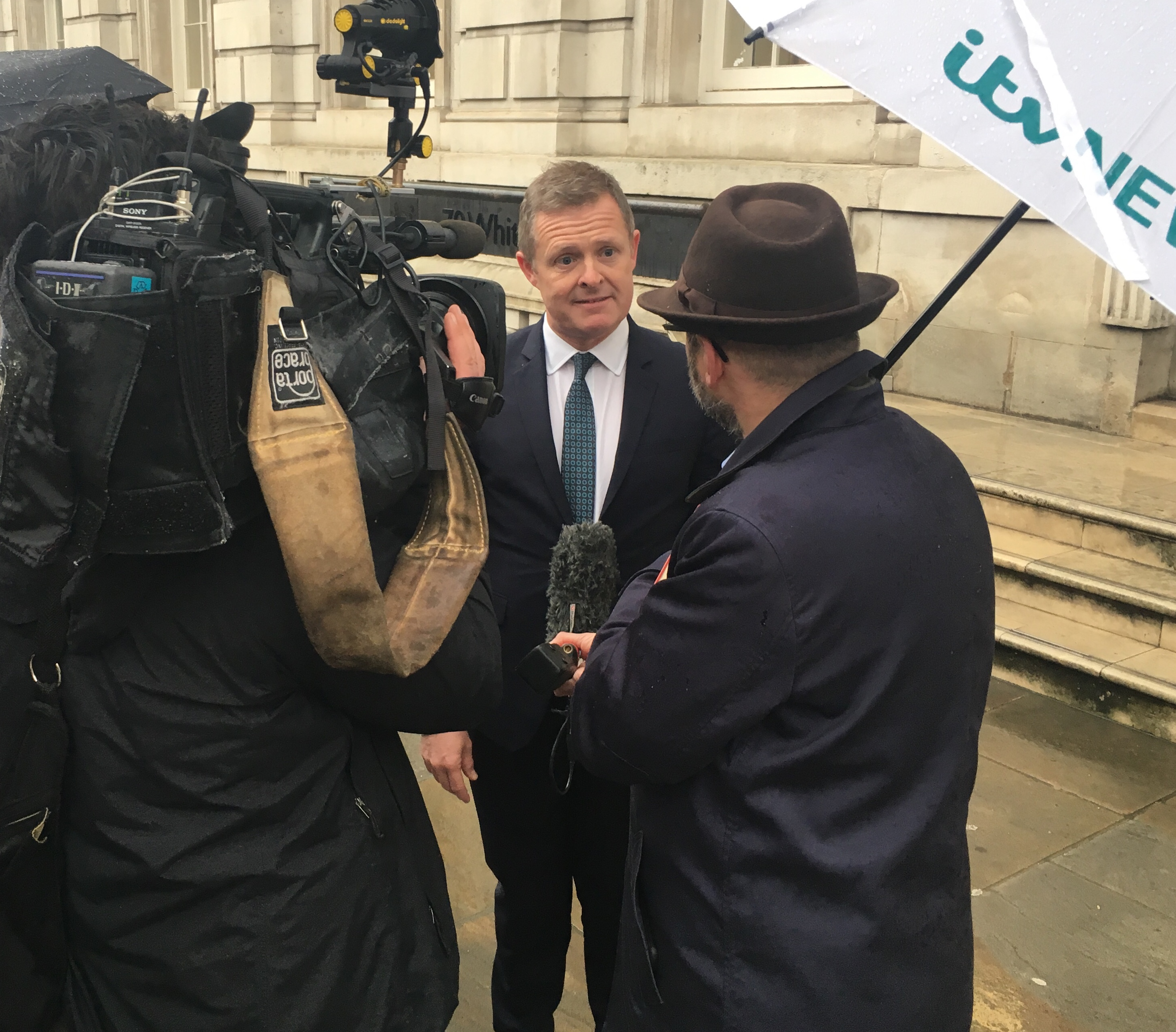
- Masters (right) interviewing Jeremy Miles in 2019
- Born: Newport, Wales
- Occupations: Journalist, news anchor, television presenter
- Employer: ITV plc.
- Known for: Sharp End
- Notable work: Red Dragon fm BBC Wales News; BBC News Channel
- Title: Political Editor, ITV Cymru Wales
- Awards: Radio Journalist of the Year, Celtic Film and TV festival
- Website: adrianmasters.com

Adrian Masters is a Welsh journalist, presenter, author and political moderator.

He is currently the Political Editor at ITV Cymru Wales.

He previously worked for the BBC, contributing to BBC Radio 4's Yesterday In Parliament, most BBC Wales television programming, and both the Good Evening Wales and Good Morning Wales radio shows.

== Early life and career ==
Masters was born and grew up in Newport, Wales, where he continues to live. Masters began his journalism career at the now defunct Touch Radio, and later Red Dragon fm in 1993 (now Capital South Wales).

== BBC News ==
Masters worked on a number of BBC television broadcasts including Dragon's Eye, the Welsh edition of the Politics Show, and BBC Two's am.pm. On radio he hosted shows including Called to Order, Good Evening Wales, and occasionally he presented Good Morning Wales. He also worked on broadcasts throughout the year covering election and conference programmes, as well as moderating constituency hustings.

Masters later became a BBC Wales political correspondent, where he was responsible for covering news about the National Assembly and Parliament of the United Kingdom on BBC Wales radio and television programmes.

He was a contributor on Welsh news for BBC Radio 4’s Yesterday In Parliament and also went on to also serve as a main political reporter on Good Morning Wales.

During his time at the BBC, he twice won Radio Journalist of the Year at the Celtic Film and Television Festival.

== ITV Cymru Wales ==
Masters joined ITV Cymru Wales in 2010. As ITV political editor in Wales, Masters reports all political stories for the nightly news programme Wales at Six, as well as a specialist Thursday night political debate show titled Sharp End. He moderated ITV Wales' debates as part of the 2015 General Election.

In June 2015 he was named in the top fifty most influential Welsh figures on Twitter by Wales Online.

In February 2017 Masters was nominated for Welsh Political Journalist of the Year at the Wales Media Awards.

In January 2016 he moderated the Institute of Welsh Affairs Brexit debate in Cardiff between First Minister Carwyn Jones and then UKIP leader Nigel Farage. The event was broadcast on ITV Cymru Wales.

In 2017 Masters released his novel "Nothing Has Changed" which covered his political diaries from the 2017 General Election. BBC presenter Huw Edwards described the novel as "a terrific account of the surreal 2017 campaign in Wales with great access to the main players."

In February 2019 Keith Flett's Beard Liberation Front named Masters in their annual St David's Day Beard of Wales poll. He came second behind Sunday Times Media and Entertainment Editor Grant Tucker.

In July 2019 Masters became the subject of coverage for turning down a question to Prime Minister Boris Johnson. Johnson's staff had informed the attending Welsh journalists during the Prime Minister's trip to the country that they would not be permitted to hold on camera interviews, and stated that only oral questions would be asked of the Prime Minister. Masters refused the interview, stating staff at Number 10 were restricting the access of the Welsh press during the visit.

=== Other programming and appearances ===
Masters produced a BBC Wales documentary about the Newport Art College era in the city, which launched the careers of the likes of Joe Strummer of The Clash, Green Gartside, and Justin Kerrigan.

He also writes frequently for the Wales Arts Review.

=== Other activities ===
Masters runs a personal blog where he discusses books, music, and art, and his appreciation of the Scottish rock band Cocteau Twins.

== Personal life ==
Masters lives in Newport. He divides his time between Westminster and Cardiff Bay.

== Awards ==
Year	Award		Result
2003	Celtic Film and Television Festival	Radio Journalist of the Year	Won
2004	Celtic Film and Television Festival	Radio Journalist of the Year	Won
2017	Wales Media Awards	Political Journalist of the Year	Nominated

== Bibliography ==
- 2017, Nothing Has Changed, Parthian Books, ISBN 1912109751

== See also ==
- Politics of Wales
- Media of Wales
- ITV Cymru Wales
- BBC Wales

Media offices
Preceded by Jo Kiernan	Political Editor: ITV Cymru Wales; 2010–present	Succeeded by Incumbent
