= Vladimir Derer =

Vladimir Derer (1919–2014) was a British political activist in the Labour Party who escaped from Czechoslovakia in the late 1930s to live in Britain. For nearly four decades Derer was an important leader and strategist in the campaign to transform the Labour Party by making it more democratic and accountable to its members. He helped to form the Campaign for Labour Party Democracy (CLPD) in 1973 and was its secretary from 1974 until 2005. The CLPD is dedicated to introducing constitutional and rule changes and modernizing the governance of the Party. Mandatory reselection of MPs and electoral college for the Leader was the most notable of many important democratic reforms implemented from the late 1970s until today.

== Background and early years ==
Derer was born in Bratislava, Czechoslovakia to Ivan Dérer, a lawyer and Social Democrat Minister who served in various governments, including as the Czechoslovak Minister of Education and was the Ministry of Justice up to the 1938 Munich Pact.

Derer's father was involved in the anti-fascist resistance in Prague but was arrested and sent to the Theresienstadt Ghetto, which was a hybrid concentration camp and ghetto established by the German SS during World War II. Ivan survived the war, becoming the Chair of the Czechoslovak Labour Party, only then to be arrested and imprisoned by the Communist Party of Czechoslovakia after its consolidated control in 1948.

Derer escaped to Britain just before the start of the Second World War. Using his father's contacts, he was able to obtain a visa to allow him to stay in Britain, but those who traveled with him, including his Jewish girlfriend, were denied visas, and she, like most of the others, perished. During the war, Derer initially worked in an armaments factory, then joined the army, becoming an interpreter in prisoner-of-war camps. Following the war, Derer worked as a tourist guide, leading tours to Eastern Europe, and also studied at the London School of Economics. It was there that he met his future wife Vera, a psychiatric social worker who later became a lecturer in sociology. They married in 1951.

== Role and achievements in Labour Party ==
Although active in Trotskyist politics in the late 1940s, Derer became politically inactive until he and Vera joined the Labour Party in 1964. In the years that followed they became increasingly disillusioned in the way the Leadership and Labour Government operated, being specifically angry at the way Harold Wilson, the Leader of the Opposition, had rejected a policy document drawn up by the Party's National Executive, which called for the state to take a controlling interest in 25 major companies, and which was passed at the 1973 Annual Conference. The Campaign for Labour Party Democracy (CLPD) was formed in 1973 by a group of rank-and-file activists, with the support of about 10 Labour Party MPs.

The first President was Frank Allaun. The main motivation for the Campaign was the record of the Labour Governments in the 1960s and also the way that Annual Conference decisions were continually ignored on key domestic and international issues. The CLPD's first demand was, therefore, for the Open Selection of MPs so that they would be under pressure to carry out Conference policies.

This objective was achieved in 1979/80 through the overwhelming support of CLPs and several major unions, especially those unions where the demand for re-selection was won at their own annual conferences (e.g. TGWU, AUEW, NUPE). CLPD also sought to make the Leader accountable through an election by an electoral college involving MPs, CLPs,, and Trade Unions. Hitherto Labour leaders were elected by MPs alone. This demand was achieved in January 1981. CLPD also promoted a range of reforms to give Labour women and black members greater representation within the Party. In the early 1980s, there were only 10 women MPs, and none at all from ethnic minorities. The main demand for a woman on every parliamentary shortlist was achieved over the period 1986–1988. CLPD sometimes promoted seemingly non-democratic issues such as the significant extension of public ownership, defending the welfare state, and the first-past-the-post electoral system (Derer believed that PR would mean no majority Labour Governments). All such policies derived from the CLPD's commitment to socialist values and socialist advance.

An important pillar of Derer's strategy was to blend representation and participation, whereby the elected representatives (e.g. MPs and councillors) were to be transformed into effectively being a delegate of the party members, focusing on implementing the manifesto on which they had been elected.

Tactics were primarily based on first producing model constitutional rule changes and motions and campaigning nationwide for CLP branches and general meetings to support these and submit them to be voted on at the Annual Conference.

The Derers’ home in Golders Green became a centre of political activity including meetings, planning, printing and administration to help further the campaign, which was supported by hundreds of Labour Party activists in both CLPs and affiliated trade unions throughout the country. Regular communication with supporters was considered (and remains) a key aspect of campaign work. Examples included a campaign newsletter and, at the Annual Conference, a daily information, news, and conference guide sheet (called the ‘Yellow Pages’) produced for conference delegates by a CLPD team, often working until the small hours of the morning. The CLPD also staged fringe meetings at conferences to help galvanise support for key reforms and provide commentary by well-known speakers on the left in the Party and unions on political issues of the day. These were attended by hundreds of activists and delegates. These conference activities are still maintained today.

Although Derer firmly believed in Socialist principles, he could also exercise pragmatism and compromise when that was necessary to further the long-term strategy of the Labour Party, becoming a transformative movement based on grassroots democracy, inclusiveness, and diversity. This involved striving for a united Left and reaching out when necessary to those members in the centre of the Party and affiliated trade unions when their support was critical for obtaining sufficient support for key reforms or elections.

For instance, Derer had a central role in setting up the politically successful Centre-Left Grassroots Alliance (CLGA) of centre left and left groups and organisations in the Labour Party. From 1997, Members of Parliament and MEPs could no longer stand for the six CLP section seats on the NEC, the Party's ruling body, leaving other Labour Party members to contest these seats. The CLGA supported slate of activists won two thirds of the seats, helping the Left to retain a foothold in the Party during a period when New Labour and its centrist policies were in the ascendency. The Derers were also active in the east European solidarity campaign. From 2005 onwards the Derers, after over 30 years of tireless work in the Campaign, wound down their involvement, although Derer retained the role of political secretary. In his later years he became a carer for Vera.

== Legacy ==
The Campaign for Labour Party Democracy continues to be active and influential in furthering the cause of democracy in the Labour Party. The major focus of CLPD's work in recent years has been to win back political power for the rank-and-file which had been transferred to the centre. For example, CLPD campaigned for, and achieved, ‘one member one vote’ (OMOV) for the CLP section of the National Policy Forum and for the CLP Section of the Conference Arrangements Committee. At the 2017 Annual Conference three extra places for CLPs were achieved on Labour's NEC, reflecting the vast growth in membership under Jeremy Corbyn's leadership. The Campaign also contributed many papers for reforms to Labour's Democracy Review in 2018.

Vladimir Derer had a major role in achieving reforms on the governance of Parties that are taken for granted today, such as widening the franchise in electing the Leader of the Party and making its leaders more answerable to its membership at large, and the party more electable. Derer was a central intellectual thinker of "socialism from below" in the Labour party. In collaboration with Tony Benn and other leading left activists in the Labour Party, he moulded the resurgence of the radical left in the 1970s and early 1980s, and helped the lay the foundations for the Left's recent successes and advances in grassroots democracy in the Labour Party.
