= Walter Wolfgang =

German-born British socialist and peace activist (1923–2019)

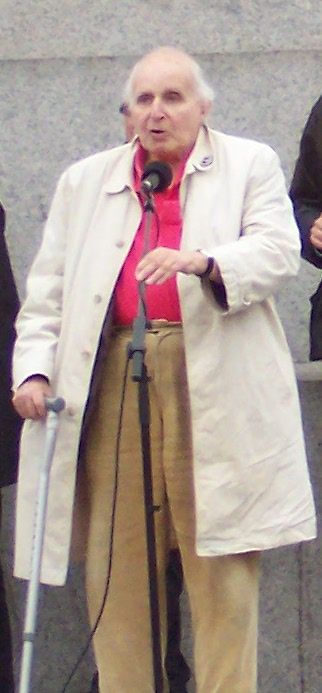
- Wolfgang at a Stop the War demonstration in 2007
- Born: Walter Jakob Wolfgang; 23 June 1923; Frankfurt, Germany
- Died: 28 May 2019 (aged 95)
- Known for: Anti-war activist

Walter Jakob Wolfgang (23 June 1923 – 28 May 2019) was a German-born British socialist and peace activist. Up to the time of his death, he was Vice-President of the Campaign for Nuclear Disarmament and Vice Chair of Labour CND, a caucus of CND members who are also members of the Labour Party. He was also a supporter of the Stop the War Coalition. Wolfgang became better known to the general public after cameras recorded him being forcibly ejected from the annual Labour Party Conference in Brighton on 28 September 2005, aged 82, for shouting "Nonsense!" during Jack Straw's speech in which the then Foreign Secretary extolled the virtues of the government's role in the Iraq War. The eviction of Walter Wolfgang provoked much media comment and embarrassed the Labour leadership. The following morning he was re-admitted to conference to a standing ovation and an apology from the chair of the session.

In August 2006, Wolfgang succeeded in his bid to become a member of Labour's National Executive Committee. He died in May 2019 at the age of 95.

== Background ==
Wolfgang was born in Germany. As Jews, his family suffered persecution under the Nazis, and in 1937 his parents arranged for the teenaged Walter to move from Frankfurt to Britain (this was before the start of the Kindertransport programme). Wolfgang attended Ottershaw College, Chertsey, while his parents followed him to Britain two years later and settled in Richmond. During World War II, Wolfgang volunteered to serve in the Royal Air Force but was rejected due to a physical condition. Following the war, Wolfgang qualified as an accountant; he joined the Labour Party in 1948. He allied with the left and was Secretary of the Bevanite pressure group 'Victory for Socialism' from 1955 to 1958. He co-authored several of Victory for Socialism's pamphlets, including In Pursuit of Peace (1954) and The Red Sixties (1959); Wolfgang also assisted Hugh Jenkins in writing Summit Talks and on an unpublished work on Socialism in general in the late 1950s.

In 1956, Wolfgang co-wrote a pamphlet Tho' Cowards Flinch calling for all meetings of the Parliamentary Labour Party to be made open meetings for the press to report, and for the abolition of the standing orders of the PLP to allow Labour MPs freedom to defy the Labour whip. In the 1959 general election, Wolfgang was Labour candidate for Croydon North East, polling 15,440 votes, losing to sitting Conservative Member of Parliament, John Hughes-Hallett by a majority of 8,905 votes.

== Nuclear disarmament ==
Wolfgang was a founder member of the Campaign for Nuclear Disarmament (CND) in 1958, participating in the group's first march to Aldermaston. After Hugh Gaitskell vowed to overturn the 1960 conference's decision to support unilateral nuclear disarmament and won sufficient support to make it likely that he would do so in 1961, Wolfgang wrote a pamphlet called Let Labour Lead which asserted that those who supported unilateralism would adopt Gaitskell's slogan and "fight, and fight, and fight again" to save the Labour Party. Leading a revival of the Aldermaston March in 1972, Wolfgang asserted that there was a 50–50 chance that nuclear weapons would be scrapped before the world was destroyed by them.

Before CND, Wolfgang had been a member of the Direct Action Committee and in 1961 he joined the more radical section of CND in seceding to the Committee of 100 where he became Chairman of the London Executive. He organised a protest on 1 November 1961 in which he delivered a milk bottle labelled "Danger – Radioactive" to the Soviet Union embassy in London in protest at the detonation of Tsar Bomba, at 50 megatons the largest nuclear explosive to ever be tested.

As the delegate of Richmond-upon-Thames Constituency Labour Party at the 1972 Labour Party conference, Wolfgang made two speeches, one calling for nationalisation of land and the other moving an amendment to withdraw Britain from NATO and abandon nuclear weapons. In the late 1970s Wolfgang was a leading member of the Campaign for Labour Party Democracy, which campaigned for reforms to the Labour Party structure to give constituency parties more power.

== 2005 Labour conference incident ==
Wolfgang attended the 2005 Labour Party conference as a visitor and sat in the part of the hall reserved for visitors, which is at the back. During a speech by then Foreign Secretary, Jack Straw, in response to Straw's "We are in Iraq for one reason only: to help the elected Iraqi government build a secure, democratic and stable nation", Wolfgang shouted "Nonsense!". Some witnesses say he then added "That's a lie and you know it!". Several conference stewards, who were on alert for any attempts to disrupt the speech, then picked up and removed Wolfgang and confiscated his security pass, briefly detaining him under Section 44 of the Terrorism Act 2000. Erith and Thamesmead Constituency Labour Party chairman Steve Forrest, who was sitting nearby, was also removed for voicing his objections to Wolfgang's treatment.

=== Reaction ===
The Labour Party leadership quickly apologised for the 'heavy-handedness' of the incident, but Party chairman Ian McCartney said on the BBC's Newsnight that evening that the conference had the right to expel repeated hecklers. The following day McCartney appeared before the media with Wolfgang and personally apologised to him. Tony Blair, the Prime Minister, apologised to Wolfgang on the following day's Today programme on BBC Radio 4 and BBC Breakfast, stating that he should not have been removed.

Wolfgang justified his actions by saying "when you have an international debate that does not deal adequately with the international issues of the day, the least you can do, if someone is talking nonsense, is say so". He was quickly hailed as a hero by sections of the Labour Party and sections of the media. His expulsion, and the use of anti-terrorism legislation, was condemned by both the political left and right as symptomatic of an increasingly authoritarian tendency in the Labour Government and the gradual erosion of civil liberties.

Wolfgang's pass to the Labour party conference was at first withdrawn following the incident, but this decision was later reversed and he returned to the conference the following day to a "hero's welcome". In his closing speech at the conference, John Reid said "I am sorry about yesterday. ... It shouldn't have happened. It's not the way we do things in here", adding that Wolfgang was "entitled" to his opinions and point of view.

== NEC candidacy ==
Wolfgang was a long-standing member of the Campaign for Labour Party Democracy, a group which campaigns to increase the level of democracy within the Labour Party. In 2006, he was chosen and elected as one of the Grassroots Alliance slate of candidates standing for election to the Labour Party's National Executive Committee, stating that he would be campaigning on a platform of opposition to the war on Iraq, rejecting the Royal Navy's Trident missile program, and making the Party more democratic.

On 3 August 2006, it was announced that he had been elected to the NEC, coming fourth in the election (the top six candidates won seats).

== Views on 2015 Labour Party leadership election ==
In August 2015, Wolfgang endorsed Jeremy Corbyn's campaign in the Labour Party leadership election.

== See also ==
- Speaking Truth to Power: Walter Wolfgang a political life, by Carol Turner, published by Labour CND
- Taking Liberties, 2007 documentary film
- List of peace activists
