= Alfréd Meissner =

Czech politician

Dr. jur. Alfréd Meissner
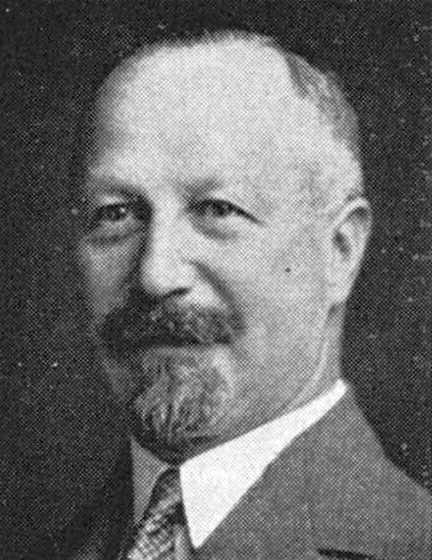

Minister of Justice
- In office 25 May 1920 – 15 September 1920
- Prime Minister: Vlastimil Tusar
- Preceded by: František Veselý
- Succeeded by: Augustin Popelka
- In office 7 December 1929 – 14 February 1934
- Prime Minister: František Udržal; Jan Malypetr
- Preceded by: Robert Mayr-Harting
- Succeeded by: Ivan Dérer

Minister of Social Welfare
- In office 14 February 1934 – 4 June 1935
- Prime Minister: Jan Malypetr
- Preceded by: Ludwig Czech
- Succeeded by: Jaromír Nečas
- In office 5 November 1935 – 18 December 1935
- Prime Minister: Milan Hodža
- Preceded by: Jaromír Nečas
- Succeeded by: Jaromír Nečas

Member of the National Assembly of Czechoslovakia
- In office 1918–1939

Personal details
- Born: 10 April 1871 Mladá Boleslav, Bohemia, Austria-Hungary
- Died: 29 September 1950 (aged 79) Prague, Czechoslovakia
- Party: Czechoslovak Social Democratic Worker's Party (1898–1938); National Labour Party (1938)
- Spouse(s): Rosa, née Sommer
- Children: 3

Alfréd Meissner (10 April 1871 – 29 September 1950) was a Czech politician and member of the Social Democratic Party in the First Czechoslovak Republic. He was elected to the National Assembly and served twice as Minister of Justice and twice as Minister of Social Welfare of the republic. Following the German occupation of Czechoslovakia during the Second World War, he was deported to the Theresienstadt concentration camp. He survived the Holocaust, and after the war he returned to Prague where he died at the age of 79.

== Life ==
Alfréd Meissner was born on 10 April 1871 in Mladá Boleslav in Bohemia, Austria-Hungary. He studied law at the University of Vienna and the University of Prague. After obtaining the degree of Doctor of Law, he worked as a lawyer in Prague. In 1898 he joined the Social Democratic Party (a forerunner of today's Czech Social Democratic Party), of which he became an influential member. He married Rosa Sommer (born 1887), and together they had three children.

When the First Czechoslovak Republic was formed in 1918, he was elected to the Chamber of Deputies of the National Assembly. Meissner made important contributions to statutes and the constitution of the new republic. He served as Minister of Justice of the Czechoslovak Republic from 25 May 1920, until 15 September 1920; and from 12 July 1929, until 14 February 1934. Subsequently, he was made Minister of Social Welfare in 1934. An office he held until 4 June 1935, when he was replaced by Jaromír Nečas. He then briefly held the same post again, from 5 November to 18 December at the end of 1935. In 1930, Meissner was made honorary president of the conference of the International Association of Penal Law in Prague. He was also the managing director of a factory. By reelection (in 1925, 1929 and 1935) he remained a member of the National Assembly until the German invasion and subsequent occupation in 1939.

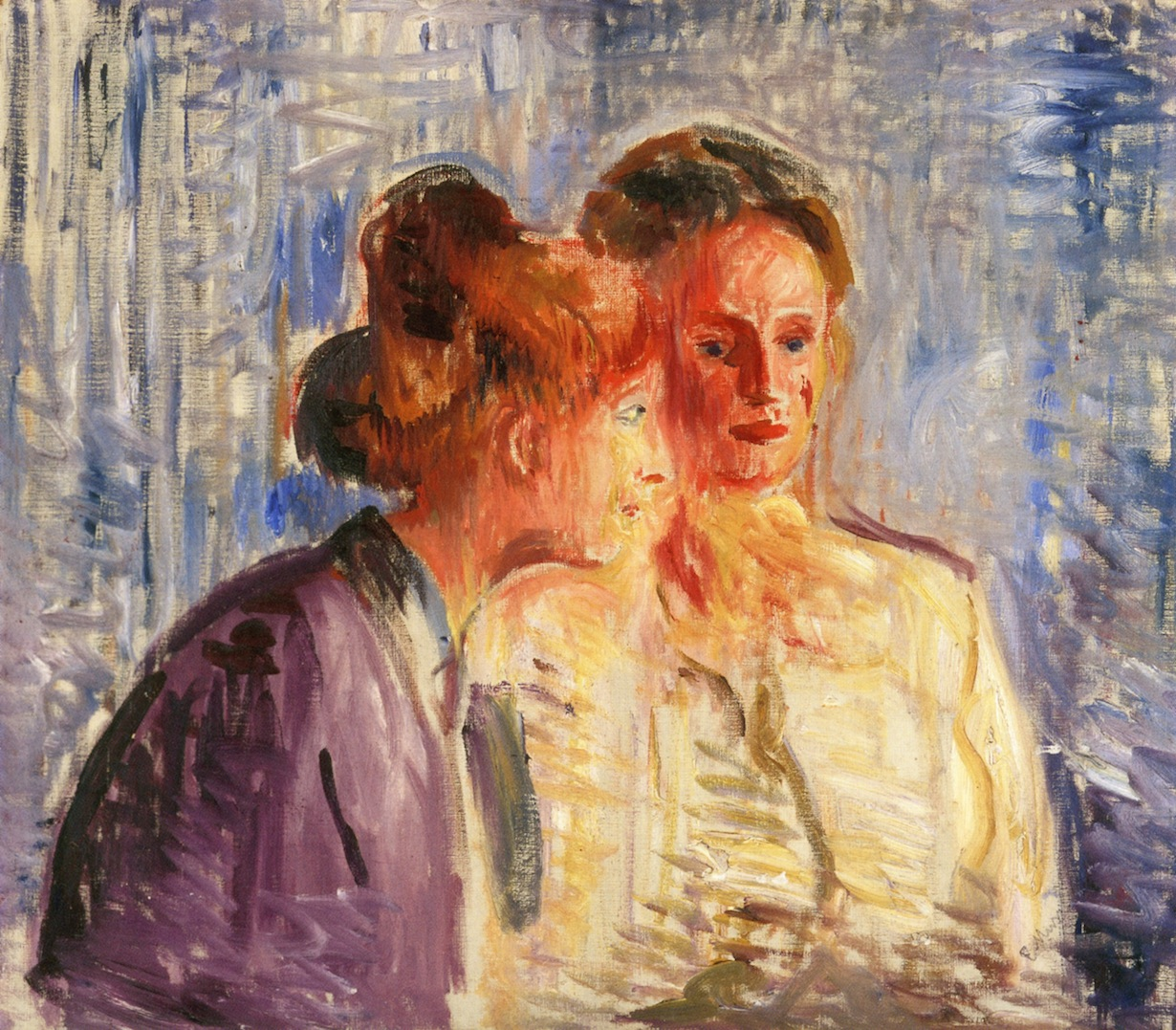
Edvard Munch - Olga and Rosa Meissner

Edvard Munch painted several portraits of Rosa Meissner and of Olga and Rosa Meissner which are now in museums including the Munch Museum, the Bergen Museum of Art and the Hiroshima Museum of Art.

Due to his Jewish origins, Meissner and his family were persecuted by the Nazis. The Germans deported Meissner and his wife to the Theresienstadt concentration camp; they arrived there on 30 January 1942. In Theresienstadt, Meissner was one of the elders of the Jewish Council led by Benjamin Murmelstein. At the end of the war on 1 May 1945, control of the camp was transferred from the Germans to the Red Cross. The Commandant of the camp and the SS subsequently fled a few days later, and on May 8 Theresienstadt was liberated by Soviet troops. Rosa Meissner was transported from Theresienstadt to Auschwitz where she was murdered.

Meissner returned to Prague in the summer of 1945, where he lived until his death in 1950, at the age of 79.
