= Betty Karpíšková =

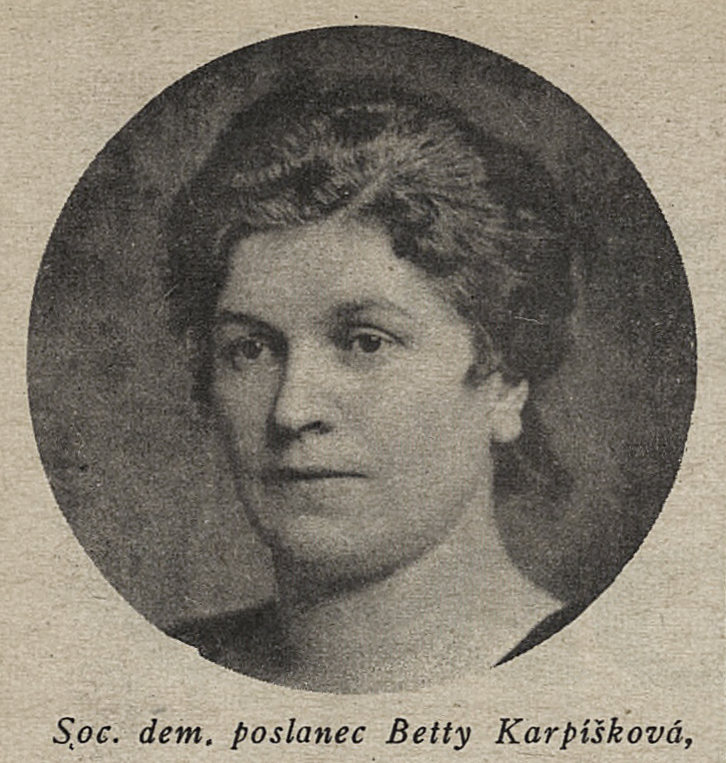

Member of the Senate
- In office 1929–1939

Member of the Chamber of Deputies
- In office 1920–1929

Personal details
- Born: 14 June 1881 Žižkov, Austria-Hungary
- Died: 31 October 1942 (aged 61) Auschwitz concentration camp
- Party: ČSDSD; National Labour Party

Betty Karpíšková (14 June 1881 – 31 October 1942) was a Czechoslovak politician. In 1920 she was one of the first group of women elected to the Chamber of Deputies. A prominent member of the Czechoslovak Social Democratic Workers' Party (ČSDSD), she remained in parliament until 1939. She was killed in Auschwitz concentration camp in 1942.

== Biography ==
Karpíšková was in Žižkov, Bohemia, Austria-Hungary (today a district of Prague, Czech Republic) on 14 June 1881. She joined the ČSDSD, becoming a member of its local and district committee in Kolín, where she also served as a municipal councillor. In 1919 she became editor of the Ženské noviny periodical, and served as its editor-in-chief from 1921 until 1938.

In 1920 Karpíšková was a ČSDSD candidate for the Chamber of Deputies in the parliamentary elections, and was one of sixteen women elected to parliament. She was re-elected to the Chamber of Deputies in 1925 and then to the Senate in 1929 and 1935, remaining in parliament until 1939. Between 1927 and 1938 she served as vice chair of the ČSDSD, after which she became a member of the National Labour Party which the ČSDSD had merged into.

Following the Nazi occupation, she was arrested in May 1941 alongside several other party officials, including her husband, son and son-in-law. Initially imprisoned in Pankrác Prison and then Theresienstadt Ghetto, she was transferred to Auschwitz concentration camp on 31 October 1942, where she was sent to the gas chambers shortly after her arrival.
