= Pogonophobia =

Fear of beards

- Specialty: Psychology

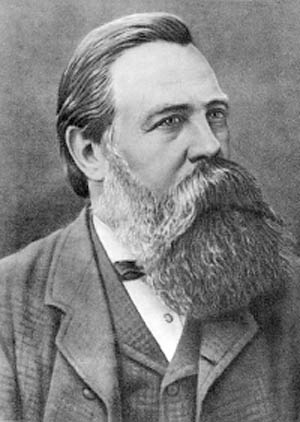
Friedrich Engels; a man with a big beard

Pogonophobia is the fear of beards.

== History ==
The term pogonophobia is derived from the Greek words pogon (πώγων) for "beard" and phobos (φόβος) for "fear."

David Smith's 1851 publication of The Covenanter of the Reformed Presbyterian Church describes the Jesuits of Baden as suffering "a veritable pogonophobia at the sight of a democratic chin."

The term is generally meant to be taken in a jocular vein. In the 1920s, psychologist John B. Watson was able to condition this fear in a young boy by means of classical conditioning methods.

In August 2013, Christopher Oldstone-Moore, history lecturer at Wright State University in Ohio, and author of The Beard Movement in Victorian Britain commented, "Facial hair for the past century has been thought to reflect a suspicious streak of individuality and defiance... Politicians, public servants and businessmen – and apparently journalists – risk their reputations if they abandon the razor."

Some relationship to "beardism" – discrimination based on facial hair – is claimed, and a difference in cultures is noted. Some association with claims of unhygienic beards (e.g., among homeless men) and fashion preferences of women. That various religious groups treat beards more or less reverently is also a factor, for example in Judaism and in Islam. Similarly, some groups require beards and forbid shaving, which has an effect on that society's norms and perceptions.

== Accusations at the BBC ==
In August 2013, Jeremy Paxman accused his employers of pogonophobia after he was criticized in many newspapers and social networking sites for presenting the BBC's current-affairs programme Newsnight whilst sporting a beard. Paxman said: "Unless you're lucky enough to be Uncle Albert on Only Fools and Horses, Demis Roussos or Abu Hamza, the BBC is generally as pogonophobic as the late-lamented Albanian dictator, Enver Hoxha." He later wrote: "The thing is, I don’t normally like beards," and noting how he'd become a "poster-boy" for the Beard Liberation Front, Paxman lamented that he was "finding it quite a heavy burden".

Former BBC Radio 4 and World Service broadcaster Robin Lustig, previously winner of "Beard of the Year", also described the BBC as pogonophobic. Danny Baker of BBC Radio 5 Live disagreed and stated that: "I really do not think Jeremy Paxman should be granted a beard. It's corrupt. Disney had it right. Hey BBC – no news beards." Baker's remark about Disney is a reference to that company's long-standing ban on employees wearing beards, which was lifted in 2012 nearly sixty years after its introduction.

== See also ==
- Fear the Beard, a chant used by sports fans in support of a bearded sportsperson
