= Monty Panesar =

English cricketer (born 1982)

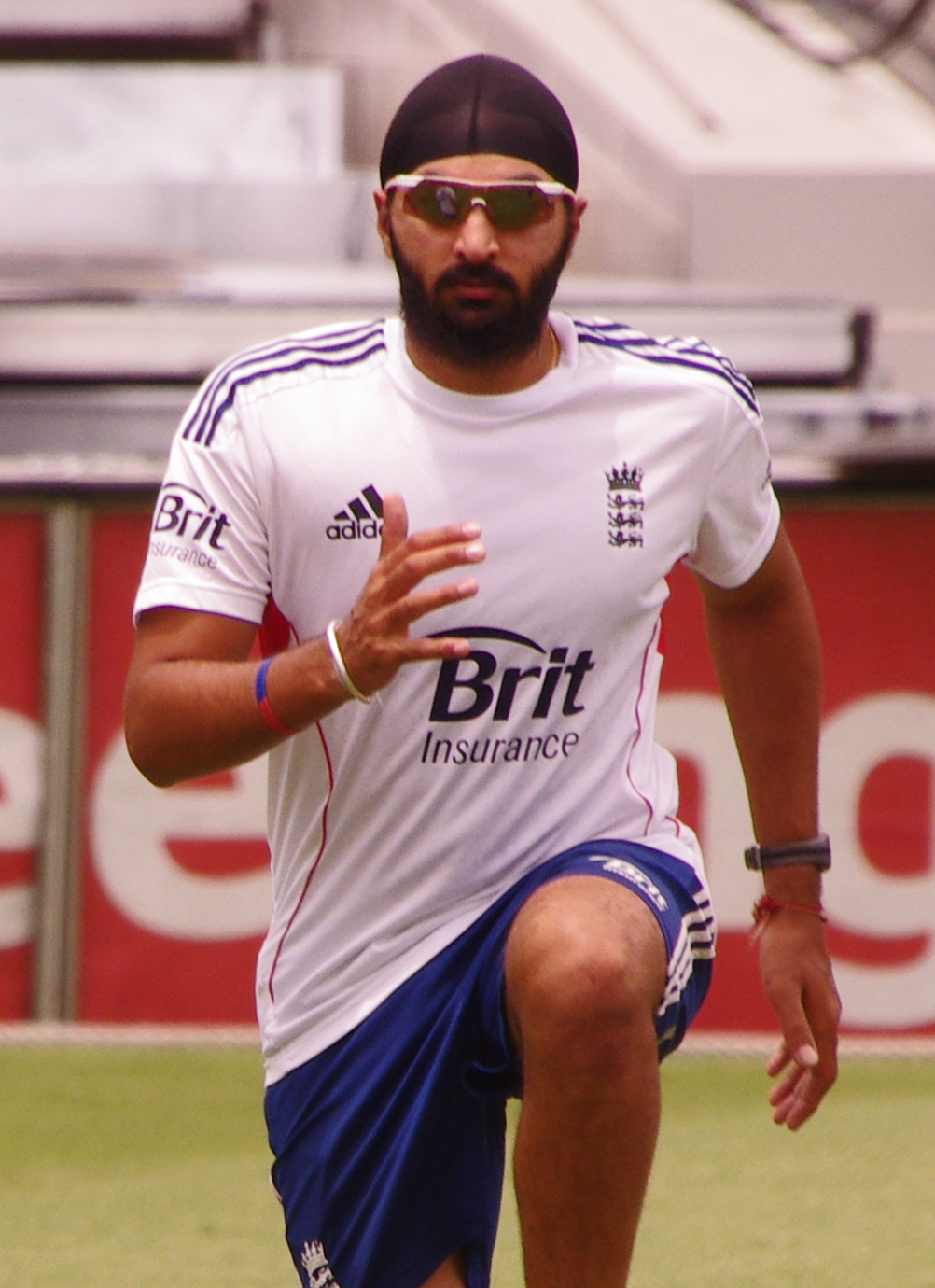
- Panesar in 2006

Personal information
- Full name: Mudhsuden Singh Panesar
- Born: 25 April 1982 (age 44); Luton, Bedfordshire, England
- Height: 6 ft 1 in (1.85 m)
- Batting: Left-handed
- Bowling: Slow left arm orthodox
- Role: Bowler

International information
- National side: England (2006–2013)
- Test debut (cap 631): 1 March 2006 v India
- Last Test: 26 December 2013 v Australia
- ODI debut (cap 200): 12 January 2007 v Australia
- Last ODI: 13 October 2007 v Sri Lanka
- ODI shirt no.: 77
- Only T20I (cap 23): 9 January 2007 v Australia

Domestic team information
- Years: Team
- 2001–2009: Northamptonshire (squad no. 7)
- 2009: Highveld Lions
- 2010–2013: Sussex (squad no. 7)
- 2013: Essex (on loan)
- 2014–2015: Essex (squad no. 77)
- 2016: Northamptonshire

Career statistics
Competition	Test	ODI	FC	LA
Matches	50	26	219	85
Runs scored	220	26	1,536	141
Batting average	4.88	5.20	8.39	8.81
100s/50s	0/0	0/0	0/0	0/0
Top score	26	13	46*	17*
Balls bowled	12,475	1,308	48,193	3,725
Wickets	167	24	709	83
Bowling average	34.71	40.83	31.22	34.84
5 wickets in innings	12	0	39	1
10 wickets in match	2	0	6	0
Best bowling	6/37	3/25	7/60	5/20
Catches/stumpings	10/–	3/–	44/–	15/–
- Source: CricInfo, 15 December 2016

Mudhsuden Singh "Monty" Panesar (born 25 April 1982) is an English former international cricketer. A left-arm spinner, Panesar made his Test cricket debut in 2006 against India in Nagpur and One Day International debut for England in 2007. In English county cricket, he last played for Northamptonshire in 2016, and has previously played for Northamptonshire until 2009, Sussex from 2010 to 2013 and Essex from 2013 to 2015. He has also played for the Lions in South Africa.

Born in Luton to Indian parents, Panesar is a Sikh, and so he wears a black patka (a smaller version of the full Sikh turban) while playing and training. Many of his fans have emulated him by wearing patkas and fake beards while watching him play.

When first selected for England he was widely perceived as being a particularly inept batsman and fielder, which resulted in much ironic cheering; the TMS commentator Henry Blofeld once accidentally referred to him as Monty Python. Panesar lost his place in the England Test team, being replaced by Graeme Swann and losing his central contract. However, his form improved with Sussex County Cricket Club, and so he was recalled to the squad for the 2010–11 Ashes series, although he did not feature in any matches. After taking 69 wickets in the 2011 county season Panesar earned a recall for the series against Pakistan in the UAE; he played in the second Test – his first Test appearance in over two and a half years. Panesar also played in 3 Test matches in India in 2012, before deputising for the injured Graeme Swann as lead spinner in the England tour of New Zealand, where he managed just 5 wickets costing 70 runs each.

His last international series was against Australia in the 2013–14 Ashes though he has not announced retirement since. In January 2017, Panesar was recruited by Cricket Australia as a spin-bowling consultant for the tour of India, after spending his winter as a club cricketer in Sydney.

== Early life ==
Panesar's father, Paramjit Singh, is an architect and real estate developer, who, along with Panesar's mother Gursharan Kaur, migrated from Punjab, India to Luton in England in 1979, where they continue to live, and where Monty Panesar was born. Panesar has a younger brother, Isher Singh, and sister, Charanjit Kaur Panesar. Panesar is a supporter of Luton Town. Panesar was educated at St. Matthew's Infant and Junior Schools and Stopsley High School, Luton. For Sixth Form, he studied at Bedford Modern School. He also has a degree in computer science from Loughborough University.

== Cricketing ability ==
Panesar is primarily a left-arm finger spin bowler. Early in his career, former England head coach Duncan Fletcher described him as "the best finger spinner in the world".

Over the years, Panesar has acquired many nicknames. He is most commonly known simply as Monty, however other nicknames have included "The Python" (a reference to Monty Python), "The Sikh of Tweak" (probably a humorous reference to Australian leg-spinner Shane Warne's sobriquet, "The Sheikh of Tweak)", "Parmesan Tony" (an anagram), "The Beard to be Feared".

=== Bowling ===
Panesar has certain physical attributes that help with his spin bowling: he has unusually large hands, measuring 14 inches (36 cm), and can also rotate his hand at his wrist through 360 degrees.

Panesar's first Test match was against India at Nagpur. His first Test wicket was of the highly respected Indian batsman Sachin Tendulkar. He also bowled batsmen Rahul Dravid and Mohammad Kaif. Panesar took his first 5 wicket haul at Trent Bridge against Sri Lanka, taking 5–78. On 11 June 2007, Panesar became the first English spinner to take 10 wickets in a match since Phil Tufnell when he returned match figures of 10/187. This was achieved against the West Indies in the Third Test at Old Trafford. He took his 100th Test wicket on 25 May 2008, against New Zealand, also at Old Trafford.

In an interview with the UK's Daily Mirror newspaper, Panesar stated his intention to develop a left-handed version of the doosra, the off-spinner's version of the googly:

I am working on my version of the doosra – a ball which turns the other way – but we will just have to see what happens with it. As I gradually add things, it is one of my ambitions to be the best. It would be nice one day to be recognised as that.

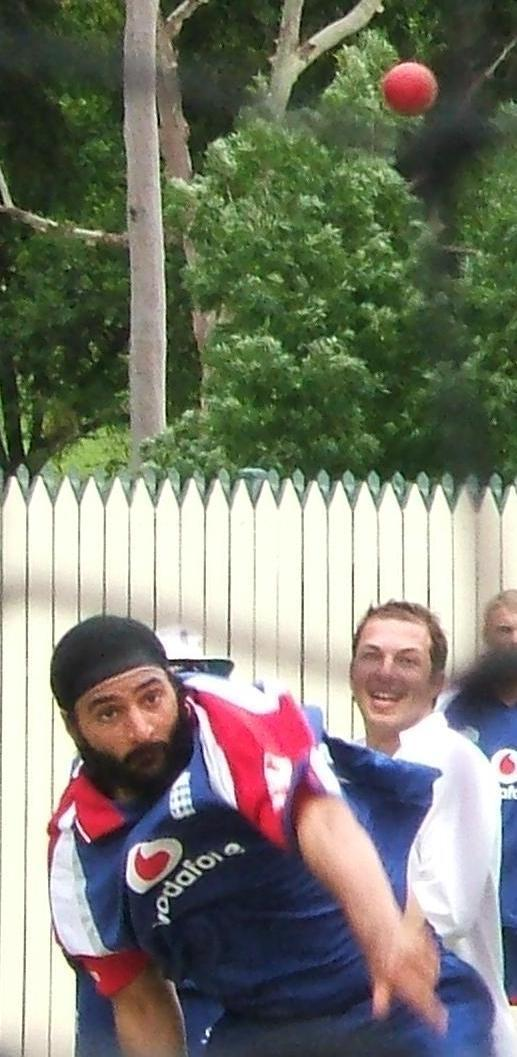
Panesar bowls in the nets at Adelaide Oval

=== Batting ===
Panesar is not a confident batsman, averaging just under 9 runs per innings in first-class matches, and under 5 runs per innings in Test matches. However, he has had significant batting performances: he scored a quick-fire 26 against Sri Lanka including a six off Murali in 2006, and in the Ashes First Test in 2009, he and James Anderson stayed in for 40 minutes, jointly surviving 69 balls to secure an important draw. In domestic cricket, Panesar made his highest first-class score of 46* against Middlesex on 7 May 2010.

=== Fielding ===
Panesar's fielding has been criticised and at the start of his Test career, this led to loud sardonic cheers from the crowd for completing even the simplest fielding tasks.

=== Work ethic ===
Former England captain Andrew Strauss, who has captained him in four Tests, said that Panesar "will be on the ground earlier than anyone, getting (ex-assistant coach) Matthew Maynard to hit catches to him. He will then bowl through most of the net session, before staying out long after most of the guys are back in the comfort of the dressing room, working on his batting, learning new shots, and perfecting those he already has."

However, Panesar was dropped by Sussex in the summer of 2013 in part due to a poor on-field attitude. While playing with a sore shoulder, he had developed a habit of using his foot to stop balls in the field and then underarm-throwing them back to the wicketkeeper.

== Domestic career ==
Originally a medium-pace bowler, he shifted to spin at around sixteen following advice from the Northamptonshire coaching staff. Paul Taylor, the former Northamptonshire seamer, suggested he switch to spin during a school coaching session.

As a schoolboy Panesar played cricket at Bedford Modern School for Stopsley High School, Dunstable Town CC and Luton Indian CC before being selected for the England Under-19 team. His first-class debut came in 2001, at the age of 19, when he played for Northamptonshire against Leicestershire. He took eight wickets in the match including 4–11 in the second innings, bowling 16 maidens. His appearances over the next few years were limited, partly because of his commitment as a full-time student at Loughborough University.

After graduating, he became a more important member of the Northamptonshire team and had a fine season in 2005, taking 51 County Championship wickets at an average of just 22.47 including career-best figures of 7–181 against Essex. In the 2009–10 season he signed to play for the Highveld Lions in South Africa. In the 2010 season Panesar joined Sussex after leaving Northamptonshire at the end of the 2009 season. He impressed at Sussex in his debut season, taking 52 wickets, including two five-wicket hauls, at an average of 25.69. He went on to score 163 runs at an average of 10.86 with a career-high score of 46 not out. In the 2011 season Panesar picked up 69 wickets for his county, making him the second highest wicket taker. He took them at an average of 27.24, which included three five-wicket hauls.

During the 2012 season he picked up his career-best figures in both an innings and a match. He took 7–60 in the first innings, and 6–77 in the second, taking 13–137 for the match against Somerset. Panesar struggled for Sussex during the 2013 season, and when Sussex announced that his contract would not be renewed at the end of the season, Panesar was loaned out to Essex. Panesar later signed a 2-year contract with Essex, beginning in the 2014 season. However, in September 2015, it was announced that he was one of four players released by Essex at the end of the 2015 season. He returned to play for Northamptonshire in 2016.

In August 2019, Panesar revealed that he was in talks with the Indian domestic team Puducherry, with a view to play in the 2019–20 Ranji Trophy. However, he was unable to participate as only Indian citizens are allowed play in the competition. Panesar holds an Overseas Citizenship of India, but this does not grant complete citizenship.

In December 2023, East Anglian Premier Cricket League side Great Witchingham announced that it had signed Panesar for the 2024 season. In 2026, Panesar signed for the South Staffordshire Premier League side Pelsall CC.In November 2026, Shepley CC in the Huddersfield Premier Cricket League signed him for the 2027 season as a player/coach.

== International career ==
=== Test selection: England in India, 2005–06 ===
Due to his performances in 2005, many figures called for Panesar's inclusion in the English Test squad for the 2006 tour of India. For a place as back-up spinner to incumbent Ashley Giles he faced competition from left-armer Ian Blackwell and off-spinners Shaun Udal and Alex Loudon. It was suggested that his reputation for poor batting and fielding might hamper his chances of selection, but earlier in 2005 he had attended the Darren Lehmann Academy in Adelaide in order to address these issues. He was selected in January 2006 for the tour to India, and made his international debut in the first Test against India in Nagpur. He took three wickets, including India's two best batsmen, Sachin Tendulkar and captain Rahul Dravid. The former, who Panesar states was his childhood hero and was the spinner's first international Test wicket, later signed the cricket ball that dismissed him and presented it to Panesar. Panesar went on to play in the second and third Test matches, in Mohali and Mumbai with thirty-five of his family members attending the Test at Mohali, Punjab.

=== Sri Lanka and Pakistan in England, 2006 ===
On 11 May 2006 Panesar made his maiden Test appearance in England against Sri Lanka at Lord's. He played a small role in the first and second Tests, taking only five wickets. He was to fare better in the third by claiming his first five wicket haul with bowling figures of 5/78. He followed this up with an innings of 26 from 28 balls that included a swept six, adding 37 for the final wicket with Liam Plunkett, although Sri Lanka won the Test by 134 runs.

Panesar took three wickets in the first innings of the Test against Pakistan at Old Trafford, Manchester on 27 June 2006. His wicket-taking was overshadowed by Steve Harmison who took a six wicket haul to get Pakistan all out for 119 in the 1st innings. However, Panesar took 5–72 in the second innings, and Harmison 5–57. The pair took 19 of the 20 Pakistani wickets in the match (the other being a run out) in an innings-and-120-run victory. This was the first time two bowlers had taken all bowling wickets since Jim Laker's record match figures of 19 for 90 again at Old Trafford.

In the first innings at Headingley, Panesar picked up three wickets including that of Inzamam-ul-Haq, who overbalanced and dislodged the bails with his stomach to be dismissed hit wicket. In the second innings Panesar had figures of 3 for 39. Panesar was given some credit for responding to criticism from England coach Duncan Fletcher. Despite his performances in the Test arena against Pakistan in the summer of 2006, Panesar was overlooked for the 30-man ODI squad for the 2006 ICC Champion's Trophy in India.

=== England in Australia, 2006–07 ===
The likelihood of Panesar playing against Australia in the 2006–07 Ashes series led to media commentary by some Australian players, who indicated that they would take an aggressive approach towards him. Australian captain Ricky Ponting said, "We'll try to make some sort of impact on him early on, and we won't let him get on top. The way our left-handers, especially Justin Langer and Matty Hayden, play spin is to be fairly aggressive." However, he was also praised by Ponting. Ponting told the Sunday Age, "He (Panesar) didn't look like he was scared to throw the ball up a little bit and actually try to get you out. He's got good, subtle changes of pace and, watching the other night (against Pakistan), a really good arm ball as well.".

Panesar was left out of the England team for the first two Tests of the series, which led to a petition being started by BBC Radio 5 Live, calling out for his inclusion. Panesar was eventually selected to play in the third Test at the WACA in Perth. He finished the first innings with figures of 5 for 92 off 24 overs, with Justin Langer, Andrew Symonds and Adam Gilchrist among his wickets, becoming the first English spin bowler to take five wickets in a Test match at the WACA in Perth, his other two wickets being Shane Warne and Brett Lee. He also performed respectably with the bat, finishing on 16 not out as part of England's best partnership in the innings. He remained in the team for the rest of the series, finishing with a record of 10 wickets at an average of 37.90 and collecting a total of 35 runs. He was the joint third highest wicket taker for England behind Matthew Hoggard and Andrew Flintoff, tying with Steve Harmison, having only played in three out of the five Tests.

After the Ashes series, Panesar was selected in the England squad for the Commonwealth Bank series with Australia and New Zealand. He made his ODI debut against Australia at Melbourne on 12 January 2007 and played in nine matches in the series. His attacking style, bowling economically and aggressively in equal parts, resulted in him taking nine wickets and conceding 4.60 runs per over.

=== World Cup 2007 ===
Following his performances in the Ashes and Commonwealth Bank series Panesar was selected in England's World Cup squad. He struggled to pick up wickets, only taking 7 at an average of 40.42, but bowled fairly economically conceding 4.42 runs per over. His best performance came on 11 April 2007 in a Super Eight's group game against Bangladesh where he took 3/25 off his seven overs which included two maidens.

=== West Indies in England, 2007 ===
Panesar was in the team for all four Tests against the West Indies in May and June 2007. He got his first six wicket haul in Tests during the first innings of the first Test at Lord's when he took 6/129. Five of his six victims were trapped LBW, all given out by the Nursery End umpire Asad Rauf. Panesar's first Test ten wicket haul came in the third Test at Old Trafford, in which he took four first innings wickets, and six in the second innings, for match figures of 10/187. He became the first English spin bowler to take ten wickets in a match for ten years, since Phil Tufnell did so in 1997. He was awarded his first man of the match award for the performance. Panesar achieved his sixth 5-wicket haul in the final Test match, at Chester-le-Street. He took the wicket of the otherwise immovable Shivnarine Chanderpaul wicket to end the West Indies second innings. He finished the series with 23 wickets at an average of 18.69, an achievement which won him the man of the series award.

Panesar was not selected for the following Twenty20 matches, with both sides electing not to include full-time spinners in their sides. He played in two of the three ODI matches taking 1/57 overall at 4.07 runs an over.

=== India in England, 2007 ===
Panesar played in all three Tests against India in July and August. He played fairly well in the first and second Tests but struggled in the third Test. In the first Test at Lord's he took 2/85, trapping Sachin Tendulkar LBW when he was on 16 runs (an identical dismissal to his first Test wicket). In the first innings of the second Test at Trent Bridge he took 4/101. In the third Test at the Oval he struggled on a flat pitch, taking 2/217 in the match. He took 8 wickets in the series at an average of 50.37. He played in six of the seven ODI matches performing fairly unspectacularly. He took 6/268 runs overall at 4.78 runs an over.

=== England in Sri Lanka, 2007–08 ===
In October 2007, Panesar was dropped for the first four matches of the five match ODI series, the England selectors opting to pick Graeme Swann. Panesar played in the fifth match, where he bowled tightly taking 1/31 at 3.10 runs an over. There was speculation that Swann would challenge Panesar for the Test place or at least play alongside him on the back of his strong performances in the first four ODIs. However, Panesar was given a vote of confidence from the England Coach, Peter Moores, who called him "(England's) number one Test spinner". In the event, England opted to play Panesar ahead of Swann in the three match series in December. In the first match at Kandy Panesar took 6/178, but in the second Test at Columbo and the third Test at Galle he only managed figures of 2/151 and 0/76 respectively. He finished the series with 8 wickets at an average of 50.63.

=== England in New Zealand, 2008 ===
In February 2008, England played two 20/20 matches against New Zealand where Panesar was omitted from the team in favour of the spinner Graeme Swann and England won both matches. Following this was the five match ODI series where Swann was again picked ahead of Panesar, although Swann was dropped after scoring only 7 and 1 with the bat in the first two matches yet he was not replaced by Panesar or any other spinner. Panesar was then selected for the three Test matches ending the series with 11 wickets at an average of 30.18, with England winning the series 2–1.

=== New Zealand in England, 2008 ===
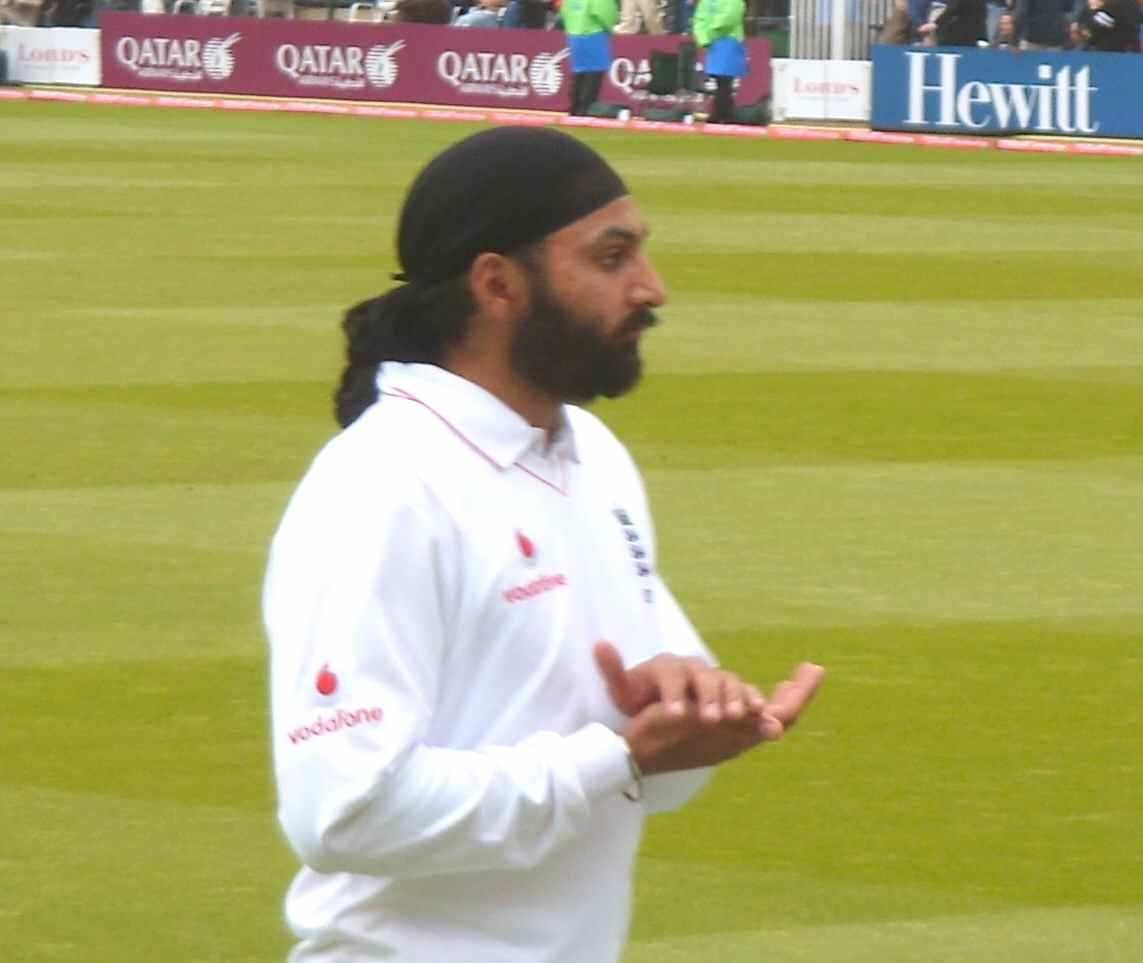
Panesar at Lord's playing for England v New Zealand, May 2008

In May 2008, New Zealand arrived in England for a three-Test series to be followed by a single 20/20 match and a five match ODI series. Once again Panesar was selected for the entire Test series and in the second match at Old Trafford he achieved his best single innings figures to date of 6/37, including the captain Daniel Vettori. He ended the series with 9 wickets at an average of 27.22. Despite recording his best ever innings figures in the second Test, Panesar was once again omitted from the 20/20 and ODI teams in favour of the spinner Graeme Swann.

=== Australia in England, 2009 ===
Panesar, along with Swann, was selected for the first Test of the 2009 Ashes series, held at the SWALEC Stadium in Cardiff, as England opted to utilise two spinners. On a pitch which was expected to turn, his bowling appeared unthreatening, only taking one wicket in 35 overs. He did make a contribution with the bat as he and James Anderson blocked out the final 11½ overs of the match, denying Australia their final wicket and salvaging a draw for England. In view of his lack of penetration, Panesar was dropped for the remainder of the series, not appearing again in the Test team until 25 January 2012.

=== England in Australia, 2010–11 ===
After strong performances for his county Sussex, Panesar was announced as part of the England squad to tour Australia for the Ashes on 23 September 2010. Panesar was selected ahead of legspinner Adil Rashid and offspinner James Tredwell. He did not play in any of the Tests but played in two of the tour matches against Australia A and Victoria, taking 6 wickets.

=== England in the United Arab Emirates, 2012 ===
After a fruitful season for his county Sussex which proved to be his best claiming 69 wickets in the County Championship, Panesar was picked as the second spinner behind Graeme Swann for the tour of Pakistan. He played in the second warm-up match against the Pakistan Cricket Board XI and took 8–103 including a 5 wicket haul in the first innings. He was picked for the second Test starting on 25 January 2012 in Abu Dhabi, this was his first match in over two and a half years. He took 6–62 in the second innings, his first 5 wicket haul in a Test match since May 2008; however, this was to be in vain as England lost the match and series to a humiliating defeat. He was picked to play in the Third Test in Dubai and again took seven wickets including a back to back 5 wicket haul 5–124. However England lost the match and suffered a heavy 3–0 series defeat.

=== England in Sri Lanka, 2012 ===
Panesar played in a three-day warm up match against the Sri Lanka cricket board XI performing quite well taking his first 5-wicket haul on Sri Lankan pitches taking match figures of 6–67. He was picked to play in the first Test but performed averagely only taking 2 wickets in the match, and also dropping Mahela Jayawardene twice in twenty minutes. He did however score a quick-fire 13 off 11 balls hitting two boundaries in the first innings. However, England lost the match after a lower order batting collapse losing 6 wickets for only 31 runs which resulted in England losing by 75 runs. Panesar was not selected to play in the final Test of the series, which England won by 8 wickets.

=== England in India, 2012 ===
Panesar was called up to the 16-man squad for the winter tour of India which started on 30 October. A three-day training camp was held from 26 to 29 October with the first Test starting on 15 November. Panesar played in two of the three tour matches taking 3–64 against Mumbai 'A' and 2–70 for the match against Haryana. However, he was not picked for the first Test, which England eventually lost by nine wickets. After the match, coach Andy Flower and captain Alastair Cook both said they had misjudged the pitch, and changes were made to the team ahead of the second Test. Panesar was selected for the second Test replacing Tim Bresnan, and he took 5–129 in the first innings, and 6–81 in the second, career best match figures of 11–210, and only the second time he has taken ten wickets in a match. This was also the first time since Hedley Verity in 1934 that an English spinner had taken 10 wickets in a match in India. England went on to level the series at one all by winning the match by ten wickets. In the third Test as he took five wickets in the match, including 4–90 in the first Innings. England went on to win the match by seven wickets and lead the series 2–1 with one Test remaining. In the final Test in Nagpur, Panesar was not as successful with the ball only taking 1–81 on a flat pitch. The match ended in a draw and England won the series 2–1. By winning the series England became the first team since 2004 to beat India on their home soil, and the first England team since the 1984–85 tour to beat India in India. Panesar ended the series with 17 wickets.

=== England in New Zealand, 2013 ===
Panesar was called up to the 15-man squad for the winter tour of New Zealand with the first Test starting on 6 March. Panesar was the leading spinner of the Test part of the tour as Graeme Swann had to pull out requiring surgery on a recurring elbow injury. Panesar took 5 wickets over the series.

== Achievements ==
=== Awards ===
- NBC Denis Compton Award 2001
- Wisden Cricketer of the Year 2007
- Beard of the Year 2006 by the Beard Liberation Front.
- Ashes Member 2006–07, 2009, 2010–11
- Ashes Winner 2009, 2010–11
- (Padmore Medal) 2006 England v Pakistan test series

=== Career best performances ===
	Batting				Bowling			
	Score	Fixture	Venue	Season	Figures	Fixture	Venue	Season
First-class	46*	Sussex v Middlesex	County Cricket Ground, Hove	2010	7/60	Sussex v Somerset	County Ground, Taunton	2012
List A	17*	Northamptonshire v Leicestershire	County Cricket Ground, Northampton	2008	5/20	ECB National Academy v Sri Lanka A	Nondescripts Cricket Club Ground	2003
T20	3*	Northamptonshire v Glamorgan	SWALEC Stadium	2008	3/14	Sussex v Gloucestershire	County Cricket Ground, Bristol	2011

== Personal life ==
Panesar has been quoted as saying, "I follow Sikhism, and maybe I’ve channelled the discipline that religion creates into my cricket. There's discipline with any religion, and you can take it into a game or into anything else". Panesar has uncut hair and a full-length beard, which is a fundamental part of the Sikh identity and way of life. He won the 2006 Beard of the Year competition run by the Beard Liberation Front.

In August 2013 Panesar was fined after he urinated on a doorman following his ejection from a Brighton club. Having admitted that he had broken the Sikh vow not to drink alcohol, combined with his poor form, the incident contributed to his leaving Sussex and being loaned to Essex.

After he rejoined Northamptonshire in 2016, Panesar opened up about the mental illness that he had been suffering, speaking in the media about his acceptance to use medication to help him cope with feelings of paranoia and anxiety that came after a loss of confidence.

He was married to Gursharan Rattan which ended in divorce. Panesar released his autobiography Monty Panesar: The Full Monty for White Owl Books in May 2019.

Following his retirement from cricket, Panesar studied Sports Journalism at St. Mary's University London, where he learnt the trade from Neil Kingston. Panesar is also an Overseas Citizen of India.

In April 2024, Panesar announced his intention to stand for election as the next MP for Ealing Southall in the next UK General Election, as a candidate from the Workers Party of Britain, led by George Galloway: “When I played for England there was so much support from the fans and the whole nation when they put me where I am today, it’s my turn now to actually help the working-class people, whatever problems they have,” he remarked upon announcing his candidacy, “the gap between the rich and the poor is getting bigger and bigger.” He withdrew his candidacy a week later.

== See also ==
- Patiala House, Indian sports film inspired by Panesar's life
- List of British Sikhs
