= National Labour Party (Czechoslovakia, 1938) =

National Labour Party Národní strana práce
- Leader: Antonín Hampl
- Founded: December 11, 1938
- Dissolved: March 31, 1939 (banned)
- Merger of: ČSSD, part of ČSNS
- Merged into: National Partnership
- Headquarters: Prague, Czechoslovakia
- Newspaper: Národní práce
- Ideology: Social democracy Left-wing nationalism
- Political position: Left-wing
- Colours: Red

The National Labour Party (Národní strana práce) was one of two identically named parties in Czechoslovakia. It was founded on 11 December 1938 as a merger of the Czechoslovak Social Democratic Party with the left wing of the Czechoslovak National Social Party. The purpose of the party was to unify the non-communist left and, within the framework of the Second Czechoslovak Republic, to function as a democratic opposition against the authoritarian tendencies of the Party of National Unity, which constituted the government. An identically named party (Národní strana práce) had previously existed in Czechoslovakia from 1925 to 1930.

The National Labour Party was forced to disband in late March 1939, after the liquidation of Czechoslovakia as an independent state.

38 members of the Chamber of Deputies of Czechoslovakia belonged to the National Labour Party. These were Ján Bečko, Rudolf Bechyně, Ferdinand Benda, Karel Brožík, Ivan Dérer, František Dlouhý, Josef Ešner, Antonín Hampl, Jaroslav Hladký, Rudolf Chalupa, Václav Jaša, Marie Jurnečková-Vorlová, Robert Klein, Josef Kopasz, Jan Blahoslav Kozák, Felix Kučera, Jaroslav Kučera, Alois Langer, Bohumil Laušman, Josef Macek, Josef Mareš, Ivan Markovič, Alfréd Meissner, Karel Moudrý, Jaromír Nečas, František Němec, František Neumeister, František Nový, Josef Patejdl, Luděk Pik, Jakub Polach, Antonín Remeš, Ferdinand Richter, Antonín Srba, Josef Stivín, Rudolf Tayerle, František Tymeš and Leopold Vaverka.

19 members of the Senate of Czechoslovakia belonged to the National Labour Party. These were Vilém Brodecký, Felix Časný, Vojtěch Dundr, Rudolf Havlík, Josef Chalupník, Betty Karpíšková, Tomáš Korvas, Emma Koutková, Alois Kříž, Rudolf Macek, František Modráček, František Müller, Jindřich Nentvich, Václav Němeček, Ján Pocisk, František Soukup, František Vácha, Arnošt Winter and František Zimák.
