= Ivan Dérer =

Slovak politician, lawyer, journalist, and regional chairman

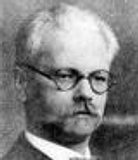

Minister of Justice of Czechoslovakia
- In office 14 February 1934 – 22 September 1938
- Preceded by: Alfréd Meissner
- Succeeded by: Vladimír Fajnor

Minister of Education of Czechoslovakia
- In office 7 December 1929 – 14 February 1934
- Preceded by: Anton Štefánek
- Succeeded by: Jan Krčmář

Personal details
- Born: 2 March 1884 Malacka,, Pozsony County, Kingdom of Hungary (now Malacky, Slovakia)
- Died: 10 March 1973 (aged 89) Prague, Czechoslovakia (now Czech Republic)
- Party: ČSDSD; SP
- Education: Budapest University

Ivan Dérer (2 March 1884 in Malacka, Kingdom of Hungary – 10 March 1973 in Prague, Czechoslovakia) was a prominent Slovak politician, lawyer, journalist and regional chairman of the Czechoslovak Social Democratic Workers' Party in Slovakia. Serving in 1920 as Minister for Administration of Slovakia, from 1929 to 1934 as Minister of Education, and from 1934 to 1938 as Minister of Justice. He was one of the signers of Martin Declaration in 1918, and as a member of the Slovak National Council, he brought this document to Prague, where he was appointed as a member of the Revolutionary National Assembly. He was affiliatied with the Hlasists, a group of Slovak followers of T. G. Masaryk. Dérer was also supporter of Czechoslovakism and strongly opposed Slovak separatism and clerofascism (ľuďáks).

His son, Vladimir Derer was a prominent British Labour Party activist who founded the influential Campaign for Labour Party Democracy.
