= Keith Flett =

British historian

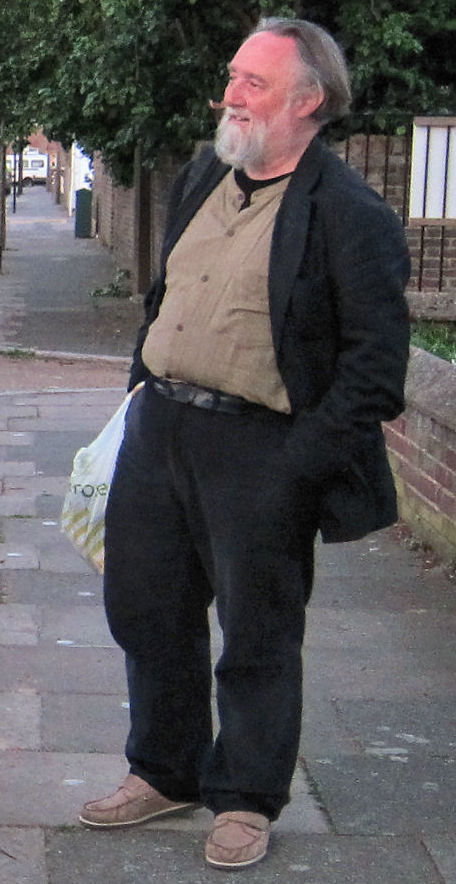
Flett in 2012

Keith Flett (born 31 October 1956) is a British socialist historian and a prolific letter writer in the British press.

== Activities ==
Letters from "Keith Flett, London N17" are regularly published in the press, literary and political journals, advancing his favoured causes of socialism and the Beard Liberation Front. Flett's contributions (sometimes termed "fletters") appear in the letters pages of the London Review of Books, Private Eye, New Statesman, The Morning Star, What's Brewing and Tribune. Flett has claimed that his first published letter was in The Guardian, criticising an article by Eric Hobsbawm on Soviet history.

Flett has written and edited a number of history books. He has also written for the left-wing newspaper the Socialist Worker and is an active supporter of the Socialist Workers Party. He is convenor of the London Socialist Historians Group and the president of the Haringey Trades Council.

Flett is the 'organiser' of the Beard Liberation Front (which campaigns against the trend of New Labour politicians removing their facial hair to show a more moderate, presentable, image to the public). He is also associated with Campaign for Real Conkers. In this, Flett forms part of a British satirical tradition of using tongue-in-cheek flippancy to make more serious political points.

Flett is a real ale enthusiast and has been a member of CAMRA since 1974.

== Philosophy of activism ==
Flett has emphasised the importance of being involved in the affairs of one's homeland. In August 2010 he wrote:

In the age of Twitter, Facebook, blogs, texts and YouTube, why bother to write a letter to the editor? I use all the above formats, but it is only when I have a letter published in a national paper that people stop me to say: "I saw your letter". They hardly ever say "I saw your tweet" or "I saw your post on Facebook".

The reason is obvious: a letter in the Guardian or Independent will reach many thousands of people. Other, newer media will reach hundreds if you are lucky. Letters to the editor deliver impact – one of the reasons why those of us who are politically active want to impart our thoughts to a wider audience in the first place.

In June 2015, Flett endorsed Jeremy Corbyn's campaign in the Labour Party leadership election.

== Publications ==
- The Twentieth Century: A Century of Wars and Revolutions (ed. with David Renton). Rivers Oram Press, 2000. ISBN 1-85489-126-X.
- New Approaches to Socialist History (ed. with David Renton). New Clarion Press, 2003. ISBN 1-873797-41-9.
- Chartism After 1848 : The Working Class and the Politics of Radical Education (Chartist Studies series). Merlin Press, 2005. ISBN 0-85036-544-9.
- 1956 and All That (editor). Cambridge Scholars Press, 2007. ISBN 1-84718-184-8
- A History of Riots (editor). Cambridge Scholars Press, 2015. ISBN 9781443870818

== References and sources ==
Sources

- Routledge, Paul, Bumper Book of British Lefties, 2003, Politicos (ISBN 1-84275-064-X)
- BBC: Pupils wear goggles for conkers, 4/10/2004
- Flett, Keith. My kind of decade in The Pink Paper, 14 November 1997, issue 507, p. 21 qv
- BBC reports on Beard Liberation Front awards
- Socialists and the origins of Labour by Keith Flett
- May Day: Festival for the workers (2002 article by Keith Flett)
