= Labour CND =

Part of the British Campaign for Nuclear Disarmament

- Abbreviation: LCND
- Formation: 1979; 47 years ago
- Location: United Kingdom
- Region served: United Kingdom
- Main organ: Campaign for Nuclear Disarmament
- Parent organisation: Labour Party
- Affiliations: Centre-Left Grassroots Alliance
- Website: www.labourcnd.org.uk

Labour CND (Lab CND) is a 'Specialist Section' of Campaign for Nuclear Disarmament, specifically relating to CND-supporting members the Labour Party.

== History ==
Labour CND was established in 1979 and exists to this day. High-profile members of Labour CND include the former Leader of the Labour Party and Leader of the Opposition Jeremy Corbyn MP, former MPs Alice Mahon and until his death in 2019, Walter Wolfgang. Former Prime Minister Tony Blair and former Foreign Secretary Jack Straw were once members as young MPs.
