= Beard Liberation Front =

British interest group

The Beard Liberation Front (BLF) is a British interest group which campaigns in support of beards and opposes pogonophobic discrimination against those who wear them. It was founded in 1995 by socialist historian Keith Flett who continues to organise and represent the organisation. Apart from its numerous campaigns in support of beards and against pogonophobia in the workplace and discrimination against those who wear beards as part of their religion, it currently hosts the annual Beard of the Year award.

On the face of it, the campaign is semi-humorous, with its outwardly frivolous aims, its occasionally outlandish claims of discrimination and conspiracy, and its founder, who is also the spokesman for the Campaign for Real Conkers. However, the organisation has drawn attention to more serious issues, having spoken out against, among other incidents, the suspension of a fireman for refusing to shave off his goatee and the banning of beards among ExxonMobil oil workers (in both cases employers claimed that beards interfered with breathing apparatus). Flett believes that an issue of "real discrimination" exists against men with beards. Although he admits that a beard, unlike race and gender, is a matter of choice, he has claimed that beardism is associated with more serious forms of discrimination:

Those employers who ban their male workers from having beards – a growing number, incidentally – are also the same employers who demand that their female workers wear skirts not trousers, and who rigorously discriminate when it comes to annual appraisal time against anyone who does not conform to the stereotype of a young, single white man in a suit.

The size of the organisation is unknown; Flett refers to the organisation as "an informal network" and has claimed "a few hundred supporters" in the past. He is the organisation's sole spokesman in the media.

== Campaigns ==
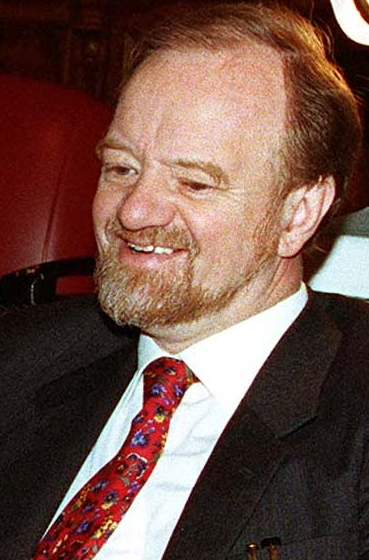
Robin Cook, first modern Foreign Secretary to sport a beard

On the occasion of its founding, Keith Flett claimed that "Beards are politically progressive. All the great revolutionary socialists had a beard. Stalin had a moustache." The BLF soon took up the cause of beards in British politics. In 1996 the BLF called for a bearded man to be appointed to the Cabinet. According to Independent diarist Eagle Eye, sources from the Labour Party, then in opposition, promised that if they were elected, the cabinet would include the first bearded minister since Baron Passfield in 1929. Upon Labour's victory in the general election a year later, the bearded Robin Cook was duly appointed Foreign Secretary. Since then, however, the BLF has regarded New Labour as obsessed with a clean-shaven image, with some notable exceptions (including David Blunkett and Charles Clarke).

In 1998 the BLF expressed outrage at actor Sean Connery being denied a knighthood, claiming that "normally reliable New Labour sources" had told them that the reason was his beard. Connery himself said that his knighthood was delayed because of his support for Scottish independence, while others pointed out his tax exile status and previous remarks that some complained condoned violence against women. Connery was eventually knighted in 2000.

In 2000 the BLF joined the anti-capitalist May Day protests with a "mass beard waggle", decrying the waste of natural resources involved in producing shaving foam and brushes. It also claimed that Robert Burns had a beard, and that contemporary pictures of him which depict the Scottish poet as clean-shaven were a manufactured image designed to make him more popular to the English. The Burns Federation said that there was no evidence to support Flett's claims, and said that he was "talking through his beard".

In 2002 the BLF called for a semi-boycott of the second Harry Potter film Harry Potter and the Chamber of Secrets, citing the continued presence of obviously fake beards worn by actors Robbie Coltrane and Richard Harris. Flett claimed that the Christmas season was the worst time of year for beardist taunts, with the Potter movies adding to the ammunition already given by Father Christmas. Acknowledging that the pressure from beardies' children would be too great to consider an outright boycott, he said that supporters were merely being encouraged to hiss and boo at the screen.

In 2006 the BLF joined the ranks of organisations issuing health advice during the record-breaking heat wave by advising beard-wearers to trim their beards, cover them with handkerchiefs and to keep them cool by placing them "briefly in the freezer department of a fridge or dipping [them] in a pint of real ale".

The BLF boycotted the 2007 World Beard and Moustache Championships as they said the event was over obsessive about the cutting and styling of whiskers rather than the pure cultivation of beards. They were also angered by the Handlebar Club who were hosting the event because of their full club membership ban of those who possess a beard of any description. Handlebar moustache wearer and satirist Michael "Atters" Attree who was Honorable Chairman and Master of Ceremonies of the 2007 championships (and sits upon the committee of the Handlebar Club) said that the BLF's attitude towards his London-based club's handling of the WBMC was "Nonsense and utter Poppycock." He stated: "One's personal grooming is of the utmost importance if one is to be a gentleman. Often it's the beard clubs that have been the WBMC hosts. We are just showing the beardies how to do it properly." Commenting on the Socialist aspirations of the BLF, Attree stated: "I'd rather be shot by a moustachioed fascist than bored to death by the BLF".

In 2007 during the Labour leadership campaign, the Beard Liberation Front held group discussions and decided to endorse Charles Clarke for the position, although he eventually announced he was not standing and would be backing Gordon Brown. Organiser Keith Flett was reported as saying:

He has a very recognisable public persona and it is a million miles from the clean shaven man in a suit image that characterises the Blair and Brown years and which both David Cameron and Sir Menzies Campbell copy. We believe Britain is ready for a bearded PM.

In June 2010 Keith Flett announced that the BLF had set the 2010 Beards and Sandals season to run from 6 June to 31 August.

== Beard of the Year ==
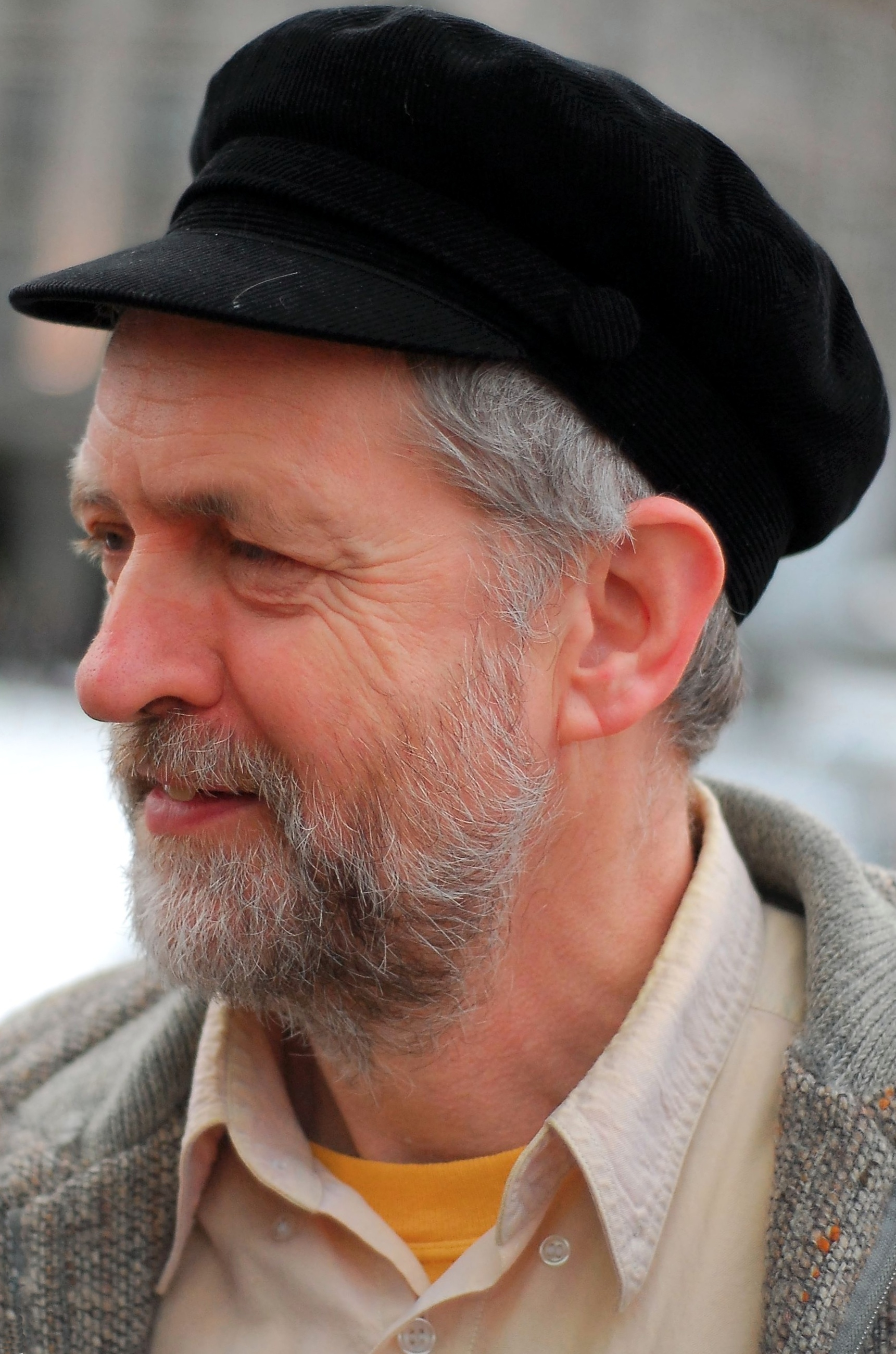
Jeremy Corbyn, 2001's Beard of the Year

In 2000, Frank Dobson was named "Beard 2000", amid controversy over his claim that Labour spin doctors had told him to shave off his prize-winning beard for the upcoming elections for Mayor of London. Dobson said that he had told them to "Stick it up their wickit".

Labour MP Jeremy Corbyn, who considered his beard "a form of dissent" against New Labour, defeated Rolf Harris to win 2001's award.

2002's winner was Education Secretary Charles Clarke, who beat comedian Ricky Gervais and Archbishop of Canterbury Rowan Williams for the title, although Flett suggested that his beard was probably a "pragmatic" one to conceal multiple double chins.

The 2004 Beard of the Year was held jointly by cricketer Andrew Flintoff and NATFHE union leader Paul Mackney, due to the close polling between them.

After the English cricket team regained the Ashes for the first time in sixteen years, Andrew Flintoff won the award again in 2005, this time unshared, to go with his BBC Sports Personality of the Year award and his MBE. The Lord of the Rings director Peter Jackson came second, while former joint-winner Paul Mackney was pushed into third.

England's loss of the Ashes the following year did not prevent the 2006 award going to a cricketer for the third year running; this time to England spin-bowler Monty Panesar, who narrowly won with 30 percent of the vote. Cuban President Fidel Castro was second with 29 percent; Paul Mackney was again third, tying with Archbishop of Canterbury Rowan Williams with 10 percent each.

Australian all-rounder Andrew Symonds and Sri Lankan spinner Muttiah Muralitharan shared the award for Beard of the cricket World Cup 2007, with Panesar the runner-up.

In 2007 the Beard of the Year was awarded to Robert Plant, the lead singer from Led Zeppelin.

Rowan Williams, the Archbishop of Canterbury made a comeback to win 2008's Beard of the Year from Prince William.

In 2009 Rage Against the Machine vocalist Zach de la Rocha added Beard of the Year to the band's Christmas Number One. He defeated the Slovene philosopher Slavoj Žižek.

2010's Beard of the Year was Sinn Féin President Gerry Adams.

The winner in 2011 was writer and restaurant critic Jay Rayner.

2012 saw the award presented to journalist and radio broadcaster Robin Lustig.

Michael Eavis, who organises the Glastonbury Festival was awarded Beard of the Noughties, beating former Cuban leader Fidel Castro. Keith Flett said "Both Eavis and Castro have taken a back seat towards the end of the decade but their beards remain iconic. Michael Eavis is a true hirsute icon of the Noughties and he beat Castro to the accolade by the merest whisker."

In 2013 Gareth Malone won the Beard of the Year. He beat John Hurt, Geoff Parling, and Jeremy Paxman, who made it to the shortlist, but fell outside the top 3, despite having one of the most discussed beards of 2013.

2013 also saw the first St. David's Day Beard of Wales award, which went to Adam Jones. Leigh Halfpenny won in 2014, and Joe Ledley won in 2016. 2015 was won jointly by brewer Toby Copestake and musician Chris Fox. The latter also came second in 2016 and won outright in 2017.

Winners in the 2020s include cricketer Mooen Ali in 2022, and Mayor of North Tyne Jamie Driscoll in 2023. 2021 saw Michael Rosen become the first consecutive winner, having been joint 2020 winner alongside Michael Sheen.

== Units outside Britain ==
In March 2012, Keith Flett corresponded with Zorko Sirotić, Croatian visual artist, and appointed him head of the BLF's Central and Eastern Europe unit. Flett announced this via his Twitter page on 9 March.

== See also ==
- Pogonophobia
