= Centre-Left Grassroots Alliance =

Group on UK Labour's administrative committee

- Abbreviation: CLGA
- Formation: 1998; 28 years ago
- Location: United Kingdom
- Affiliations: Momentum; Campaign for Labour Party Democracy; Labour Representation Committee; Jewish Voice for Labour; Labour Campaign for Nuclear Disarmament; Labour Briefing Co-op; Left Futures; Labour Assembly Against Austerity; Red Labour; Grassroots Black Left; Kashmiris for Labour; Welsh Labour Grassroots; Campaign for Socialism; Labour Women Leading
- Website: www.clga.org.uk

The Centre-Left Grassroots Alliance (CLGA) is a left-wing group of elected members on the Labour Party's National Executive Committee, founded in 1998. They represent members from a broad spectrum of the Labour membership, ranging from the centre-left to those on the left-wing.

== History ==
=== Founding ===
The Centre-Left Grassroots Alliance's founding groups were originally Labour Reform, a centre-left democratic group within the Party founded at a meeting in Birmingham in November 1995, and the Campaign for Labour Party Democracy, the left wing democratic grouping, who subsequently brought in other more left-wing groupings from within the Labour Party. Private talks with trades union representatives to build a broader base had failed on union demands and this initiated the inclusion of a much broader left group from the grassroots, including Labour Left Briefing [Liz Davies] and the then-Editor of Tribune, Mark Seddon. Prominent founding members also include Ann Black and Andy Howell. Successful efforts were also made to include the Scottish Left.

The first Co-ordinator [one term only] was Tim Pendry who was Vice Chair of Labour Reform and the Alliance originally restricted itself to issues of party democracy, resisting attempts to put in place a left policy platform in order to be inclusive of constituency feeling from the centre ground. Labour Reform was originally associated with the What's Left Group of MPs and CLPD with the Campaign Group of MPs but liaison with What's Left ended on attempts to dictate terms to the grassroots and the Co-ordinator liaised solely with the Campaign Group during the latter stages of the campaign.

The first election resulted in four of the six available constituency seats going to the Alliance despite significantly less resources being available to the Alliance and was notable for getting the editorial backing of the Guardian.

=== Corbyn-era and rise of the left in Labour ===
In 2018 the CGLA put up a full slate of nine candidates, all of which were elected.

In 2020, The groups of the CLGA agreed a slate called "Grassroots Voice", which included six representative on the nine CLP seats and a representative for the disabled and youth seats. Changes to the voting system means they had to provide a reduced slate. The six CLP representatives are Ann Henderson, Gemma Bolton, Laura Pidcock, Mish Rahman, Nadia Jama and Yasmine Dar, the disabled rep is Ella Morrison and the Young Labour rep is Lara McNeill. Only Dar, McNeill and Henderson were on the NEC previously. There were rumours that other candidates chosen by the CLGA included Laura Alvarez, Jeremy Corbyn's wife, and James Schneider, founder of Momentum and former member of Corbyn's staff. The selection process saw 450 constituency labour parties participate, the high turnout of CLPs in Labour's history. 42% of selection nominations went to the Grassroots Voice CLP slate. The result saw the 7 candidates winning; 5 of the 6 candidates in the CLP section and the disability and youth reps. The candidates in the CLP section won a combined amount of 37% of first preference votes.

In 2021, all six of the CLGA's backed candidates for the newly created National Women's Committee were elected. These candidates were Solma Ahmed, Ekua Bayunu, Mandy Clare, Tricia Duncan, Pamela Fitzpatrick and Chloe Hopkins.

== Policy ==
The current policy of the Centre-Left Grassroots Alliance is broadly left-wing. They want greater powers for Constituency Labour Parties and individual members in the National Policy Forum; to maintain the power of the party conference; to resist privatisation in the National Health Service; to nationalise the railways and to increase powers for local government.

== Organisations ==
Organisations associated with the Centre-Left Grassroots Alliance include:

- Momentum
- Campaign for Labour Party Democracy (CLPD)
- Labour Representation Committee (LRC)
- Jewish Voice for Labour (JVL)
- Labour Campaign for Nuclear Disarmament (LCND)
- Labour Briefing Co-op
- Left Futures
- Labour Assembly Against Austerity (LAAA)
- Red Labour
- Grassroots Black Left (GBL)
- Kashmiris for Labour
- Welsh Labour Grassroots (WLG)
- Campaign for Socialism (CfS)
- Labour Women Leading (LWL)
