= Campaign for Labour Party Democracy =

UK political pressure group

- Abbreviation: CLPD
- Formation: 1973; 53 years ago
- Founder: Vladimir Derer
- Location: United Kingdom
- Chair: Gemma Bolton
- Affiliations: Centre-Left Grassroots Alliance
- Website: clpd.org.uk

The Campaign for Labour Party Democracy (CLPD) is a group of Labour Party activists campaigning for changes to the constitution and rules of the Labour Party to ensure that Labour MPs and Labour governments enact policies agreeable to the party membership.

== History ==
CLPD was founded by Labour Party activists in 1973, with support from about ten Labour MPs, and its first President was Frank Allaun. A leading co-founder was Vladimir Derer, and his house in Golders Green became CLPD's headquarters for about twenty-five years. A key reason for its formation was that the 1960s Labour governments ignored Labour Party Conference decisions on key domestic and international issues.

Amongst the changes desired were mandatory reselection of MPs, for the party leader to be elected on a franchise wider than MPs and for the party manifesto to be drafted by the National Executive Committee rather than the parliamentary leadership. Tony Benn was the foremost advocate of CLPD demands. In the late 1970s, CLPD had about 450 members and nearly 300 affiliated organisations.

In the 1980s, the CLPD became the first Labour organisation to call for more representation of women within the party, which eventually led to all-women shortlists to select candidates being adopted in the Labour Party.

In 1983, the activities of the CLPD were the subject of a BBC hour-long docudrama, 'The Campaign'.

At the 2014 Labour Party Conference a CLPD motion achieved one member, one vote elections for the Constituency Labour Party section of the Conference Arrangements Committee, after having earlier achieving this for the National Policy Forum.

In September 2025, CLPD chair Lizzy Ali resigned from the Labour Party, together with twenty other members of Leyton and Wanstead CLP, citing their "anger, frustration and astonishment as the current dishonest leadership has abandoned the principles the Labour Party should stand on".

== Recent developments ==
In 2015, CLPD member Jeremy Corbyn was elected as Leader of the Labour Party, and took forward the CLPD agenda of increasing democracy in the Labour Party by putting forward reforms to increase the ability of the Party Conference to determine Labour Party policy. Corbyn did not advocate mandatory reselection for Labour MPs during his term as Labour leader – a demand that he, along with Tony Benn and other members of the CLPD, had made in the 1980s – but because of the Conservative government's constituency boundary redrawing, all MPs intending to stand again were due to face reselection by October 2018 anyway.

== See also ==
- Centre-Left Grassroots Alliance
- Labour Representation Committee (2004)
- Momentum (organisation)
- Deselection of Labour MPs
