= Popular socialism (Central Europe) =

Left-wing nationalist ideology

Popular socialism (German: Volkssozialismus; Czech: Národní socialismus; Slovene: Narodni socializem) is a distinct socialist ideology in Central Europe with an origin in Austria-Hungary. Central European popular socialism differs from popular socialism in Nordic countries, which is known for a greater left-wing emphasis. With its origin in the 1890s, popular socialism in Central Europe is traditionally associated with democratic and classical radical politics, linking liberal socialism with left-wing nationalism in each respective country.

Popular socialism has traditionally been a centre-left political ideology influential in the politics of Austria-Hungary and its successor states, especially in Czech politics and Slovenian politics. Popular socialist economic beliefs were traditionally close to guild socialism, as they maintained their own trade unions. In practical politics, it is characterized by gradual reformism of state laws and the economy. Popular socialism is viewed by its advocates as an idealist socialism rather than the materialist socialism espoused by Marxism. Popular socialism was also referred to as Czech socialism and later Czechoslovak socialism in Czechoslovakia, and Yugoslav socialism in Yugoslavia.

== Etymology ==
Popular socialism in Czech is called národní socialismus (lit. 'national socialism'), in Slovene as narodni socializem and in German as Volkssozialismus. The adjective narodni in Slavic languages is primarily translated from Czech and Slovene into English as national, and in Serbo-Croatian and Ukrainian it is usually translated as people's. This can cause confusion in distinguishing the ideology, because in Czech, the word national is variously translated as národní (English: 'soft national') and nacionální (English: 'hard national'). Due to that, Czech historiography distinguishes the democratic ideology of popular socialism as národní socialismus, while German Nazism is nacionální socialismus. In the context of Germany, popular socialism should also be distinguished from the ultranationalist Strasserism, as in the 1930s that movement also (rarely) referred to itself as Volkssozialismus.

== Symbolism ==
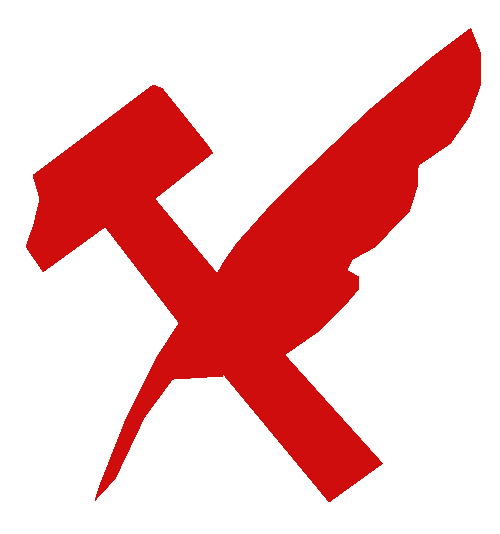
The quill and hammer, a traditional symbol of popular socialism in Czechoslovakia and Yugoslavia, that also represents an association with the radical current, as it shares its symbolism with the Radical Civic Union in Argentina

The quill and hammer are traditional symbols of popular socialism, both in Czechoslovakia and Yugoslavia. These symbols also manifest an association with classical radicalism, as the Czech National Social Party (ČSNS) was a member of the Radical International. They symbolize the traditional supporters of the movement, with the quill representing clerks and intelligentsia, and the hammer representing workers. Historically, they have been used even before the establishment of the ČSNS in 1897, as they were used as symbols of Czech self-help consumer associations for workers associated with economist František Ladislav Chleborád. Their history dates back to the 1870s and they are considered a predecessor to the movement. In the early 20th century, the movement was also associated with railway workers across Austria-Hungary.

== History ==
=== Foundation ===
The party and ideology emerged in 1897 as opposed to the social democracy of the Czech Social Democratic Party, which supported Marxist internationalism and Austromarxism. The party then also rose up against the politics of major Czech parties, especially the Young Czech Party, which was opposed as lacking enough social reform politics, and not being in accordance with the call for greater social justice. The beginning of the movement is associated with the foundation of the Czech National Social Party in 1897. Besides the Czech lands, the ideology spread across the Cisleithanian part of Austria-Hungary. The socialist and nationalist ideology was represented by the leading motto: "Equality of Nations, Equality Within the Nation" (Rovnost národů, rovnost v národě). They were ideologically opposed to further centralization of power in Vienna. Outside the Czech lands, organizations of the ČSNS were gradually created in many regions of Austria-Hungary. Official land organizations were also formed in Lower Austria and Upper Austria, which, after the dissolution of Austria-Hungary, became the basis for the Czechoslovak party in the First Austrian Republic after 1919. Branches of the party also existed in Istria. After 1900, the youth wing of the ČSNS was associated with the International Anti-Militarist Association. Their emphasis on antimilitarism was persecuted by the Austrian authorities and led to a trial of the Czech Antimilitarist Congress in Prague in 1909, which led to the imprisonment of many youth members. After the beginning of World War I the ČSNS was banned, and many members including party leader Václav Klofáč were imprisoned. Popular socialist politics were present in various other organizations like trade unions, corporations for railway workers, youth organizations and health insurance corporations. Progressive activities led to awareness of popular socialism elsewhere in the empire, not just in the Czech lands. This became prominent especially among Slovenes, when prominent figure Anton Pesek became inspired by popular socialism from the original Czech movement and in 1919 founded the People's Socialist Party in newly-formed Yugoslavia.

=== Interwar evolution ===
In the short revolutionary period after 1918, the Czechoslovak popular socialist movement also included anarchist members who joined the party from anarchist associations, as the party turned more to the left. In the 1920s, the ČSNS (by that time the Czechoslovak National Socialist Party) was for a short period an observer party of the Labour and Socialist International (LSI) along with the Czech Social Democratic Party. Later in the decade, the party exited the LSI and transferred to the Radical International. After 1918, many Czech popular socialists also became adherents of Czechoslovakism, a motive for a unified nation of Czechs and Slovaks. Popular socialists gradually became adherents of the liberal political establishment of the Hrad, associated with the first president of Czechoslovakia, Tomáš Masaryk. This manifested in 1923, when Foreign Minister and one of the most important figures in the country, Edvard Beneš, joined the ČSNS.

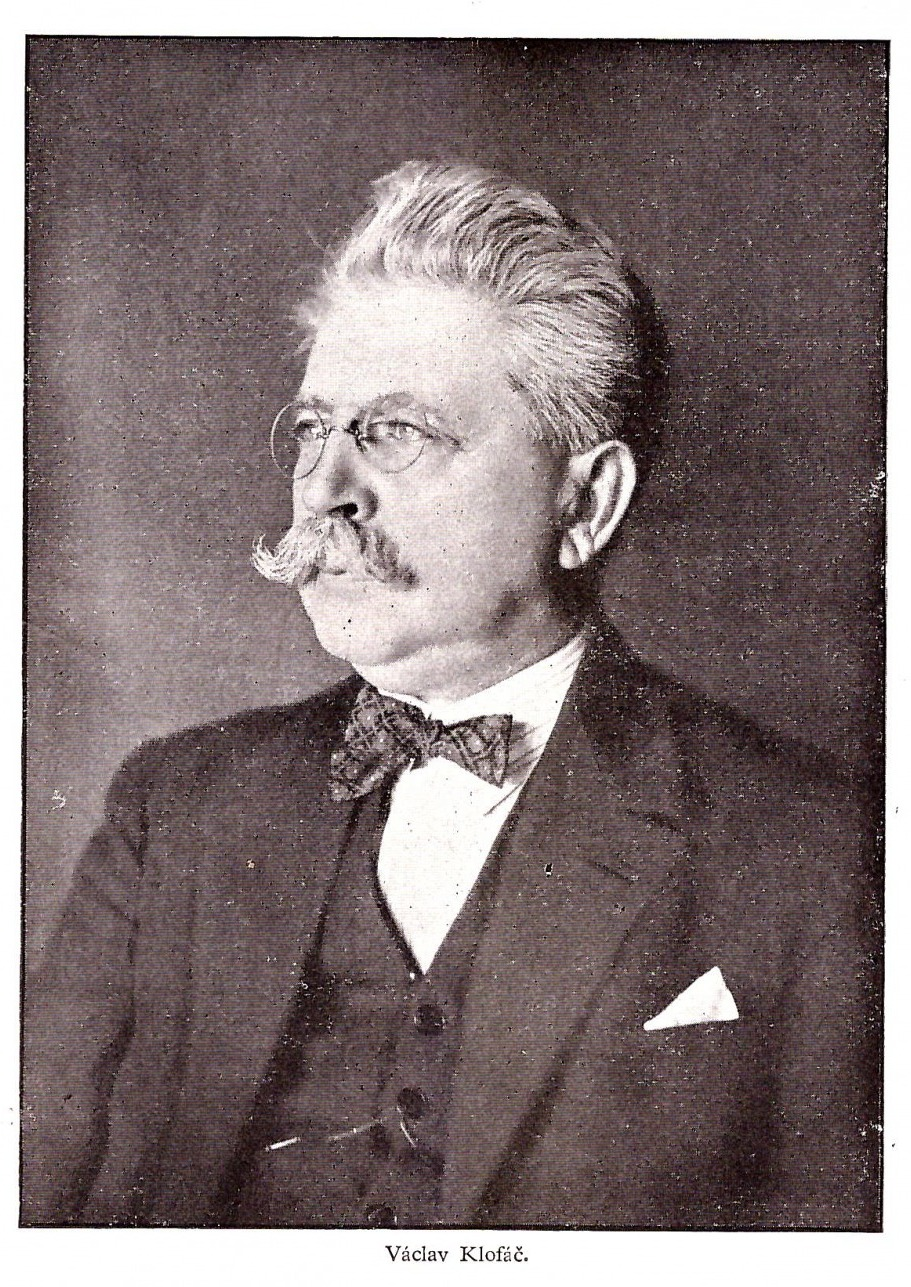
Czech politician Václav Klofáč (1868–1942)

Popular socialism also contained a Christian association with political Protestantism. Popular socialism in Czechoslovakia was associated with the Hussite tradition, as they considered the Hussites to be predecessors of modern socialism. The movement was partially an anti-Catholic camp that advocated anti-clericalism, as the Catholic Church was closely associated with Austro-Hungarian imperial rule. After 1920, popular socialism in Czechoslovakia was closely associated with the Czechoslovak Hussite Church. The Yugoslav People's Socialist Party was composed mainly of Slovene members, who also associated their views with anti-clericalism when they contrasted them with their main Catholic opponent, the Slovene People's Party. In Czechoslovakia demographically, popular socialism was strong in large urban areas such as Prague and Brno, where the party became a lead force in the city governments. The party was not very strong in rather agrarian Slovakia, although some intellectuals joined it, such as Slovak novelist and politician Jozef Gregor-Tajovský, who became a public figure of the cultural front for popular socialism in Slovakia. From 1920, the ČSNS participated in the Pětka, a bloc of the most prominent political parties in the government.

As Czechoslovakia represented a major country for émigrés from the countries of the former Russian Empire, the ČSNS traditionally maintained relations with exiled narodniks and trudoviks and their exile organizations. After the end of the Russian Civil War, the party also organized help for democratic socialists imprisoned by the Bolshevik regime in the Soviet Union. Foreign Minister and later President Beneš maintained a strong involvement in international institutions, for example as President of the Plenary Assembly of the League of Nations from 1935 to 1936. He maintained strong party cooperation with the Republican, Radical and Radical-Socialist Party in France. This was especially manifested by the party's membership in the Radical International. Beneš was also a supporter of the Paneuropean Union, which intended to defend democracy and support the unification of Europe. This manifested in 1930 by diplomatic support for an idea presented in the Assembly of the League of Nations by allied French Radical-Socialist statesman Aristide Briand, aiming towards European federation, which later manifested as the European Union.

=== World War II and afterwards ===
After the German occupation of Czechoslovakia in 1938, popular socialist ministers were part of the Czechoslovak government-in-exile in London. Many members of the party were part of the anti-Nazi resistance and many were sent to concentration camps. After 1945, the party was revived and joined the government of the united front. After the success of the Communists in the 1946 Czechoslovak parliamentary election, popular socialists became the strongest non-communist party. In the 1948 Czechoslovak coup d'état, popular socialism became the main force against the seizure of democracy by the Communists. After the takeover by the Communists, around 400,000 party members were expelled from the party and pro-Communist leadership took over the party and became a pro-regime bloc party that was renamed the Czechoslovak Socialist Party.

=== After 1989 ===
After the Velvet Revolution in 1989, the exiled party leadership returned from abroad and reunited with the party. Popular socialism in Czechoslovakia generally moved more towards social liberalism, as the main historic party became part of the Liberal-Social Union in 1991–1994 and in 1993–1997 was even officially renamed as the Liberal National Social Party. After the dissolution of Czechoslovakia and establishment of the Czech Republic in 1993, the party failed to gain electoral support and in 1996 dropped out of Parliament. In reaction to the demise of the original party, various other popular socialist parties started to emerge, but never succeeded in entering national politics.

== Feminism ==
Popular socialism is also associated with feminism. Especially in the era of the First Czechoslovak Republic, significant feminist figures such as Františka Plamínková, Luisa Landová-Štychová and Milada Horáková participated in the political sphere. Progressive positions manifested in the politics of the party in the government, such as subsidizing the building of housing for independent working women. Representatives of the party were included in the leadership of the Women's National Council. Inside the party direction towards equal status of women were represented also in party self-defence paramilitary Freedom Guard Union, where women units with military training preparation also existed.

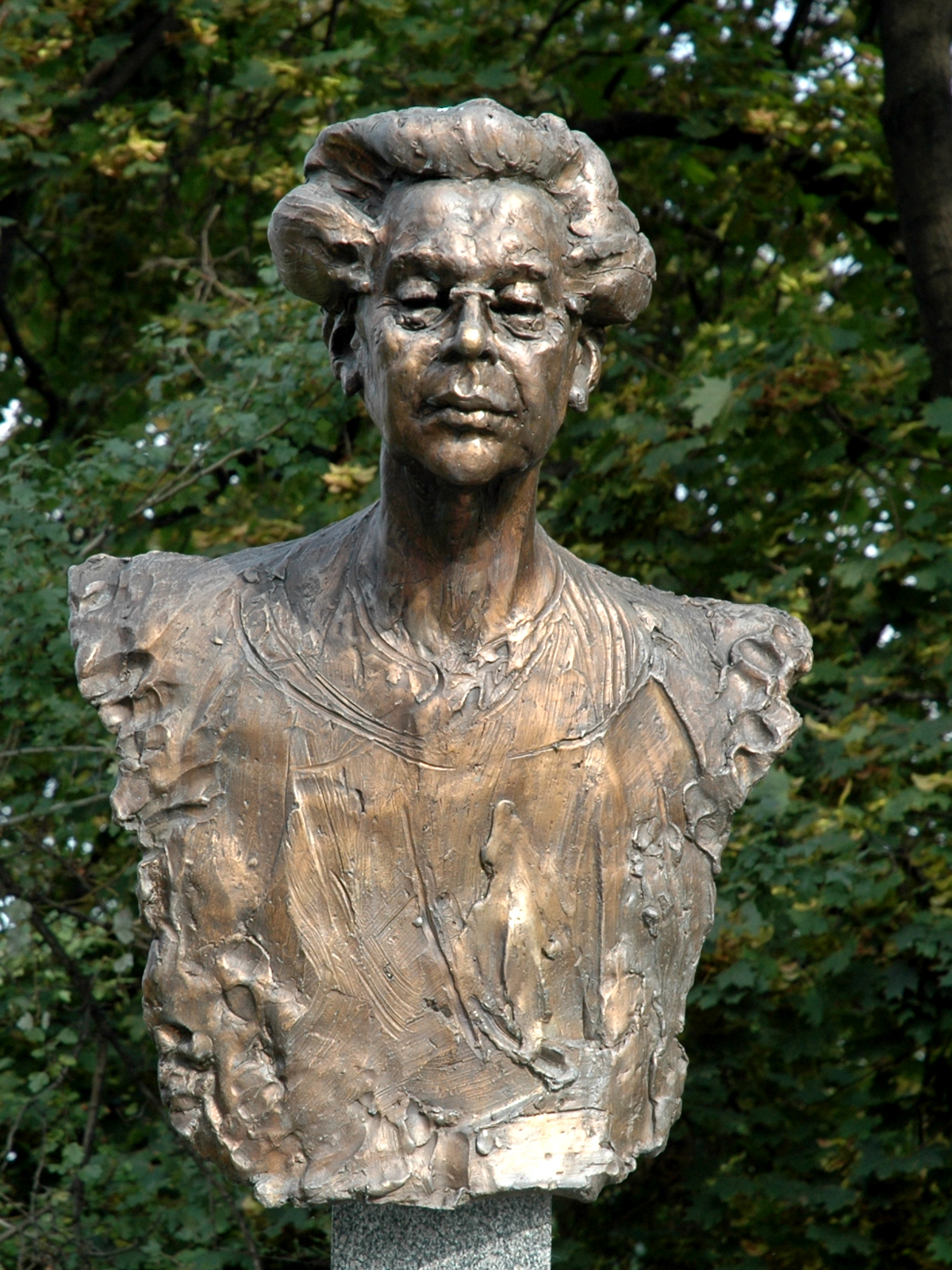
Monument of important popular socialist figure Milada Horáková in Prague, Czech Republic

== Anti-communist tradition ==
Popular socialism, as a non-Marxist ideology, has a tradition of anti-communism, as well as a tradition of calling on participation in a popular front along with other centrist and leftist parties. During World War II, that tradition led to the establishment of the National Front of Czechoslovakia in 1944. Democratic tradition became the main force in 1948, when the ČSNS resigned in protest against Stalinization of the police forces under communist Minister of Interior Václav Nosek. During the 1948 Czechoslovak coup d'état, popular socialism became the main force against the seizure of democracy by the Communist Party of Czechoslovakia. The Communist takeover was closely followed by the trial of popular socialist politician Milada Horáková in 1950, which was one of the biggest show trials of the Cold War era. She was sentenced along with others to execution on fabricated charges of conspiracy and treason. Many prominent figures in the West, including Albert Einstein, Vincent Auriol, Eleanor Roosevelt and Winston Churchill, petitioned for her life. After 1949, the ČSNS leadership-in-exile headed by Petr Zenkl became the strongest party represented in the Plenary Assembly of the Council of Free Czechoslovakia, a member organization of the Assembly of Captive European Nations in New York. All 400,000+ members were expelled from the party, and people appointed by the Communists took charge of the newly renamed Czechoslovak Socialist Party. The party then acted as a bloc party until the Velvet Revolution in 1989.

== Other influences ==
There are many similar movements, with possible influences from ideology in the region. One of these was Hapoel Hatzair, founded in 1905 by Ashkenazi Jewish immigrants to Palestine, which came mainly from the Central European and Eastern European regions. Their ideology was defined by the main ideologue of the movement Haim Arlosoroff as Jewish popular socialism, a non-Marxist socialism within the nationalist ideology of Zionism. Friendly relations with Zionism were later emphasized by Czech President Beneš, who encouraged holding Zionist Congresses in Czechoslovakia and strongly supported the foundation of the State of Israel in 1948. The Polish National Workers' Party, which participated in the Centrolew coalition from 1930, was an ally of popular socialist parties in both Czechoslovakia and Yugoslavia, with whom the party closely collaborated. In Lithuania, there was the liaudininkai movement. They are similarly referred to as "Volkssozialisten" in German or "národní socialisté" in Czech. In 1922, it merged with the Peasant Union which had a more rural voter base and ties to the Republican Party of Farmers and Peasants rather than ČSNS.

In the 1930s, Sudeten German Social Democrat Wenzel Jaksch represented German popular socialism (German: Volkssozialismus), as a faction of the German Social Democratic Workers' Party in the Czechoslovak Republic that participated in coalition governments along with Czechoslovak popular socialists from 1929 to 1938. His German nationalism within a social democratic framework was intended to be used as a weapon for democracy against Nazism, especially after Adolf Hitler's takeover of Germany in 1933 and rising popularity of the Nazi Sudeten German Party among Sudeten Germans. Jaksch's faction was criticized by social democratic internationalists in his party and abroad. Due to the rising threat from Nazi Germany in the late 1930s, Jaksch did not even refuse cooperation with Strasserism in a common anti-Hitler coalition. By 1938, his political faction had come into conflict with Czechoslovak authorities, which included the ČSNS as a governing party. After German occupation and Jaksch's failure to represent Sudeten Germans within the government-in-exile in London, he was unable to prevent the expulsion of Germans from Czechoslovakia after the end of World War II in 1945. After 1957, Jaksch was a leader of the Federation of Expellees in West Germany, and also represented an ideological faction within the Social Democratic Party of Germany.

== Political parties ==
Czech popular socialist parties in the 21st century vary primarily in their position towards the European Union and Transatlantic partnership.

=== Czechoslovakia ===
- Czech National Social Party (founded 1897)
- Carpatho-Russian Labour Party of Small Peasants and the Landless (1919–1939)

=== Yugoslavia ===
- People's Socialist Party (1919–1928)

=== Austria ===
- Czechoslovak National Socialist Party in the Republic of Austria (1919–1934) – (Barák Workers Association)

=== Czech Republic ===
- National Social Party – Czechoslovak National Socialist Party (1990–1997)
- Czechoslovak Socialist Party (1993–2025)
- Czech National Socialist Party (2005–2022)
- National Socialists – Left of the 21st century (2011–2022)
- Vision of National Socialists (2018–2020)
- Vision – National Socialists (2020–2025)
- National Social Party (founded 2024)

=== Other parties with similar factions ===
- National-Social Association (1896–1903)
- Social Political Party (1896–1919)
- Hapoel Hatzair (1905–1930)
- Labourist Popular-Socialist Party (1909–1918)
- Lithuanian Popular Socialist Union (1917–1918)
- Lithuanian Popular Socialist Democratic Party (1917–1922)
- National Workers' Party (1920–1937)
- Lithuanian Popular Peasants' Union (1922–1936)
- National Labour Party (1925–1930) – merged into the Czechoslovak National Socialist Party in 1930.
- German Social Democratic Workers' Party in the Czechoslovak Republic (1919–1938) – Popular socialist faction represented by Wenzel Jaksch, who became party chairman in 1938.
- Lithuanian Peasant Popular Union (founded 2001) – renamed to "Lithuanian Farmers and Greens Union" in 2012.
- Czech Social Democratic Party (founded 1878) – a split of the faction of Prime Minister Jiří Paroubek in 2011 led to the foundation of the National Socialists – Left of the 21st century.
- Stačilo! (founded 2024) – founded as an electoral alliance which included the ČSNS.

== See also ==
- Poporanism
