= Freedom Guard Union =

Czechoslovak paramilitary organization

- Svaz stráže svobody (Czech); Zväz stráže slobody (Slovak)
- President: Jaroslav Motyčka
- Chief: Josef Nestával; Antonín Kinkal
- Founded: 1932
- Dissolved: 1939
- Country: Czechoslovakia
- Headquarters: Hooverova 2, Prague, Czechoslovakia
- Ideology: Popular socialism Liberal socialism
- Political position: Centre-left
- Size: 10,000 (1934)
- Part of: Czechoslovak National Socialist Party
- Conflicts: Sudeten German uprising
- Flag

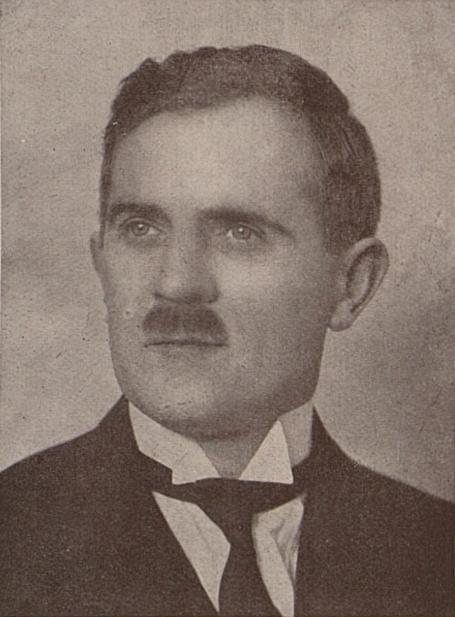
Jaroslav Motyčka, President of the Freedom Guard Union

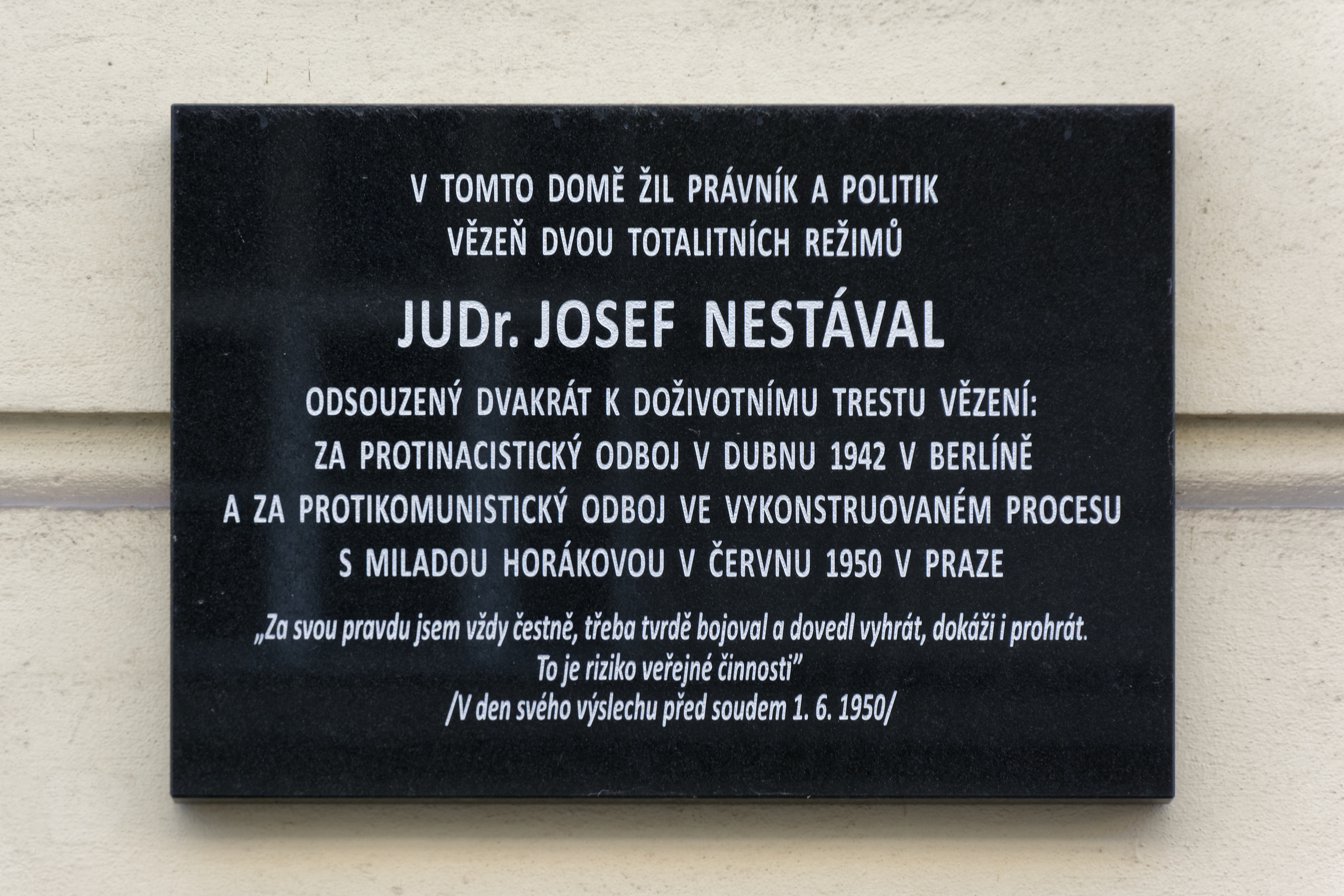
Memorial plaque in Prague dedicated to Josef Nestával, Chief of the Freedom Guard Union

Freedom Guard Union (Czech: Svaz stráže svobody; Slovak: Zväz stráže slobody) was a Czechoslovak organisation that existed from 1932 to 1939, which acted as paramilitary wing of the Czechoslovak National Socialist Party (ČSNS). Organisation was named after Freedom Guard Regiments (PSS), volunteer units originally recruited from the Sokol movement, which mobilised for independence from Austria-Hungary and participated during formation of Czechoslovakia in 1918.

== Foundation ==
Initiative for the creation of the organisation came from party leadership in 1932, especially from party leader Václav Klofáč, former Minister of National Defence. Among main purposes of the organisation was self-defence during party events and meetings, military education of the youth as preparation for military service and organising of various cultural events. The emergence of the organisation was accompanied by the atmosphere of increasing imminent danger from Nazi Germany, where Nazi Party took power in 1933. Organisation was named after Freedom Guards that participated during the establishment of Czechoslovakia and created foundation for the units of the Czechoslovak Army, that subsequently also participated in the Hungarian–Czechoslovak War from 1918 to 1919.

Organisation was officially approved by the Czechoslovak Ministry of the Interior on 11 August 1933. First constituent congress of the organisation took place on 13 October 1933 at Žofín Palace in Prague. Congress elected Jaroslav Motyčka as President and Josef Nestával as Main Chief of the organisation.

== Activities ==
Freedom Guard Union formed local organisational network throughout the country, while most of the local organisations were situated to the border areas with strong German minority presence. Soon after the formation, 126 local divisions were created in Bohemia, 14 in Moravia, 15 in Silesia, 19 in Slovakia and 3 in the Subcarpathian Rus'. Units of the organisation used iconic grey uniforms. Organisation had also membership branches for women, which were uncommon for organisations connected with military environment at that time. Organisation cooperated with other organisations of the party, such as youth wing, trade unions or scouting organisation Freedom Scouts, loosely associated with nation-wide Junák. In 1937 units of the Freedom Guard Union participated among others at the state funeral of Tomáš Masaryk, when they took part of the guard of honour and paid tribute to the remains of the President and founding father of Czechoslovakia. On 21 September 1937 units saluted the funeral procession in front of the Melantrich Publishing House of the Czechoslovak National Socialist Party at the Wenceslas Square in Prague.

== Dissolution ==
In September 1938 members of the organisation from border areas of Czechoslovakia participated along with the military in the Sudeten German uprising in defence of the country from Sudeten German rebels. After Munich Agreement and occupation of the German areas by Nazi Germany and establishment of the Second Republic, Czechoslovak National Socialist Party ceased to operate and most of the party merged into the Party of National Unity. Freedom Guard Union then existed as independent association. After German occupation of the remaining territory of Czechoslovakia in March 1939, organisation was banned.

== Legacy ==
During the German occupation of Czechoslovakia after March 1939, many former members of the organisation participated in the resistance against German occupation. Former Chief of the organisation Josef Nestával was arrested for participation in underground resistance and cooperation with illegal organisation Obrana národa in July 1940 by Gestapo and remained imprisoned until 1945. After Communists took power in 1948 Czechoslovak coup d'état, Josef Nestával participated in the anti-communist resistance. He was arrested in 1949 and was sentenced in a show trial along with Milada Horáková for life-imprisonment in 1950. He was conditionally released in 1963 and died in 1976 in Prague.
