= Death and state funeral of Tomáš Masaryk =

1937 events in Czechoslovakia

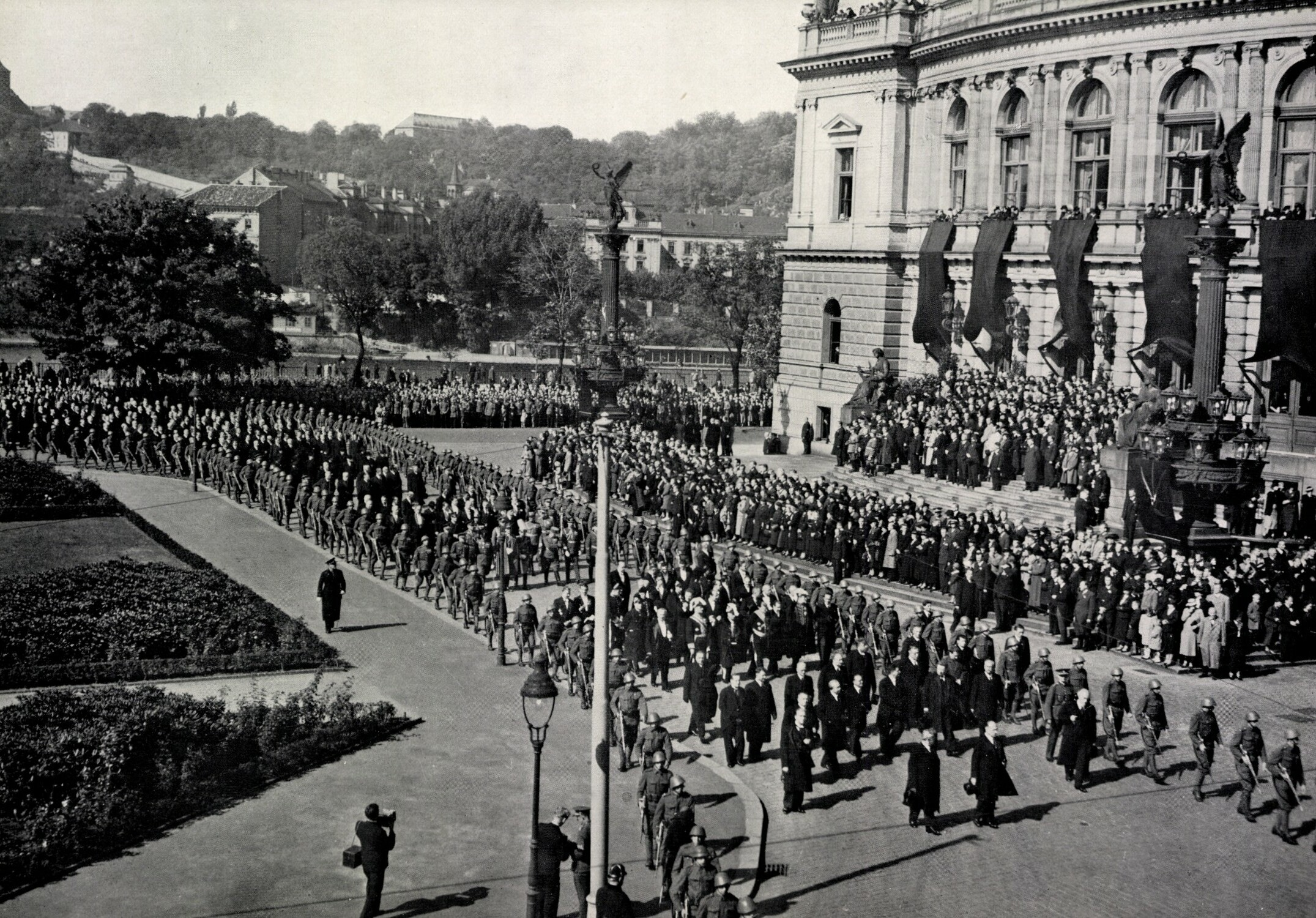
- Funeral procession before the coffin with the body in front of the National Assembly
- Date: 14–21 September 1937 (mourning period); 21 September 1937 (state funeral)
- Venue: Lány Castle; Prague Castle; Old Town Square; Wilson Station; Lány
- Location: Prague, Czechoslovakia Lány, Czechoslovakia
- Participants: Edvard Beneš; Milan Hodža; Gheorghe Tătărescu; Milan Stojadinović; Léon Blum
- Burial: Masaryk Family Grave, Lány Cemetery

Tomáš Masaryk, first President of Czechoslovakia, died at his residence at Lány Castle on 14 September 1937. His state funeral was held in the capital city of Prague on 21 September, and was attended by hundreds of thousands of participants as well as dignitaries from several nations. His body was then transported by funeral train to Lány where he was buried at Masaryk Family Grave at a local cemetery. The funeral of President Masaryk remains one of the biggest funerals in the history of the Czech lands.

== Illness and death ==
President Masaryk abdicated on 14 December 1935 from the post of head of state due to health problems. He died on 14 September 1937 in Lány Castle due to pneumonia. The Chamber of Deputies and Senate of the National Assembly called for the mourning sessions of the chambers and declared state mourning up to 21 September. All flags of Czechoslovakia were flown on half-mast, including for example ones on the Czechoslovak exposition on the Exposition Internationale des Arts et Techniques dans la Vie Moderne in Paris.

== Lying in state ==
On 17 September the remains of President Masaryk were transported from Lány to the Hall of Columns at Prague Castle. The guard of honor by the President's coffin on the catafalque were composed by the members of Prague Castle Guard, veterans of the Czechoslovak Legion in French, Russian and Italian uniforms and members of Sokol. Other night ceremony included guard of honor formed by Masaryk family and other dignitaries including General Louis-Eugène Faucher. From the morning of 18 September to the evening of 20 September about 500,000 to 750,000 people from the public were admitted to pay tribute to the remains.

== State funeral ==
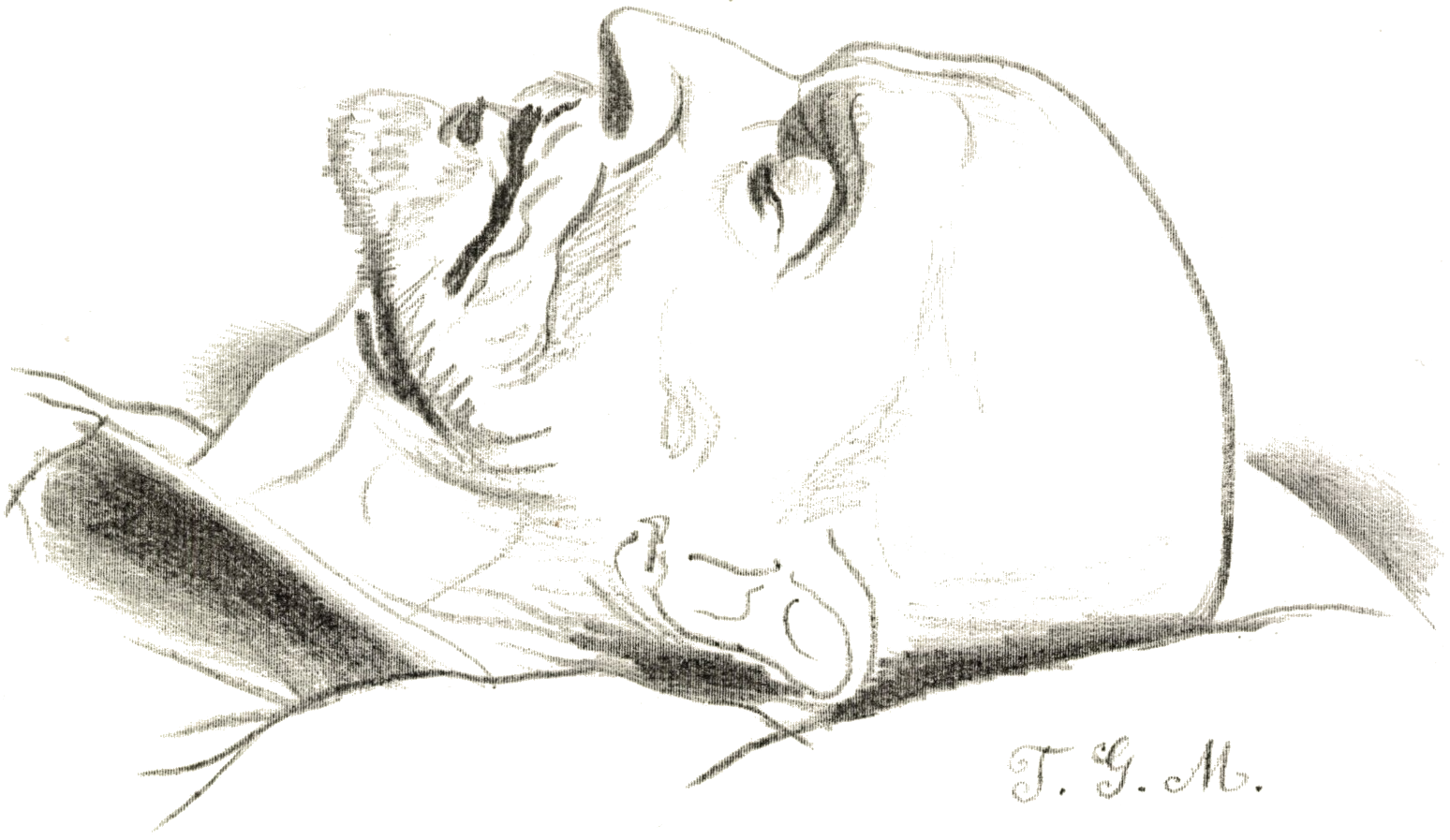
Drawing of President Masaryk's head used for casting his death mask by Vincenc Makovský.

The monumental funeral on 21 September 1937 started at 10 am. Main part of the state funeral was celebrated at the first courtyard of Prague Castle. Among the eulogists were Russian émigré Pavel Milyukov. The main funeral speech was delivered by President Edvard Beneš, where he included famous motto Věrni zůstaneme ("We Will Remain Faithful"). Eulogy was followed by Saint Wenceslas Chorale and 15th-century Hussite chorale Ktož jsú boží bojovníci. Funeral procession was led by the military including Dragoons then left the Castle to the streets of Prague. The procession was lead and commanded by General Jan Syrový. Family of Jan Masaryk were in lead of the family companions followed by President Edvard Beneš and the government. Coffin on the carriage were accompanied by six privates of the 5th Infantry Regiment of the Czechoslovak Army, representing six nationalities of Czechoslovakia: Czechs, Slovaks, Germans, Hungarians, Rusyns, and Poles. Procession route started at second courtyard of Prague Castle headed around the Queen Anne's Summer Palace and then across the Vltava river next to Rudolfinum, seat of the National Assembly. Then it led to the Old Town Square where was built an eternal flame for President Masaryk. Procession stopped there to pay tribute to the Grave of the Unknown Soldier of World War I in Old Town Hall. Procession then passed by the National Theatre through Národní Avenue to Wenceslas Square. Funeral route was accompanied by many organizations of civic society and military, such as units of the Freedom Guard Union, that saluted the funeral procession in front of the Melantrich Publishing House. Funeral procession ended its route at the boulevard next to the Wilson Station. Czechoslovak Army then began a final massive military parade. Funeral train then transported coffin of President Masaryk back to Lány, by route through Stochov. Thousands of people lined the whole track to pay last tribute to the President.

== Foreign dignitaries in attendance ==
- (Kingdom of Romania) Gheorghe Tătărescu – Prime Minister of Romania
- (Kingdom of Yugoslavia) Milan Stojadinović – Prime Minister of Yugoslavia
- Léon Blum – Deputy Prime Minister of France
- (United Kingdom) Commander Philip Henry Hadow of the Royal Navy

== Religious service ==
As a Protestant and member of the Evangelical Church of Czech Brethren, President Masaryk refused service in St. Vitus Cathedral. Final religious service at Lány Cemetery were celebrated by František Urbánek, preacher of the Unity of Czech Brethren and personal friend of President Masaryk. President's burial were accompanied by the choir singing his favourite folk songs Ach synku, synku and Teče voda, teče. At the end of the interment, six boxes of soil from his birthplace in Hodonín, Hustopeče, place of grave of his parents, his residence in Bystrička, place of death of General Milan Rastislav Štefánik in Vajnory and grave of John Amos Comenius in Naarden were solemnly placed into his grave.

== International reactions ==
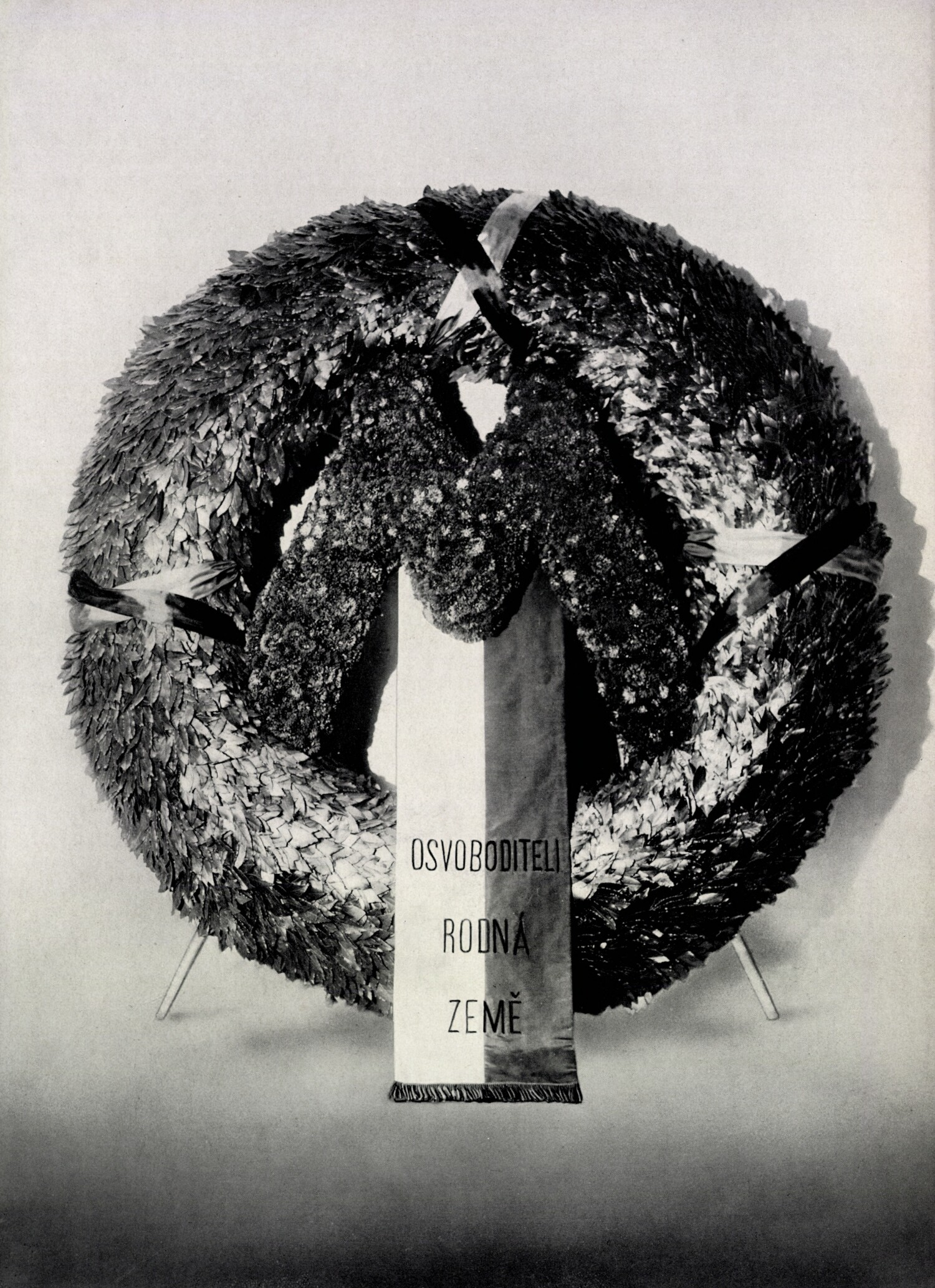
Mourning wreath presented to the President Masaryk by the National Assembly.

- League of Nations
  - President of the Assembly of League of Nations Aga Khan III expressed condolences in his speech at plenary session of the Assembly and praised role of Tomáš Masaryk in strong support for the League of Nations.
- (Federal State of Austria) Austria
  - President Wilhelm Miklas expressed his tribute to President Masaryk and emphasized his good personal contacts with him.
- France
  - President Albert Lebrun expressed his condolences to the Czechoslovak people and embraced strong friendship between France and Czechoslovakia promoted by President Masaryk.
- Latvia
  - President Kārlis Ulmanis expressed his condolences to the Czechoslovak people.
- (Kingdom of Romania) Romania
  - Prime Minister Gheorghe Tătărescu praised legacy of President Masaryk in the founding of Little Entente.
- (Second Spanish Republic) Spain
  - President Manuel Azaña sent a condolences in a letter for President Edvard Beneš.
- Soviet Union
  - Chairman of the Central Executive Committee of the Congress of Soviets Mikhail Kalinin sent a condolences in a letter for President Edvard Beneš.
- United States
  - President Franklin D. Roosevelt sent a condolences in the name of the American people for President Edvard Beneš and praised strong longstanding effort of Masaryk for peace and sympathy of Americans he earned during World War I in the United States.
- (Kingdom of Yugoslavia) Yugoslavia
  - Prime Minister Milan Stojadinović praised legacy of President Masaryk and Alexander I of Yugoslavia as founding fathers of two closest countries of Czechoslovakia and Yugoslavia and their common founding ideals.

== Gallery ==
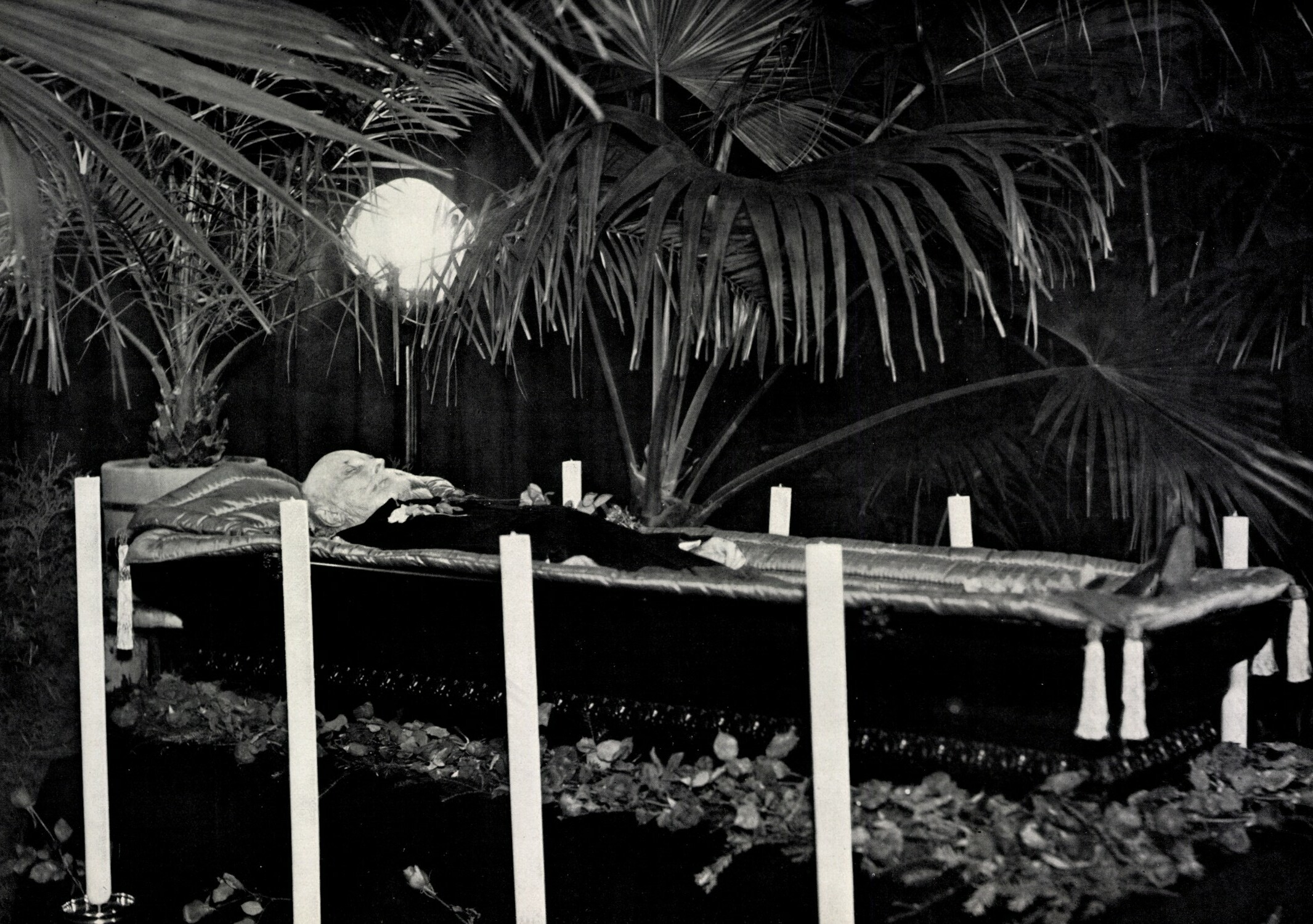
The remains of President Masaryk in Lány Castle before the funeral.

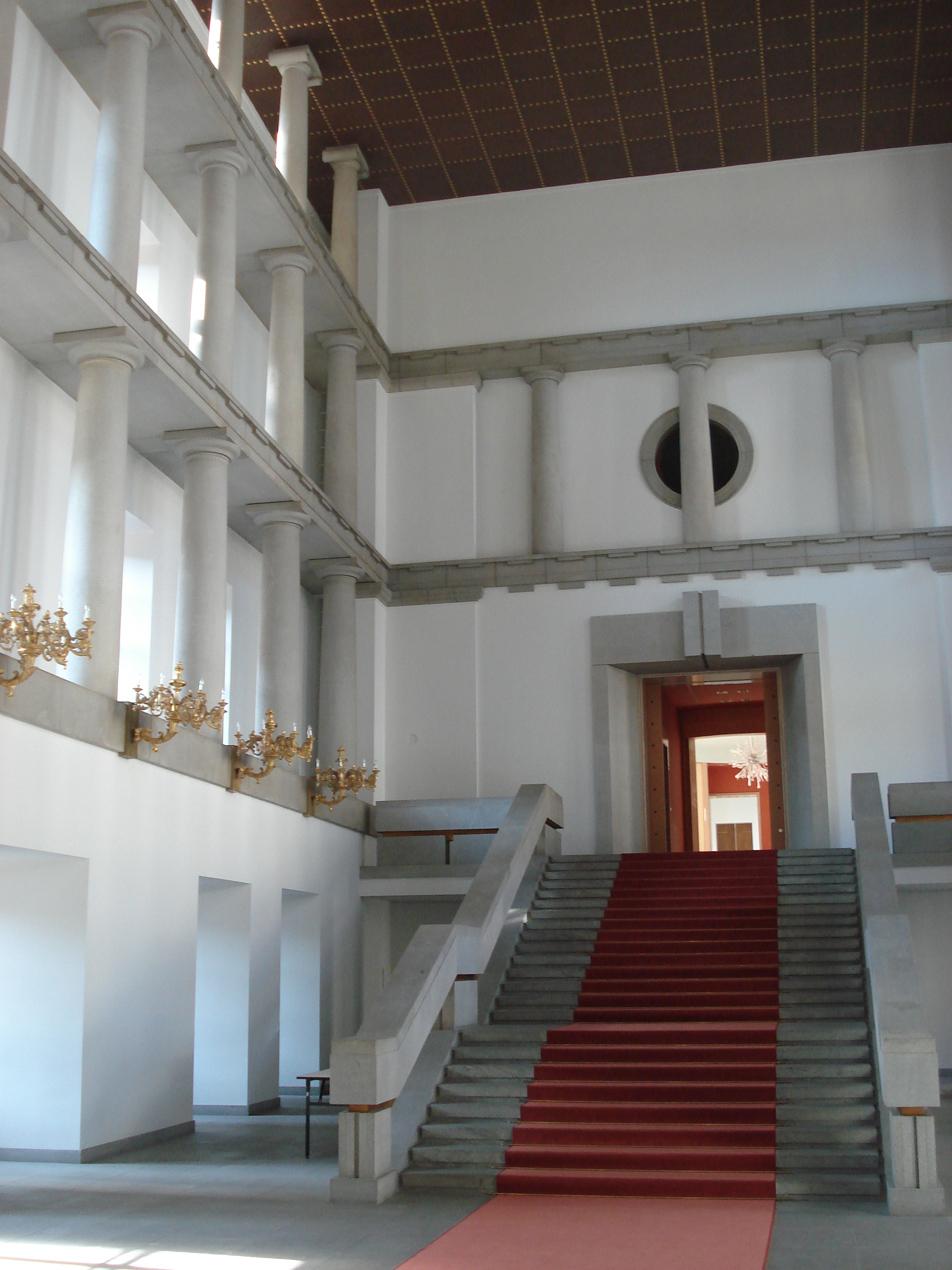
Masaryk's body was put on display at the Hall of Columns of the Prague Castle.

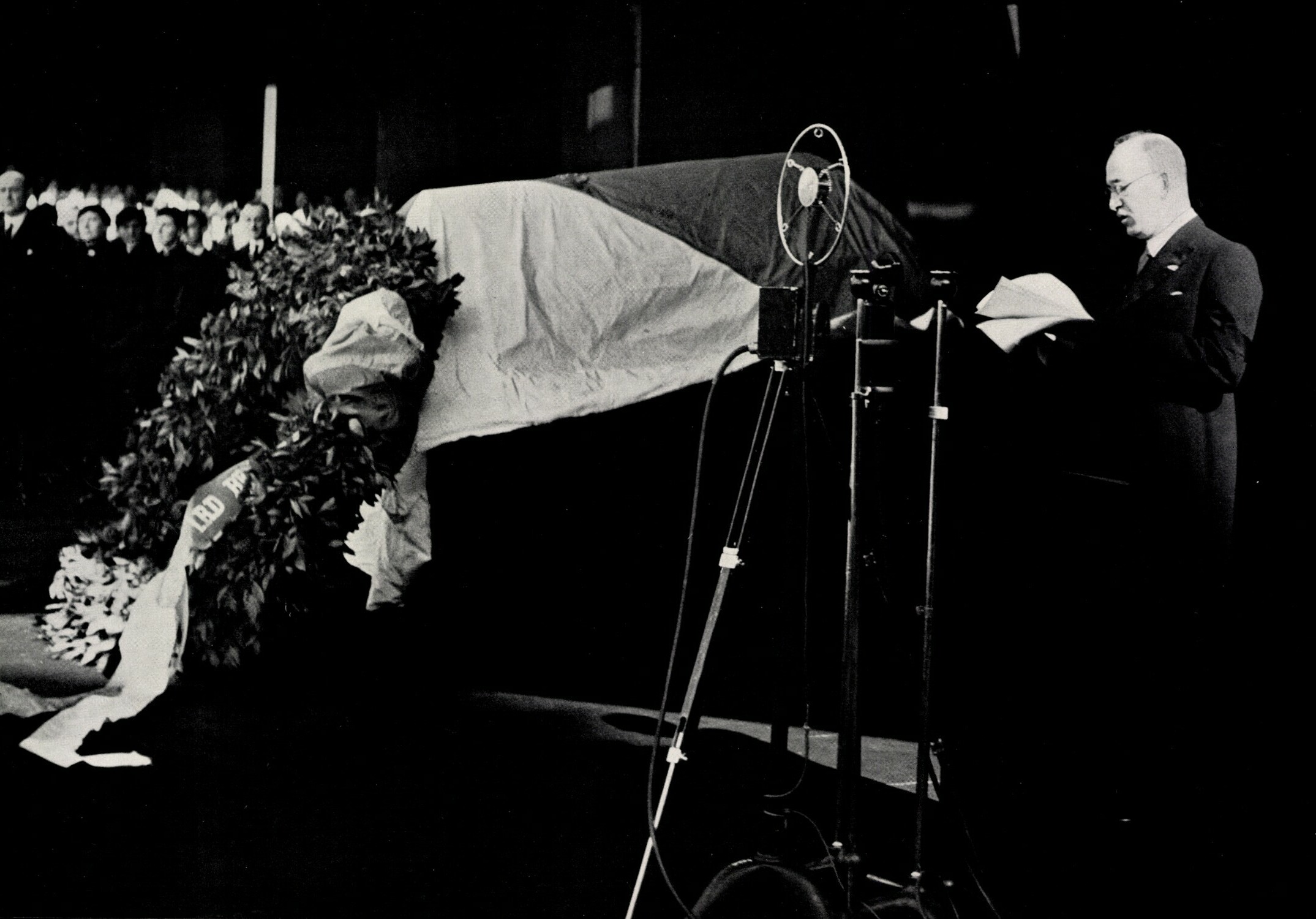
President Edvard Beneš delivers a famous eulogy speech with motto Věrni zůstaneme on 21 September 1937.

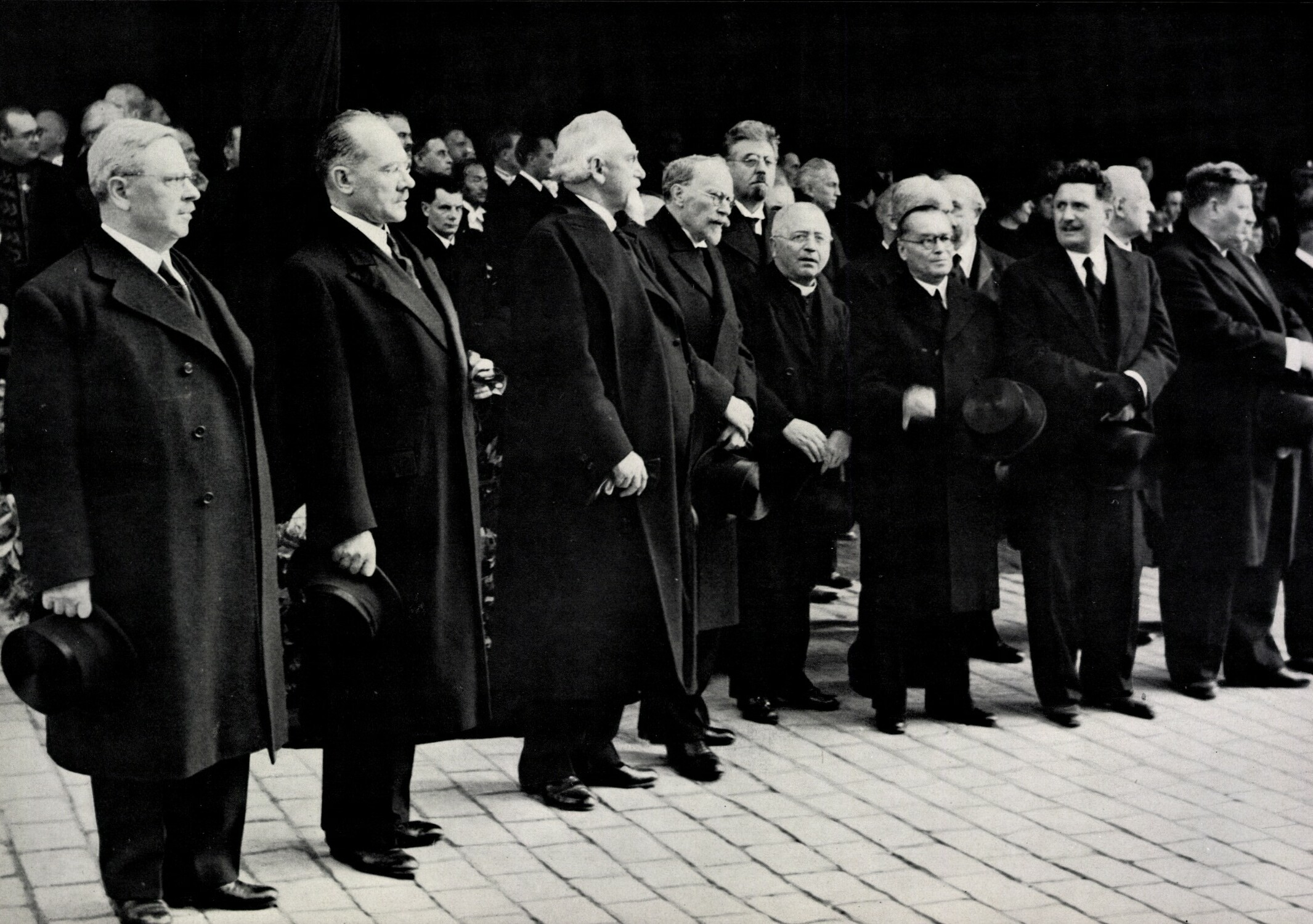
Government officials at the funeral procession on 21 September 1937.

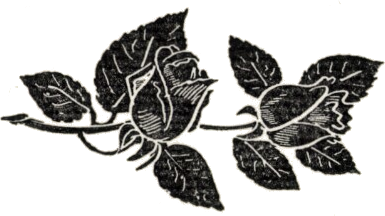
The remains of President Masaryk were transported by funeral train decorated with linden leaves from the Wilson Station to Lány.

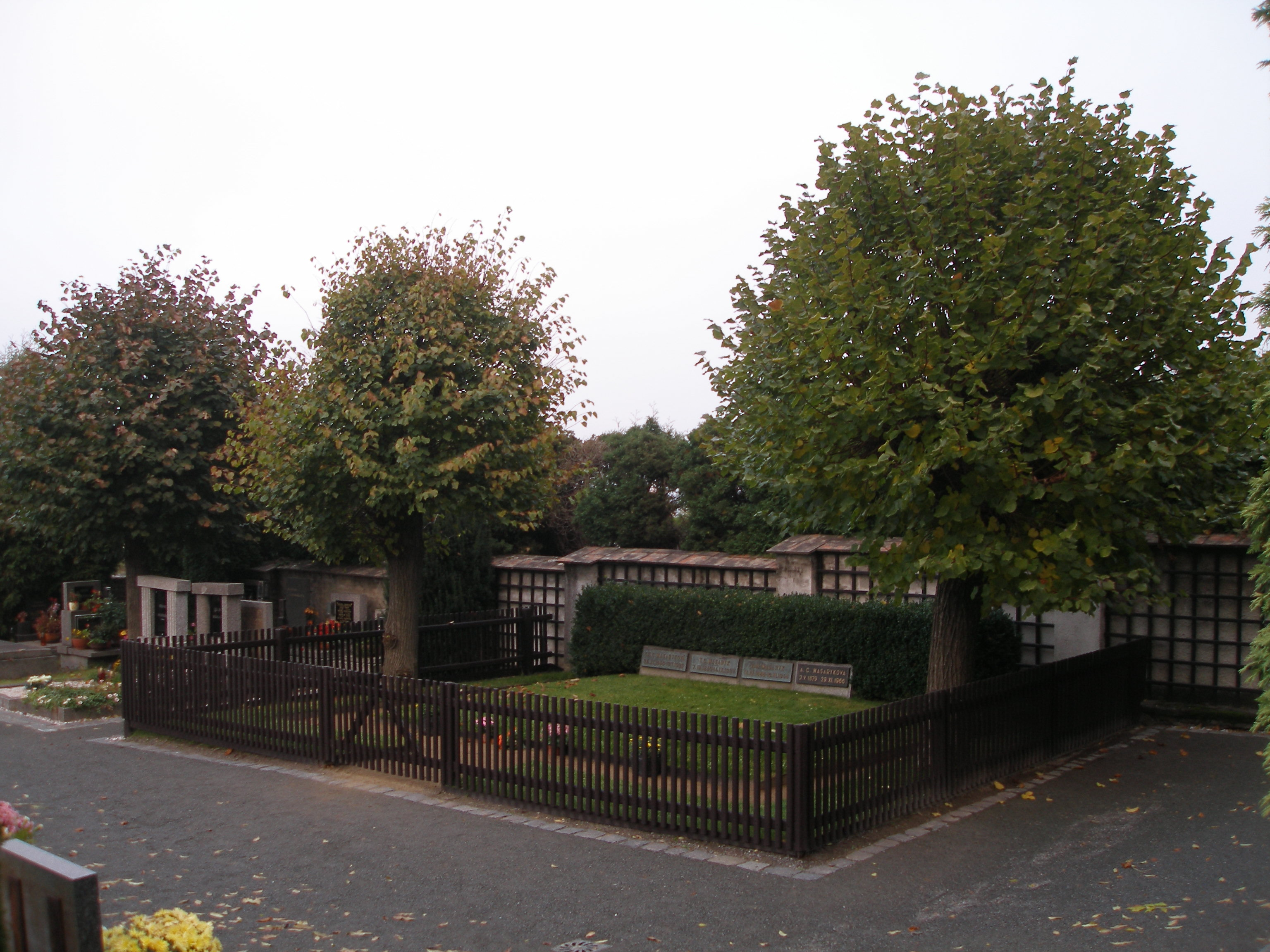
Masaryk Family Grave in Lány.
