= Václav Fresl =

Czech politician

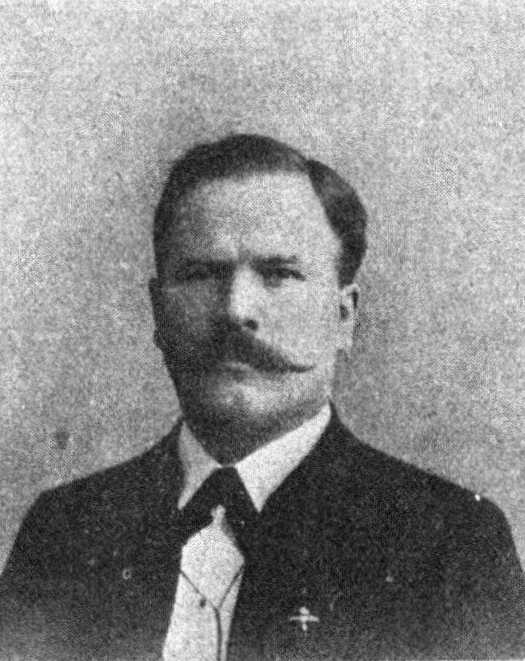

Personal details
- Born: October 14, 1868
- Died: September 23, 1915
- Party: Czech National Social Party

Václav Fresl (14 October 1868, in Pelhřimov, Kingdom of Bohemia – 23 December 1915) was a Czech politician of the late-nineteenth and early twentieth centuries. He was a member of the Czech National Socialist Party from Pilsen/Plzeň and was a member of the Imperial Council in Vienna. Fresl was a close collaborator of Václav Klofáč and was infamous in Austrian parliamentary circles as a leader in the disruptions that often paralyzed the Austrian parliament. Fresl once kept the parliament from transacting its business by speaking for more than 13 hours straight. When finished, he had to be carried from the hall by supporters.
