= České slovo =

- "Pravda zvítězí" (Truth will win)

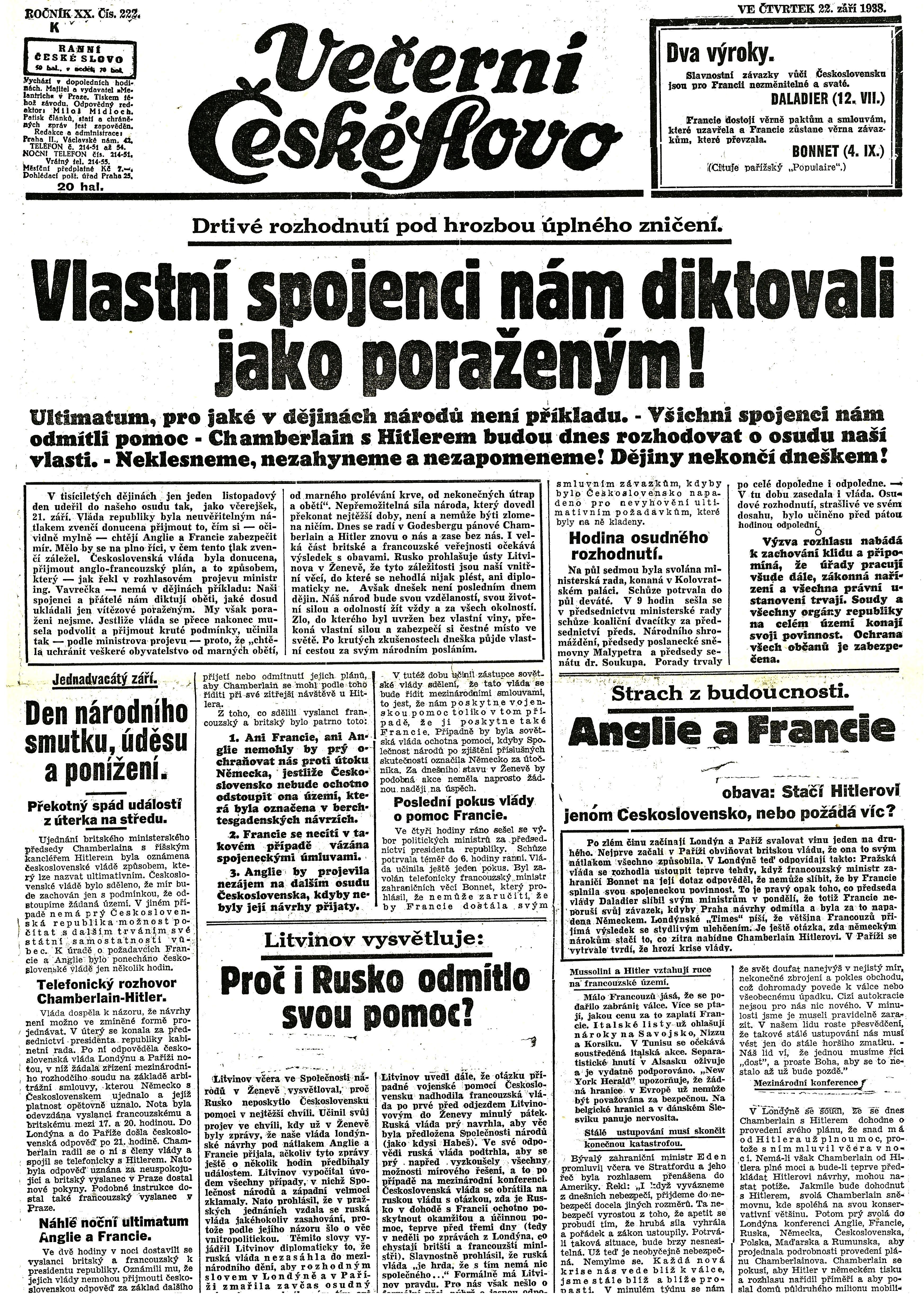
- Cover of České slovo (22 September 1938), with the headline reporting Munich Agreement
- Type: Daily newspaper
- Format: Berliner
- Owner(s): Melantrich, Graphics and Art Institute of the National Social Party
- Founders: Václav Klofáč; Jaroslav Šalda
- Publisher: Publishing House Melantrich
- Founded: 1907; 118 years ago
- Ceased publication: 1990 (as exile České slovo); 1997 (as Slovo)
- Language: Czech
- Headquarters: Wenceslas Square 36, Prague, Czechoslovakia
- Country: Austria-Hungary; Czechoslovakia; Czech Republic

České slovo (English: Czech/Bohemian Word), also known as Svobodné slovo (English: Free Word) was a Czech daily newspaper, founded and continuously published in Prague since 1907, by Publishing House Melantrich, until its cancellation in 1997. The newspaper was founded by Union of National Social Workers of National Social Party led by Václav Klofáč and Jaroslav Šalda. The newspaper was banned several times between 1915 and 1918, 1939 and 1945 and nationalised from 1948 to 1990. During the communist regime in Czechoslovakia, Josef Pejskar and Council of Free Czechoslovakia published a version for the Czechoslovak exile (1955–1990).

In 1990, the newspaper was renamed "Slovo" ("Word") and later was closed down due to bad privatisation of Melantrich in 1997.

One of its journalists was František R. Kraus.

== See also ==
- Melantrich
- Czech National Social Party
