= Wrestling Titans =

Pair of sculptures in Prague, Czech Republic

- Czech: Sousoší Souboj Titánů
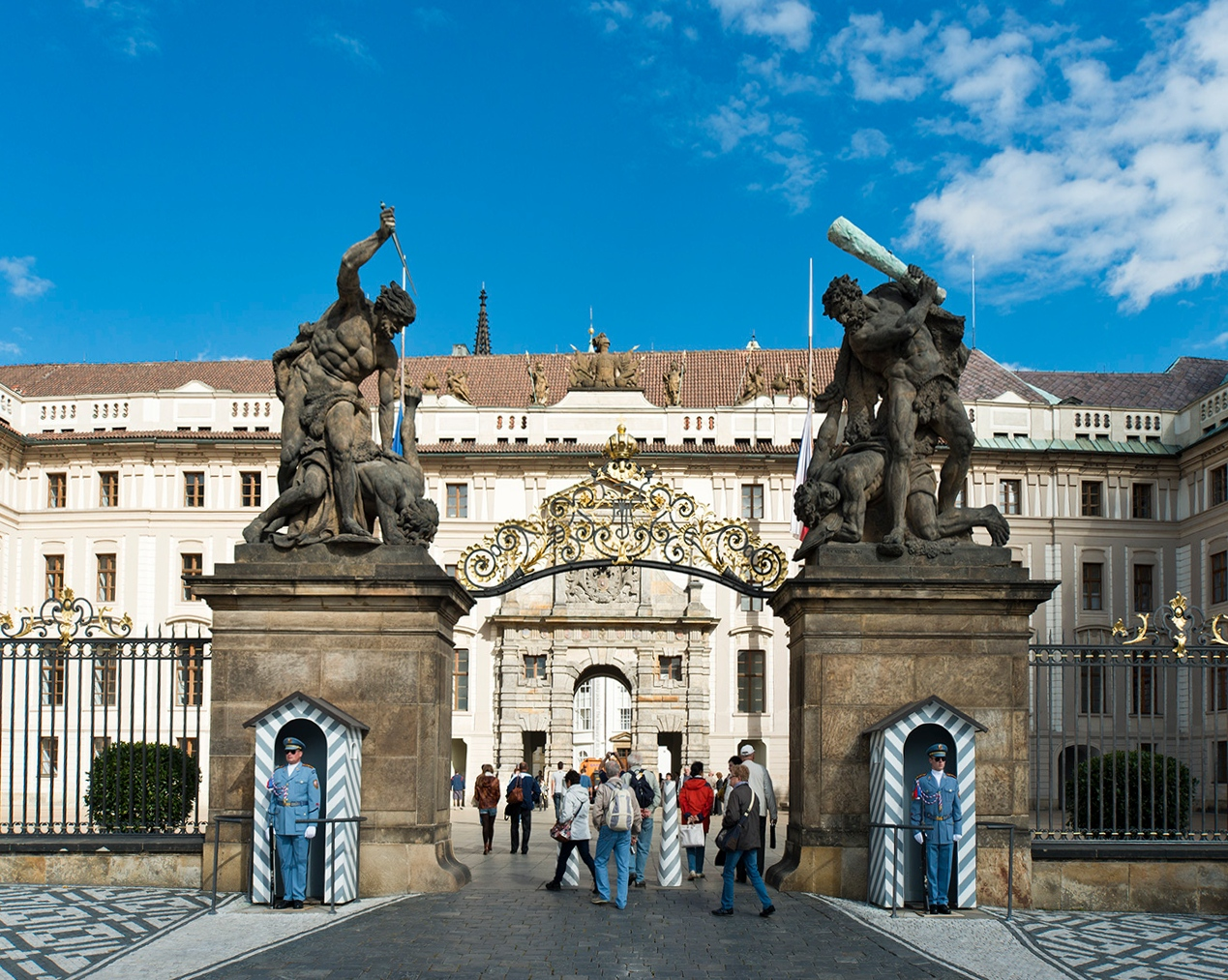
- The sculptures in 2012
- 50°5′23″N 14°23′54″E

Wrestling Titans (Czech: Sousoší Souboj Titánů), also known as Fighting Giants and Giants' Gate, is a pair of outdoor sculptures leading to the first courtyard of Prague Castle, in the Czech Republic.
