= Marek Obrtel =

Czech politician and former military officer

- Born: 17 December 1966 (age 59); Přerov, Czechoslovakia (now Czech Republic)
- Military career
- Allegiance: Czech Republic
- Branch: Czech Land Forces
- Service years: 1999–2006
- Rank: Podplukovník – lieutenant colonel
- Conflicts: Bosnian War; Kosovo War; War in Afghanistan

Marek Obrtel (born 17 December 1966) is a Czech politician and former military officer. He is known for publicly returning his Army of the Czech Republic military medals in 2014 over his opposition to NATO and the United States.

In 2015, Obrtel formed the Czechoslovak Soldiers in Reserves, a pro-Russian right-wing paramilitary, but left it later that year following an internal falling-out with its members. He subsequently joined the National Home Guard, another paramilitary associated with National Democracy. Obrtel began his political career in 2018, running on right-wing platforms in several elections, but has not been elected. Since 2025, he is a member of the left-wing Czech National Social Party.

== Early life and career ==
Obrtel was born on 17 December 1966 in Přerov, Czechoslovakia. He attended and graduated from Charles University and the University of Defence's Military Medical Academy.

Obrtel joined the Czech Land Forces in 1999 as a military doctor. He served in the Bosnian War, Kosovo War, and War in Afghanistan. Over the course of his career he held several commanding positions in the Czech military, including deputy commander of the Military Medical Service headquarters, colonel in the Army's general staff at the Military Health Section, and chief of the 11th Field Hospital. He became disillusioned with NATO while serving as a medical advisor to the Kosovo Force Multinational Brigade Center in Pristina during the Kosovo War.

Obrtel retired from the Czech military in 2006, after which he became director of the Pardubice Region Medical Rescue Service and worked as a doctor in Moravia.

== Return of medals ==
On 22 December 2014, Obrtel published an open letter to Minister of Defence Martin Stropnický asking to return the medals he earned for his service in NATO operations. In the letter, Obrtel cited Russia–United States relations, geopolitical developments, and his opposition to NATO and the U.S. as his reasoning, calling NATO a "criminal organization" with "atrocious interests" and alleging the U.S. was abusing Europe and was planning to declare war on Russia. He declared his support for Russia and Russian president Vladimir Putin for "the foresight, restraint and balance with which he reflects the provocations of the West", as well as Czech president Miloš Zeman for his anti-American stances, while also condemning the government of Ukraine as "another product of desperate American imperialism".

The Ministry of Defence responded to Obrtel's request by informing him that, while there was no law that allowed them to take away medals, he was free to return them himself if he wished to. Obrtel accepted, and returned his four medals.

== Paramilitary activities ==
On 1 January 2015, Obrtel formed the Czechoslovak Soldiers in Reserves (Českoslovenští vojáci v záloze; CSR), a pro-Russian right-wing paramilitary largely consisting of former Czech soldiers. The CSR "rejects the aggressive and pro-war policy of the Czech and Slovak political elites, as imposed by the USA and the EU"; refuses participation in "acts of aggression of the global elite through NATO", including any conflict against Russia or its allies; alleges the Czech Republic is a "pseudo-democracy" and has been "unlawfully divided, looted, indebted, people enslaved and their families liquidated by repossession genocide, national infrastructure transferred into the hands of Western corporations"; and views the Russian Armed Forces as "friends" while also viewing Czech politicians as "enemies".

In January 2015, after forming the CSR, Obrtel made a statement to Serbian news agency Novosti a.d., commenting on NATO's involvement in the Kosovo War in 1999 and alleging the West supported war crimes in the Kosovo War:

Genocide against Serbs took place in Kosovo, and it was instigated by the West. For this reason, I am filled with sadness, bitterness and disappointment as I was part of the NATO machinery. I also witnessed how drug lords became respectable officials of the so-called state of Kosovo, and how mass murderers became heroes.

The CSR drew public attention for their appearance in the 2015 commemoration of the Velvet Revolution on 17 November, when members arrived in uniforms to show their support for Zeman during his speech. They also offered their services to him, though he declined their offer. Later, Czech Television filmed a CSR training exercise in the Bohemian Forest and witnessed its members, including Obrtel, simulating the "capture of a refugee", including several members attacking a fellow trainee (acting as the refugee in question) while shouting xenophobic remarks such as "These bastards don’t belong here, they crossed our border. This is violence!" The Security Information Service expressed their concerns surrounding groups like the CSR, warning that extremist groups attracted Russian and Chinese intelligence agents and could increase crime and violence should a member "grow tired of trainings in nature and chatter through Facebook, and decide to take things into his own hands".

According to Obrtel, the CSR had around 6,000 members in 2015, with an active core base of 500 members. However, following an internal falling-out near the end of 2015, the size of the CSR shrunk as several members, including Obrtel, left the group for the National Home Guard (Národní domobrana; ND), shrinking the CSR's core base to approximately 200 members.

On 17 November 2016, Obrtel co-led an ultranationalist march at the Israeli Embassy and in the Josefov quarter of Prague. The marchers were confronted by anti-fascist demonstrators several times, and both were met by Czech Police riot officers, but the march ultimately ended peacefully.

== Political career ==
In the 2018 Czech Senate election, Obrtel ran for Senate for the Czech National Social Party in Prostějov.

In the 2021 Czech parliamentary election, Obrtel ran for electoral leader in the Olomouc Region for the Free Bloc. He ran on a strongly conservative platform based on increasing military strength and national security, fighting against "COVID tyranny" and pharmaceutical industry influence, considering holistic medicine as "a basis for recovery", promoting traditional families over "the influence of gender, LGBTIQ activities, inclusion, juvenile justice or the violent Islamization of children's lives", and shifting the Czech Republic away from liberal democracy.

In the 2025 Czech parliamentary election, he unsuccessfully ran for Stačilo! as a member of the Czech National Social Party.

In April 2026, he was elected a deputy leader of the Czech National Social Party.

== Personal life ==
Obrtel lives in Rokytnice, Olomouc Region.
