= Alois Neuman =

Czechoslovak politician

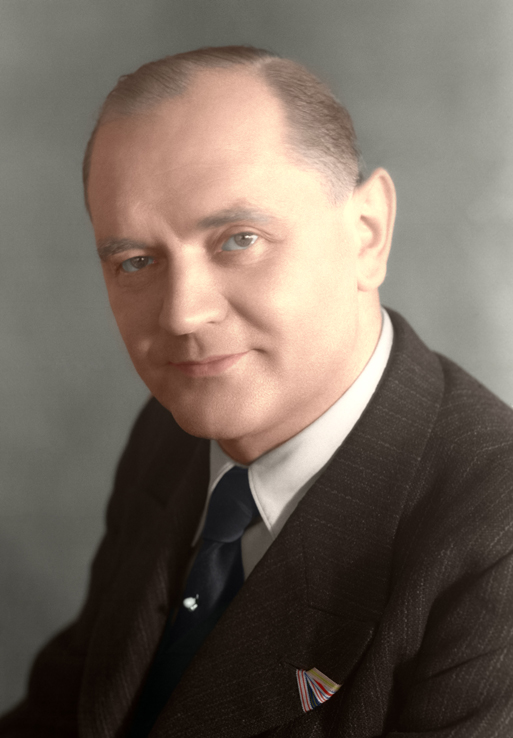
- Born: 12 March 1901; Smidary, Austria-Hungary
- Died: 27 July 1977 (aged 76); Prague, Czechoslovakia

Alois Neuman (12 March 1901 – 27 July 1977) was a Czechoslovak politician and resistance fighter against Nazism. He was arrested and held in the Buchenwald concentration camp due to resisting the Nazi efforts.

== Education and early career ==
Neuman studied law at Charles University in Prague from 1920 to 1924 and received his doctorate in law in 1925. He then worked for a health insurance company in České Budějovice.

== Political career ==
He became a member of the Czechoslovak (People's) Socialist Party (ČSS or ČSNS) and later served as the Vice President of its Central Committee. From 1935 to 1939, he was a member of the Czechoslovak National Assembly and from 1937 to 1939, he served as mayor of České Budějovice. In late 1938, after the Munich Agreement and the dissolution of the ČSNS, he joined the recently formed right-wing Party of National Unity.

In 1945, Neuman became a member of the constituent national assembly and was re-appointed mayor of České Budějovice, serving from 1946 to 1948. He rejoined the Socialist Party, which became the bloc party after the February 1948 coup d'état by the Communist Party of Czechoslovakia (KSČ).

Neuman advocated for cooperation with the communists within his party. From 1948 to 1960, he was deputy chairman of the party, which had reverted to its former name, ČSS, and was a member of the National Front Action Committee. Under Klement Gottwald's government, he became Minister of Post and Communications in 1948, a position he held until 1960. In 1957, he published a memorial report on the resistance of the Czechoslovak prisoners in Buchenwald.

From July 1960 to April 1968, Neuman served as Minister of Justice in the government of the Czechoslovak Socialist Republic (CSR) and simultaneously as the chairman of the ČSS. The party later named him honorary chairman. Neuman was a member of the National Assembly until 1969, and then served in the People's Chamber in the Federal Assembly of the CSR until 1976.

== Buchenwald concentration camp ==
Neuman was arrested by the Gestapo in September 1939 during Operation Alberich and was taken to Buchenwald concentration camp where he joined the camp's international concentration camp committee in resistance to the Nazi regime. Following the defeat of the Nazis, he was one of the four signatories of a greeting from the Czechoslovak National Committee addressed to the International Camp Committee.

== Bibliography ==
- Soviet man and his country. 1951.
- German people on new roads. Orbis, Prague 1953.
- German [D] [R] ep [republic], new state, new people, new life. Orbis, Prague 1956.
- How I lived. Melantrich, Prague 1971.

== Literature ==
- Emil Carlebach, Willy Schmidt, Ulrich Schneider (eds.): Buchenwald, a concentration camp. Reports - pictures - documents. Bonn 2000, ISBN 3-89144-271-8, p. 120.
- Alois Neumann, in: Internationales Biographisches Archiv 42/1977 of 10 October 1977 in the Munzinger archive (beginning of article freely available).
