= Melantrich =

Former Czech publisher

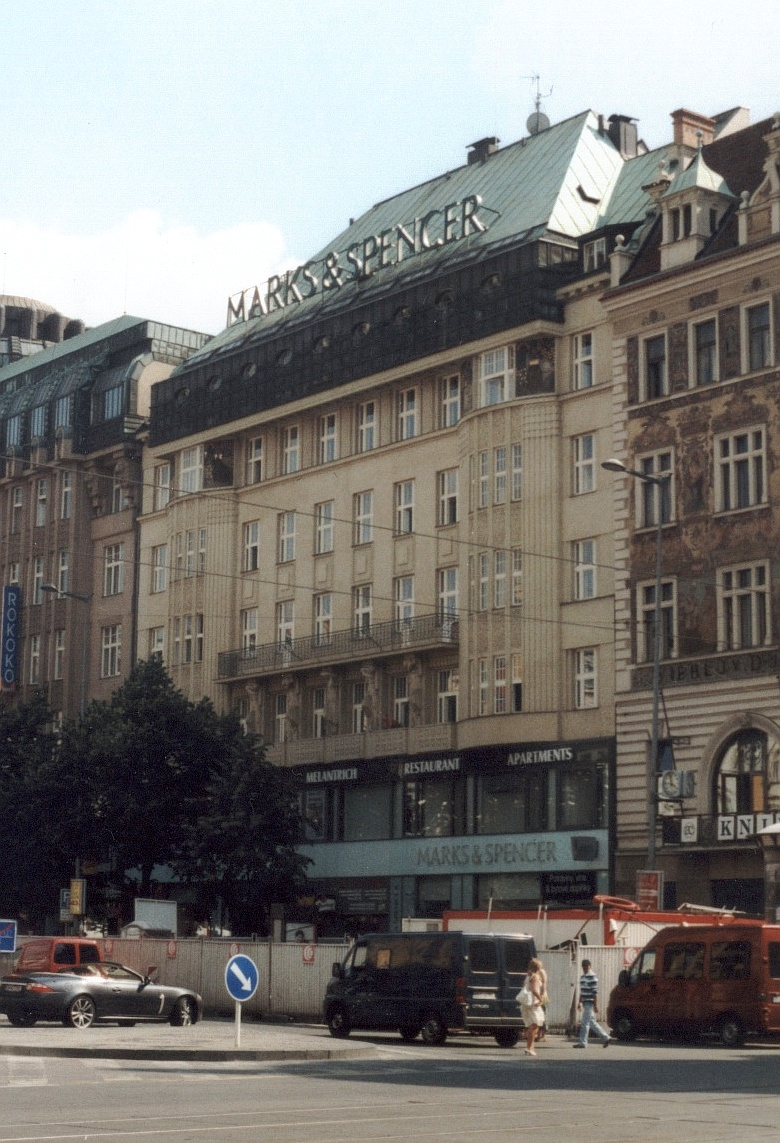
Historical building of Melantrich publishing house on Wenceslas Square in Prague in summer 2007

Melantrich (Czech: Nakladatelství Melantrich, lit. 'Melantrich Publishing House') was a large Czech-language publishing house connected with the Czech National Social Party. Established in 1897, the publisher remained in existence until 1999.

== History ==
Melantrich printing works, between 1910 and 1921, photo by Rudolf Bruner-Dvořák

In 1897 the Czech National Social Party (ČSNS; no relation to German National Socialism) was founded after a split within the Czechoslavonic Social Democratic Workers' Party. The new party set up a publishing house called Knihtiskárna národně sociálního dělnictva ('Printing press of the national socialist workers') on July 9, 1897. The party also started a daily newspaper, Česká demokracie ('The Czech Democracy'), led by Václav Klofáč, without much success.

In 1907 Jaroslav Šalda, a talented worker from the printing press, together with Klofáč started a new daily, České slovo ('The Czech Word'). The newspaper proved to be successful and in 1910 the publishing house bought the building of "Hvězda" ('The Star') on the Wenceslaus Square. The company adopted the name Melantrich after renaissance publisher Jiří Melantrich of Aventino (born Jiří Černý Rožďalovický c. 1511, Rožďalovice – November 19, 1580, Prague). The building was given the same name after a 1922 reconstruction.

In 1919 the company, obtaining an official permit, started to publish several newspapers and journals (including the first tabloid in the Czech lands, Pražský ilustrovaný zpravodaj). In 1924 Melantrich became joint stock company. In 1926 a Koppe & Bellmann printing press from Smíchov was acquired. In 1928 a branch in Ostrava was established, in 1934 a branch in Brno, and later a branch in Žilina. During the 1930s Melantrich got involved in movie production and in commercial graphics. In 1936 music publishing company "MelPa" (Melantrich + Pazdírek) was established. It was one of the largest publishers of books in the country. The spectrum of literature published by Melantrich was very wide and included works by many contemporary Czech writers, such as Božena Benešová, Jan Čep, Jaroslav Durych, Egon Hostovský, Josef Kopta, Vítězslav Nezval, Ivan Olbracht, and Vladislav Vančura. The circulation of some its newspapers and journals reached hundreds of thousands, and in a few cases (Večerní slovo, weekly Svobodný zítřek) more than one million.

Led by Šalda, Melantrich became the largest publisher in the First Republic of Czechoslovakia. After the Nazi occupation (1939) the company managed to stay in business, but Šalda was imprisoned in 1941 and it was taken over by Nazi collaborators. After the war Šalda, unwilling to participate in politics anymore, was removed by the party from his executive position. České slovo was renamed to Svobodné slovo ('The Free Word') in 1945.

After the communist takeover of the country in 1948, Šalda was ousted and the company was nationalized and split into three parts. In 1950 the Czechoslovak Socialist Party (the ČSNS had changed its name) was granted the right to control the company again while the state remained its formal owner (this settlement led to litigation after 1989). In 1950 the publishing house changed its name to Svobodné slovo-Melantrich, in 1960 to Svobodné slovo and again in 1967 back to Melantrich.

During the Velvet Revolution in 1989, the Melantrich building's balcony served as a stage for speakers to the masses of protesters gathered in Wenceslaus Square. The socialist party later used this balcony as the main symbol of their (eventually unsuccessful) election campaign in 1990.

The first half of the 1990s was spent in disputes and litigation over who the new owner of the company would be. The newspaper Svobodné slovo changed its editor-in-chief many times while circulation steadily declined. In 1996 Melantrich was bought by a media company, part of the Chemapol group. Svobodné slovo was renamed to Slovo ('The Word') and in 1998 sold out. Chemapol went bankrupt in 1998. The publishing house was, like many other large traditional publishers in the Czech Republic, unable to compete and closed down in 1999.

Afterwards, the Melantrich building was turned into a luxury hotel.
