= Habry =

- Town
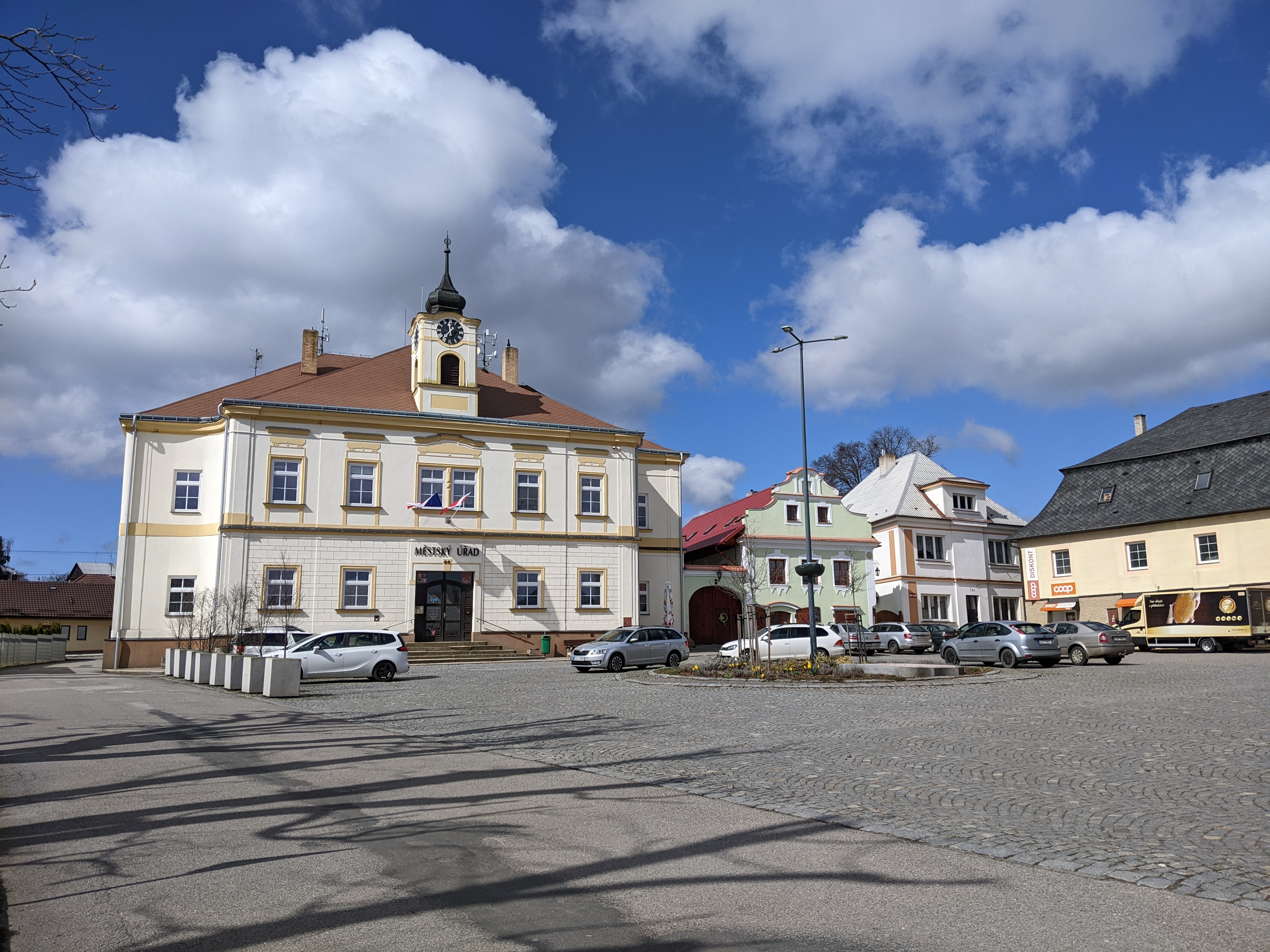
- Town square

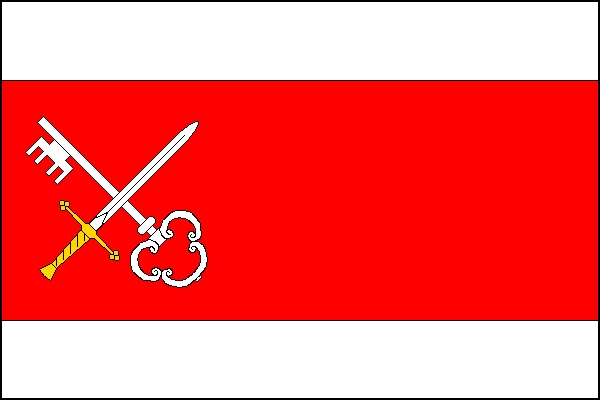
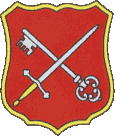
- Flag Coat of arms

- Location in the Czech Republic
- Coordinates: 49°45′22″N 15°29′6″E
- Country: Czech Republic
- Region: Vysočina
- District: Havlíčkův Brod
- First mentioned: 1101

Government
  - Mayor: Pavel Víšek

Area
  - Total: 27.45 km^{2} (10.60 sq mi)
- Elevation: 468 m (1,535 ft)

Population (2026-01-01)
  - Total: 1,319
  - Density: 48.05/km^{2} (124.5/sq mi)
- Time zone: UTC+1 (CET)
  - Summer (DST): UTC+2 (CEST)
- Postal codes: 582 81, 582 82, 582 91
- Website: www.habry.cz

Habry (Czech pronunciation: [ˈɦabrɪ]; German: Habern) is a town in Havlíčkův Brod District in the Vysočina Region of the Czech Republic. It has about 1,300 inhabitants.

== Administrative division ==
Habry consists of four municipal parts (in brackets population according to the 2021 census):

- Habry (983)
- Frýdnava (97)
- Lubno (27)
- Zboží (163)

== Etymology ==
In Czech, the name Habry literally means 'hornbeams'.

== Geography ==
Habry is located about 18 kilometres (11 mi) north of Havlíčkův Brod. It lies in the Upper Sázava Hills. The highest point is at 547 m (1,795 ft) above sea level. The Sázavka Stream flows through the town. The town is situated on the shore of the fishpond Haberský rybník.

== History ==
The first written mention of Habry is in Chronica Boemorum and refers to the year 1101, when Duke Ulrich I passed through Habry. It was a market settlement on an ancient trade route. In 1351, Habry was promoted to a market town. In 1909, it was promoted to a town.

== Demographics ==
Historical population

Year	Pop.	±%
1869	2,859	—
1880	2,862	+0.1%
1890	2,555	−10.7%
1900	2,522	−1.3%
1910	2,432	−3.6%

Year	Pop.	±%
1921	2,238	−8.0%
1930	2,040	−8.8%
1950	1,642	−19.5%
1961	1,793	+9.2%
1970	1,551	−13.5%

Year	Pop.	±%
1980	1,341	−13.5%
1991	1,317	−1.8%
2001	1,298	−1.4%
2011	1,288	−0.8%
2021	1,270	−1.4%

Source: Censuses

== Transport ==
The I/38 road (the section from Havlíčkův Brod to Kutná Hora) runs through the town.

== Sights ==
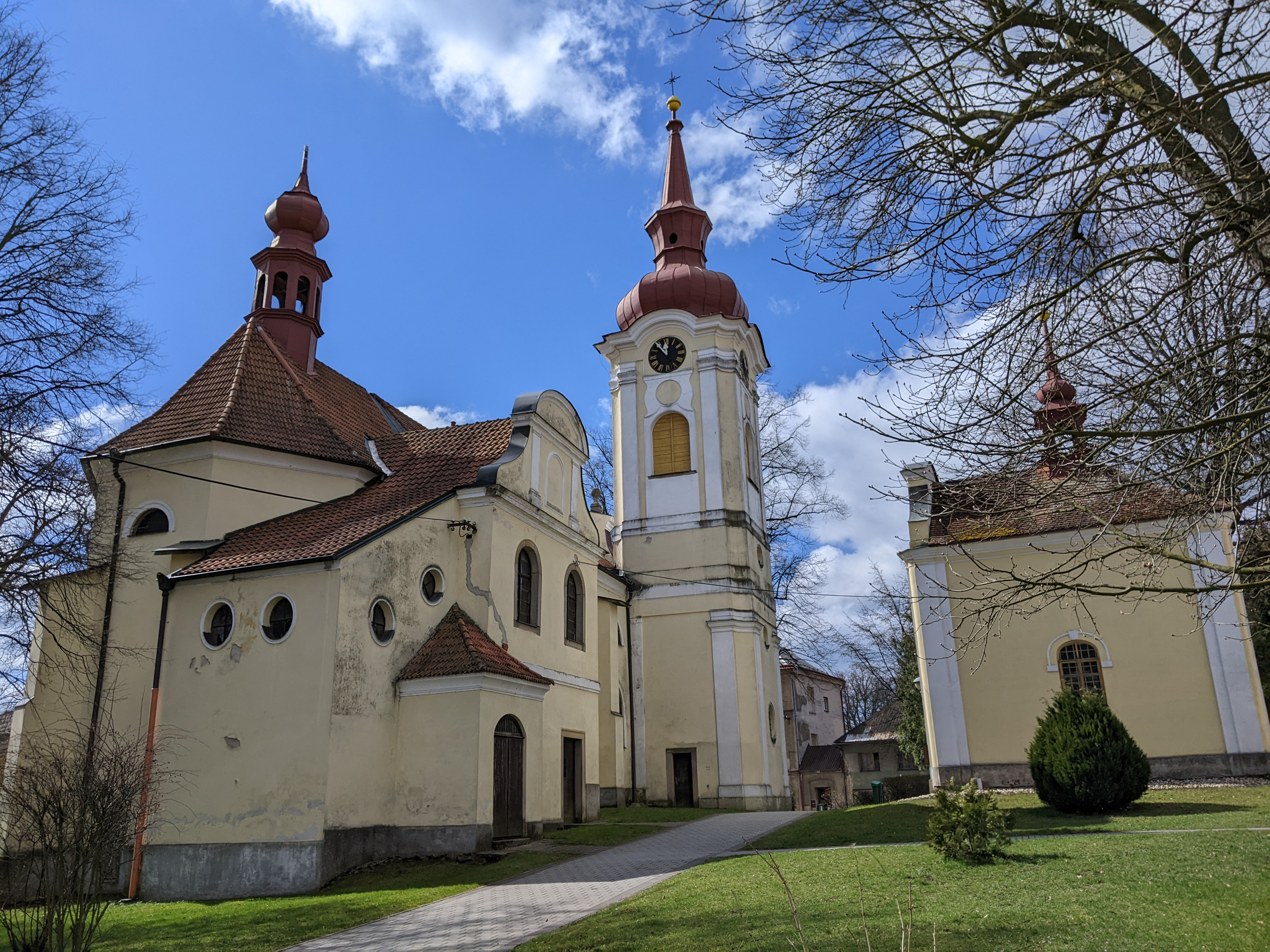
Church of the Assumption of the Virgin Mary

The Church of the Assumption of the Virgin Mary has an early Gothic core. Its present appearance is from 1678 and is in the Mannerist style. The tower was added in the 18th century. Next to the church is a Neoclassical cemetery chapel.

There is a small Baroque castle in the town centre. It was built in 1718. Today it serves as an institute of social welfare.

Among the main landmarks of the town is the town hall. It is a large early Neoclassical building that dates from 1770.

The Jewish cemetery was allegedly founded in the 14th century, but is documented only in the first half of the 17th century. The oldest preserved tombstone dates from 1740.

== Notable people ==
- František Ladislav Chleborád (1839–1911), economist
