= Popular socialism (Nordic countries) =

Type of socialist ideology

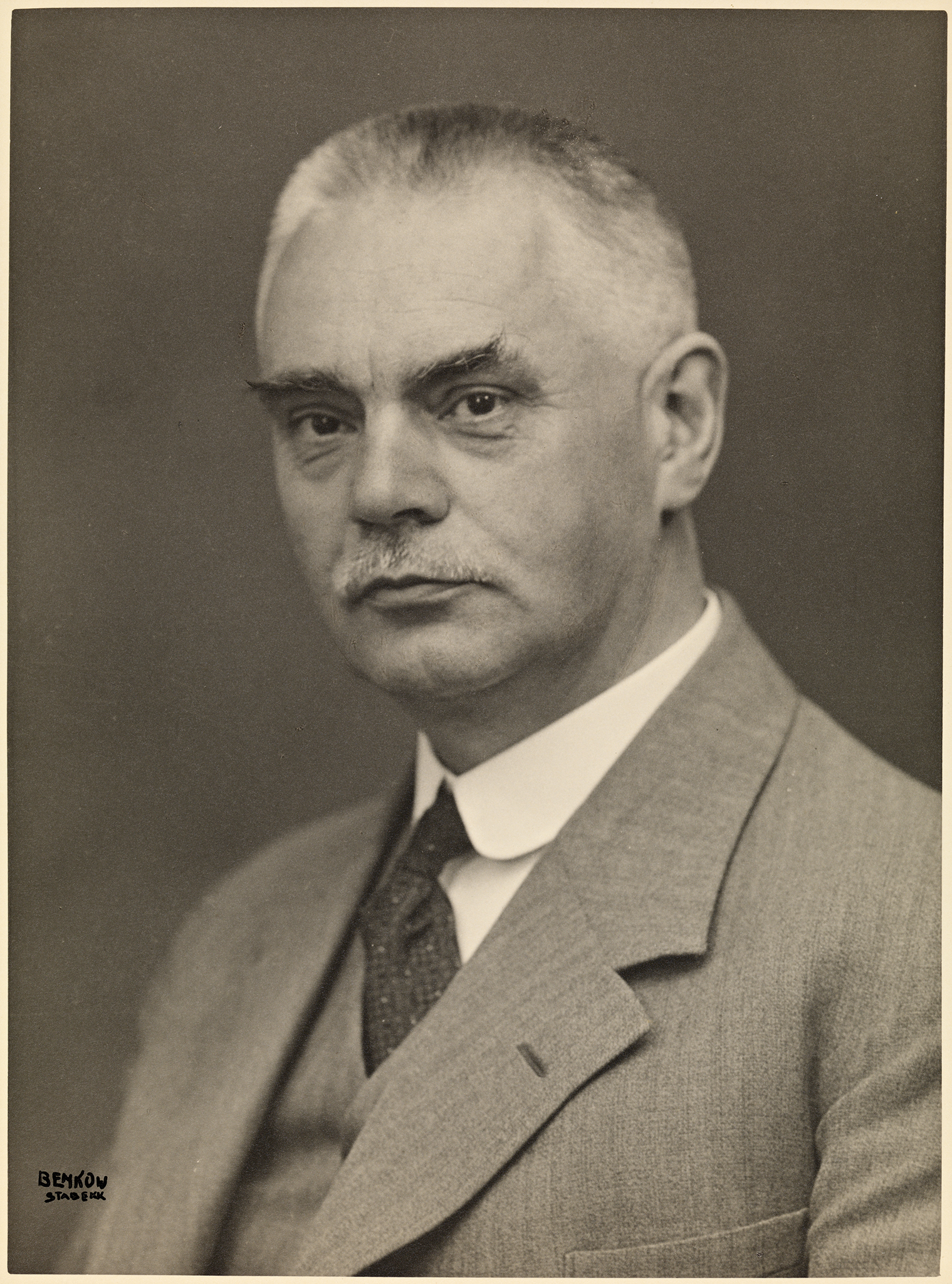
The history professor Halvdan Koht (1873–1965) was one of the Labour Party's foremost ideologues.

Popular socialism or people's socialism (Danish: Folkesocialisme) is a distinct socialist current from the Nordic countries. In that context, the term can be said to represent a distinct ideological tendency, originating from Aksel Larsen's split from the Communist Party of Denmark in 1956. Larsen founded the Socialist People's Party (SF), which placed itself between communism and social democracy.

In Norway, a similar party, named the Socialist People's Party was formed by an anti-NATO/anti-European Economic Community-split from the Labour Party and later became the backbone of the Socialist Left Party (SV). Alongside the Norwegian SV, the Danish SF identify their ideological base as popular socialism. In Sweden, the term has sometimes been used and there were at one point discussions within the rightist section of the Left Party on forming a political project with the Danish SF as model, but the split was eventually avoided. Inspired by green politics and democratic socialism, popular socialism places emphasis on grassroots democracy, social justice, and environmentalism. Popular socialist parties participate in democratic elections to gain clout and influence policy, but do not consider the power of government as their primary goal, preferring to work within participatory democratic systems on a local level.

== See also ==
- Democratic socialism
- Eurocommunism
- New Left
- Nordic Green Left Alliance
- Nordic model
- Pacifist Socialist Party
- Popular socialism (Central Europe)
- Social democracy
- Unified Socialist Party (France)
