= Michal Klusáček =

Czech politician and flight engineer

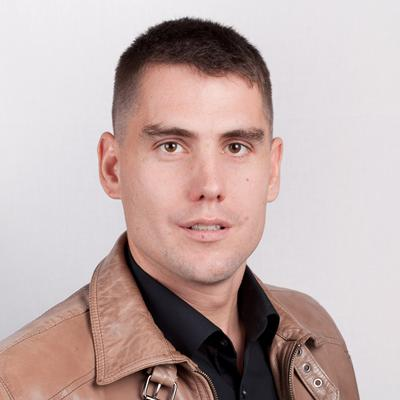

Leader of the Czech National Social Party
- Incumbent
- Assumed office 3 November 2012
- Preceded by: Jaroslav Rovný

Personal details
- Born: 23 October 1979 (age 46) Prague, Czechoslovakia
- Party: Czech National Social Party (2010–present)
- Education: Samara State Aerospace University
- Occupation: Politician; engineer

Michal Klusáček (born 23 October 1979) is a Czech politician and flight engineer.

== Biography ==
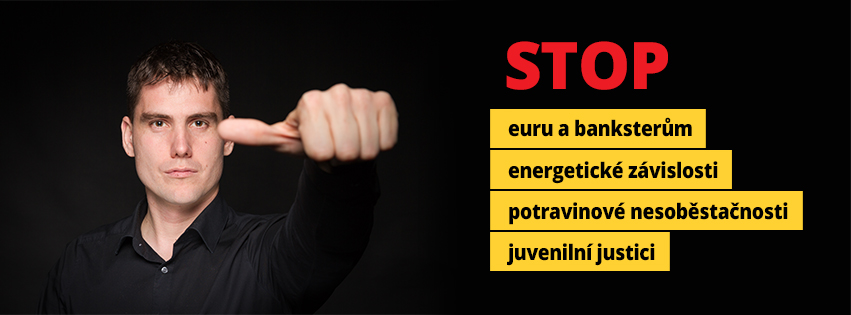
2014 election campaign of the Czech National Social Party

Between 2001 and 2007, Klusáček studied construction of air engines at Samara State Aerospace University. From 2012 to 2019, he was leader of the Czech National Social Party.

In May 2016, Klusáček and his party met with controversy when they covered up an information board at a memorial to executed Germans in Špindlerův Mlýn, stating that the board lacked historical context and those executed were sympathizers of the Third Reich. The information board was later restored to its original state. Due to disputes within the party, he was excluded in August 2019 by the new leadership around Vladislav Svoboda.

In the 2024 European Parliament election, Klusáček ran as a member of the Czech National Socialist Party in 11th place on the Stačilo! candidate list. He received 805 preferential votes, becoming the 9th alternate on the list.
