= Brno Noppeisen =

Bilingual workers newspaper issued in Brno

Brno Noppeisen was a bilingual workers newspaper issued in Brno in the 1870s. Brno Noppeisen was published jointly by German and Czech socialists in the city.
