= Barák Workers Association =

Workers Association

The Barák Workers Association (German: Arbeitervereinigung Barák) was a Czech educational organization in Austria during the interbellum years. The association was linked to the Czech National Socialist Party, and was an important pillar of the party in Austria.
