= František Ladislav Chleborád =

Doctor František Chleborád
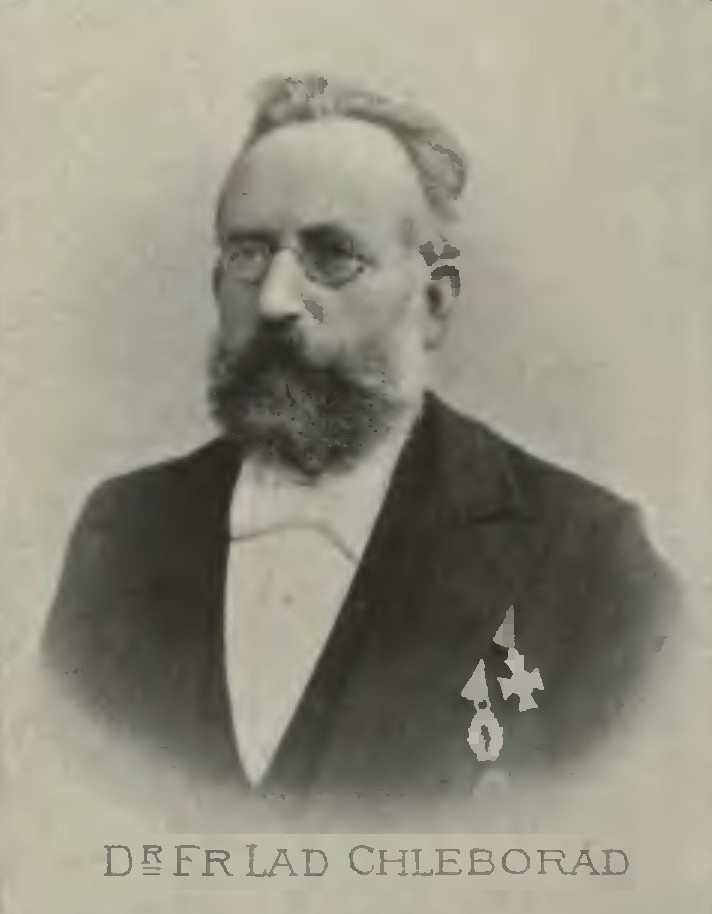
- František Chleborád before 1899
- Born: 24 November 1839; Habry, Bohemia, Austrian Empire
- Died: 20 July 1911 (aged 71); Saint Petersburg, Russian Empire
- Resting place: Saint Petersburg, Polish cemetery

Academic background
- Education: University of Prague
- Influences: Franz Hermann Schulze-Delitzsch

Academic work
- Discipline: political economy

František Ladislav Chleborád (24 November 1839 – 20 July 1911) was a Czech political economist and a pioneer of cooperatives.

== Biography ==
Born in Habry in Bohemia, part of the Austrian Empire, he graduated from Staroměstské gymnázium (lit. 'Old Town gymnasium') in Prague and went on to study law and political economy.

Being fluent in Bulgarian, Russian, German, Serbian or French, Chleborád travelled the world and became an honorary consul of the Republic of Venezuela. He held many posts during his active career, including the chairman of the Sokol in Brno, and leadership roles in financial institutions and banks.

Chleborád was prominent for founding the worker's cooperatives, named Oul (19th century Czech for 'beehive'), encouraging workers to unite and to be educated. The organization was inspired by the ideas of Schulze-Delitzsch. The Czech mutual aid movement then spread outside of Prague and was also established in Brno and Liberec.

He taught political economy at the University of Prague, writing influential textbooks, arguing for nationalist socialism. He was academically active at around the financial crisis of 1873.

In 1888, Chleborád emigrated to the Russian Empire, where he became the government's adviser on matters Slavic and financial. He died in Saint Petersburg in 1911.

== Works ==
Chleborád wrote many treatises on political economy, published in newspapers (such as Dělník and Dělnické Listy) and even wrote a poetic work on saints Cyril and Methodius:

- Boj o majetek (1884)
- Hospodářství vlastenecké (1868)
- Pomoc chudým dělníkům (1868)
- Soustava národního hospodářství politického (1869)
- Věštcové slávy. K oslavení tisícileté památky prvosvětitelů Slovanů sv. Cyrilla a Methoděje (1888) (poetry)

== See also ==
- Credit union
