= First courtyard of Prague Castle =

Courtyard at Prague Castle, Czechia

Coordinates: 50.0898°N 14.3985°E

Wrestling Titans Sousoší Souboj Titánů
- Sculptures
- Location: Prague Castle, Czech Republic
- Interactive map of Wrestling Titans

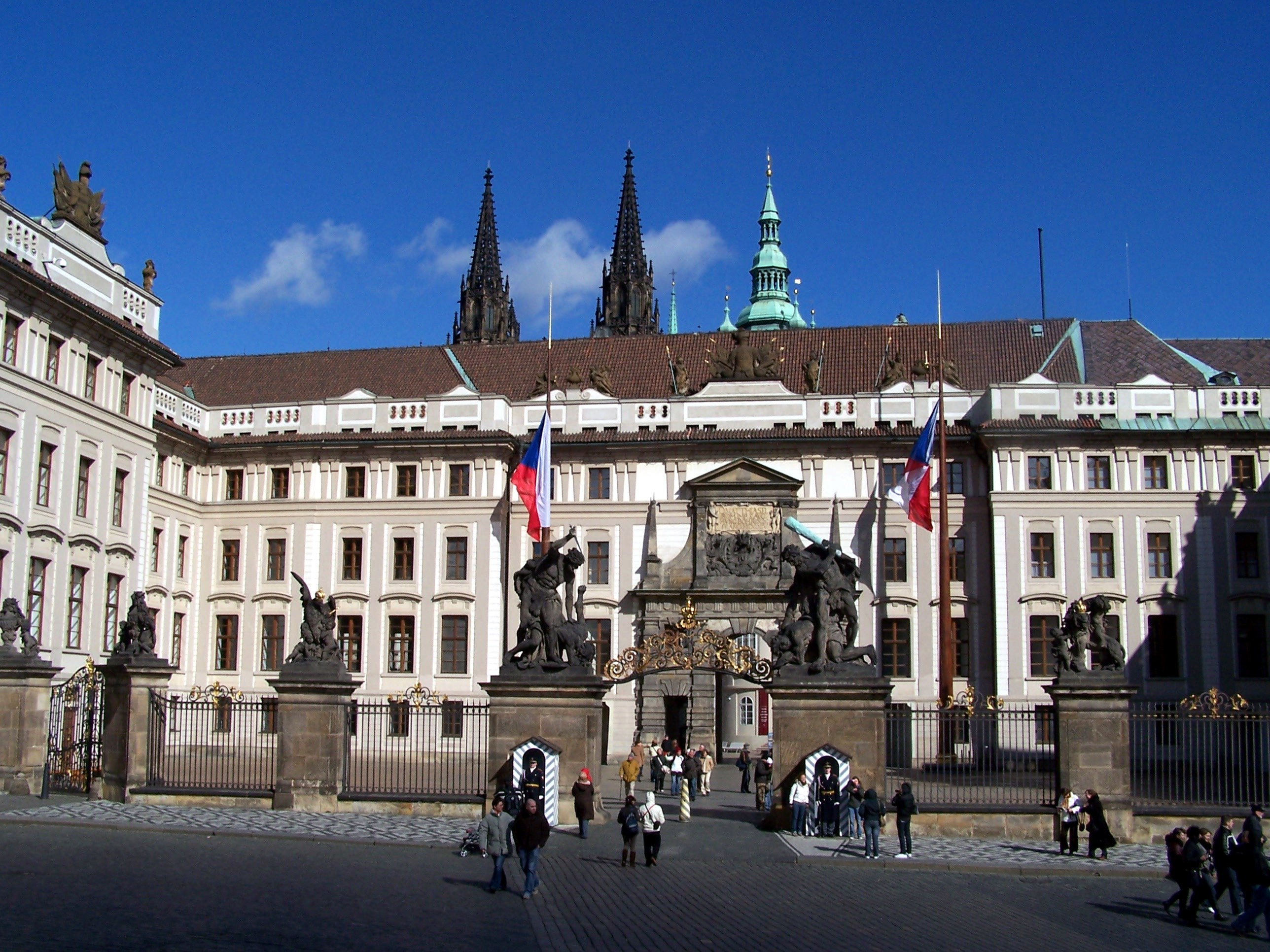
The courtyard in 2008

The first courtyard (Czech: První nádvoří Pražského hradu) is one of four at Prague Castle, in Prague, Czech Republic. Wrestling Titans is installed at the courtyard's entrance. The square was established in the 1760s.
