= Saint Wenceslas Chorale =

Czech church hymn

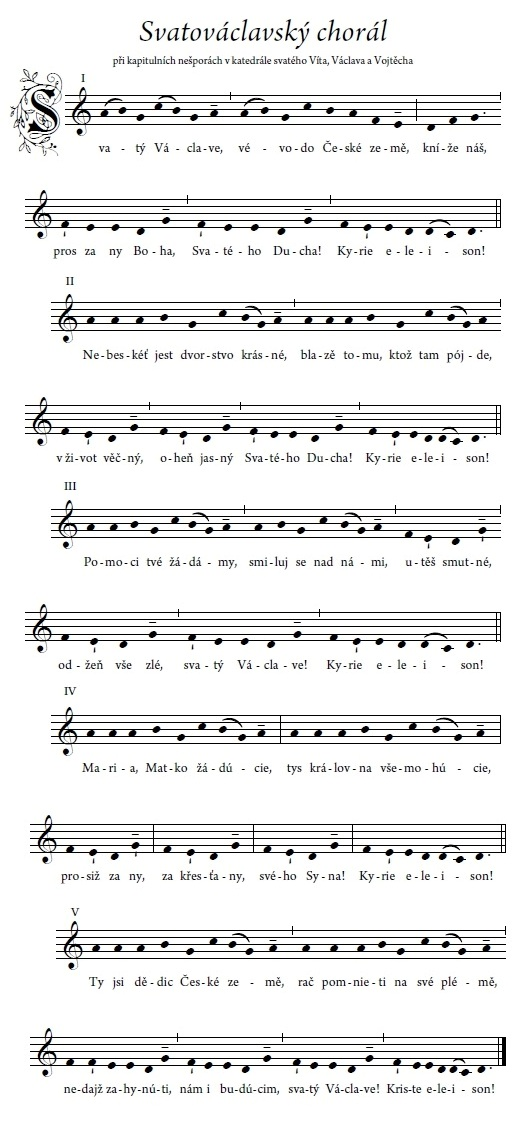
Saint Wenceslas Chorale as sung at Vespers in Cathedral of Saint Vitus, Wenceslaus and Adalbert in Prague, in modern notation.

Saint Wenceslas Chorale (Czech: Svatováclavský chorál) or simply Saint Wenceslas is a church hymn and one of the oldest known Czech songs and Czech religious anthems. Its roots can be found in the 12th century and it belongs to the most popular religious songs even today, and to the oldest still used European chants. The hymn is mentioned as "old and well-known" in a chronicle from the 13th century. Its strophic structure, language and undulating melody and harmonization also confirm that assumption. The original text of the song had three strophes. To the chant, originally in Old Czech, some new strophes have been added and also removed from it over the centuries. Its final form comes from the turn of the 18th and 19th centuries and in that version it is still used today.

The content of the anthem is a prayer to Saint Wenceslas, Duke of Bohemia and the Czech patron saint, to intercede for his nation with God to help them from injustice and ensure their salvation. The hymn is regularly sung today, usually at the end of a Sunday Mass or a major Christian holiday.

In 1918, in the beginnings of the Czechoslovak state, the song was discussed as a possible candidate for the national anthem.

== Modifications of the song ==
Saint Wenceslas Chorale inspired some Czech composers to the creation of variations on the theme. As well-known examples can be mentioned:

- Josef Suk: Meditation on St.Wenceslas chorale, op. 35a
- Vítězslav Novák: Svatováclavský triptych • toccata, ciacona and fugue, op. 70
- Pavel Haas: Suite for Oboe and Piano, Op. 17

A computer-generated audio rendition of the chorale
