= Václav Klofáč =

Czech politician and activist

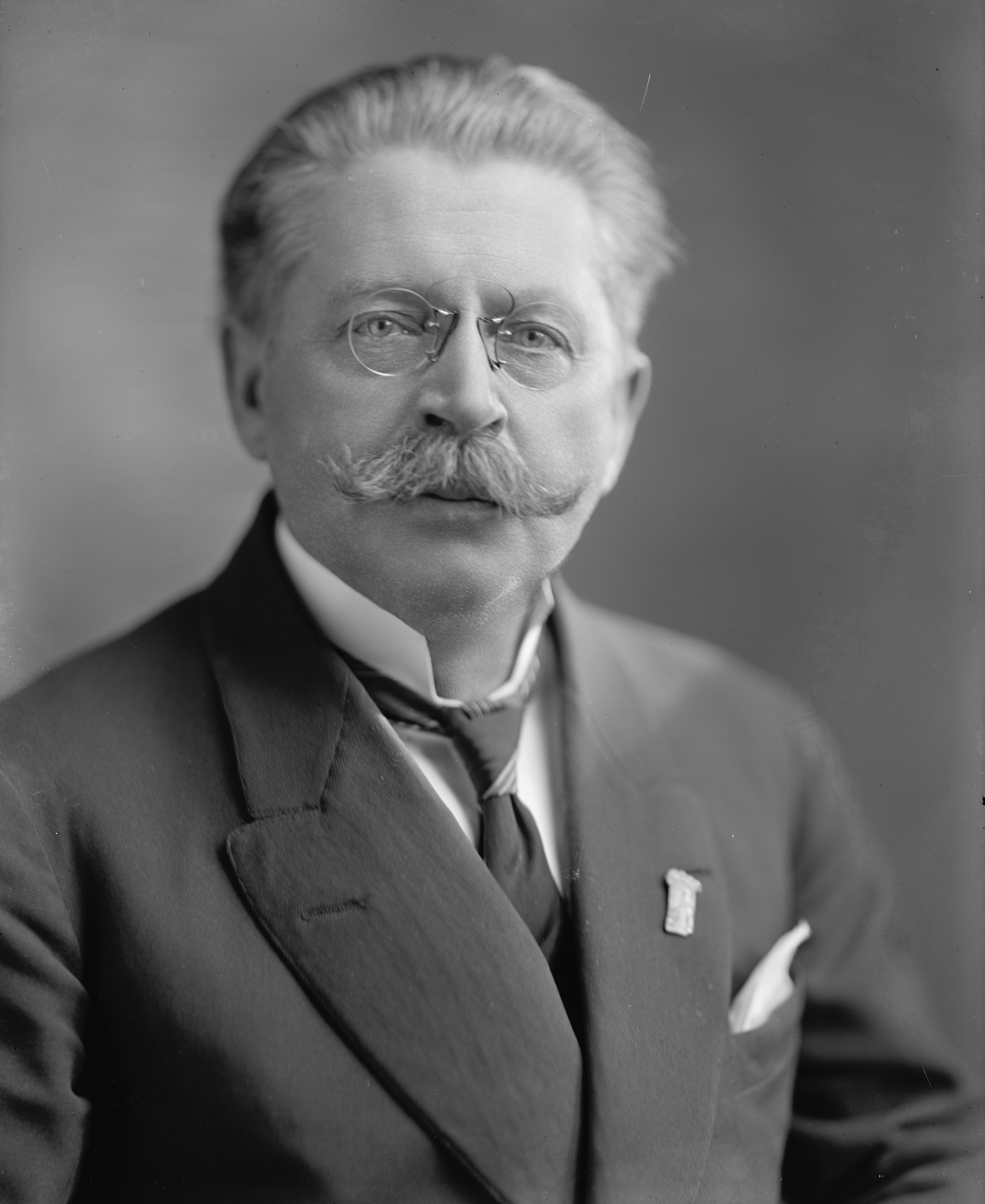
Klofáč in 1905

Václav Jaroslav Klofáč (21 September 1868 – 10 July 1942) was a Czech politician and one of the founders of the Czech National Social Party. Klofáč became one of the best known radical nationalist Czech politicians in the Habsburg monarchy.

== Biography ==
Václav Klofáč was born on 21 September 1868 in Německý Brod, Bohemia, Austria-Hungary (now Havlíčkův Brod, Czech Republic). He grew up in humble circumstances, the son of a courtroom messenger, he knew poverty and went through a number of experiences that allowed him to understand and sympathize with the working class. Klofáč's education began in Německý Brod Gymnasium and then at the University of Prague (later known as Charles University) in the late 1880s. He was originally enrolled in the Universities Medical School but transferred into the school of arts and sciences where he studied philosophy. Václav participated in journalism and student politics. His political career began during his years as a student at Charles University in Prague. While attending the University Klofáč became co-founder of the Czech students progressive movement. He was also involved in the Young Czech Party, who defeated the Old Czechs in the Reichstrat election of 1891, and frequently wrote for the Časopis Pokrového Studentstva. After graduation, Julius Gregr editor of Národní listy convinced Klofáč to write for the paper where he was quickly promoted to editor. But Klofáč became unhappy with what he viewed as the excessive compromising of the Young Czechs with the Habsburg government.

His frustrations with the Young Czechs led Klofáč to become one of the founders of the National Social party (originally the National Workers party) in 1898. He was elected to the Austrian parliament for the first time in 1901 along with his colleagues Václav Choc and Václav Fresl, where he used his seat in the parliament to attack the government for what he believed were its anti-Czech, militarist and Catholic policies. Unlike many nationalists of his day, Klofáč was an ardent supporter of women's right to vote. The stridency of his anti-Habsburg politics led to his arrest by the Austrian authorities on charges of treason in 1915. Although he was sentenced to death, Klofáč was amnestied in 1917 along with many other prominent Czech politicians. In 1939 Klofáč escaped a second incarceration, when Bohemia was occupied by the Germans, due to his impending death. From January 1919 to May 1920 Klofáč served as Czechoslovakia's minister of national defense.

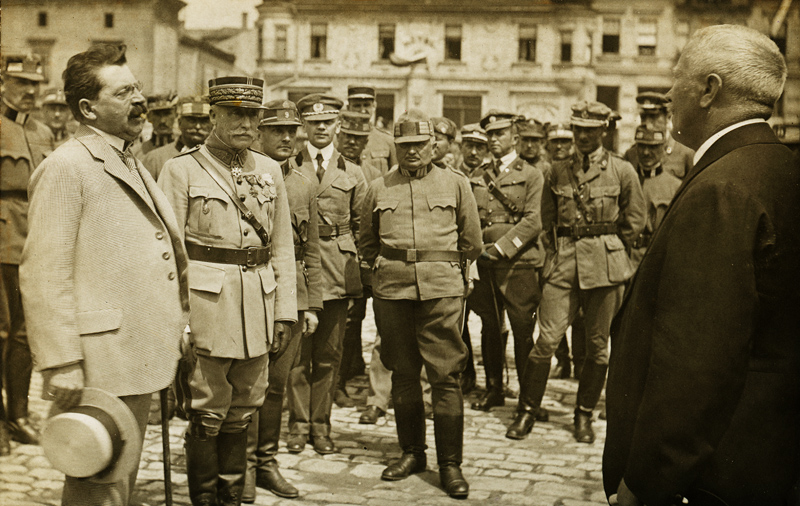
General Maurice Pellé with Minister of Defense Václav Klofáč and general Alois Podhajský at Uherský Brod, 1919

An avowed pacifist, Klofáč became the first Minister of Defense of Czechoslovakia. Klofáč transformed the recently defeated Austro-Hungarian army into the new Czechoslovak Army. He persuaded most men participating in the armed forces to accept their new civic responsibilities as citizen soldiers and to try and rid themselves of any negative views they had of the military, caused by their experiences in the Imperial and Royal Army. From 1920 to 1926, Kofláč served as vice-chairman and chairman of the Czechoslovak Senate. During this time he maintained harmony among delegates representing different interest. Václav Klofáč also helped organize the September 1926 Brno Congress of the Czechoslovak National Socialist Party.

A strong supporter of the first Czechoslovak president Tomáš Masaryk. From 1918 to 1938, Klofáč was a publicist for public understanding and support of political democracy and Masaryk's concept of the Czechoslovak state. Klofáč remained politically active until the late 1930s when he withdrew from political life to his country home, where he died in 1942.

Government offices
Preceded by -	Minister of Defence of Czechoslovakia; 1918–1920	Succeeded by Ivan Markovič
