= Elefánthy family =

Hungarian noble family

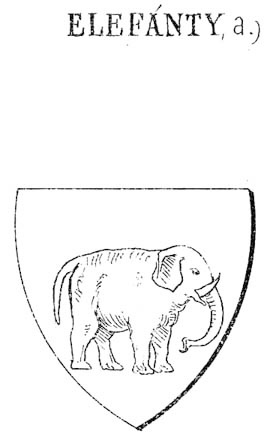
Elefánthy de Elephanth early coat of arms, 14th century

The House of Elefánthy (also spelled Elefánty or Elefánti) were one of the oldest noble families in the Kingdom of Hungary. At their peak during the Middle Ages, the family rose to an influential and wealthy position.

== Origins ==
The exact origins of the family are unknown. Some authors believe the Elefánthy to be a branch of the Ludány kindred, which itself was a branch of the genus Hont-Pázmány. The eminent 18th-century polymath Matthias Bel, in his Notitia Hungariae novae historic-geographia, writes that a 12th-century ancestor of the family was part of King Coloman's delegation to Sicily to propose a royal marriage. This ancestor was gifted an elephant in Sicily, which he brought back and presented to the King, who in return gave him the original estates in Nyitra County.

A more recent theory as to the unique name and coat of arms of the family suggests that Elefánth could have been a personal name, derived from the French Oliphant, an ivory horn made popular in court circles during the Middle Ages from the knightly romance Chanson de Roland. An ancestor of the family may have been named after some such splendid hunting horn.

An extensive study of the family name by Endre Tóth concluded that it originates from the personal, German name of Helfant. Due to the age of the family, Tóth suggests that the ancestor of the family came from Bavaria at the time of Géza, Grand Prince of the Hungarians or Stephen I of Hungary.

== History ==
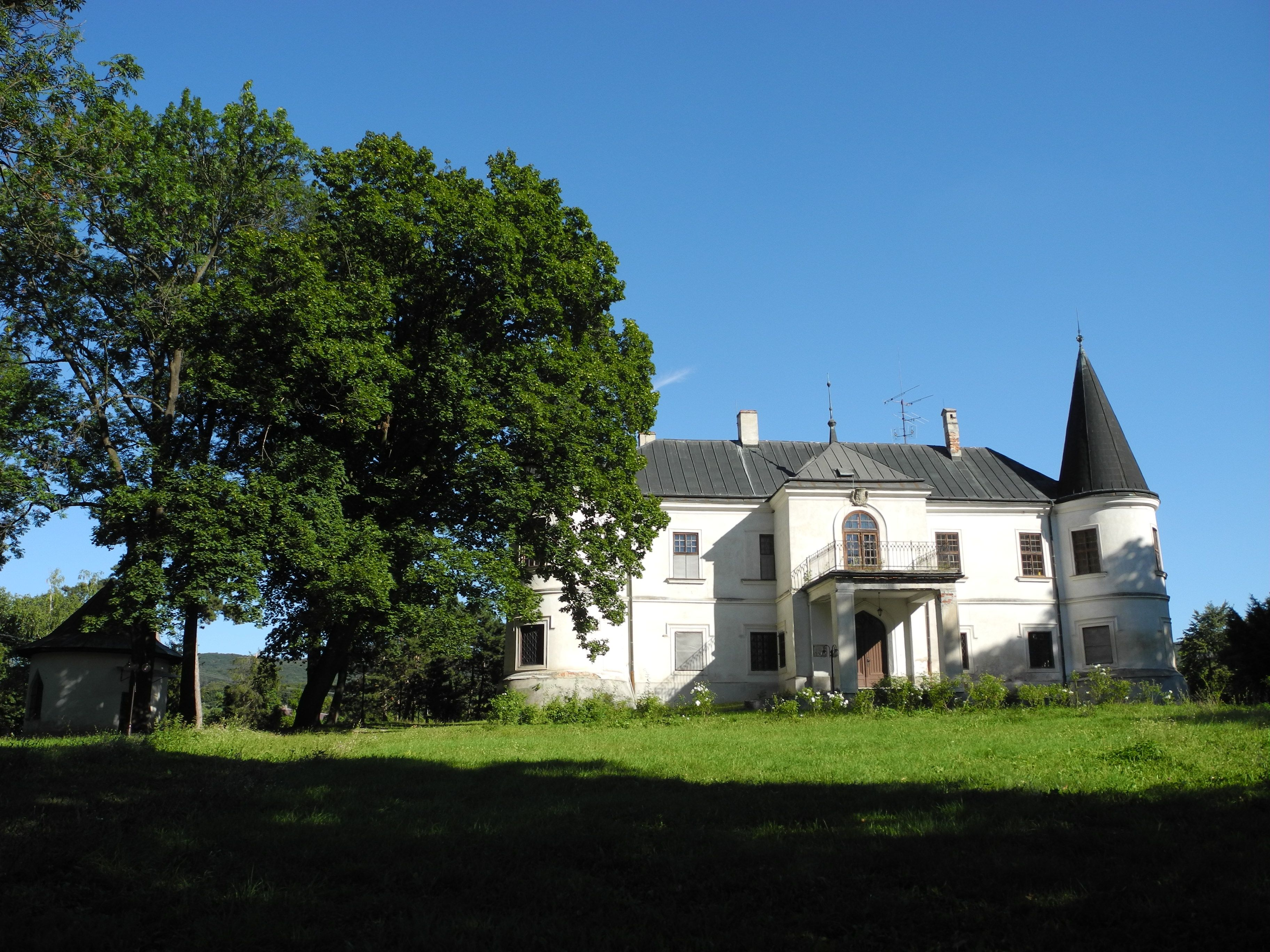
Horne Lefantovce manor, originally 13th-century moated castle

The oldest known member is Andrew the Red (Hungarian: "Vörös" András), mentioned in 1236 as lord of Elefánth.

Michael Elefánthy, documented in 1265, was Grand Master of the Royal Court.

From the 13th century the family owned a number of estates in Pozsony and Nyitra Counties. The family split into several branches early on and as a result, in 1323, the estates were permanently split between two of the major branches, the Felsőelefánt (today Horné Lefantovce, Slovakia) and Alsóelefánt (today Dolné Lefantovce, Slovakia) branches.

The family built and owned a 13th-century moated castle in Felsőelefánt, which was later enlarged and renovated a number of times.

In 1369, Master and Count (Comes) Desiderius Elefánthy founded a Pauline monastery in Felsőelefánt. It was rebuilt and incorporated into a very large stately home by the Edelsheim-Gyulai family, who kept the monastery church as a chapel and hall. Countess Ilona Edelsheim-Gyulai, wife of István Horthy, grew up there.

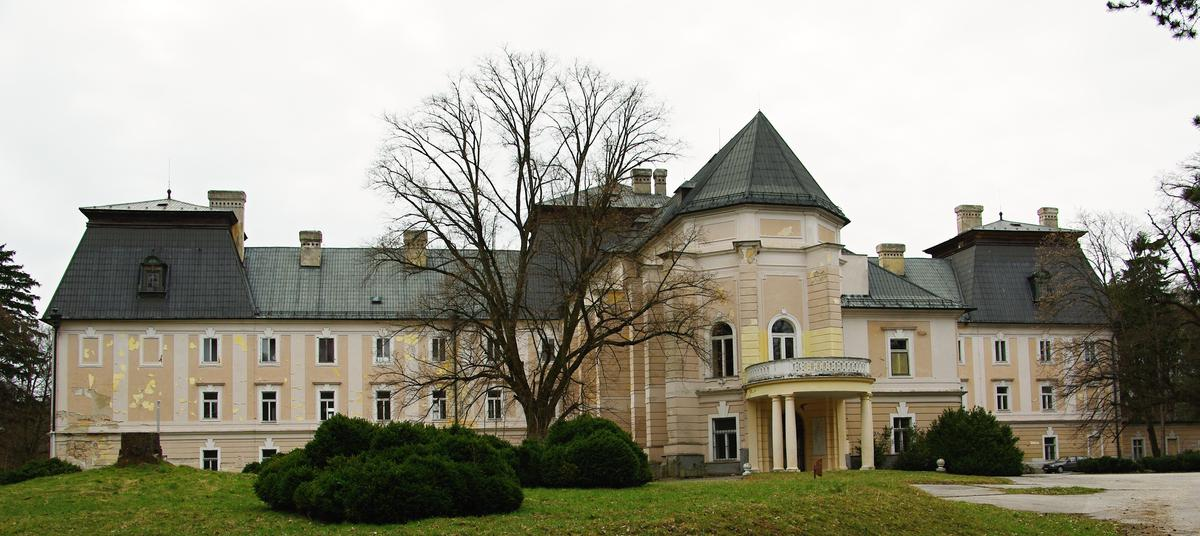
Edelsheim-Gyulai house in Horne Lefantovce, the original 14th-century monastic church is visible as the entrance-hall

Emeric Elefánthy was vice-ispán (vicecomes) of Nyitra County (1572–1573 and 1578–1580) as well as the commander-in-chief of the noble military levy.

His son Lawrence Elefánthy was also captain of the noble military levy in 1626, and vice-ispán of Nyitra County from 1633 to 1634. He was also a delegate at the Hungarian Diet.

His son Paul was also a captain of the noble military levy between 1645 and 1648. His brother Andrew was a noble judge in 1648.

Sándor Elefánthy de Alsó-felsőszentjános et Elefánt (1822–1896) was royal prosecutor, and mayor of Jászberény. His branch of the family moved to central Hungary in the 18th century.

== Heraldry ==
Since the 14th century, the Elefánthy family used the elephant as their symbol, a highly unusual device in Hungarian heraldry. The only noble indigenous, contemporaneous Hungarian coat of arms comparable to this was used by the Klebercz family (Klebersz, Kelepcsics) of Reca. On this basis, and other factors such as proximity of landed estates, some family historians have suggested a relation between the two families.
