= Klebercz family =

Noble family in the Kingdom of Hungary

The House of Klebercz (also spelled Klebersz, Klebecz, Kelepecz, Kelepcsics) were a noble family in the Kingdom of Hungary. Its three main branches were split between Pozsony, Nyitra and Zemplén counties.

== Pozsony branch ==
Peter Klebersz-Kelepcsics (c.1600 – 1665) was confirmed in the Hungarian nobility by Emperor Ferdinand II on 21 June 1633 along with his brothers John and Paul. He was most probably born in Trnava and was educated by the Jesuits there (predecessor of the present-day Eötvös Loránd University). Peter Klebersz was part of the trusted circle around Nikolaus Esterházy of Galantha, the Palatine of Hungary; he was an official at the Hungarian Royal Chamber in Pressburg (today Bratislava, Slovakia), and was the ispán of the Palatine's dominions with their centre in Senec (Sencz or Wartberg).

In 1650, Peter Klebersz writes a testament where he donates, upon his death, his estate of the Grosslingen island (now central Bratislava including the main Hviezdoslavovo square) to the Jesuits. He is the first nobleman to grant land to the Jesuits in Pressburg, thus assuring them with a continued and secure existence.

Peter Klebersz was also ispán of Senec for Ladislaus, Count Esterházy of Galantha, the next Head of House, who fell at the Battle of Vezekeny.

Klebersz held Royal office as the tax comptroller of the Senec tax authority from 1655 until his death in 1665. Senec one of the most important tax collecting centres in Upper Hungary due to the volume of cattle traffic moving from southern Hungary and the Balkans into Austria, with an income exceeding that of the capital, Pressburg's tax authority. Peter Klebersz owned his own noble (untaxable) manor in Senec. He married Katalin Bellussy, whose father Nicholas was the burgrave of Trnava. His daughter married George Fodor son of Stephen Fodor, burgrave of Senec, founding the prosperous line of Fodors of Puste Ulany. Peter's sons continued the Bratislava line.

Later, the Klebercz family of the Pressburg line also expand from Senec to nearby Reca. In the 18th century, one of the family members takes part in the noble uprising of Francis II Rákóczi, Prince of Transylvania. According to local legend, this member of the Klebercz family along with two colleagues kidnapped the Generalissimo of the Imperial Armies, Count Heister, when on one of their mounted raids in the area of Senec.

His brothers Paul and John left Pressburg and founded the Nyitra branch of the family.

== Zemplén branch ==
Andrew Klebecz, probably Peter's half brother, was confirmed in nobility in the same year 1633 by Emperor Ferdinand II.

His son Stephen married Judith Csenkey of Csenke, daughter of Albert Csenkey and Ilona Marczel in Pozsony County and gained part of the medieval estate there. The family would from then on be known as ‘Kelepecz of Csenke’ (csenkei Kelepecz).

Stephen Kelepecz of Csenke joined the noble uprising of Emeric Thököly, Prince of Transylvania, and during the conflict moved to the Thököly strongholds in Zemplén County. He was the castellan of Nagytárkány (Velke Trakany) castle from 1675 when it was in Thököly's control.

Ferenc Kelepecz de Csenke (1826–1890) was son of József Kelepecz and Anna Lázár. He was a volunteer lieutenant and captain during the Hungarian Revolution of 1848. He married Amália Holnapy de Pozsony.

Gusztáv Kelepecz de Csenke (1830–1869), brother of the above. Married Jozefa Komlóssy de Komlós et Csöpeny. Like his brother, he was a lieutenant in the 1848–1849 Hungarian Revolution and was captured at the Battle of Piski. Released in March 1849, he took part in Józef Bem's campaign in April/May. Raised to rank of captain of the 74th Patriotic Battalion in June and fights in Transylvania.
