= Czechoslovakism =

Ideology of close Czech-Slovak relations

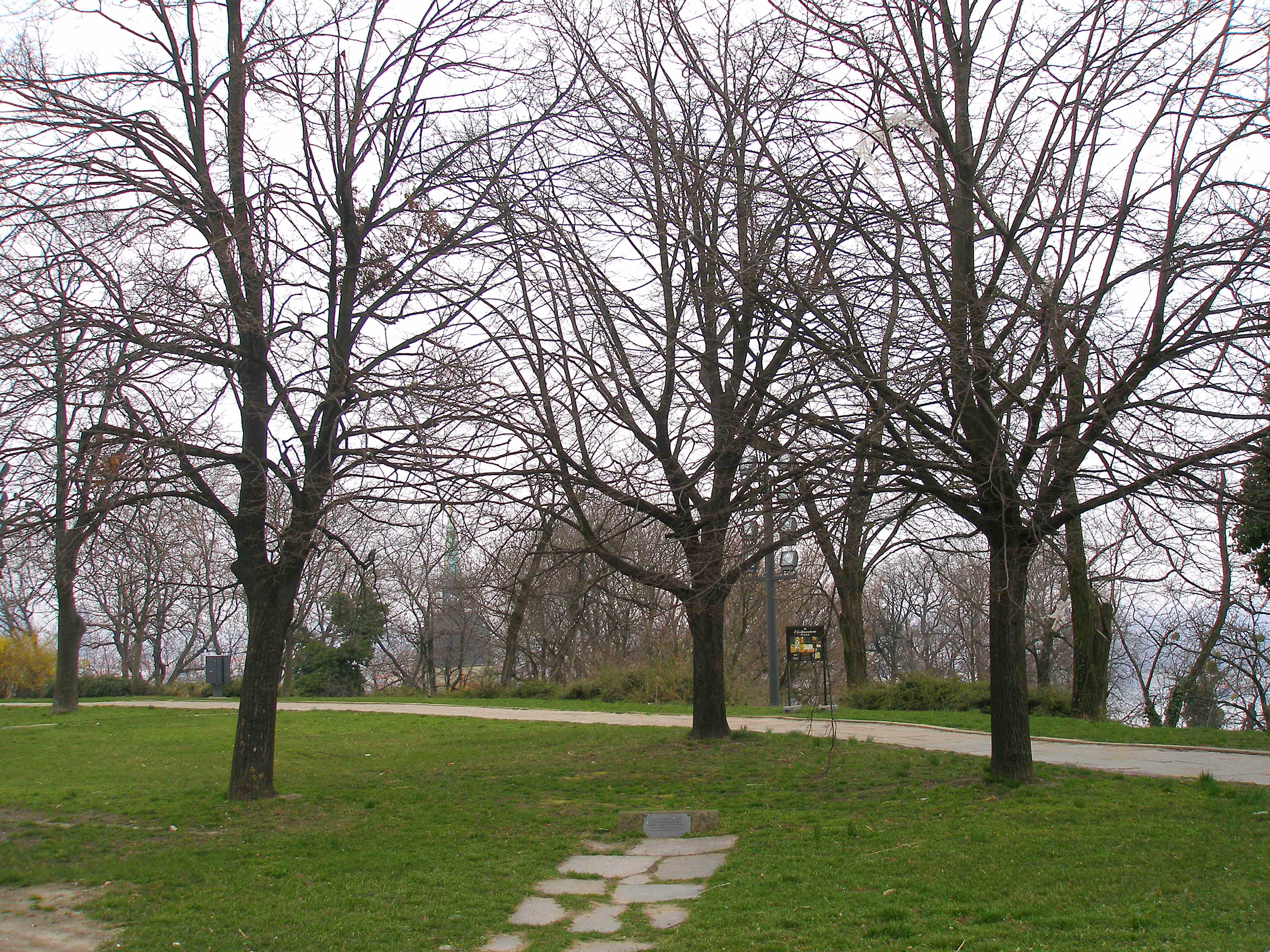
Three tilias, symbol of Czech and Slovak unity, near Bratislava castle

Czechoslovakism (Czech: Čechoslovakismus, Slovak: Čechoslovakizmus) is a concept which underlines reciprocity of the Czechs and the Slovaks. It is best known as an ideology which holds that there is one Czechoslovak nation, though it might also appear as a political program of two nations living in one common state. The climax of Czechoslovakism fell in 1918–1938, when as a one-nation-theory it became the official political doctrine of Czechoslovakia; its best known representative was Tomáš Masaryk. Today Czechoslovakism as political concept or ideology is almost defunct; its remnant is a general sentiment of cultural affinity, present among many Czechs and Slovaks.

== Antecedents ==
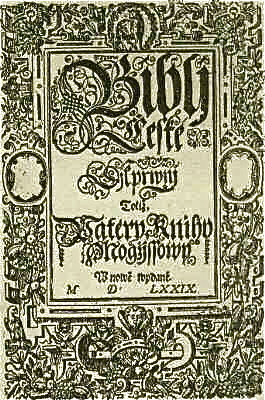
Bible of Kralice

Except some 70 years of Great Moravia in the early Medieval era, until the 20th century the peoples in the basins of Upper Elbe, Morava, Váh, Nitra and Hornád had never lived in a common state. Throughout ages they were gradually developing various and not necessarily conflicting identities, like Czechs, Bohemians, Moravians, Slavs, Slovaks, Slovjaks, Czechoslavs, Hungaroslavs and other, also hybrid concepts. These identities might have been constructed along dynastic, ethnic, cultural, religious or territorial lines and might have been embraced by various groupings, from few intellectuals to large rural masses. The current which emphasised some sort of general commonality between Slavic people living West and East of the White Carpathians was based on language. In the late 16th century the Bible was first completely translated into Czech from original languages and its vernacular version came to be known as Bible of Kralice. In the early 17th century Bible kralická and its linguistic standard, later known as bibličtina, was accepted for religious use in Protestant Slavic communities both West and East of the White Carpathians.

In the late 18th century the Slavic Protestant circles centered in Preßburg went beyond the purely religious usage of bibličtina and elaborated on a broader concept of common culture, shared by all Czech-related people. In 1793 Juraj Ribay worked out Projekt ústavu alebo spoločnosti slovensko-českej medzi Slovákmi v Uhorsku, a draft of educational institution to be based on Czech language; thanks to efforts of Bohuslav Tablic and Martin Hamaliar in 1803 the Preßburg Lyceum opened the chair "řeči a literatury československej"; in the 1810s Juraj Palkovič started to publish Týdenník aneb Císařské královské Národní noviny, a weekly which advanced a common Czech-related cause; in 1829 a number of scholars founded Společnost česko-slovanská, a cultural and education association which set branches also further East, e.g. in Késmárk and Lőcse; some activists established a network of bookstores and tried to propagate Czech literature. These initiatives did not exactly advocate a common Czech and Slovak cause; as the Slovak identity was at that time extremely vague, they rather tried to advance Czech as cultural model for Slavic people of Upper Hungary.

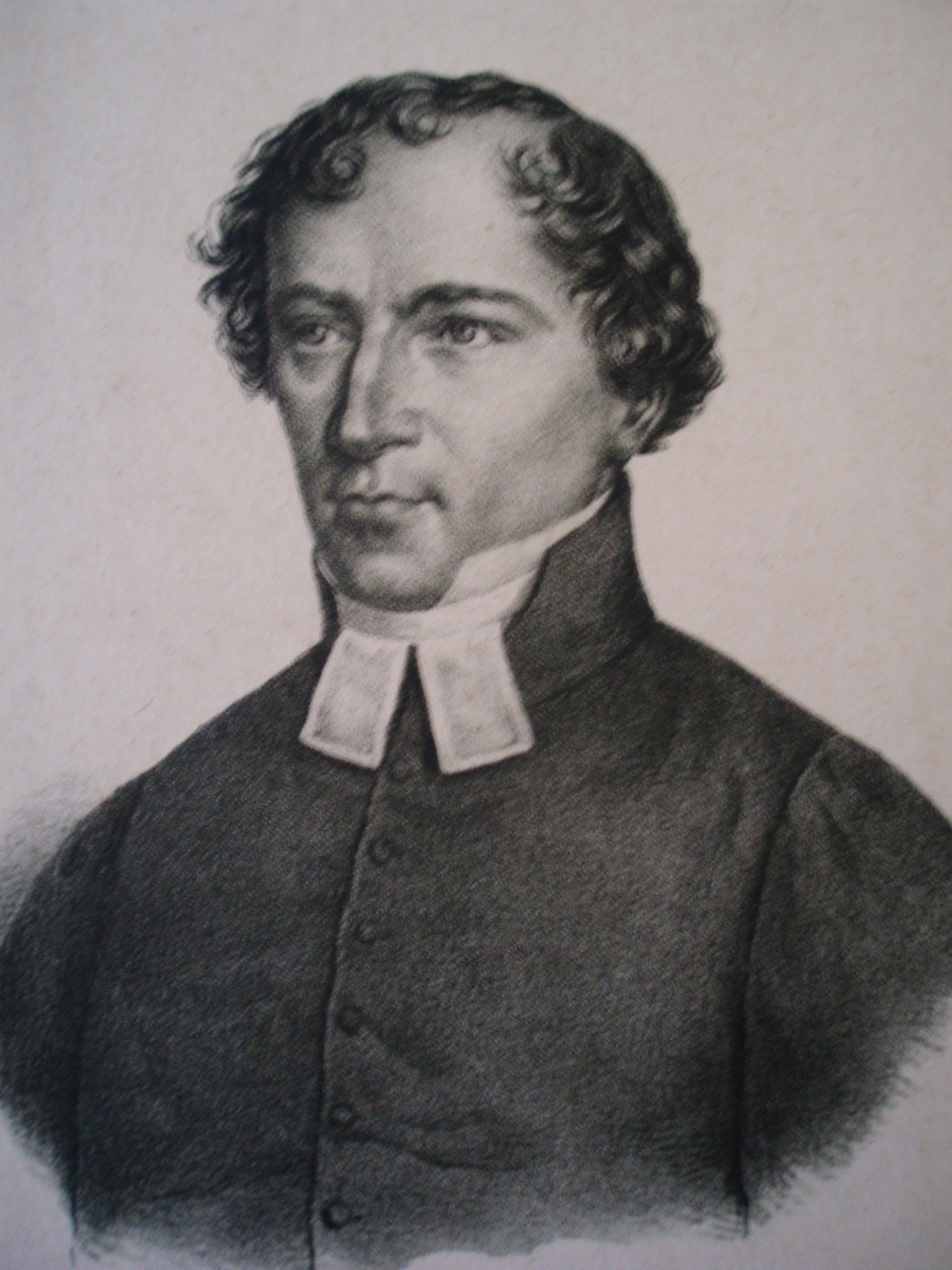
Jan Kollár

The current of building a common Slavic community centered upon Czech culture climaxed in mid-19th century thanks to activity of Jozef Šafárik and especially Jan Kollár, the latter graduate of the Preßburg Lyceum himself. A poet, scientist and politician, as ideologue he advanced the cause of Pan-Slavism. His monumental opus was written mostly in archaic Czech, though in the 1840s he tried to merge it with some Slovak features. However, he was opposed from two different angles. The trend towards buildup of Slovak literary language, commenced by Bernolák mostly to counter Protestantism already in the late 18th century, diverted from religious issues and assumed a decisively national flavor; championed by Štúr, Hurban and Hodža it opposed a Czech-focused perspective. On other hand, Prague-based representatives of purely Czech cultural vision like Jungmann or Palacký also considered Kollár's efforts harmful. The result was that with death of Šafárik and Kollár the idea of Czech-based linguistic unity was gradually dying out.

== Pre-Czechoslovakism ==
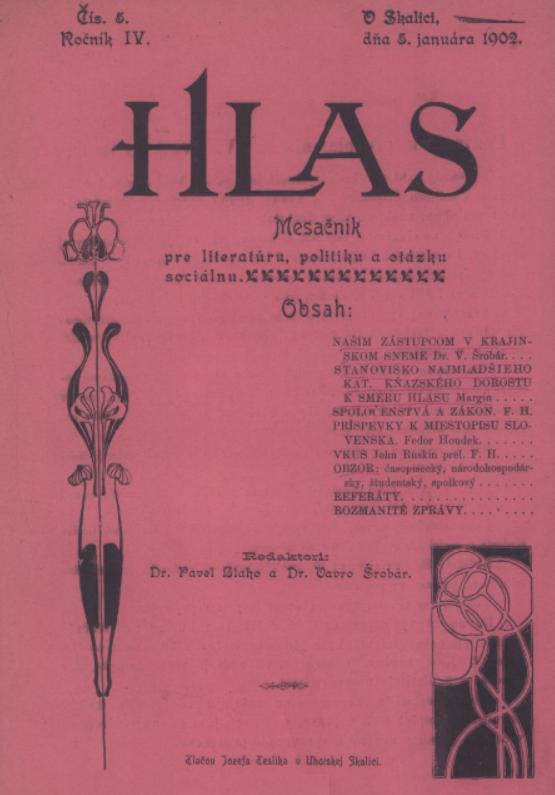
Hlas

In the late 19th century the concept of Czech-focused affinity was reduced to general cultural sphere. Institutional outposts advocating a common cause were few, isolated and with limited impact. In 1882 the Slovak students in Prague set up Detvan, organisation which raised funds to send Slovaks to Czech gymnasia and to the Charles University in Prague; in 1895 it evolved into Českoslovanská jednota. Some one-off events, e.g. a 1895 Czech-Slavic ethnographic exhibition in Prague generated much interest, though they were not exactly focused on a joint Czech and Slovak cause. Among periodicals the key one was Hlas, established in 1892 in Szakolca; its contributors, led by Vavro Šrobár, came to be known as "Hlasici". Another periodical, far less important, was Prúdy, since 1909 issued in Prague. The level of social integration was marginal, with few hundred Slovak students in Prague and perhaps much lower number of Czechs in Preßburg. The rate of Czech-Slovak intermarriage was low, lower than the Czech-German and the Slovak-Hungarian one. There were no common Czecho-Slovak political parties, cultural, sporting, leisure or social organisations. However, a number of Czech prints, including high-quality periodicals, were fairly popular in Slovak-populated areas.

Except the 1848 proposal of Palacký politicians on both sides did not go beyond the state borders when drafting their own designs. The Czechs focused on gaining some sort of political autonomy within Austria, usually intended for the provinces of Bohemia, Moravia and Silesia. Their demands were based on historical arguments related to the so-called lands of the Czech crown; as Slovak-speaking territories had never been part of the concept, pointing to a common Czech-Slovak cause would have had ruined this logic. The Slovaks struggled to cope with state-sponsored Magyarization and merely aimed to build an institutional network of cultural and education outposts within Hungary; with just 1 deputy in the Budapest parliament their chances to influence the official Hungarian politics were extremely slim. Until 1914 neither Czechs nor Slovaks have seriously advocated independence, let alone independence of a common state of both Czechs and Slovaks.

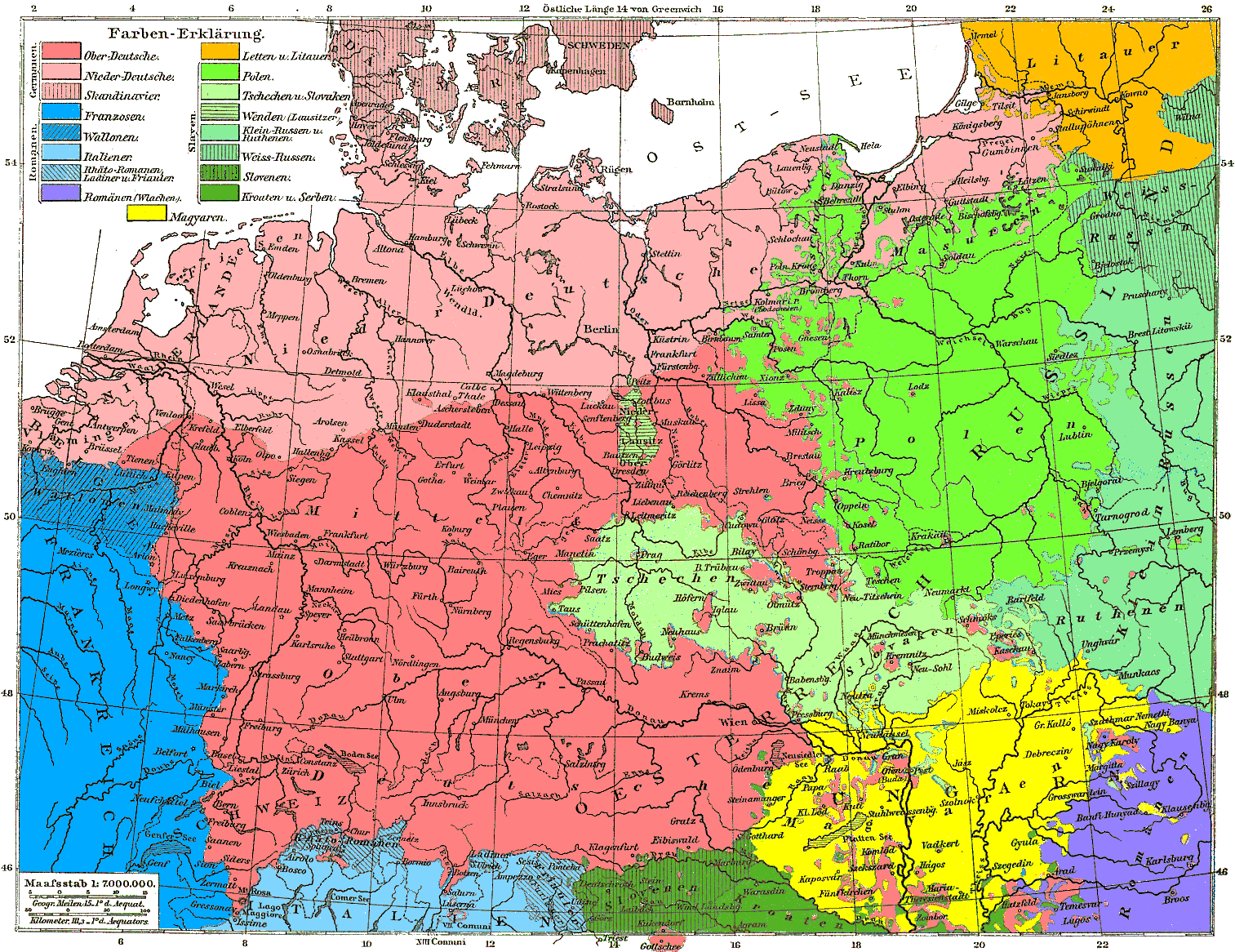
Czechs and Slovaks in one color (light green) on ethnic map, 1880s.

Though the adjectives "Czechoslovak" or very rarely "Slovakoczech" were in circulation in both languages (usually standing for Czech type of Slav), the term "Czechoslovakism" was not in use prior to 1914. When applied retroactively to the period, it could have denoted 4 various concepts of commonality: 1) that Slovaks form part of the Czech nation; 2) that Slovaks are somewhat distinct branch of the Czech people; 3) that Slovaks and Czechs are equal components of one Czecho-Slovak nation and 4) that Slovaks and Czechs are distinct nations united by common political interest. It seems that most Czech-speakers tended to perceive Slovak-speakers within the first two perspectives; to them "Slovaks" were like "Moravians", but even poorer and more backward. Slovak-speakers were far less advanced in terms of embracing a common identity; some regarded themselves as part of a Czechoslovak tribe of the Slav nation, some as Slovaks, some as Hungarian Slavs akin to Czechs; however, most of them had already some notion of Slovak individuality.

== Nascent ideology ==
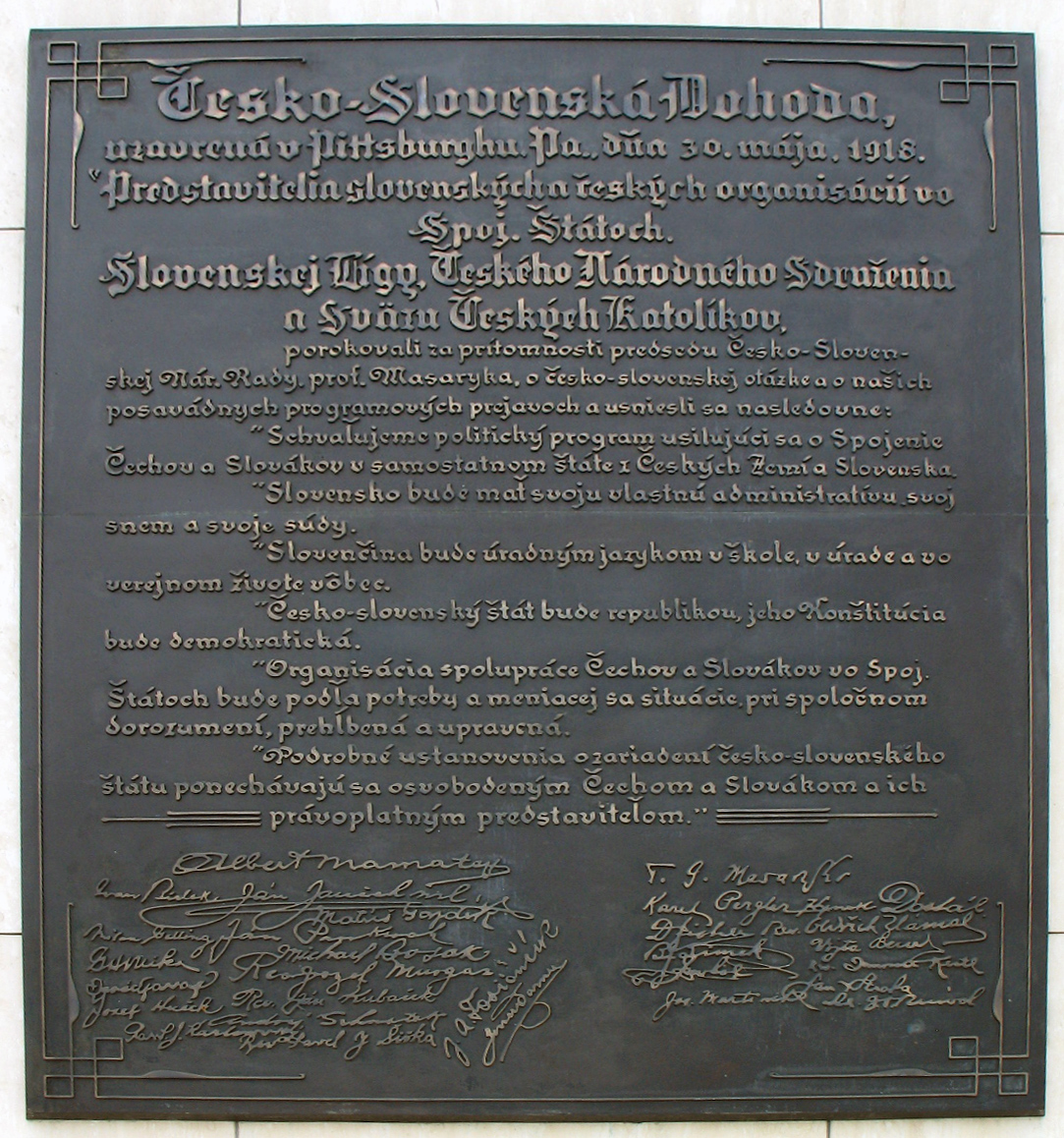
Pittsburg Agreement plaque

In 1914 many Czech politicians left Austria-Hungary to advocate an independent Czech state; according to Masaryk, it would consist of the Austrian provinces of Bohemia, Moravia and Silesia and Slovak-inhabited areas of Hungary. The related documents referred to "the Czech nation"; the same perspective was present in other documents of Czech exiles, e.g. in a 1915 booklet Bohemia's claim for freedom, issued by the Czech Committee in London. A different approach was agreed between two US-based groups, Czech National Alliance and Slovak League; known as the Cleveland Agreement of October 1915, it opted for a common state of two separate nations; at one point it referred to a federation and at another to Slovak autonomy. In early 1916 the Czech Foreign Committee in Paris, freshly joined by a Hlasici-related politician Milan Štefánik, renamed itself to Czechoslovak National Council, though they kept speaking of the Czech nation. In 1917-1918 the Council published a number of pamphlets, referring either to Czechoslovak or Czech nation.

Back home politicians grouped in Czech Union declared their loyalty to the Habsburgs; in 1917 they advocated an entity within the empire which would unite "all branches of Czechoslovak people". In May 1918 a Diet of Czech Lands demanded independence for the Czech nation "and its Slovak branch". The Slovak national assembly in Liptószentmiklós of May 1918 demanded recognition of self-determination rights, including "the Hungarian branch of the Czechoslovak tribe", but another assembly in Turócszentmárton spoke in name of the Slovak nation and openly supported independence within Czechoslovak statehood. In May 1918 Slovak and Czech exile organisations signed Pittsburgh Agreement, approved by the Czechoslovak council in Paris; it opted for a Czechoslovak state, but mentioned Czech and Slovak nations separately in the common state with common government. In July a Czechoslovak National Committee was set up in Prague; the body advocated a Czech-Slovak state but referred either to the Czech or to the Czechoslovak nation.

Czechoslovak declaration of independence, 1918

In September 1918 the US recognised the Paris council as a Czechoslovak government; in liaison with politicians in Prague, this body in name of the Czechoslovak nation declared independence of Czechoslovakia on October 18. Unaware of this, two days later a Slovak assembly in Turócszentmárton formed a Slovak National Council; its declaration referred to "Czechoslovak nation", "Slovak nation" as part of "the Czecho-Slovak nation" and "Slovak branch" of the Czech nation. In November 1918 Czech deputies to the Vienna parliament formed National Czechoslovak Assembly, which declared itself representative of "Czech nation". The Paris Council in liaison with the Prague Committee promulgated a provisional constitution and agreed on composition of the constituent National Assembly; 254 Czech seats were filled according to recent elections to the Austrian Reichsrat, while 55 Slovaks mostly hand-picked by Šrobár were co-opted later.

Though prior to 1914 Czecho-Slovak political co-operation was close to non-existent, in the late 1910s both in Czech and Slovak political circles the idea of a common state emerged triumphant; there were no serious competitive projects based on a separate Czech or Slovak state. One theory holds that with the Habsburg Monarchy collapsing, Czechs and Slovaks realised they could politically take advantage of their cultural affinity. Another theory claims that the concept of common state was mostly anti-German and anti-Hungarian; the Czechs and the Slovaks realised that in their own nation-states they might not control sizeable and economically privileged minorities.

== Doctrine at work ==
Czechoslovak CoA (1920–1938)

The Czechoslovak state was defined in 1920 Constitution and other documents adopted by the National Assembly and then the first elected parliament; in the former body the Slovaks formed 18% and in the latter 15%. The source of all power in the country was specified as "Czechoslovak nation" and indeed later official statistics consistently did not distinguish between Czechs and Slovaks; the official language was a "Czechoslovak language". The coat of arms included combined Czech and Slovak symbols, but the latter in a secondary position; the flag reproduced old Czech white-red pattern but with a blue wedge added. The anthem combined the Czech Kde domov můj? and the Slovak Nad Tatrou sa blýska. The administrative system initially adopted was a unitary one; the country was not divided into federative components but into 23 administrative units, though the government included the post of "Minister for Slovakia". In 1928 Czechoslovakia was divided into 4 lands, with presidents and own representation. Slovakia became one of them, for the first time in history its borders having been officially defined.

Czechoslovakism advanced as ideology had slight Czech bias, visible e.g. in school textbooks, and tended to promote a Czech vision, e.g. when discussing Hussitism. In terms of practice, in most integrated state institutions (e.g. railways, post, army) the prevailing if not the only language was Czech, but in local administration Slovak and Czech were used, officially as the same Czechoslovak language. Schools in respective territories were using Czech and Slovak; textbooks for them were also in Czech and in Slovak. Czechs clearly dominated among the political strata. Slovakia was slightly under-represented in terms of number of seats assigned to the land in the parliament. In central Czechoslovak administration Slovaks amounted to less than 2%. In turn Czechs were over-represented – sometimes dramatically – in state-controlled jobs in Slovakia, though it resulted from lack of sufficiently skilled Slovaks rather than from Czechization. Clear economic assessment had not been produced so far; however, scholars suggest that compared to her disproportionally small fiscal contribution Slovakia was on the receiving end in terms of total state expenditures, even though they might not have been proportionate to Slovakia's population.

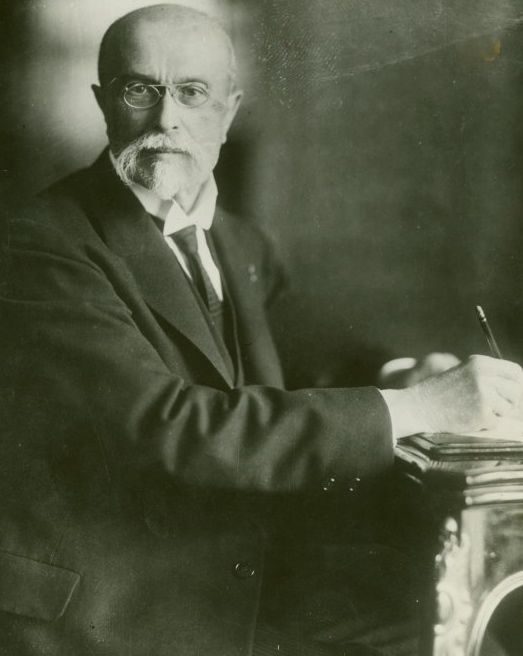
Tomáš Masaryk

In political strata the key proponent of Czechoslovakism was Hrad, an informal group composed mostly of Czechs and related to president Masaryk; he was also the chief ideologue of Czechoslovakism. It has been largely accepted as official state concept; most political parties either renamed themselves to "Czechoslovak" or dropped any national references. A Czech nationalism has not emerged; the Slovak one has gradually taken the shape of Slovak People's Party, known as "ľudáci". Under leadership of Andrej Hlinka it grew to the strongest party in Slovakia and was increasingly critical about the alleged Czech bias. The central government adopted a number of measures supposed to defuse Slovak discontent, like administrative reform of 1928, increased investments and personal policy, including the premiership of a Slovak, Milan Hodža. However, in the late 1930s ľudáci already demanded political autonomy, even though they declared full loyalty to Czechoslovak state as the only defence line against German and Hungarian revisionism.

== Crisis ==
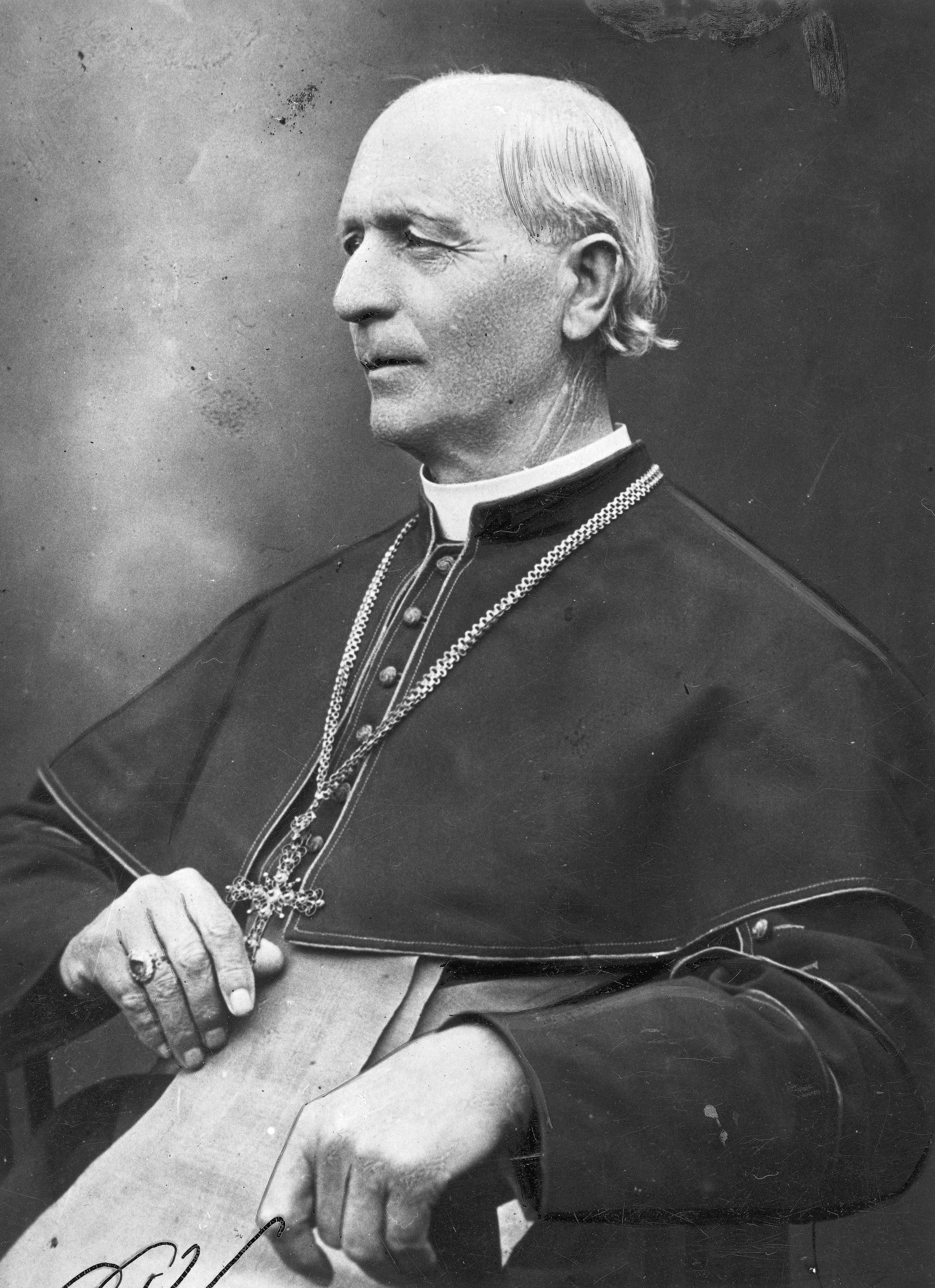
Andrej Hlinka

In the mid-1930s it was already visible that among the Slovak population Czechoslovakism – if ever genuinely popular – was in retreat. Apart from Czech predominance resulting from their numerical superiority and economic strength, the supposed reason for this demise was also the ideology itself. It was visibly Czech-biased; moreover, Slovak nationalists were dismissed as Magyarones, traitors supportive of Magyarization, a reference to 19th century theory which opposed buildup of Slovak language as an attempt first to separate Slovaks from Czechs and then to turn them into Hungarians. Some ľudák leaders were under police surveillance, some of their rallies were banned, their press tribunes were suspended for brief periods and few politicians were at times detained, though all measures were firmly based in constitutional order and they have never turned into state-sponsored systematic persecution.

Repeated ľudáks' autonomy demands were accepted by the Czechoslovak parliament in November 1938, in wake of major European political turmoil caused by German territorial demands versus Czechoslovakia and when the southern belt of Slovakia was about to be handed over to Hungary. In aftermath of the Sudetenland crisis and fearing total break-up of the country, the Czech deputies consented to the Slovak draft. Slovakia became a fully autonomous unit with own government, administration and special budgetary provisions; some overall Czechoslovak issues, e.g. presidential elections, were subjected to consent of qualified majority of the Slovak assembly. The constitutional amendment abandoned the original concept of Czechoslovak nation and referred to Czech and Slovak nations; the country was renamed from Czechoslovak to Czecho-Slovak Republic. This setup lasted only few months; in March 1939 the prime minister of autonomous Slovakia and the ľudák leader Jozef Tiso declared total independence. At the time Czech lands were overrun by German troops and soon got incorporated into the Reich as Protectorate of Bohemia and Moravia.

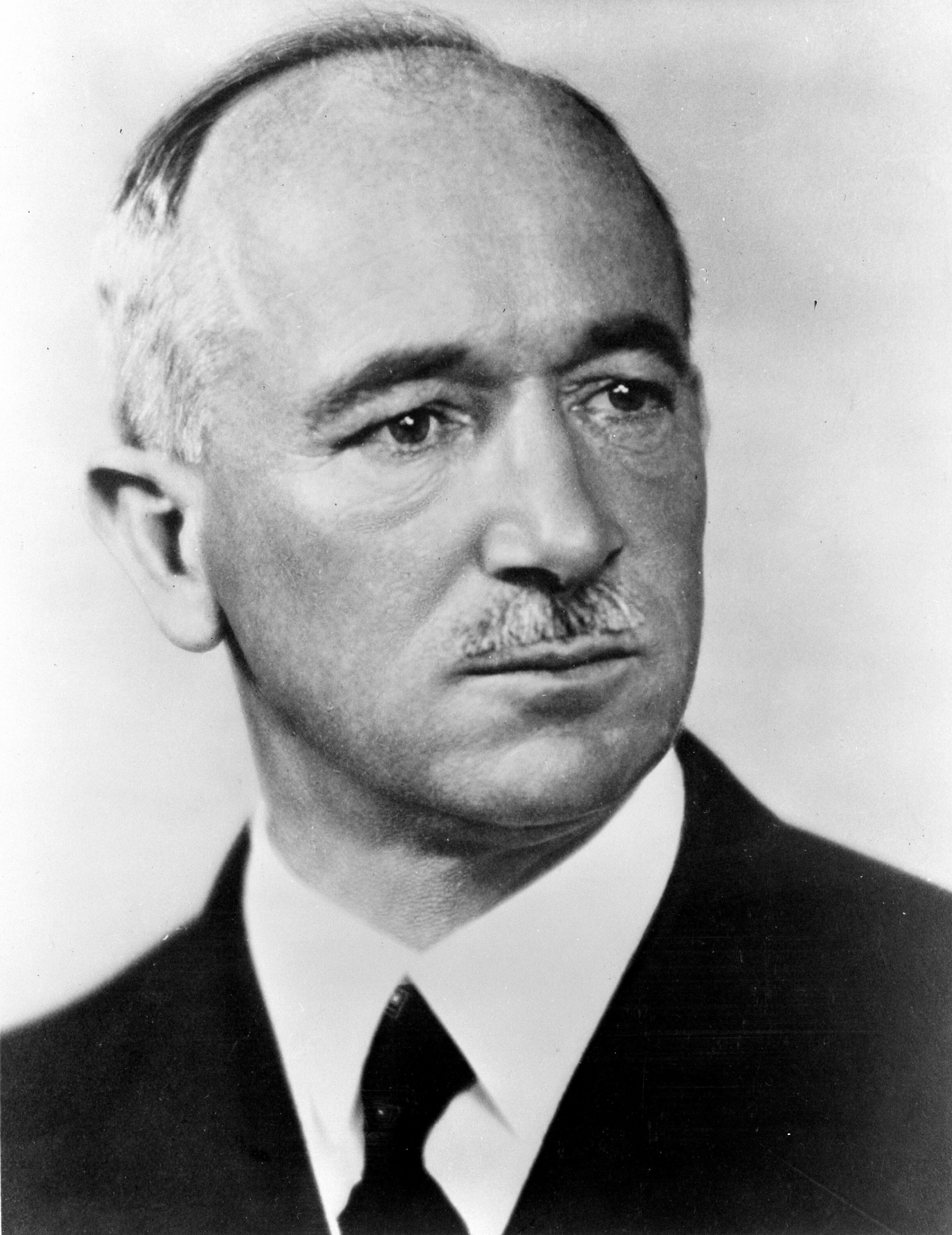
Edvard Beneš

In 1939-1945 the chief exponent of Czechoslovakism was the London-based Czechoslovak government in exile led by Jan Šrámek and especially by the president in-exile, Edvard Beneš; Czechoslovakism was popular also among some sympathetic British historians, like Seton-Watson. Officially the exile Czechoslovak structures not only refused to recognise the post-September-1938 political changes but they also stuck to the theory of one, Czechoslovak nation; it was advanced as late as in mid-1943. When negotiating with Moscow-sponsored Czechoslovak Communists Beneš advocated return to Czechoslovakism as to a state doctrine, though KSČ at that time was already highly sceptical about viability of the concept. Also the National Slovak Council (SNR), underground body formed in Slovakia, styled as continuation of the pre-1939 autonomous Slovak assembly, politically heterogeneous though strongly left-leaning and declaring loyalty to president Benes, adopted a different position. The body, formally the supreme political organisation leading the Slovak National Uprising, in its September 1944 pronouncement spoke in favour of Czechoslovakia as the state of two nations, the Czechs and the Slovaks.

== Czechoslovakism under socialism ==
Czechoslovak coat of arms (1960–1990)

The Czechoslovak state re-constructed in 1945-1948 abandoned the notion of a common Czechoslovak nation. The 1948 constitution referred to "we, the Czechoslovak people", the 1960 constitution read "we, the working-class people of Czechoslovakia", and the 1968 constitution opened with "we, the Czech and Slovak nations". There are scholars who consider some of these concepts "a shadow of Czechoslovakism", yet officially Czechoslovakism was denounced as a bourgeoisie doctrine supposed to facilitate penetration of Czech capital into Slovakia. In terms of ideology – e.g. in school textbooks – the emphasis was on class struggle, either of the "Czechoslovak people" or of the Czech and Slovak nations. Most key cultural institutions like central art gallery, theatre, museum or philharmonic orchestra were duplicated, with the Czech ones located in Prague and the Slovak ones in Bratislava. The flagship newspaper of the Communist party was issued as Rudé právo in Czech and as Pravda in Slovak.

Though there was no mention of autonomy, in 1948 Slovakia was granted its own legislative and executive bodies; no such bodies were introduced for Bohemia or Moravia. The new constitution of 1960 did away with local Slovak executive; some of its duties were transferred to the Slovak legislative and some to central state agencies. One more change followed in 1968, when a massive constitutional amendment converted the country into a federation, composed of the parallel and equal Czech Socialist Republic and the Slovak Socialist Republic. In common state bodies Slovakia was over-represented when compared to its share of the population: in the bi-cameral Federal Assembly the lower house was composed of 134 deputies elected in Czechia and 66 deputies elected in Slovakia; the upper house was composed of 75 deputies from each republic. Two republics had own legislative and executive bodies, including the prime minister. Since the mid-1980s another constitutional change was considered; it would consist of introducing separate constitutions for Czechia and Slovakia, apart from the existing Czechoslovak one. Half-hearted works on such "trilateral" structure proceeded grudgingly and were not completed until the fall of communism in Czechoslovakia.

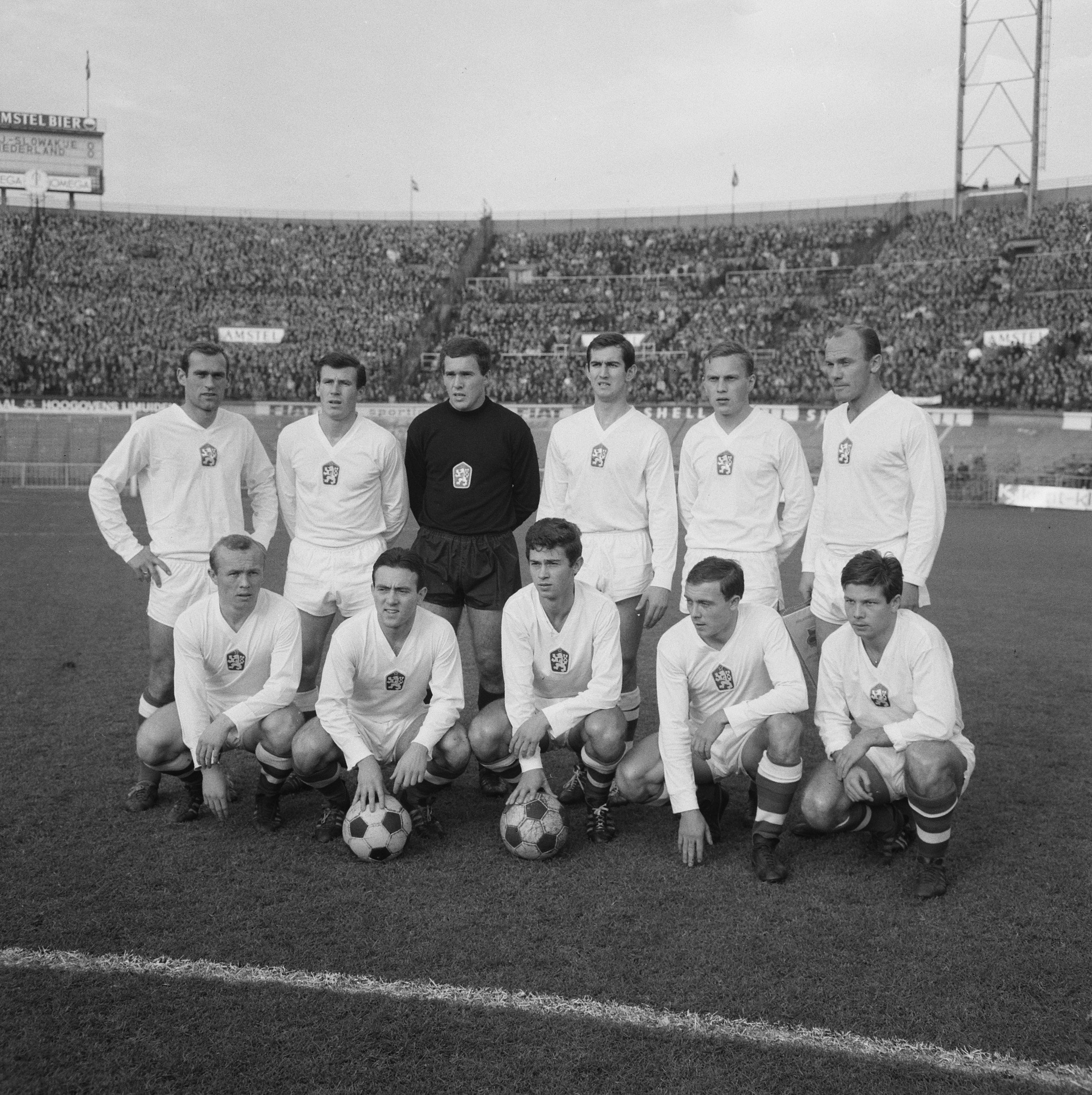
Czechoslovak national football team (1966)

In practical terms all politics was decided by the Communist Party, which since the late 1940s seized all power and turned the country into dictatorship; the party itself was unitary, with no division into a Czech and a Slovak section, in contrast to the Communist Party of the Soviet Union and the League of Communists of Yugoslavia, both of which had republican branches. The first two party leaders, Gottwald and Novotny, were Czechs; the next two, Dubček and Husák, were Slovaks; the last one, Jakeš, was Czech again. The federal prime ministers (the post introduced in 1968) were Czechs: Černík, Štrougal and Adamec. The regime was generally cautious to maintain proportional parity between Czechs and Slovaks where possible. Excess of Czech or Slovak national zeal was usually immediately challenged, though some conflicts were unavoidable. A unique period was this of late 1960s/early 1970s, when many Czechs associated the Husak-led de-liberalization with excessive Slovak influence. In economic terms it seems that Slovakia was even better off than in the interwar period, with state investments especially in heavy industry. As a result, the gap in economic and social development was narrowed; in the late 1980s GDP per capita in Slovakia was 87% of this in Czechia and per capita Slovak consumption was 91% of the Czech one.

== End of Czechoslovakia ==
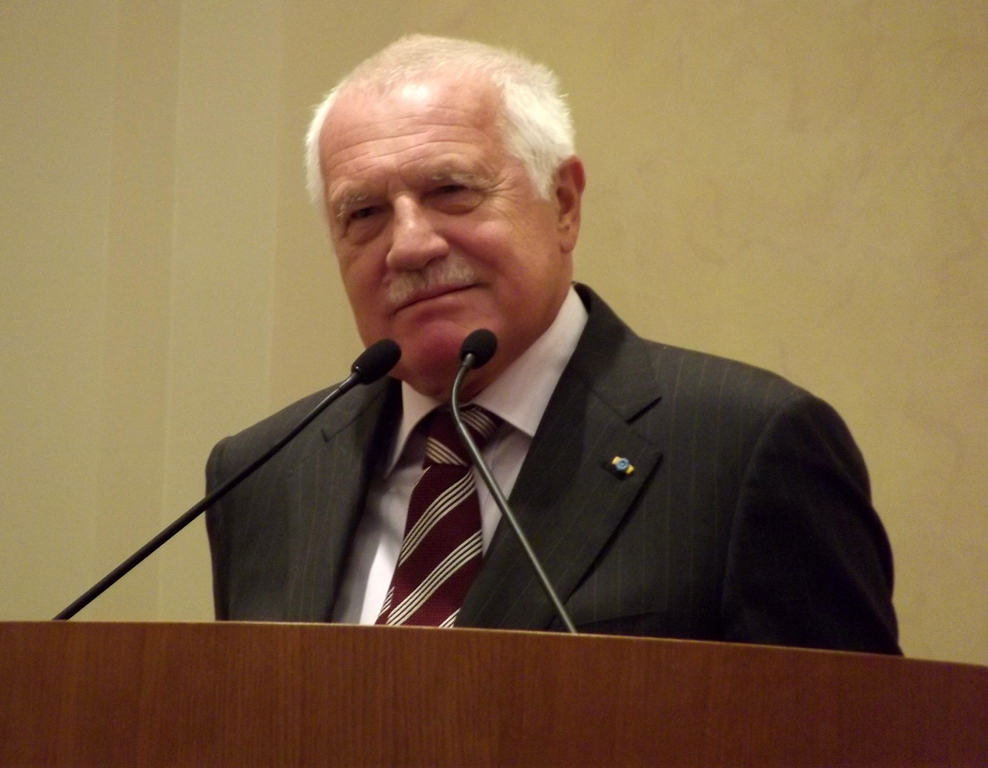
Václav Klaus

After the fall of communism in late-1989 it initially appeared that some sort of federative solution uniting Czechs and Slovaks would be maintained. None of political parties which competed in the 1990 elections advocated break-up, though most agreed that the federative regime had to be re-defined. However, in course of 1990-1992 the initial consensus was getting increasingly fragile; its first sign was a so-called "hyphen war", when parliamentarians debated whether the country should be named "Czechoslovak", "Czecho-Slovak" or "Czech and Slovak" Republic. Though eventually the last of these solutions was adopted as official name in both languages, the episode demonstrated substantial differences between Czechs and Slovaks about the identity of their shared country. Other issues soon followed, e.g. a 1991 debate over control of Federal Broadcasting Council, the body to supervise and regulate the broadcast media. Parliamentary works to define a new federative regime languished. Apart from Czechoslovak parties or parties divided into Czech and Slovak sections, there were new parties emerging which catered exclusively to Czech and especially Slovak electorate. Except the Communists there was no party with comparable support in Czech and Slovak lands, and except Havel and Dubček there were no Czech/Slovak politicians which enjoyed prestige in their non-native republics.

In Slovakia the 1992 elections produced clear but not overwhelming victory of Slovakia-specific parties which advocated a confederative Czechoslovak solution, though they included also a visible independentist current. In June and July leaders of two victorious groupings, Václav Klaus from the Czech Civil Democratic Party (ODS) and Vladimír Mečiar from the Slovak Movement for Democratic Slovakia (HZDS) held talks about forming a common coalition government. The future federative formula turned into the key point of disagreement. Following a few weeks of unsuccessful negotiations, in July the HZDS-dominated Slovak diet unilaterally declared independence, sealed shortly afterwards by decision to dissolve Czechoslovakia, adopted jointly by Klaus and Mečiar. No public consultations like referendum were held. In a series of legal acts, in late 1992 the federal parliament agreed on specific measures and declared Czechoslovakia dissolved as of December 31, 1992.

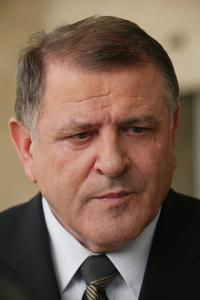
Vladimír Mečiar

Breakup of Czechoslovakia came about though there was no vigorous independence movement on either side; according to opinion polls, only slightly more than one third of both Czechs and Slovaks supported dissolution. However, there was no vigorous movement in defence of the common state either; its key advocate was president Havel, at the time a moral authority rather than a political leader. In general, the dissolution is attributed to Slovak unease about a state union with Czechs, a formula which many of them considered Czech-biased by default; some claim that Slovaks rejected common state as means of advancing Czechoslovakism. Some scholars pointed also to different visions of socio-economic transformation or even suggested that things got out of hand. As there were no serious points of disagreement, e.g. in terms of mutually coveted territory or national minorities, negotiating a divorce was fairly easy. Factors which prompted Czechs and Slovaks to build a common state in 1918 did not exist any more. There was no real threat of German or Hungarian revisionism in the early 1990s; there was virtually no German minority in Czechia, while in Slovakia the ratio of Slovaks to Hungarians went up from 3:1 in 1918 to 8:1 in 1991.

== Today ==
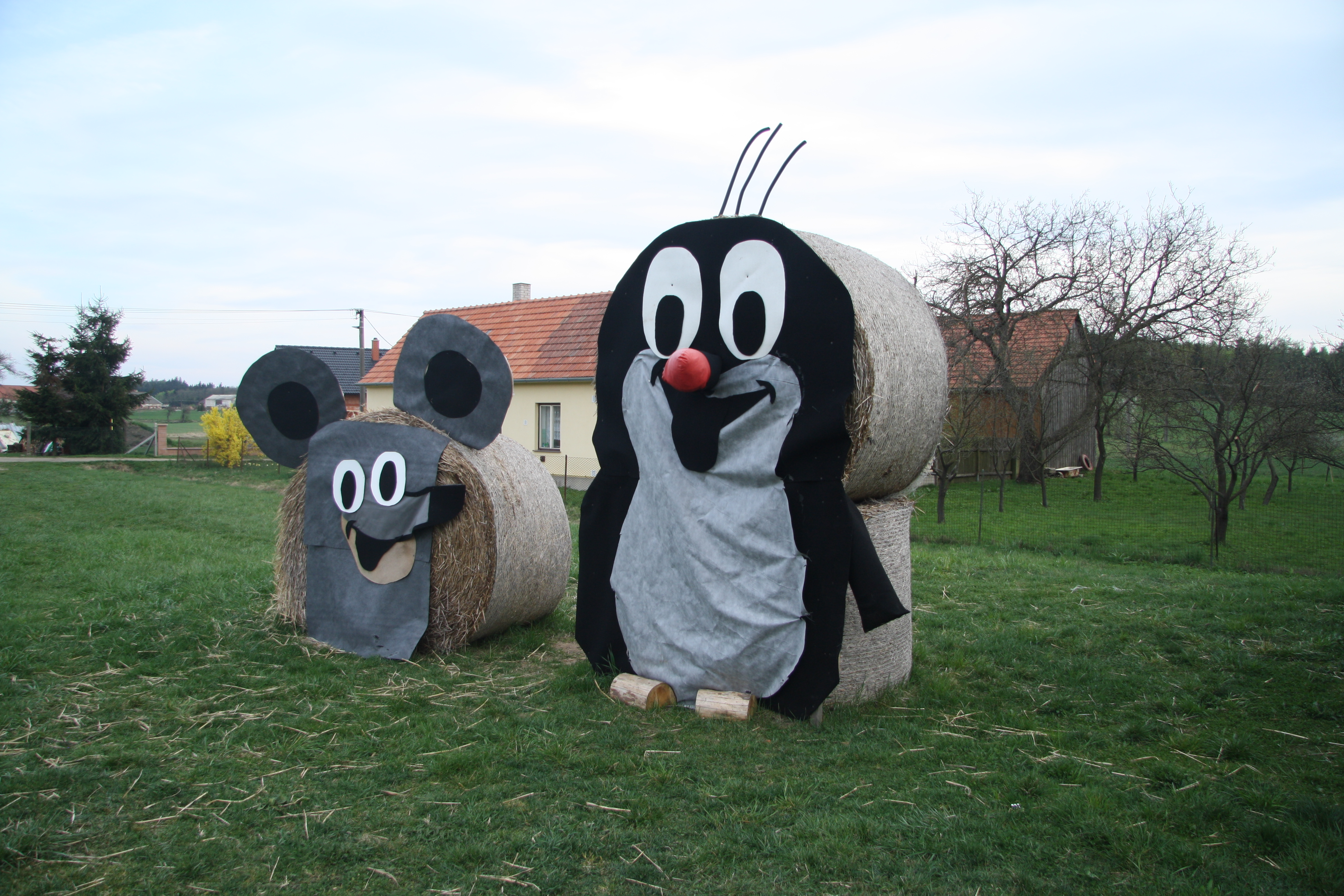
Krtek, present-day reference

After the break-up of Czechoslovakia both Czechs and Slovaks focused on their own nation-state projects. In case of Mečiar-led Slovaks it was not infrequently dubbed nationalist populism or ultra-nationalism; in case of Czechs some scholars confronted the post-Czechoslovak "Little Czech" identity with the earlier "Great Czech" identity. Czechoslovakism went into almost total oblivion, and if mentioned it was referred to with scepticism or hostility, by Czechs as a failed concept and by Slovaks as disguised Czech expansionism. No serious political force in Czech or Slovak state advanced either a vision of a common Czechoslovak nation or this of a common Czechoslovakia, be it as unitary state, federation, confederation or otherwise. The most visible project until today has been "Czechoslovakia 2018", more of a social media initiative rather than an organised political group. It aims to re-unite both countries by triggering referendums, though it clearly notes the existence of two separate nations. The initiative produced no result so far; signatures needed are being collected, but it is not clear whether there is any chance to meet the threshold required by law, especially high in case of Slovakia.

Both Czech and Slovak states officially and somewhat proudly embrace the Czechoslovak heritage as part of their common history; in October 2018 there were celebrations of the 100th anniversary of the foundation of Czechoslovakia in Prague and Bratislava, and respective governmental agencies of both states joined forces in common enterprises like a grand Czech-Slovak Exhibition, organised by national museums. However, the Slovak 2018 celebrations focused on October 30, the day of the Martin declaration, while the Czech ones focused on October 28, the day the Czechoslovak National Council declared Czechoslovak independence. Moreover, October 28 is traditionally a major holiday for the Czechs, while Slovak public holidays rather commemorate the Slovak constitution, the establishment of Slovak state and the Slovak National Uprising.

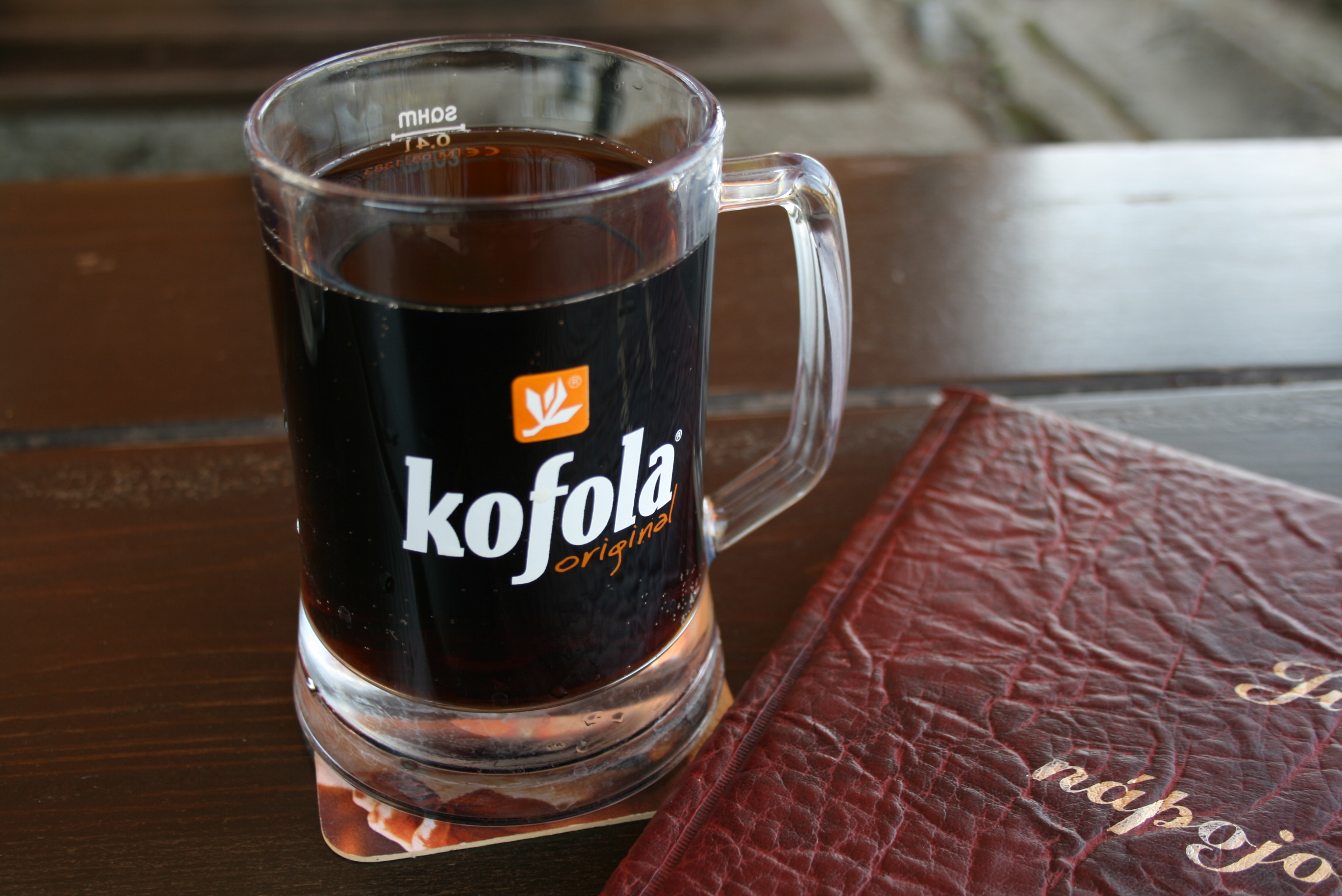
Kofola

The vision of common history as perceived by Czechs and Slovaks in 2018 is visibly, though not strikingly different; in opinion polls both nations quote somewhat different sets of most and least preferred personalities or episodes. Opinion polls as to the break-up of Czechoslovakia are inconclusive. In the late 2010s a slight majority of both Czechs and Slovaks approved of emergence of their own nation states, though only some 40% positively evaluated the break-up of Czechoslovakia; it seems that a slightly higher percentage of Slovaks than Czechs view the common past favourably. In 2018 Slovakia was the 4th Czech trading partner (6.3%), while the Czech Republic was the Slovak 2nd partner (11.5%). There is an increasing number of Slovaks migrating to Czechia; currently it stands at around 215,000, which in percentage terms is more than in the interwar period and less than in the Communist Czechoslovakia. In terms of general sentiment both nations seem fairly close. In ratings of most-liked nations the Slovaks top the list among the Czechs and the Czechs among the Slovaks; in case they do not compete against each other, national sport teams (typically ice hockey) are mutually supported by Czechs and Slovaks. For many mid-age and older people a sentiment towards times of youth extends to Czechoslovakia-made icons like Krtek or kofola.

== Historiographic assessment ==
In scholarly historiographic discourse Czechoslovakism is defined as a concept of either a common Czechoslovak nation or a common Czechoslovak state. The former definition clearly prevails yet its exact content might vary, as relations between the Czechs and the Slovaks in the common nation could have been defined differently. The classic model of theoretical Czechoslovakism as reconstructed by historians envisions one nation composed of two equal components, the Czechs and the Slovaks. However, the term Czechoslovakism could be applied also to somewhat different models of Czech and Slovak national unity. One was based on theory of the Slovaks simply as Czechs living in (former) Upper Hungary; another envisioned Slovaks as branch of a Czech "tribe" or Czech "peoples", the term somewhat broader than "a nation"; one more saw the Slovaks as Slavic ethnic group akin to Czechs yet to gain national identity, sort of "Czechs in-the-making"; finally, some acknowledged separate ethnic/cultural status of Czechs and Slovaks and viewed the Czechoslovak nation as one political community. This last model is already close to a concept which acknowledges existence of two separate Czech and Slovak nations, united by common political interest and supporting a common, Czechoslovak state.

There are different mechanisms considered responsible first for the rise and then for the fall of Czechoslovakism. Among the former scholars usually quote linguistic proximity (which in the early 19th century almost resulted in buildup of a common language), lack of ethnic and political conflicts between Czech-speakers and Slovak-speakers, and common political interest related to post-1918 ethnic setup. According to the last reading, Czechoslovakism was more of a negative defensive political strategy rather than a positive national ideology; it reportedly emerged as combined measure of Czech self-defense against the Germans and Slovak self-defense against the Hungarians. Among mechanisms listed as leading to demise of Czechoslovakism one might find: allegedly innate Czech-bias of the concept, which gradually alienated the Slovaks; cultural differences between secular, mostly urban Czechs and Catholic, mostly rural Slovaks; lack of key common positive narrative; genuine and popular yet ultimately incompatible Czech and Slovak visions of community; international factors, which in the mid-20th century delivered an impulse against Czechoslovakism, and which in the late 20th century failed to deliver an impulse to support it. When assessing the balance between centrifugal and centripetal factors most scholars are very cautious when offering a verdict whether Czechoslovakism was doomed to fail or whether it stood a chance of success.

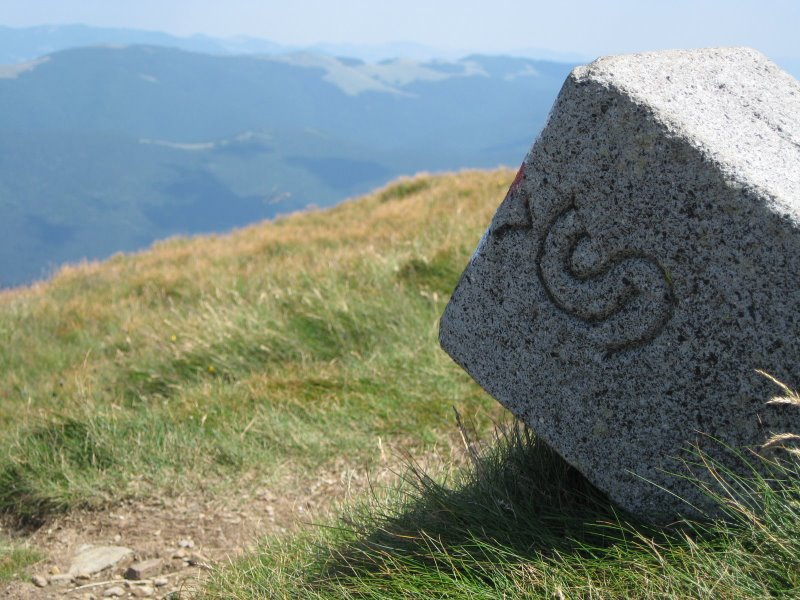

== See also ==
- History of Czechoslovak nationality
- First Czechoslovak Republic
- Second Czechoslovak Republic
- Third Czechoslovak Republic
- Czechoslovak Socialist Republic
- Czech and Slovak Federative Republic
- Czech people
- Slovak people
