= Heister =

Heister is a German surname. Notable people with the surname include:

- Beate Heister (born 1951), German billionaire
- Chris Heister (born 1950), Swedish politician
- Danny Heister (born 1971), Dutch table tennis player
- Leopold Philip de Heister (1716-1777), German general
- Lorenz Heister (1683–1758), German anatomist, surgeon and botanist
- Marcel Heister (born 1992), German footballer
- Stephen Heister, American aerospace engineer
