= Slovjak movement =

Cultural and political movement in 19th and 20th centuries

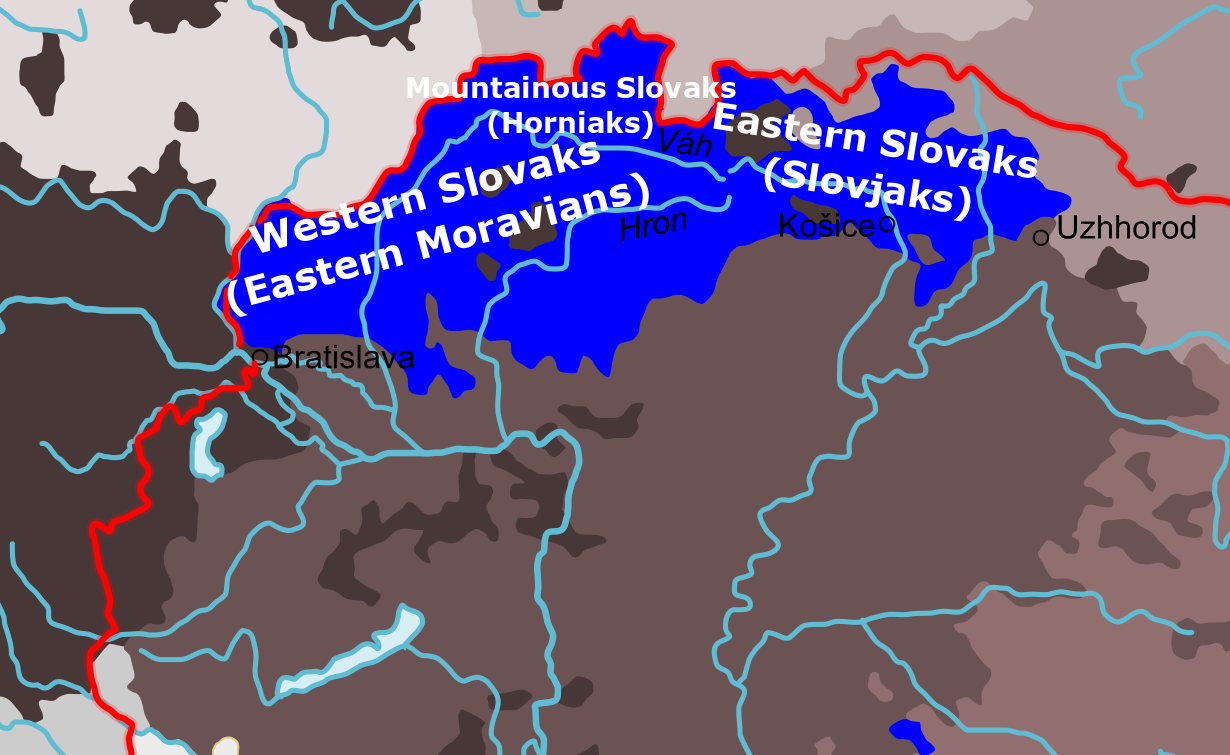
Slovak dialects in the Kingdom of Hungary

The Slovjak movement was a cultural and political movement in the 19th and 20th centuries supporting the Slovjak culture's recognition as different from the Slovaks'. The Slovjak (also known as Eastern Slovak) people lived in today's Prešov and Košice regions and Zakarpattia Oblast in the 19th and 20th centuries. Their language or dialect is now considered archaic by modern linguists.

== History ==
=== Rise and golden age ===
The first literary work to be written in Slovjak was published in 1844.

In the 1860s, József Répánszky, pastor of Enyicke (Haniska) was the first who proposed the use of Slovjak in the local education. Répánszky requested the Ministry of Religion and the Ministry of Education to publish school books in the local dialect because students didn't understand the literary Slovak language. In the next decade, the use of Slovjak in the regional education and in the Roman Catholic and Evangelical churches became standard.

Slovak nationalists heavily opposed the support of the government from the beginning. Pastor Jonáš Záborský was the first to speak against the new movement. He called it dangerous for the Slovak people and accused the Hungarians of trying to "cut them to a hundred pieces". However, the following decades represented the golden age of the language. Many Slovjak books were published in Upper Hungary and the USA, and an independent newspaper titled Naša Zastava ("Our Flag") was published in 1907, edited by István Dessewffy.

Gejza Zsebránczky, one of the Eastern Slovjak thinkers, deemed the literary Slovak works—even catechisms—dangerous for the national consciousness of the local people. He stated that they should have writings in their own language and should be able to write as they speak. Similar views were held by another man, Š. Lessko, who stated "we don't need Slovak grammar, every man in Šariš is the grammar himself". He professed in the newspaper Eperjesi Lapok "the main aspiration of my whole life was neglection of grammar in the Šariš dialect and the sustainance of the clean Šariš dialect".

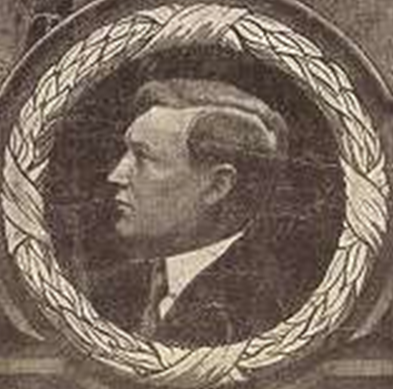
Viktor Dvorčák

=== Attempts to save ===
In interwar Czechoslovakia, the use of Slovjak language declined. Due to being denied the slightest autonomy, most of their intellectuals (many being of Hungarian descent) were at this time Hungarophiles. Their leader, Viktor Dvorčák founded the Eastern Slovak National Council at Prešov (Eperjes) in 1918, which demanded independence for the Slovjak-speaking territory. On 11 December, he proclaimed the Eastern Slovak Republic at Košice (Kassa) with the capital of Prešov, to be a cultural autonomy in Hungary with an independent council. Dvorčák sent a memorandum to Oszkár Jászi, Hungarian Minister for National Minorities, explaining that the Slovjaks are ethnically, linguistically, culturally and geographically differing from Slovaks. He requested Hungary to recognize the new state, not intervene in its land reform, let the majority of local schools be under their jurisdiction and ensure the rights of all minorities. He also asked for the creation of a Slovak section in the ministry and the arrangement him to be represent of the Slovak nation. The Hungarian National Council didn't accept the memorandum with the reason that this matter cannot be discussed until the upcoming peace conference consents.

The Czech leadership found Dvorčák's ideas outrageous, and Karel Kramář blamed the Hungarians for starting the movement. Karol Bulissa, charge d'affaires of the Slovjak movement in Budapest tried to prove this was untrue, and even sent telegraph to Woodrow Wilson through Fernand Vix, though in America, he didn't find support. As the Czechoslovaks approached Košice, the Slovak People's Republic began forming the so-called Slovak National Guard to defend the city. This was cut short by the quick arrival of the Czechoslovak army, which is why Dvorčák decided to take the train to Budapest as his people's republic disintegrated. Many of his associates followed him, many retired and many adopted the views of Czechoslovakism. After the communist takeover, he fled to Poland and criticized the establishment of the Slovak Soviet Republic. After the restoration of order, he moved back to Budapest. Publishing under the name Dvortsák Győző, (Note: Győző is the Magyarized form of the name Victor (Slovak: Viktor)) he wrote papers supporting Hungarian revision.

During the partition of Czechoslovakia, he was tasked by the Hungarian government to reignite the Slovjak movement by smuggling flyers through the border with the help of secret service. In 1939, the Naša Zastava was published again from Hungarian funds, becoming self-sufficient after the partition of Czechoslovakia in 1940. Despite that, the First Slovak Republic continued to ban it. In 1941, Dvorčák founded the Ojčizma ("paternal legacy"), which published Slovjak dictionaries and textbooks. The association was accused by Czechoslovak newspapers of serving Polish interests and planning to connect Poland with Hungary by land through Eastern Slovakia. Hungarian support, however started to shrink. Led by the Slovjak cause, Alfréd Mertens, representative of the United Hungarian Party (Hungarian minority party) in Michalovce, contacted to Lajos Kuhl, Hungarian ambassador in Bratislava, telling him that if the support would stop, the Slovjaks would be forcefully assimilated. Kuhl denied that the Hungarian government turned away from the movement, only intended to move its center from Hungary to Slovakia, proving that it doesn't depend on foreign help. He also suggested that Dvorčák should withdraw from public life, viewing his personality not sympathetic to the people. This didn't happen.

Replying to the letter of Prime Minister Pál Teleki asking his opinion about the Slovjak question, Bishop of Košice István Madarász said that Slovjak is not a language but a foolish dialect and supporting it only raises linguistic tensions. Ferenc Kászonyi thought that the two had enough strong differences for Slovjak to be considered a separate language, as a monolingual person speaking either cannot understand a sentence from the other, only some words here and there. Sándor Vájlok also commented on the debate, noticing the big differences between Eastern and Western Slovaks not just in language but also in mentality, as the Slovaks are much more self-conscious and nationalistic, while the Slovjak youth is not anymore professing to be Slovjak.

=== Final decline ===
The impatience and distraction of the Hungarian leadership to the war effort led to the Slovjak movement losing all foreign support. Viktor Dvorčák died in 1943, and without a good leader to take his place, Budapest chose to cool down the tense Hungarian-Slovak relations and not discuss the question anymore. Naša Zastava was last published in 1944 by Emil Timkó. From this time on, the movement was unable to influence the cultural identity of the Slovaks anymore.

== See also ==
- Language secessionism
