= Horné Lefantovce =

Horné Lefantovce Felsőelefánt
- Municipality
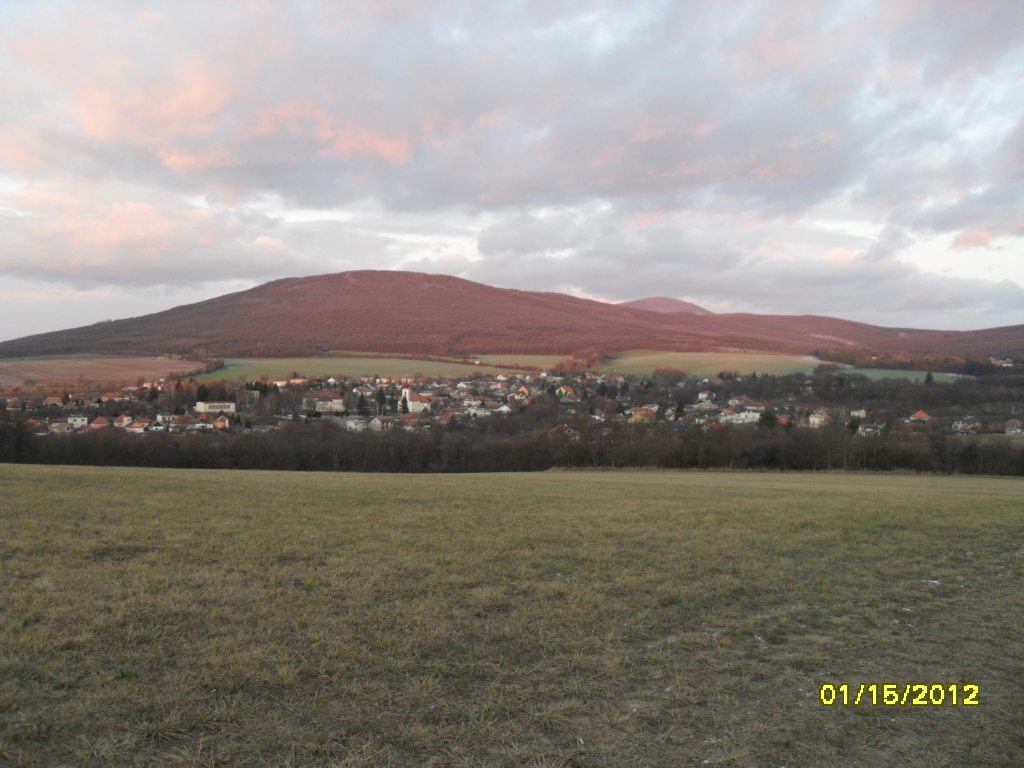

- Flag

- Location of Horné Lefantovce in the Nitra Region Location of Horné Lefantovce in Slovakia
- Coordinates: 48.42°N 18.14°E
- Country: Slovakia
- Region: Nitra Region
- District: Nitra District
- First mentioned: 1113

Government
  - Mayor: Jaroslav Jazvinský

Area
  - Total: 23.21 km^{2} (8.96 sq mi)
- Elevation: 188 m (617 ft)

Population (2025)
  - Total: 839
- Time zone: UTC+1 (CET)
  - Summer (DST): UTC+2 (CEST)
- Postal code: 951 45
- Area code: +421 37
- Vehicle registration plate (until 2022): NR
- Website: www.hornelefantovce.sk

Horné Lefantovce (Hungarian: Felsőelefánt) is a village and municipality in the Nitra District of the Nitra Region, in western Slovakia.

== Geography ==
The municipality lies at an altitude of 188 metres (617 ft) and covers an area of 23.21 km^{2} (8.96 sq mi) (2025).

== History ==
In historical records the village was first mentioned in 1113. It was the ancestral estate of the medieval Elefánthy family, who built a 13th-century castle and a 14th-century monastery in the village.

== Geography ==
The village lies in the centre of a west facing valley, at an altitude of around 190 metres and covers an area of 18.603 km^{2}. A small stream runs through the village, and drains into the Nitra River.

== Population ==
Population statistic (10 years)
Year	1995	2005	2015	2025
Count	1423	950	877	839
Difference		−33.23%	−7.68%	−4.33%

Population statistic
Year	2024	2025
Count	844	839
Difference		−0.59%

It has a population of 839 people (31 December 2025).

=== Ethnicity ===
Census 2021 (1+ %)
Ethnicity	Number	Fraction
Slovak	812	94.3%
Not found out	37	4.29%
Total	861	

In year 2021 was 861 people by ethnicity 812 as Slovak, 37 as Not found out, 8 as Hungarian, 3 as Russian, 3 as Other, 2 as Ukrainian, 2 as Italian, 1 as Czech, 1 as Romanian, 1 as German, 1 as Moravian, 1 as French and 1 as English.

Note on population: The difference values of population numbers in the table "Population statistic" and in the sections "Ethnicity" & "Religion" is caused by the use of various statistical methods.

=== Religion ===
Census 2021 (1+ %)
Religion	Number	Fraction
Roman Catholic Church	645	74.91%
None	134	15.56%
Not found out	39	4.53%
Evangelical Church	13	1.51%
Total	861	

In year 2021 was 861 people by religion 645 from Roman Catholic Church, 134 from None, 39 from Not found out, 13 from Evangelical Church, 6 from Other, 5 from Eastern Orthodox Church, 5 from Other and not ascertained christian church, 4 from Christian Congregations in Slovakia, 2 from Paganism and natural spirituality, 2 from Hinduism, 2 from Greek Catholic Church, 1 from Calvinist Church, 1 from Jehovah's Witnesses, 1 from Islam and 1 from Buddhism.

== Facilities ==
The village has a public library a gym and football pitch.

== See also ==
- List of municipalities and towns in Slovakia

== Genealogical resources ==
The records for genealogical research are available at the state archive "Statny Archiv in Nitra, Slovakia"

- Roman Catholic church records (births/marriages/deaths): 1720-1940 (parish A)
