= Encyclopaedia Beliana =

Slovak encyclopedia

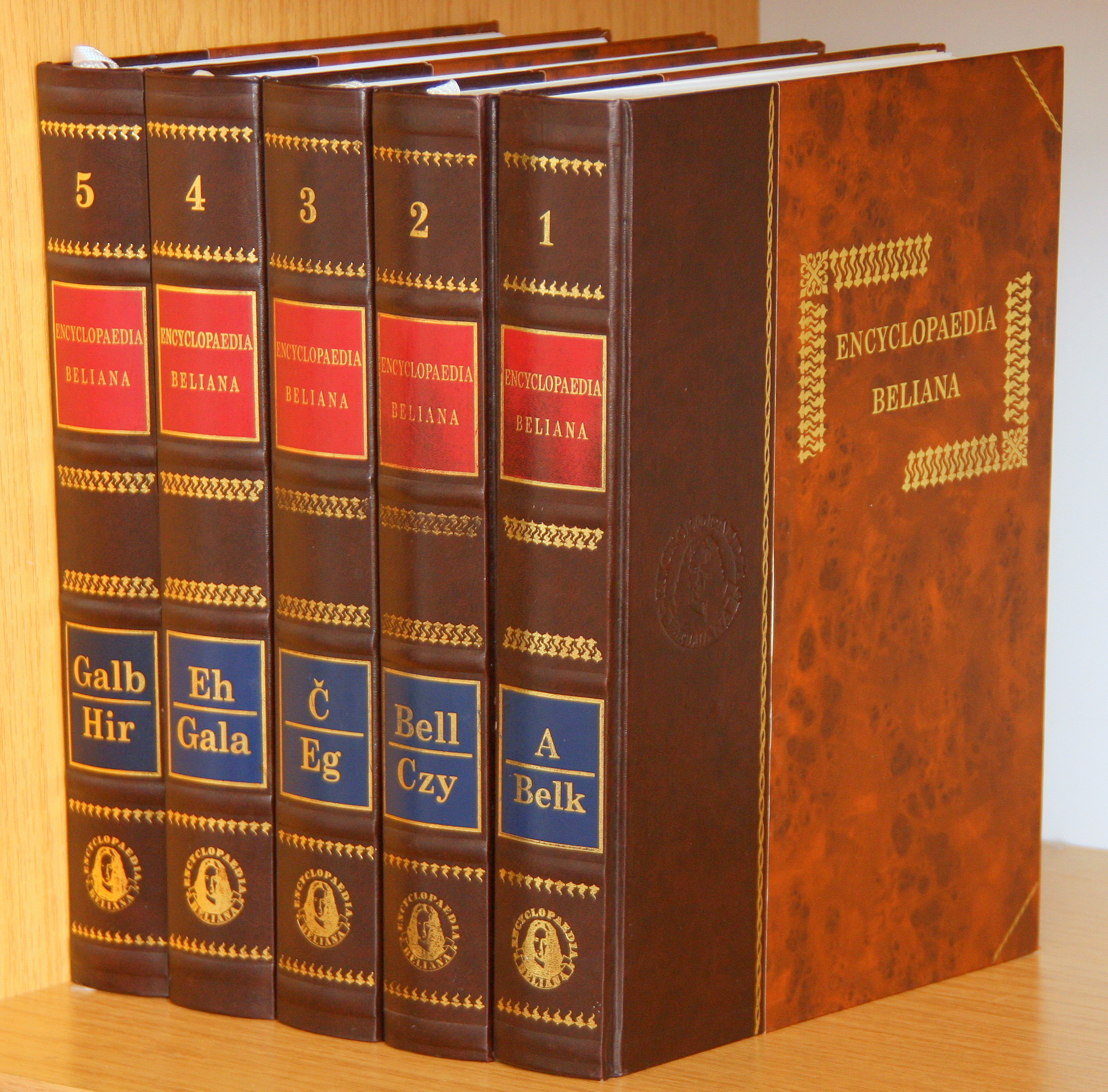
- Encyclopaedia Beliana volumes 1 – 5
- Language: Slovak
- Subject: General
- Genre: Reference encyclopaedia
- Publisher: Slovak Academy of Sciences; Official site
- Publication date: 1999 – present
- Publication place: Slovakia
- Media type: 12+ volumes, hardbound

Encyclopaedia Beliana is a Slovak encyclopedia. When completed, it will contain ca. 150,000 headwords in twelve illustrated volumes, as well as supplements. Beliana is prepared by the Slovak Academy of Sciences. Its name, Beliana, is derived from Matej Bel, 18th century Slovak writer and historian. As of 2024, ten volumes were published.

== Coverage ==
Encyclopaedia Beliana is a universal encyclopedia with its contents divided into three parts: the first on natural sciences, the second on spiritual culture and the third on technology.

== Volumes ==
Volume	Year of publication	ISBN
1. A - Belk	1999	ISBN 80-224-0554-X
2. Bell - Czy	2001	ISBN 80-224-0671-6
3. Č - Eg	2003	ISBN 80-224-0761-5
4. Eh - Gala	2005	ISBN 80-224-0847-6
5. Galb - Hir	2008	ISBN 978-80-224-0982-7
6. His - Im	2010	ISBN 978-80-970350-0-6
7. In - Kalg	2013	ISBN 978-80-970350-1-3
8. Kalh - Kokp	2016	ISBN 978-80-970350-2-0
