= Slovak People's Republic =

Short-lived state in 1918

Eastern Slovak Republic Východoslovenská republika Tót Népköztársaság
- 1918–1918
- Flag
- Status: Unrecognized state
- Capital: Košice
- Common languages: Slovak, Hungarian, German
- Government: Republic
- President
  - 1918: Viktor Dvorcsák
- Historical era: World War I
  - Established: December 11 1918
  - Disestablished: December 29 1918
| Preceded by | Succeeded by |
| First Hungarian Republic | First Czechoslovak Republic |

Slovak People's Republic (Slovak: Slovenská ľudová republika) or the Eastern Slovak Republic (Slovak: Východoslovenská republika) was a short-lived state that lasted from 11 December to 29 December 1918.

The Eastern Slovak National Council was established as an organisation concurrent to the Slovak National Council in November 1918. The council was led by Viktor Dvorcsák, an advocate and ex-archivist from Prešov working for the Hungarian revisionist movement. Before the war, Dvorcsák created a theory about so-called Slovjaks, allegedly an independent nation living in Eastern Slovakia. After the war, he defended the integrity of the historic Hungary, and when he was unsuccessful, he declared that the Slovjaks should exercise the right to self-determination and proclaimed Eastern Slovak People's Republic on 11 December 1918 in Košice. Dvorcsák became the president and tried to orientate his state toward the unity with Hungary. His activities met with the disagreement of several national councils in eastern Slovakia. The state ceased to exist shortly after with the arrival of the Czechoslovak Army. Dvorcsák fled to Budapest, where he worked for Hungarian irredentism and lobbied abroad for the revision.
