= Grammatica Slavico–Bohemica =

Grammatica Slavico–Bohemica (Pressburg, 1746) is an integrated Slovak-Czech grammar published by the Slovak linguist Pavel Doležal. The preface was written by the polyhistor Matthias Bel.

== Dialects depicted ==
Doležal's lingua Slavico-Bohemica is a diasystem of two "dialects" used by two different nations. The Czech language is strictly the language of the Bible of Kralice—the literal language used by Slovak Lutherans. The Slovak language is de facto the urban dialect of educated Slovaks from Skalica (Moravian Valley Western Slovak) with some non-Western Slovak features.

== Impact ==
The work had a significant impact on the further development of Czech and Slovak. It introduced a new grammatical conception, a new classification of verbs and substantives, and influenced the later codification of the modern Czech language (Josef Dobrovský) as well as the codification of the Slovak language (Anton Bernolák).
