= Dolné Lefantovce =

Village and municipality in Slovakia

Dolné Lefantovce Alsóelefánt
- Municipality
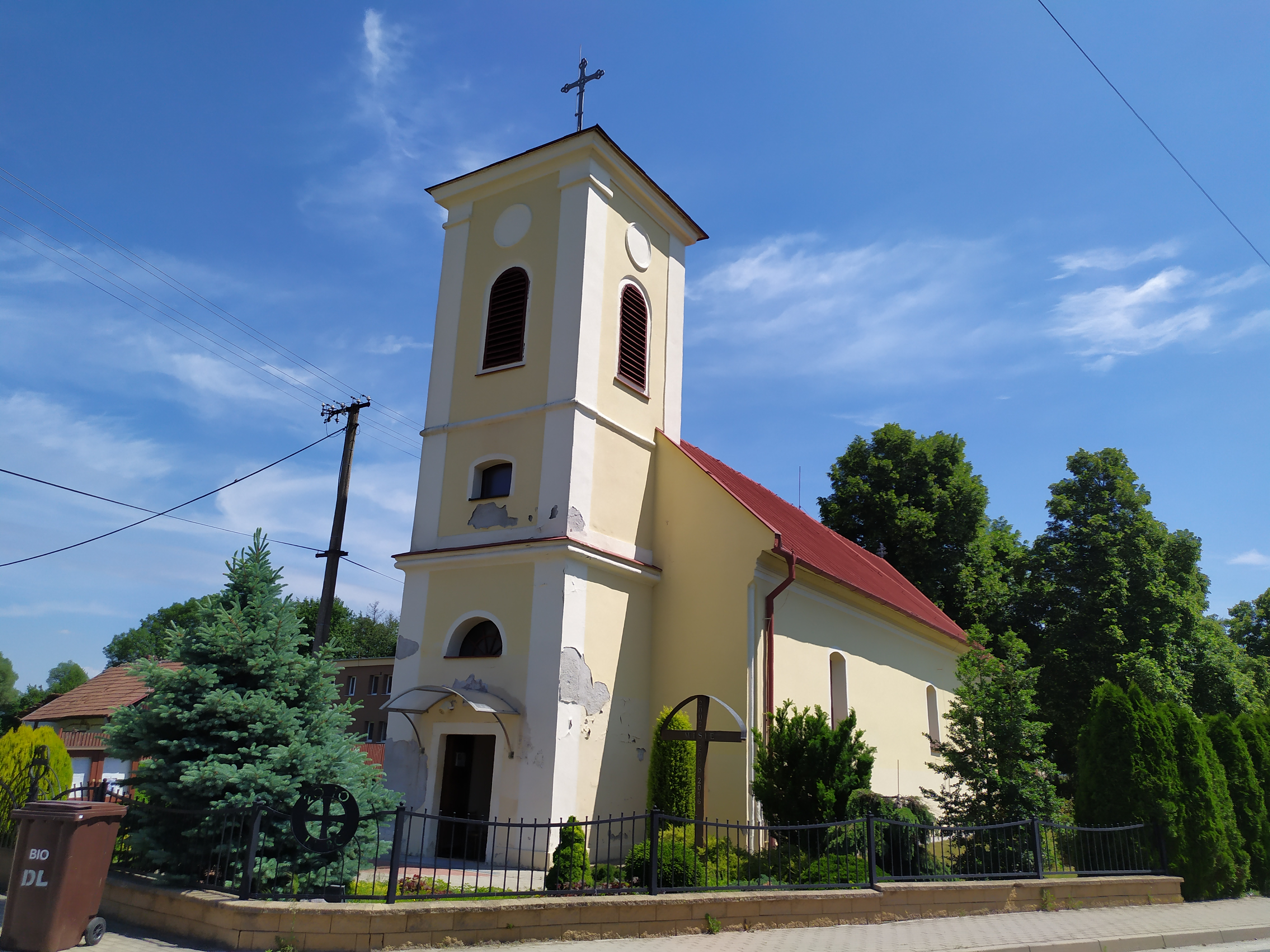
- Church of Nativity of Virgin Mary

- Flag

- Location of Dolné Lefantovce in the Nitra Region Location of Dolné Lefantovce in Slovakia
- Coordinates: 48.42°N 18.12°E
- Country: Slovakia
- Region: Nitra Region
- District: Nitra District

Area
  - Total: 0.00 km^{2} (0 sq mi)
- Elevation: 158 m (518 ft)

Population (2025)
  - Total: 713
- Time zone: UTC+1 (CET)
  - Summer (DST): UTC+2 (CEST)
- Postal code: 951 45
- Area code: +421 37
- Vehicle registration plate (until 2022): NR
- Website: www.dolnelefantovce.sk

Dolné Lefantovce (Hungarian: Alsóelefánt) is a village and municipality in the Nitra District in western central Slovakia, in the Nitra Region.

== Geography ==
The municipality lies at an altitude of 158 metres (518 ft) and covers an area of 0.00 km^{2} (0 sq mi) (2025).

== Population ==
Population statistic (10 years)
Year	1995	2005	2015	2025
Count	0	531	576	713
Difference		–	+8.47%	+23.78%

Population statistic
Year	2024	2025
Count	711	713
Difference		+0.28%

It has a population of 713 people (31 December 2025).

=== Ethnicity ===
Census 2021 (1+ %)
Ethnicity	Number	Fraction
Slovak	662	94.3%
Not found out	40	5.69%
Total	702	

In year 2021 was 702 people by ethnicity 662 as Slovak, 40 as Not found out, 3 as Jewish, 2 as Romani, 2 as Hungarian, 2 as Other, 1 as Czech, 1 as Vietnamese, 1 as Serbian and 1 as German.

Note on population: The difference values of population numbers in the table "Population statistic" and in the sections "Ethnicity" & "Religion" is caused by the use of various statistical methods.

=== Religion ===
Census 2021 (1+ %)
Religion	Number	Fraction
Roman Catholic Church	520	74.07%
None	122	17.38%
Not found out	35	4.99%
Total	702	

In year 2021 was 702 people by religion 520 from Roman Catholic Church, 122 from None, 35 from Not found out, 5 from Other, 5 from Evangelical Church, 3 from Jewish community, 3 from Ad hoc movements, 2 from Christian Congregations in Slovakia, 2 from Greek Catholic Church, 1 from Old Catholic Church, 1 from Calvinist Church, 1 from Paganism and natural spirituality, 1 from Hinduism and 1 from Apostolic Church.

== Facilities ==
The village has a football pitch and a library.

== See also ==
- List of municipalities and towns in Slovakia

== Genealogical resources ==
The records for genealogical research are available at the state archive "Statny Archiv in Nitra, Slovakia"

- Roman Catholic church records (births/marriages/deaths): 1720-1940 (parish B)
