= Stephen Heister =

American aerospace engineer

Stephen Douglas Heister is an American aerospace engineer.

Heister earned his bachelor's and master's degree in aerospace engineering from the University of Michigan in 1981 and 1983, respectively. He then completed a doctorate in the subject at the University of California at Los Angeles in 1988. Heister subsequently held the Raisbeck Engineering Distinguished Professorship for Engineering and Technology Integration at Purdue University.
