= Matthias Bel =

Hungarian pastor and polymath

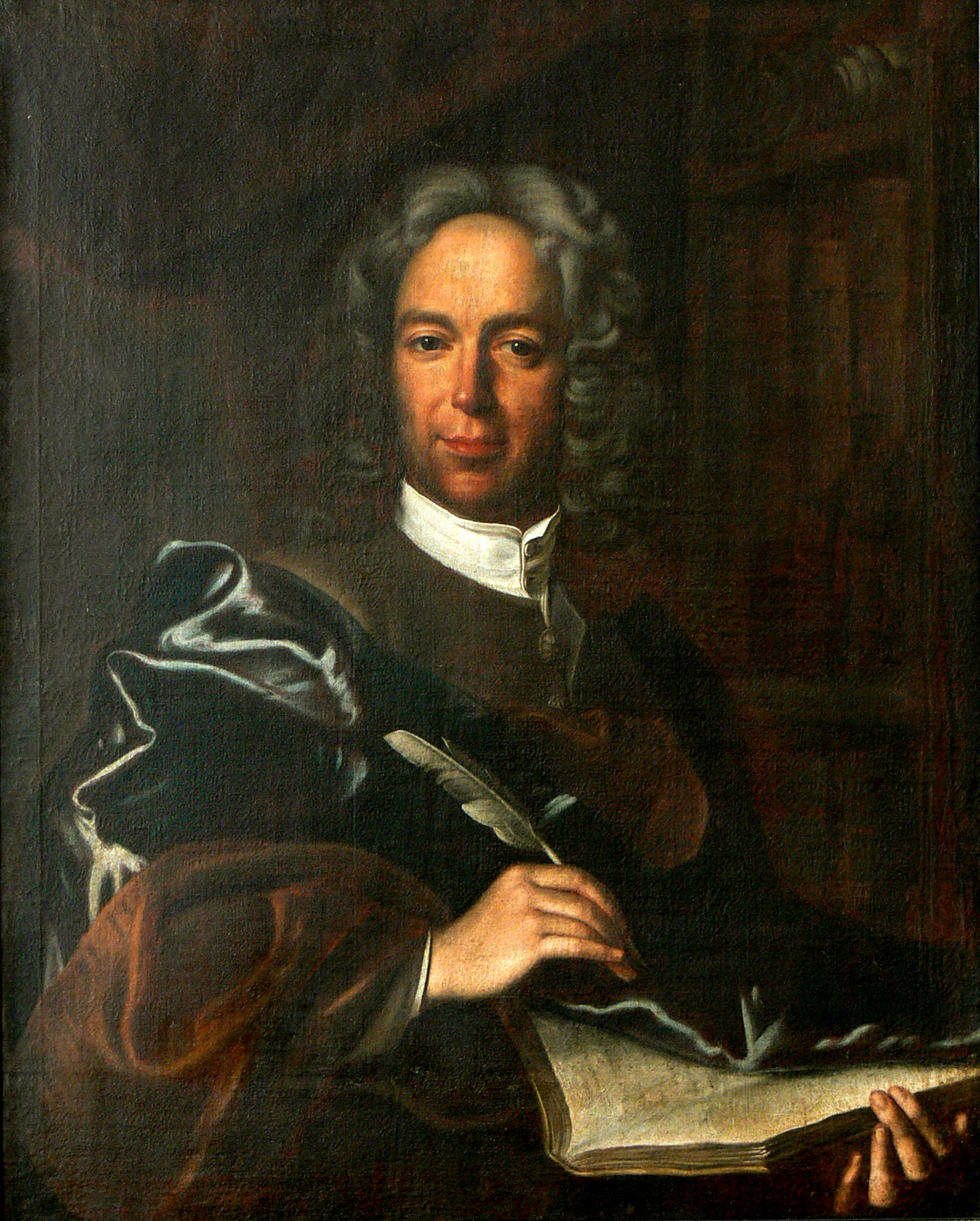
- Matthias Bel
- Born: 22 March 1684; Ocsova, Kingdom of Hungary (now Očová, Slovakia)
- Died: 29 August 1749 (aged 65); Pozsony, Kingdom of Hungary (now Bratislava, Slovakia)
- Citizenship: Hungarian
- Occupations: Lutheran priest, writer, historian, geographer, alchemist
- Spouse: Susanna Hermann

Matthias Bel or Matthias Bél (German: Matthias Bel; Hungarian: Bél Mátyás; Slovak: Matej Bel; Latin: Matthias Belius; 22–24 March(?), (Note: Bel mentioned two, resp. three different dates of his birth (the third indirectly). The date of birth was not recorded to the mid-19th century, but only the date of baptism, which usually took place in a day or two later.) 1684 – 29 August 1749) was a Lutheran pastor and polymath from the Kingdom of Hungary. Bel was active in the fields of pedagogy, philosophy, philology, history, and theoretical theology; he was the founder of Hungarian geographic science and a pioneer of descriptive ethnography and economy. A leading figure in pietism. He is also known as the Great Ornament of Hungary (Magnum decus Hungariae).

== Early life ==
Matthias Bel was born in Ocsova, Kingdom of Hungary (now Očová, Slovakia) to Matthias (Matej) Bel Funtík or Bel-Funtík, a Slovak wealthy peasant and butcher. Little is known about his Hungarian mother Elisabeth born Czesnek (Hungarian: Erzsébet Cseszneky, Slovak: Alžbeta Česneková) except that she was very religious and that she was born in Veszprém. (Note: A hypothesis about her Hungarian or even noble origin (House of Cseszneky) has been prevailing in the Hungarian historiography from the end the 18th century. Tibenský points out that such hypothesis is not substantiated by any contemporary documents. The opinions of Slovak authors are more diverse. According to Jóna, she was maybe (asi) Hungarian and a lower nobleman. Horváth suggests that she was most likely a commoner somewhere from the Nógrád County, from where Slovak students with the name "Czesnek" are also reliably documented. According to Tibenský, it is most likely that she was a local commoner somewhere from the Vígľaš landlordship since Očovians were mostly serfs with no right to move and they close marriages between themselves or with women from the region.)

He described himself as "lingua Slavus, natione Hungarus, eruditione Germanus" ("by language a Slav/Slovak, (Note: The Latin term Slavus is polysemantic and can be translated as a Slovak or as a Slav depending on the context. The quote is from Doležal's Grammatica Slavico-Bohemica - an integrated Slovak-Czech Grammar in which the cultural Slovak language (cultiorum Slavorum in Hungaria) is compared to Czech (dialectum Bohemorum).) by nation a Hungarian, by erudition a German"). In 1710, he married an ethnic German woman from Hungary, Susanna Hermann, and the couple had eight children together.

Bel attended schools in Losonc (now Lučenec), Kálnó (today Kalinovo) and Alsósztregova (today Dolná Strehová), and then grammar schools in Besztercebánya (today Banská Bystrica), Pressburg (Pozsony, today Bratislava), and briefly in Veszprém and in the Calvinist college of Pápa. Between 1704 and 1706, he studied theology, philosophy, and medicine at the University of Halle and he was appointed rector at the school of Klosterbergen near Magdeburg after that. Later, returning to the Kingdom of Hungary, became an assistant rector and became afterwards the rector at the Lutheran grammar school in Besztercebánya (Banská Bystrica), where he was also simultaneously a pastor. As a Rákóczi-sympathisant, he was almost executed by General Sigbert Heister. Between 1714 and 1719, he was the rector of the Lutheran grammar school and then also a pastor of the German Lutheran church in Pressburg. He published his articles in the Latin language newspaper Nova Posoniensia, the first regular periodical in Hungary. (Note: Bel is sometimes incorrectly mentioned an editor or even a publisher of the newspaper. The newspaper was published by Jean Paul Royer, the editors were F. W. Beer and M. Marth.) In 1735 Bel drew up a proposal for the creation of a scientific academy, to be based in Pressburg.

Bel spoke Slovak, Hungarian, and German, and his works had been published mostly in Latin, which were steeped in the Hungarian national consciousness as had been manifested for instance in his writing, the Notitia Hungariae novae historico geographica, which is an extolment of the Hungarian history, influenced by his deep affection for the Hungarian language.

Bel died on 29 August 1749. He was buried in Pressburg (Pozsony, today Bratislava, Slovakia), the cemetery has since then disappeared.

== Work ==
=== Religious literature ===
Bel was a translator, editor, publisher and distributor of several religious works. His long-term goal was to publish the Bible in a language intelligible to the community he served (that is, Biblical Czech used as a Church and literal language by Slovak Lutherans). In the preface for The New Testament (Halle, 1709), he emphasized that the Bible was already translated, but it is barely available among common people and even among preachers. Bel then participated on the re-edition of Bible of Kralice (Halle, 1722) during which he was responsible especially for the correction of Calvinisms. (Note: Bel's Czech was non-intentionally Slovakized. He also felt that his Czech is not good enough for the translation, so he asked a Slovak linguist Daniel Krman to Bohemize his texts. Regardless of his intention to write in Czech, he introduced Slovakisms also to his Latin-German-Hungarian-Czech dictionary (svokor, žiak, etc).) He also participated on publication of the Hungarian Bible (Leipzig, 1714) and of New Testament (Leipzig, 1717) and was the author of the preface for reprint of Sébastien Castellion's Latin New Testament (Leipzig, 1724 and 1735).

He translated and published several influencing works like The Compendium of Christian Revelation (Johann Anastasius Freylinghausen, Hungarian translation), True Christianity (Johann Arndt, Czech translation supposed mainly for Slovaks), The Garden of Paradise (Johann Arndt, Hungarian and Czech translations).

=== Pedagogy ===
As a teacher Bel wrote books, introduced natural science lessons, and emphasized the importance of using visual aid and experimental education. His methods spread and had a modernizing effect on the education system of the entirety of Hungary.

=== Linguistics ===
As a philologist, Bel was the first to study the Hungarian runes and also contributed to the evolution of the Hungarian literary language. He revised and republished Gáspár Károli's Bible-translation. He wrote Hungarian, Latin and German grammars – in the latter he also reviewed the German communities and dialects in Hungary. His work as a translator and editor in the field of religious work is also copious.

One of his notable writings is the Institutiones linguae Germanicae (Rules of the German grammar) written in Latin for Hungarians, of which special edition was published in Halle in 1730 for Hungarian students studying in Germany. He also wrote a popular book, "Der ungarische Sprachmeister" (Hungarian language master), on Hungarian grammar for Germans. He mistakenly suspected that the Hungarian language was relative of the Hebrew one. In the one work of him whose name is "Literatura Hunno-Scythica" published in 1718, Bél endeavoured to prove that there existed, at one time, a Hun-Scythian alphabet, of which he thought that that must have been known to the Székelys.

In the introduction of Grammatica Slavico–Bohemica by Pavel Doležal, he commends biblical Czech as a language that positively influences cultivation of Slovak

=== History and geography ===
A pioneer of collaborative research in the history of the Kingdom of Hungary, Bel undertook a comprehensive historical and geographic examination of the territory in his well-known Notitia Hungariae Novae Historico Geographiaca. His work about the counties of Hungary was aided by many – while others accused him of espionage. The chancery entrusted Sámuel Mikoviny to supplement his work with detailed maps. The Notitia's complete edition could not be achieved during Bél's lifetime. Only eleven county descriptions were issued in print: Szepes County's description was published in Bél's Notitia project introduction, the Prodromus, the other ten county descriptions – namely Pozsony County, Turóc County, Zólyom County, Liptó County, Pest-Pilis-Solt-Kiskun County, Nógrád County, Bars County, Nyitra County, Hont County, Moson County – were published in five volumes of the Notitia. The remaining 37 county descriptions along with the Jász-Kun districts' description were left in manuscripts due to the revising county authorities' negligence or hostility, and the problems with the printery. These manuscripts have been scattered to several archives or collections. In his works, he notes greatness of the Slavic people, also mentioning many positive characteristics of Slovaks, as well as their autochthony in the Kingdom of Hungary.

== Honours and awards ==
Bel's works met with recognition and respect beyond the Kingdom: he was a member of a number of learned societies abroad (e.g., Prussian Royal Academy (Berlin), Royal Society of London, Societas eruditorum incognitorum in terris Austriacis (Olomouc), Jena, Saint Petersburg). He was elevated to noble rank by Charles VI of Austria, and received a golden medallion with his (Bel's) own portrait from Pope Clement XII.

== Legacy ==
Recently Hungarian historians and philologists began to publish a critical edition of the county descriptions remained in manuscripts, based on the results of a comprehensive research made by the Hungarian historian Gergely Tóth. Calculating the length of the descriptions, they find it achievable to publish all the descriptions left in manuscript in 10 volumes. The first volume, which contains the descriptions of Árva and Trencsén counties, has already been published.

Matej Bel University (Univerzita Mateja Bela) in Banská Bystrica is named after him, as well as elementary schools in Očová (Základná škola s materskou školou Mateja Bela Funtíka) and in Šamorín (Základná škola Mateja Bela). Encyclopaedia Beliana is also named in his honor.

== Publications ==
- Forma sacrorum verborum (Halle, 1707)
- Compendium (1713)
- Invitatio ad symbola conferenda dum historia linguae hungaricae libri II...edere parat... (Berolini, 1713)
- Grammatica Latina (Leutschoviae, 1717)
- Rhetorices veteris et novae praecepta (Lipsiae, 1717)
- Institutiones linguac germanicae et slavicae in Hungaria ortu (Leutschoviae, 1718)
- De vetera literatura hunnoscythica exercitatio (Lipsiae, 1718)
- Christophori Cellarii latinitatis probatae et exercitae liber memorialis naturali ordine dispositus (Norimbergae, 1719)
- Flos medicinae scholae Salernitanae (Posonii, 1721)
- Hungariae antiquae et novae prodromus (Norinbergae, 1723)
- Preces christianae (Lipsiae, 1728)
- Die Gatt suchende Seele (1729)
- Der ungarische Sprachmeister. (Pressburg, 1729)
- Adparatus ad historiam Hungariae. Decades II. (Posonii, 1735–46)
- Notitia Hungariae novae historico-geographica. Partis I. Tom. I–IV. Partis II. Tom. V. Viennae, (1735–42)
- Compendium Hungariae geographicum (Posonii, 1753)
- Kurze und zuverlässige Nachricht von dem Zustande der protestantischen Kirche in Ungarn
- Compendiolum regnorum Slavoniae, Croatiae, Dalmatiae, Gallicae et Lodomeriae. Posonii et Cassoviae (1777)
- Miscellanea Berolinensia (1734)

== Bibliography ==
- Tibenský, Ján (1984). Matej Bel, život a dielo (in Slovak). Bratislava: Osvetový ústav.
- Horváth, Pavol (1987). "Pôvod Mateja Bela". In Tibenský, Ján (ed.). Matej Bel. Doba život dielo (in Slovak). Bratislava: Veda vydavateľstvo Slovenskej akadémie vied.
- Kollárová, Ivona (2003). "Matej Bel - vydavateľ náboženskej literatúry". Historický časopis (in Slovak) (2). Bratislava: Slovak Accadeic Press. ISSN 0018-2575.
