= Reca =

Reca Réte
- Municipality
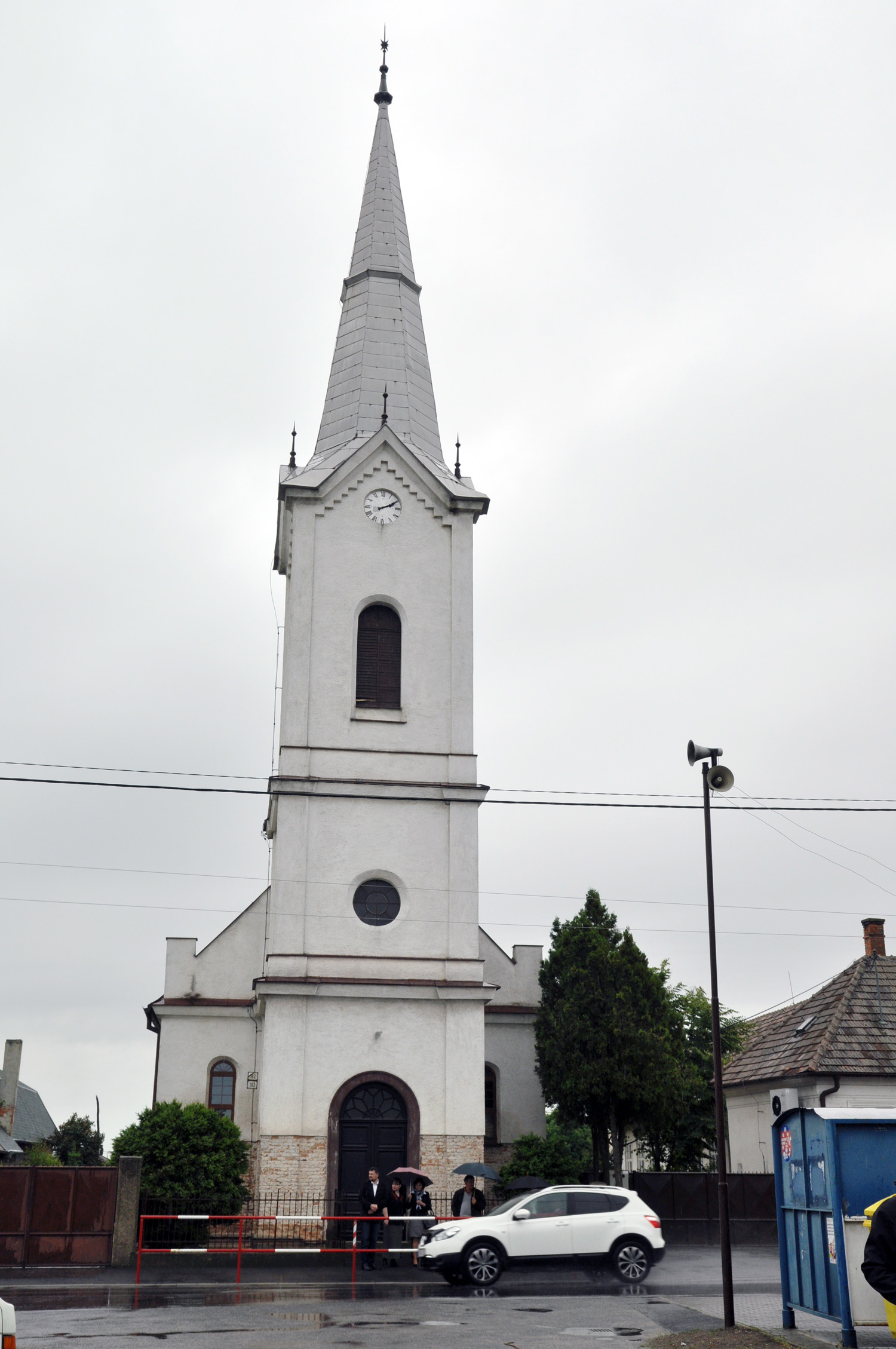
- Reformed church in Reca

- Flag

- Location of Reca in the Bratislava Region Location of Reca in Slovakia
- Coordinates: 48.23°N 17.45°E
- Country: Slovakia
- Region: Bratislava Region
- District: Senec District
- First mentioned: 1256

Government
  - Mayor: Zoltán Metzner (SMK-MKP)

Area
  - Total: 17.66 km^{2} (6.82 sq mi)
- Elevation: 124 m (407 ft)

Population (2025)
  - Total: 1,727
- Time zone: UTC+1 (CET)
  - Summer (DST): UTC+2 (CEST)
- Postal code: 925 26
- Area code: +421 10
- Vehicle registration plate (until 2022): SC
- Website: www.obec-reca.sk

Reca (Hungarian: Réte; German: Entenberg) is a village and municipality in western Slovakia in Senec District in the Bratislava Region.

== Geography ==
The municipality lies at an altitude of 124 metres (407 ft) and covers an area of 17.66 km^{2} (6.82 sq mi) (2025).

== History ==
Pagan tomb-mounds excavated in an around Reca confirm the presence of Magyar mounted border guards from the 10th century.

In historical records the village was first mentioned in 1256, and was part of the dominion of Matthias Csák, the magnate of Trencsén. Documents confirm that before Csak, during the reign of the early Árpád kings, the settlement was inhabited by castle warriors (jobagiones castri) and controlled by the Count of Pozsony. The castle warriors of Reca developed into landowning lower nobility and Reca was a characteristic curial village of Pozsony County until the mid-20th century.

During the Counter-Reformation in the 16th and 17th centuries, Reca (or Réthe, as it was then known) became the shelter of Bohemian and Moravian Protestants after the Battle of the White Mountain, because the Reca gentry was not subject to Catholic Habsburg religious laws. An estimated five-sixths of the Bohemian nobility went into exile soon after the Battle of White Mountain, and their properties were confiscated. This period has left a Unity of the Brethren Chapel in the village, containing pieces of rare ecclesiastical plate. After the city of Skalica, Reca was one of the most significant locations in Royal Hungary for Czech exiles, with approximately 30 families settling there in the 17th century.

In 1878 Reca briefly became known as Nemes Réte, in line with some other curial villages (e.g. Nemes Dedina. It also adopted a peculiar coat of arms consisting of the Royal arms of Hungary).

The 1892 Directory of Hungarian Merchants (which covers roughly 10-15% of the working populace of the Hungarian part of Austria-Hungary) lists the heads of families in Reca engaged in trade. It mainly covers Jewish families living in Reca as craftsmen and shopkeepers, and heads of gentry families engaged in horse-breeding which they subsequently sold in nearby Senec, Bratislava or Vienna. The largest families in the list are the Doka (7 [and long-serving representatives of the noble commune of Reca]), Fadgyas (3), Karátsonyi (4), Klebercz (3), Pomichal (6) and Prikkel (3).

During the First Vienna Award in 1938, Reca once more became part of Hungary, during the regime of admiral Miklós Horthy. In 1945 it was recovered by Czechoslovakia. A number of residents were affected by the Benes Decrees and tenthousands of Hungarian families were forced to move to Hungary and Czechia in 1947 as part of the colonisation of Slovaks in the region.

== Notable figures ==
The first individual known to documented history is Petrus Magnus de Réthe, a descendant of the original castle warriors, recorded in 1256 as a castle warrior of Bratislava Castle.

A 1395 document records John and Peter of Reca as having been homini regi (or royal judges) during the reign of Louis I of Hungary (1326-1382).

In 1485, another John of Reca is recorded as judge (iuidex nobilium) of Pozsony County.

Nicholas of Reca was canon and vice-dean, and from 1489 to 1499 dean of the Chapter of Bratislava.

Between 1504 and 1540, Andreas de Réthe was viscount (vice-comes) of Pozsony County (Bratislava).

In the 17th century Péter Réthey was a familiaris (a Hungarian type of vassalage) of the Báthory family, whose members were Kings of Poland and Princes of Transylvania at the time. In 1620 he gained the manor of Füzérradvány from Elisabeth Báthory and her husband Ferenc Nádasdy. Péter Réthey constructed a large fortified seat which today remains one of the largest in Hungary.

A notable 18th-century historical figure of Reca was György Réthey, a former Imperial cavalry officer who fought for Francis II Rákóczi, Prince of Transylvania and leader of the last major uprising of the Hungarian nobility against the Habsburg dynasty (see Rákóczi's War for Independence). Both György Réthey and his brother János defected from Imperial service and commanded hussar regiments under Rákóczi. In 1706, György Réthey led 3,000 men on an infamous attack on Styria, designed to plunder and pillage the local populace. 92 villages, two towns, and several castles were burned during the raid. He also commanded his regiment at the Battle of Trencsén in 1708.

Ferenc Réthey, another eminent supporter of Rákóczi, was, amongst other activities, captain of the medieval Szécsény castle (which was destroyed after the uprising), captain of Sirok castle and, towards the end of his career, captain of Eger fortress and Heves County. On 8 December 1710 Ferenc Réthey and Miklós Perényi capitulated Eger to the Habsburg field-marshal Count Johann Pálffy. It is unclear how closely Ferenc Réthey was related to György Réthey, as prior to the 19th century members of Reca nobility often used only their predicate of "Réthey" or "de Réthe" (meaning 'of Reca') in correspondence and identification, and not their original family names which distinguish individual family lines.

László Dóka was főszolgabíró (Chief Constable) of Pozsony County from 1837 and deputy Judex Curiae Regi (the Lord Chief Justice of Hungary) in the first half of the 19th century, and Sándor Dóka was acting Governor of Pozsony County at the beginning of the 20th.

Marián Réthei Prikkel (1871-1925), a cleric, compiled the first substantial collection of Hungarian folk dances. He also published one of the first monographs on the important early medieval Hungarian manuscript, the Pray Codex.

Ferenc Réthey (1880-1952), a jurist and academic, was Count (Lord Lieutenant) of Moson County.

Richárd Pomichal (1951-2010), was a well-known and popular Hungarian writer, teacher and biologist, who published widely on the ecology of the Csallóköz (Rye Island, Inselschutt) region, as well as writing on Hungarian history and the effects of the Trianon Treaty.

István Pomichal (1965, Reca), an agriculturalist, is a member of parliament and the autonomous Bratislava region for the Party of the Hungarian Coalition, a party for the Hungarian minority in Slovakia Pomichal's pedigree cattle, bred on an estate in Tomášov, has won a number of national and international gold prizes in Slovakia and Hungary.

== Historical descriptions ==
Matthias Bel: The inhabitants are Hungarians, and not rustics: indeed, they are people both of noble birth and character (manners). They bread they eat is excellent and hospitality takes the first place there. They are proud of their ample herds and satisfied with the fruit of their farming.

Vályi, András (1796): Hungarian village in Bratislava Castle County. Lord County Pálffy is the greatest landowner. The inhabitants are Catholics and Protestants, and the village is occupied by a number of nobles. It is half a mile from Puszta Födémes. The burghers of Bratislava send their young children to the village to learn the Hungarian language.

Fényes, Elek (1851): Réthe, a populous Hungarian village in Bratislava Castle County, one hour east of Szencz. 491 Catholics, 49 Evangelical, 337 Reformed, 149 Jews. With a Reformed and Catholic church, and a synagogue. Large limits boundaries and beautiful expanse of fertile meadows, vast pastures, famous for sheep and cattle market. Many landowning nobles. One street leads to Cseklesz.

Liszka, József (2003): The squires of Reca formed an individual group in the Matyusfold region. This social class of the village, which consisted of both Reformed and Catholics, was wealthier than the average. Their wealth was clear because their dwellings looked like manor houses, they employed liveried coachmen and they sent their children to schools in Bratislava from the 19th century. Reca noble families were also distinctive for their behaviour and mentality. "The necessary honourable elegance and a keeping of a certain distance" remained alive even after there was no longer any justification of property, i.e. in the second half of the 20th century.

== Population ==
Population statistic (10 years)
Year	1995	2005	2015	2025
Count	1214	1261	1445	1727
Difference		+3.87%	+14.59%	+19.51%

Population statistic
Year	2024	2025
Count	1729	1727
Difference		−0.11%

It has a population of 1727 people (31 December 2025).

=== Ethnicity ===
Census 2021 (1+%)
Ethnicity	Number	Fraction
Slovak	1139	68.78%
Hungarian	466	28.14%
Not found out	86	5.19%
Romani	20	1.2%
Total	1656	

In year 2021 was 1656 people by ethnicity 1139 as Slovak, 466 as Hungarian, 86 as Not found out, 20 as Romani, 13 as Czech, 7 as Ukrainian, 5 as Romanian, 4 as Other, 3 as Italian, 2 as Rusyn, 2 as Russian, 1 as Serbian, 1 as Moravian and 1 as Greek.

Note on population: The difference values of population numbers in the table "Population statistic" and in the sections "Ethnicity" & "Religion" is caused by the use of various statistical methods.

=== Religion ===
Census 2021 (1+%)
Religion	Number	Fraction
Roman Catholic Church	774	46.74%
None	451	27.23%
Calvinist Church	177	10.69%
Evangelical Church	108	6.52%
Not found out	86	5.19%
Total	1656	

In year 2021 was 1656 people by religion 774 from Roman Catholic Church, 451 from None, 177 from Calvinist Church, 108 from Evangelical Church, 86 from Not found out, 12 from Christian Congregations in Slovakia, 11 from Greek Catholic Church, 6 from Other, 6 from Buddhism, 5 from Apostolic Church, 4 from Other and not ascertained christian church, 4 from United Methodist Church, 4 from Ad hoc movements, 2 from Eastern Orthodox Church, 2 from Jehovah's Witnesses, 1 from Old Catholic Church, 1 from Paganism and natural spirituality, 1 from Islam and 1 from Hinduism.

== References in popular culture ==
Reca is the setting for the epic Hungarian film Rákóczi hadnagya (1954), or "Rákóczi's Lieutenant" in English. The heroic officer in the film, Lieutenant János Bornemissza, is driven by his "patriotism to Hungary and love for the beautiful Anna Bíró from Reca". When Reca falls into labanc hands Anna is imprisoned and only rescued by Bornemissza at the end of the film.
