= Biblical Czech language =

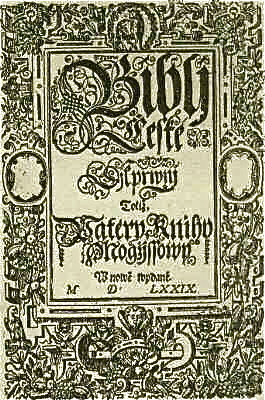
Bible of Kralice

Biblical Czech language is Czech literary language, which established Czech intellectuals by translation of Bible of Kralice. Slovak scholars used as one of their literary languages in the 18th and 19th centuries.

Protestants in Slovakia had already adopted the biblical Czech language in the 16th century. In the 18th century, biblical Czech language, with Slovak elements, became widely used by Slovak poets and writers.

Ján Kollár and Pavel Jozef Šafárik, significant Slovak poets, wrote in the biblical Czech language. They wrote in the biblical Czech language even though the first form of literary Slovak had already appeared.

During the late 18th and mid-19th centuries, there was dispute was about which of the languages would become the dominant and national language of the Slovaks. Catholics used the first form of literary Slovak language, while Protestants used biblical Czech language.

In the 19th and 20th centuries, the biblical Czech language was still used in religious ceremonies by Slovak Protestants.

== Sources ==
- Piaček, Jozef (1999). "Bibličtina". FILIT.
