= History of Czechoslovak nationality =

The history of Czechoslovak nationality involves the rise and fall of national feeling among Czechs and Slovaks. Once forming a rather unified group, they were historically separated, unified under a democratic system, separated during threat of war, and reunified under a socialist authoritarian regime. However, a democratization process has led to a definition of separate statehood for the majority of Czechs and Slovaks.

== History ==
=== Ancient time ===
The Czechs and Slovaks are both ethnic Slavs and speak very similar languages. Moreover, these peoples once formed a very unified group of tribes, which were basically indistinguishable from one another. It is through history and different circumstances, it is believed, that those tribes acquired the characteristics that made them Czechs and Slovaks. As to where exactly the Slav tribes came from, historians cannot agree.

=== Empires ===
==== Great Moravia ====
The earliest instance of formal Czechoslovak unity was under the empire of Samo, whose capital was centered in what is today Bratislava. The Slavonic tribes of Bohemia, Moravia, and Slovakia would continue to be united within the succeeding great Moravian Empire. Prince Mojmír I, founder of the House of Mojmír, established Great Moravia in 833. At the end of the 9th century, it extended further under the rule of Svatopluk I and became the most powerful Slavonic state of Christendom.

However, the tribes living in today's Slovakia were conquered by Magyar (Hungarian) tribes and were separated from the Moravians and Bohemians. In 1025, the territory of present-day Slovakia indeed became a part of the Kingdom of Hungary, thus reducing, but not ending relations between the Czechs and Slovaks. In this period, culture expanded mostly through literature, creating nationalist feelings. Nevertheless, the Czechs and Slovaks were still far from forming a strong united country and the Slovaks remained under Hungarian influence.

==== Habsburg Monarchy ====
In 1526, Bohemia became part of the Habsburg crown, but it was not until the battle of the White Mountain in 1620 that Bohemian independence was liquidated and the native, Czech aristocracy dispossessed. As for Moravia, it also became part of the Habsburg monarchy in 1648. Thus, the Czechs' and Slovaks' lands were divided between Austria and Hungary. This division remained even after the Austro-Hungarian Compromise of 1867, whereby the Dual Monarchy of Austria-Hungary was established.

In their respective Empires, Czechs and Slovaks lived under strongly different conditions. On the one hand, Czechs enjoyed a certain autonomy within Austria. Their culture and language could continue to live and expand, even though Czech remained mainly spoken by the peasantry. Moreover, they were represented in the Austrian Parliament.

In 1862, the Sokol movement was founded in Prague. It played an important part in the Czech national revival and eventually extended to other Slavic countries (such as the Sokół movement in Poland). Educated Czechs called for increased political participation. They wanted to have similar privileges as the Magyars, or Hungarians, and Germans, but were unable to form a united force. Thus, the Czech national movement was mostly suppressed.

On the other hand, Slovaks were living under harsher conditions in the Kingdom of Hungary. Having no political nor economic power, they were dominated by the Hungarians who tried to assimilate them through Magyarisation process as Slovak schools were closed. Under such conditions, the development of a national identity was much more complex and slower.

Having cultural ties with the Czechs, Slovaks were divided between associating with the Czechs or seeking for a separate existence. Moreover, the appeal of joining the Czechs was great since they considered Slovaks as members of their own people and often defended Slovak interests in the Austrian Parliament.

=== First Czechoslovak Republic ===
Czechoslovakism was mainly a product of the First World War. The three founders of the Czechoslovak National Council, Masaryk, Beneš, and Štefánik, met in France, seeking for complete independence rather than only more autonomy in the Habsburg Empire. On 6 January 1918 Czech deputies in the Reichsrat issued the ‘Twelfth Night Declaration’ demanding self-determination for the Czechoslovaks. On October 28, the National Council seized power and Czechoslovakia was created as a parliamentary democracy.

Besides the mutual feelings of unity among Czechs and Slovaks, there were also clear demographic incentives for creating Czechoslovakia. One in three of the population of the Czechs lands was Germans, most of them living in the Sudetenland region. The Czechs could not be confident of defending the new state against a German minority which constituted approximately a third of the population; association with the Slovaks would decrease the minority to just under a quarter and thus make it much more manageable. The Czechoslovak Constitution of 1920 identified the "Czechoslovak nation" as the creator and principal constituent of the Czechoslovak state and established the "Czechoslovak language" as the official language. The concept of Czechoslovakism was necessary in order to justify the establishment of Czechoslovakia towards the world, because otherwise the statistical majority of the Czechs as compared to Germans would be rather weak.

After World War I, the First Czechoslovak Republic was finally formed by combining the Czech lands, Upper Hungary, and Carpathian Ruthenia, which was annexed in 1919 due to the Allies’ pressure. If the desire for a Czechoslovak nation had been expressed for a long time, the Slovaks in the 1920s, nevertheless, felt resentment because they were proportionally less represented into the Czechoslovak administration. This, however, can be explained by the fact that, in Austria-Hungary, the Czechs had the opportunity to develop an elite which could then lead the new country and that such an elite was totally absent in the Slovak population. Moreover, the formation of a Czechoslovak Hussite Church which conducted its services in Czech created large discontent. New national holidays, such as July 6, which commemorated the death of Czech reformer Jan Hus, created opposition within the Catholics. Also during the 1920s, the Slovaks became more and more literate, thus developing their own culture, and the structures promoting such a Slovak culture.

=== 1938–1945: Nazi Regime and World War II ===
The resentment felt by the Slovak population was expressed by the growing support it gave to the Nazi regime and policies. Thus, when Adolf Hitler decided to split Czechoslovakia, Slovaks showed little opposition. The Protectorate of Bohemia and Moravia was created, and Slovak State became a puppet state of Nazi Germany. However, Slovaks soon realized that this clearly meant Nazi domination and control, not real independence. The Slovak National Uprising in 1944 was suppressed by Nazi Germany, but guerrilla warfare continued until the Soviet Army liberated Slovakia in 1945.

=== Soviet-backed regime ===
Following the defeat of the Nazis and the end of the Second World War, Czechoslovakia was restored as a unitary state. After the Czechoslovak coup d'état of 1948, the Slovak independence movement was suppressed and the Communist Party of Slovakia incorporated into the Communist Party of Czechoslovakia. In addition, Slovak communists who favoured a unitary state were installed in power. The most important change in the 1960 Constitution of Czechoslovakia was that it severely limited the autonomy granted to Slovakia. This provision was the decision of President Antonín Novotný. The executive branch of the Slovak government was abolished and its duties assigned to the Presidium of the Slovak National Council, thus combining executive and legislative functions into a single body. The legislative National Assembly was given authority to overrule decisions of the Slovak National Council, and central government agencies took over the administration of the major organs of Slovak local government.

The situation changed under Nikita Khrushchev’s leadership. The new General Secretary had a very different perspective about nationalities and decided to rehabilitate Slovak nationalists. Moreover, the purges and destalinization process of the 1950s caused the revival of Slovak nationalism. On the one hand, many Slovaks had been purged from the Party, and on the other hand, the destalinization process asked for more concessions and compromises. Intellectuals began to have ideas of federalism. The Prague Spring in 1968 was followed by a period of normalization, sometimes called Husakism after Gustáv Husák. Thus, in October 1968, Czechoslovakia amended the 1960 Constitution by the Constitutional Law of Federation. The Slovaks were recognized as a separate nation and were given their own governmental bodies, namely the Slovak national council and the board of commissioners.

=== Velvet Revolution and divorce ===
With the Velvet Revolution of 1989 and the end of the Soviet Union, the historic differences between the Czechs and the Slovaks came back. Those were mainly expressed through different political and economic viewpoints. While Slovaks were more attached and committed to state welfare and ownership, Czechs were wishing for a quick change to the western model of capitalism. Moreover, there were intense debates on renaming the country, with various hyphened versions of Czechoslovakia (this conflict was called the Hyphen War). In addition, the system of checks and balances set up by the constitution made it possible for Slovak autonomists to block political institutions from functioning.

On July 17, 1992, the Slovak National Council adopted Slovakia's declaration of sovereignty, and major constitutional changes gave the Slovaks their own state, which they had desired for a long time. The peaceful dissolution of Czechoslovakia led to the establishment of the Czech Republic and Slovakia.

== National characteristics ==
=== Language ===
Czech and Slovak remain very similar languages. At the time of their formation, Czech and Slovak were actually the same. They both come from Church Slavonic, the original language of Slav tribes and transformed into a literary language by Saints Cyril and Methodius, who brought Christianity to Eastern Europe. However, spoken Czech is today very different from Slavonic, due to the many reforms, notably those of Jan Hus. As for Slovak, it consists of many dialects. Those from the Western part resemble Czech and those from the East are more similar to Slavonic. Differences between the Czech and Slovak languages can also be explained by the Magyarisation of Slovak which occurred mainly in the 19th Century. However, even though Czech and Slovak are different languages, in most cases both Czech and Slovaks can easily understand each other, speaking their own language. Nevertheless, language is an important cornerstone of the Czech and Slovak societies. Thus, knowledge of language is a requirement for the acquisition of citizenship.

=== Religion ===
The Bohemian population was mainly Protestant. Today, however, it is mostly non-religious. The Moravian and Slovak populations are mainly Catholic. However, Czechoslovakia is truly a mosaic of diverse religions.

== Citizenship laws ==
After the Velvet Divorce, laws about citizenship became clearer with the new constitutions. During the Communist Regime, there was not much place for the rule of law. The rights and duties of citizens were similar to other socialist states, an included the right to serve in the military and the right to work. If the citizens clearly had no recognized political rights, they were, however, able to organize and get some political impact through the civil society, highly developed in Czechoslovakia. Moreover, the Beneš Decrees were very discriminatory against the German and Hungarian minorities of Czechoslovakia, who could not be granted citizenship. Emphasis was thus put on the unitary character of Czechoslovakia.

=== Definition of citizenship ===
As of December 31, 1992, citizens of the Czech and Slovak Federal Republic could either choose to become Czech or Slovak citizens. However, since in 1968 Slovakia was given some degree of autonomy, there existed a Slovak Republic that was granting citizenship. Thus, people who had Czechoslovak citizenship, but not Slovak citizenship had one year to apply for Slovak citizenship, which usually meant loss of Czech nationality. As for citizens of both Czechoslovakia and Slovak Republic, they could be automatically granted any of both citizenship, according to their choice.

=== Slovak citizenship laws ===
Children acquire their citizenship from their parents, even if they are adoptive parents, or by birth on Slovak territory if otherwise they would become stateless. Acquisition of citizenship is also granted upon request if a person has lived for at least 5 continuous years on Slovak territory and speaks Slovak language. Moreover, persons having no other citizenship are usually favoured. In addition, citizenship is easily granted to a person married to a Slovak citizen, or to a person who has economically, culturally, scientifically, or technologically greatly contributed to the Slovak society. As for loss to citizenship, a person who request it in order to get citizenship from another state, will be released from state bond.

=== Czech citizenship laws ===
Citizenship in Czech Republic is granted by Jus Sanguinis principle. Thus, nationality is granted to children of Czech Citizens. Unless the parents are stateless, and at least one is a permanent resident of the Czech Republic, the children born on Czech territory from non-Czech parents are not granted citizenship. However, children under 15 years old, born in Czech territory, whose parents’ nationality cannot be identified become Czech citizens. As for naturalization, permanent residents of the Czech Republic who have lived on the territory for at least 5 years and do not hold citizenship from another country and who has sufficient knowledge of Czech language, can apply to be granted of Czech citizenship. More flexibility is possible if the person demanding is the spouse of a Czech citizen, or if that person was adopted by a Czech citizen. As for the loss of citizenship, it is given on voluntary demand, unless that would make the person stateless.

=== Rights and duties ===
Czech and Slovak citizens basically have the same rights and duties than most citizens of other democratic countries, including the right to vote. Moreover, they cannot be refused access to their country and may benefit from diplomatic protection.

== See also ==
- Slovaks in Czechoslovakia (1918–1938)
- Slovaks in Czechoslovakia (1960–1990)
