= Czechoslovaks =

Czechoslovak people
Čechoslováci
- Flag of Czechoslovakia

Total population
- 15,000,000

Languages
- Czechoslovak

Religion
- Christianity, Judaism, Atheism

Related ethnic groups
- Czechs, Slovaks

Czechoslovaks (Czech and Slovak: Čechoslováci) is a designation that was originally designed to refer to a united panethnicity of ethnic Czechs and Slovaks. It has later adopted two distinct connotations, the first being the aforementioned supra-ethnic meaning, and the second as a general term for all citizens of the former Czechoslovakia regardless of ethnicity. Cultural and political advocates of Czechoslovak identity have historically ascribed the identity to be applicable to all people of Czech and Slovak heritage both in the country and in the diaspora.

Since the dissolution of Czechoslovakia and the establishment of Czech and Slovak nation states, the term ethnic Czechoslovaks has been used to refer to those who exclusively view themselves as Czechoslovaks with no other ethnic self-identification, many of these being of mixed ancestry.

The Czech–Slovak language group was summarized under the term "Bohemian–Moravian–Slovak" (Böhmisch-Mährisch-Slowakisch) in the Austrian census of Cisleithania beginning in the 1880s.

The Czechoslovak language was an attempt to create a single written standard, first proposed during the national revival in the 1830s and the official language of the First Czechoslovak Republic from 1920–1938.

Beginning in the 1990s, a political movement of Moravian linguistic separatism has developed. On the occasion of 2011 Census of the Czech Republic, several Moravian organizations (Moravané and Moravian National Community among others) led a campaign to promote the Moravian nationality and language. The 2011 census recorded 62,908 native speakers of Moravian. In 2021, the proportion of Moravians increased to 4.99% of the population and further 2.5% declared shared Czech and Moravian affiliation.

== History ==
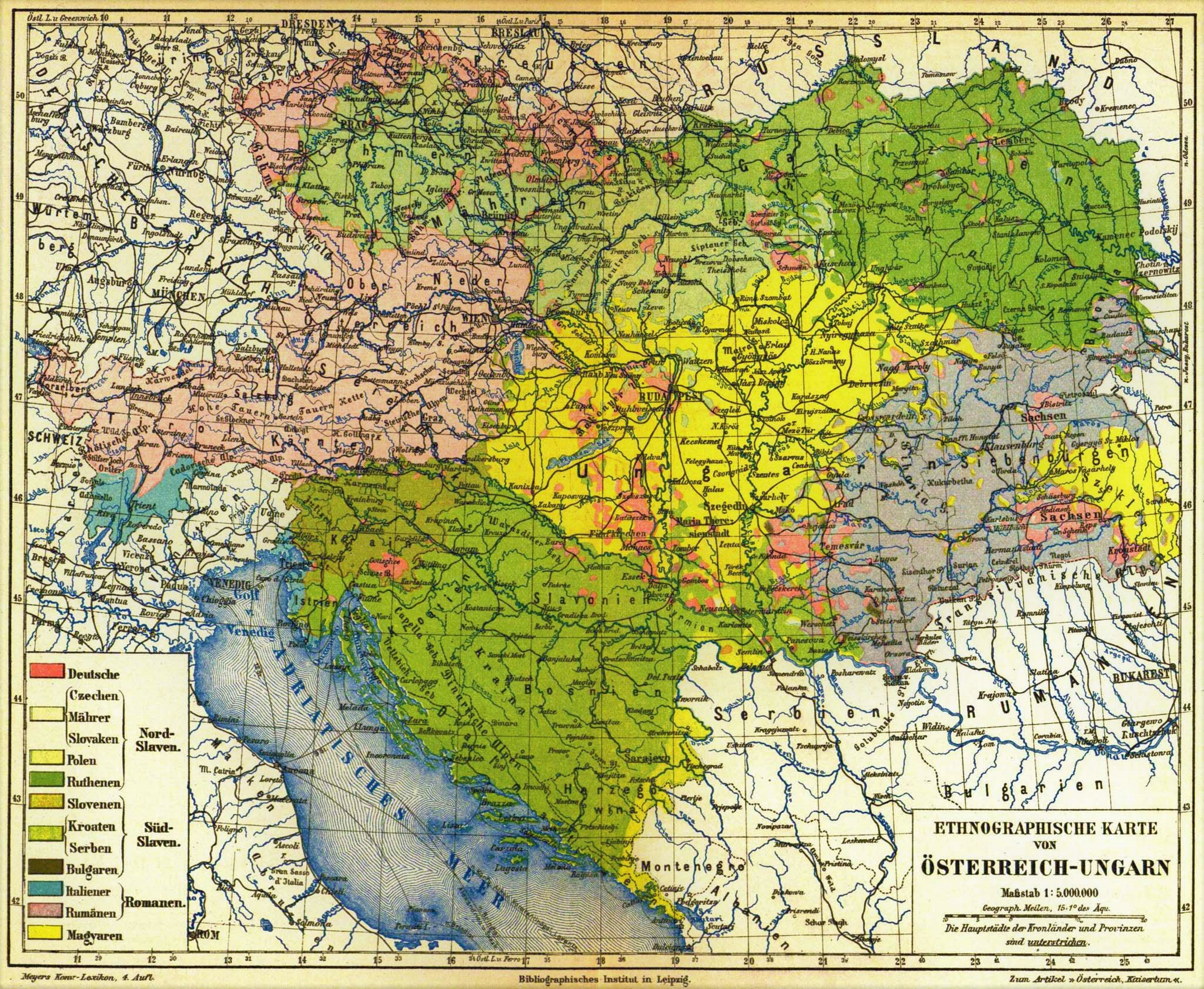
Czechs, Moravians and Slovaks as one nation in Austria-Hungary (1885–1890)

From the 19th century, when nationalism began to flourish in Europe, nations ceased to be identified by country, but by language. František Palacký, Ján Kollár and Karel Havlíček Borovský have already begun to promote the concept of a united nation in the Lands of the Bohemian Crown and in Slovakia (Upper Hungary). Czech revivalists saw in Slovakia the possibility of strengthening the Czech ethnic group within the Austrian Empire. Slovaks were perceived by Czech revivalists as Czechs who speak a dialect of Czech language. At that time, the term "Czechoslovak nation" was also used for the first time. This idea persisted in society for a remarkably long time, surviving even during the First Czechoslovak Republic. Only then did the population begin to abandon the idea (the concept of Czechoslovakism officially applied until 1948).

For the first time, the Czech (in the original "böhmisch"), Moravian and Slovak languages were officially united in the form of one Czech-Moravian-Slovak commanding language already in the Austro-Hungarian census in 1851 (see map by Karl von Czoernig-Czernhausen, 1855). However, according to the colloquial language, the nationality was not officially ascertained until the 1880 census.

According to the results of the 1910 census, 6,435,983 members of the Czech-Moravian-Slovak language were found in Cisleithania. However, the census for Austria-Hungary was considered by someones to be manipulated. In some census districts, the Czech language was cut off and replaced by the German or Moravian language (as a result, the replacement of the Czech language did not have Moravian significance, because both were included in the unified Czech-Moravian-Slovak language).

The Czechoslovak Constitution of 1920 definitively confirmed the unity of the Czechoslovak nation in its preamble. Until then, the Czech, Moravian, Silesian and Slovak nations were sometimes taken separately (for example, the "nation of Bohemia, the nation of Moravia and the nation of part of Silesia and the nation of Slovakia" was spoken of by the Saint-Germain Treaty minor). In the same year, the Czechoslovak language was enacted as the state language. Czechoslovak nationality was mentioned in official statistics.

This situation lasted until 1948, when the 1920 constitution was replaced by a new, people's democratic constitution, which already spoke of the Czechoslovak people as of two fraternal nations – the Czechs and the Slovaks. The language law was repealed in the same year. National statistics no longer counted on Czechoslovak nationality. Some emigrants in Canada and other countries repeatedly declared their Czechoslovak nationality during the census.

Since the 1991 census, thanks to the acquisition of absolute freedom to choose nationality (according to the Charter of Fundamental Rights and Freedoms, it is possible to subjectively choose any nationality, regardless of its objective existence or non-existence), respondents began to report again at the Czech census even to the special Czechoslovak nationality, but more than 10,000 respondents have never used this opportunity.

== See also ==
- Yugoslavs
