= 1921 population census in Bosnia and Herzegovina =

Population of Bosnia and Herzegovina in 1921 by religion
1. Eastern Orthodox Christians (43.9%)
2. Sunni Muslims (31.1%)
3. Catholics (23.6%)
4. Others (1.58%)

The 1921 population census in Bosnia and Herzegovina was the fifth census of the population of Bosnia and Herzegovina. On the territory of 51,200 km^{2} 1,890,440 persons lived. The Kingdom of Serbs, Croats and Slovenes conducted a population census on 31 January 1921.

== Results by religion ==
Religion	Number	Percentage	Number change	Percentage change
Serbian Orthodox Christians	829,290	43.87%	▲3,872	▲0.38%
Sunni Muslims	588,244	31.07%	▼23,893	▼1.18%
Catholics	444,308	23.58%	▲10,247	▲0.71%
Others	28,595	1.58%	▲2,167	▲0.19%

== Results by nationality ==
Population of Bosnia and Herzegovina in 1921 by nationality
1. Serbo-Croats (96.6%)
2. Germans (0.87%)
3. Poles (0.57%)
4. Others (1.93%)

Nation	Number	Percentage
Serbo-Croats	1,826,657	96.63%
Germans	16,471	0.87%
Poles	10,705	0.57%
Rusyns	8,146	0.43%
Czechoslovaks	6,377	0.34%
Slovenes	4,682	0.24%
Others	17,402	0.92%
