= Krajčír =

Krajčír (masculine) Krajčírová (feminine) is a Czech and Slovak surname.

- František Krajčír (1913–1986), Czechoslovak politician and statesman
- Marianna Némethová-Krajčírová (born 1948), Slovak former gymnast
- Timothy Krajcir
