= May Constitution =

May Constitution may refer to:

- Constitution of May 3, 1791, was a constitution of Polish–Lithuanian Commonwealth adopted on May 3, 1791
- May Constitution of 1934, an Austrian Constitution adopted on May 1, 1934
- Ninth-of-May Constitution, was a constitution of Czechoslovakia adopted on May 9, 1948
