= Effects on the environment in Czechoslovakia from Soviet influence during the Cold War =

Influence of the USSR on Czechoslovak environment

The involvement of the Soviet Union within Czechoslovak industry, during the Cold War, has contributed toward environmental, and subsequently social impacts, within Czechoslovakia. The concentration on heavy industry, under the Five Year plans enforced by the Soviet Union succeeding World War II, within Czechoslovakia caused environmental impacts through the depletion of natural resource and generation of pollution. Pollution contributed to the degradation of the air quality and thereafter degraded forests, increased lung disease in children and damaged the water supply. Attempts to spread awareness of the environmental consequences were met with government censorship, with little information publicly accessible nor even kept on the industrial impacts. A lack of an environmental government branch later caused issues for resolving these environmental issues and contributed to the lack of a cohesive approach, battling various conflicting ideals between branches. Soviet influence during the Cold War has contributed toward significant and ongoing environmental repercussions.

== Background ==
After World War II, the Soviet Union put in place five-year plans in the East European countries imitating their own five-year plans in order to recover from the war. The Soviets believed that the economic policies that helped them recover would similarly help the Eastern European countries recoup. Countries in the Eastern Bloc were instructed to build up the industries present in the Soviet Union – regardless of whether or not they had the natural resources to support those industries – or to concentrate on developing pre-existing industries which could benefit the Soviet Union. In the case of Czechoslovakia, the state was told to concentrate on heavy industry. This concentration on heavy industry depleted the country's natural resources at an extraordinarily fast rate and produced an excessive amount of pollution.

== Effects ==
The pollution produced by heavy industry seriously degraded air quality. The air contained high concentrations of sulfur dioxide because the energy production was largely based on combustion of fuel high in sulfur. As a result, 50 percent of the forests were either dead or dying. Cases of bronchitis and asthma in children almost doubled with the increase in the use of sulfur dioxide. The water, too, was affected by the excessive pollution, both from industrial fertilizers and oil spills. The lack of water waste treatment meant that a large portion of the water was undrinkable for the population, and some of the water was so bad that it was even unusable by the industry. Conditions were worst in Northern Bohemia, which was a part of the so-called ‘triangle of death’ that also included South-East East Germany and South-West Poland, but the effects were also felt beyond the region in which the pollution originated. The Danube River carried much of the pollution to other areas of the state and other countries, and acid rain brought the pollution directly to the cities, where it could eat away at the buildings and statues.

== The government's role ==
While pollution was increasing, records and information relating to pollution became increasingly inaccessible to the public. Students who tried to make the public aware of the problems were arrested and detained by the police. Often no records were even kept on the industrial effects on the environment. There were some people involved with non-governmental organizations that tried to correct the situation, but these groups were largely interested in acting as an adversary of the state. Under the 1960 Constitution of Czechoslovakia, the state was legally required to protect the quality of the environment as far as necessary to protect human health, but in northern Czechoslovakia, pollution reportedly shortened a person's life by three to four years. The government even acknowledged these poor living conditions by offering a bonus to people who lived in the area for more than ten years – called burial money by the people in the area.

The government faced problems in trying to solve environmental problems because there was no central branch responsible for environmental safety and protection. Instead, there were many different branches responsible for different aspects of the environment – one for water, one for land, one for air, etc., and these different branches often had conflicting interests. Each branch would try to enforce its own environmental priorities without regard to the overall environmental picture. Furthermore, these branches were in charge not only of the environmental issues in their area, but also of the economic issues, giving each branch a set of conflicting priorities, and economic needs would generally win out. When the government imposed fines for failures to comply with pollution regulations, it would also help industry pay off the fines, leaving industry with little incentive to change policies.
