= National Assembly (Czechoslovakia, 1920–1939) =

National Assembly of the Czechoslovak Republic Národní shromáždění republiky Československé (Czech) Národné zhromaždenie republiky Československej (Slovak)
- Legislative body in Czechoslovakia

Type
- Type: Bicameral
- Houses: Senate; Chamber of Deputies

History
- Established: 1920
- Disbanded: 1939
- Preceded by: Revolutionary National Assembly
- Succeeded by: Interim National Assembly
- Seats: 450 members: 150 Senate; 300 Chamber of Deputies

Elections
- Voting system: proportional representation
- Last election: 19 May 1935

Meeting place
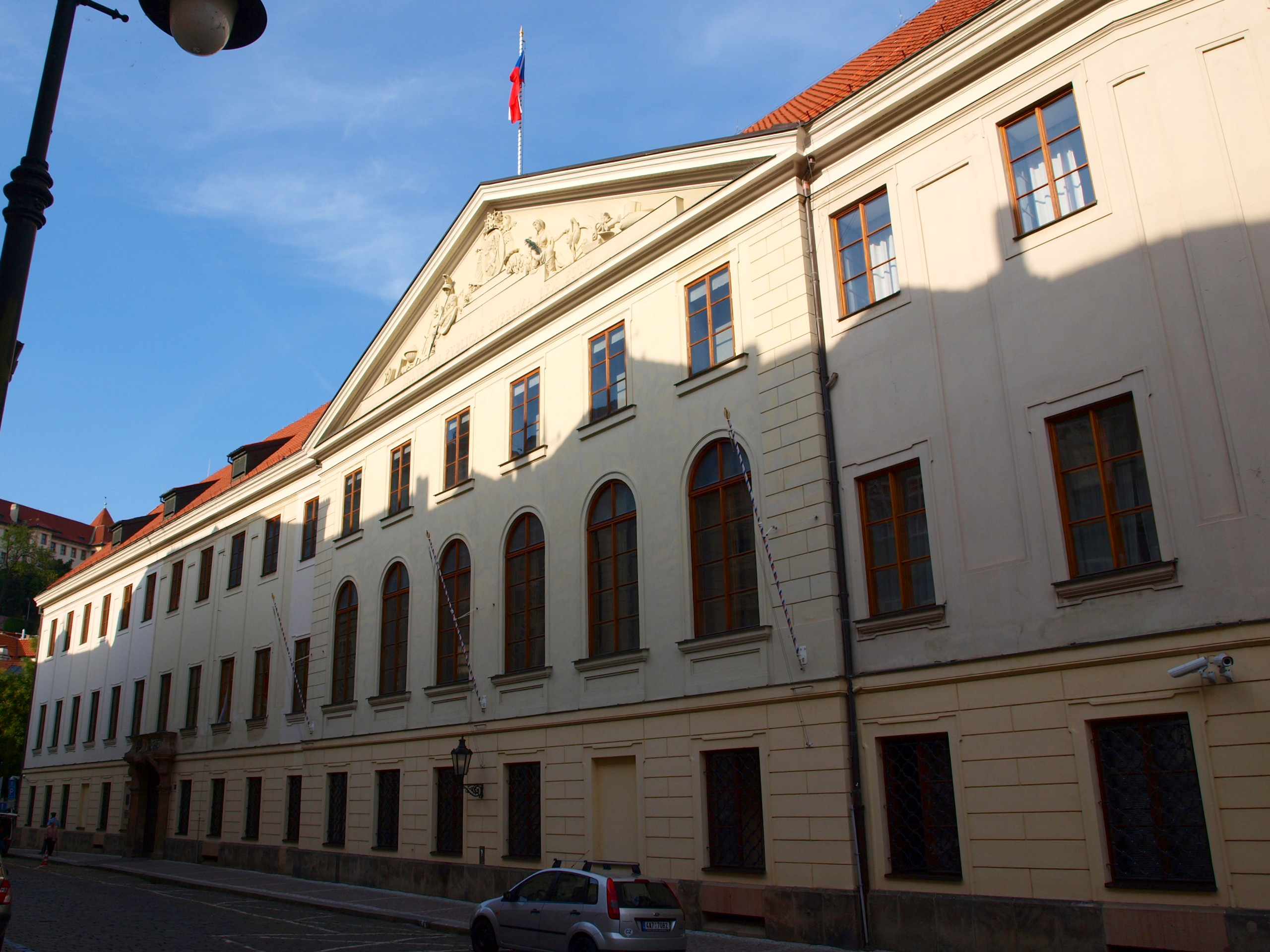
- Senate, Thun Palace, Prague
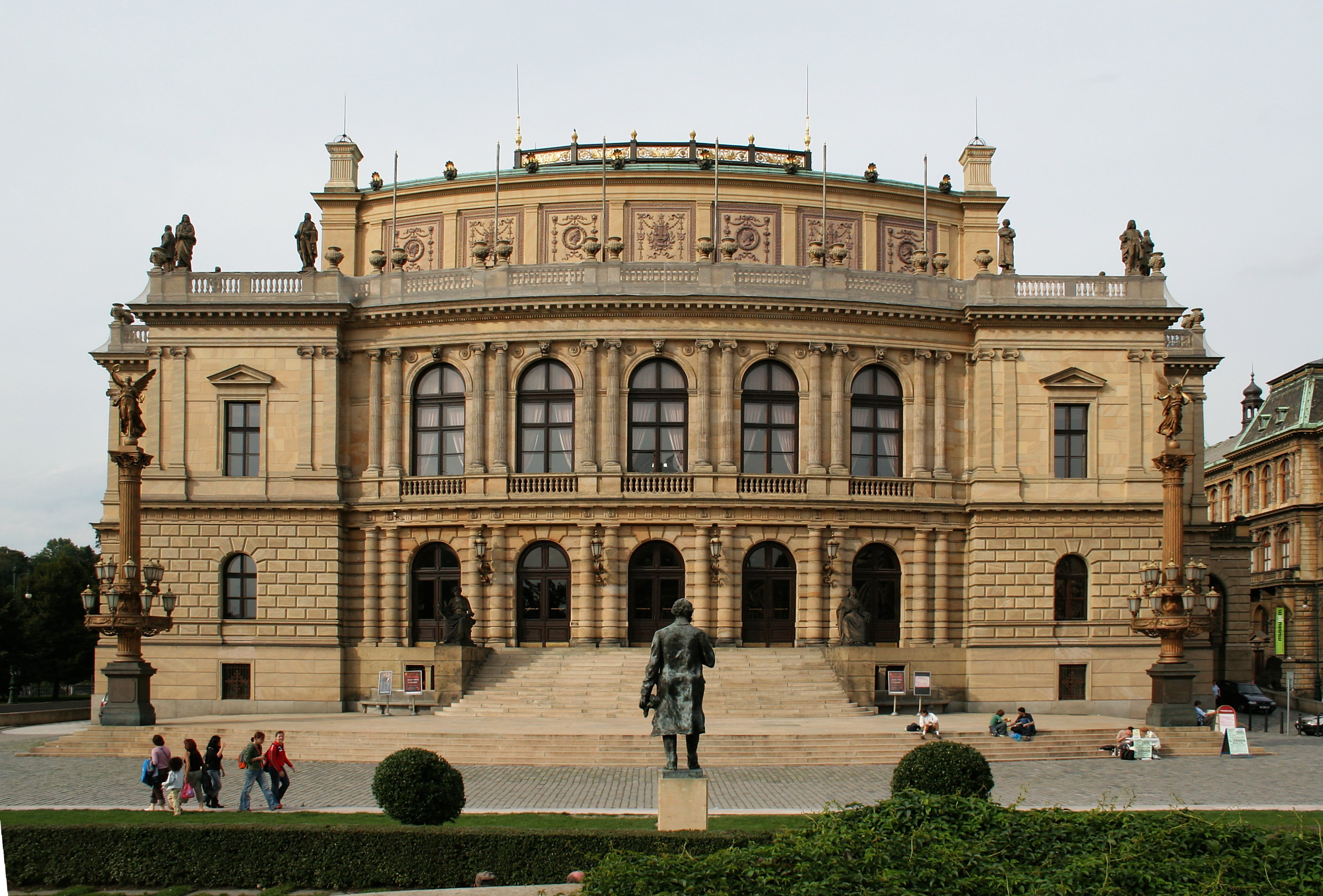
- Chamber of Deputies, Rudolfinum, Prague

Constitution
- Czechoslovak Constitution of 1920

The National Assembly (Czech: Národní shromáždění) was the bicameral parliament of Czechoslovakia from 1920 to 1939, during the First and Second Republics. It consisted of a Chamber of Deputies with 300 members and a Senate with 150 members.

== Leadership ==
=== Presidents of the Senate ===
- 1920 Cyril Horáček
- 1920–1924 Karel Prášek
- 1924–1926 Václav Donát
- 1926 Václav Klofáč
- 1926–1929 Mořic Hruban
- 1929–1939 František Soukup

=== Presidents of the Chamber of Deputies ===
- 1920–1925 František Tomášek
- 1925–1932 Jan Malypetr
- 1932–1935 František Staněk
- 1935 Bohumír Bradáč
- 1935–1939 Jan Malypetr
