= Czechoslovak language =

Definition for state language, 1920–1938

Czechoslovak
- českoslovenština
- Native to: Czechoslovakia
- Ethnicity: Czechs, Slovaks
- Language family: Indo-European: Balto-Slavic; Slavic; West Slavic; Czech–Slovak; Czech; Common Czech; Czechoslovak

Official status
- Official language in: Czechoslovakia (1920–1948)

Language codes
- ISO 639-3: –
- Czechoslovak Republic as of 1938.

The Czechoslovak language (Czech: jazyk československý or českoslovenština, Slovak: jazyk československý or Českoslovenčina) was a political sociolinguistic concept used in Czechoslovakia in 1920–1938 for the definition of the state language of the country which proclaimed its independence as the republic of two nations, i.e. ethnic groups, Czechs and Slovaks.

The Czech and Slovak languages are two closely related mutually intelligible West Slavic languages; they form their own sub-branch, called the Czech–Slovak languages. In practice, in the international discourse and documents, the role of "Czechoslovak" was played by Czech. However, in local speech in public discourse, and media, it was generally a form of Czech as spoken in the capital Prague (i.e. either Standard Czech formally or Common Czech informally) with limited introduction of some Slovak vocabulary. Meanwhile, the Constitution of 1920 and its derivative acts allowed the usage of minority languages provided that they were spoken by not less than 20% of the local population of certain areas.

Officially, the 1920 constitution was superseded on 9 May 1948 by the Ninth-of-May Constitution where the concept of the official language was omitted. The Czech and Slovak languages became de facto official in the parts of the country where they were spoken by the respective ethnic majority, while Czech also preserved the role Czechoslovak had in international affairs.

== History ==
The Czech-Slav Society (also called the Society for the Czechoslovak Language and Literature) was created in 1829 by students of the Evangelical Lyceum in Bratislava (German: Preßburg or Pressburg), and became an important entity in the Slovak national movement.

In 1836, Ľudovít Štúr, the leader of the Slovak national revival in the 19th century, wrote a letter to the important Czech historian František Palacký. Stating that the Czech language used by the Protestants in Upper Hungary had become incomprehensible for the ordinary Slovaks, Štúr proposed to create a unified 'Czechoslovak language', provided that the Czechs would be willing to use some Slovak words – just as Slovaks would officially accept some Czech words.

However, in the first half of the 20th century, the radical concept of 'Czechoslovakism' set forward the Czech language as the literary norm, while the Slovak language was considered to be a local dialect, as was the Moravian language. The concept of 'Czechoslovakism' was used to justify the establishment of Czechoslovakia to the world, because otherwise the statistical majority of the Czechs as compared to Germans would be rather weak.

=== Language legislation ===
On 29 February 1920, the National Assembly of the First Czechoslovak Republic adopted the Czechoslovak Constitution and, on the same day, a set of constitutional laws. The Language Act (Jazykový zákon) 122/1920 Sb. z. a n., on the grounds of § 129 of the Constitutional Charter (Czech Ústavní listina Československé republiky) has set the principles of the language regulations, where § 1 ruled that the Czechoslovak language "jazyk československý jest státním, oficielním jazykem republiky" ('is the state, or official language of the republic').

== See also ==
- Czech language
- Slovak language
- Comparison of Czech and Slovak
- History of the Czech language
- History of the Slovak language

== Sources ==
- Václav Dědina (1936). Československá vlastivěda (in Czech). Vol. 5. Praha: Sfinx. p. 164.
- Ján Gronský (2005). Komentované dokumenty k ústavním dějinám Československa (in Czech). Praha: Univerzita Karlova. p. 107. ISBN 9788024610276.
- Josef Holub (1933). Stručný slovník etymologický jazyka československého [A Short Etymological Dictionary of the Czechoslovak Language]. Prague: Státní nakladatelství.
- František Cyril Kampelík (1847). Krása a wýbornosti česko-slowenského jazyka, jímžto asi 8 milionů lidí w Čechách a na Morawě, we Slezsku a Slowensku mluwí [The Beauty and Excellence of the Czech-Slovak Language, Spoken by 8 Million People in Bohemia, Moravia, Silesia and Slovakia]. Prague: Tiskem knížecí arcibiskupské knihtiskárny. https://cdk.lib.cas.cz/search/i.jsp?pid=uuid:4d3c8252-239d-43c0-bb4a-ab1011fd9f9e
- Tomasz Kamusella (2007). 'The Political Expediency of Language-Making in Central Europe: The Case of Czechoslovak' (pp 217–222). Studia Slavica / Slovanské Studie [Yearbook, ed. by Jana Raclavská and Aleksandra Wieczorek]. Vol 11. Opole: Wydawnictwo Uniwersytetu Opolskiego and Ostrava: Ostravská univerzita. https://www.academia.edu/34513234/The_Political_Expediency_of_Language-Making_in_Central_Europe_The_Case_of_Czechoslovak_pp_217-222_._2007._Studia_Slavica_Slovanské_Studie_Yearbook_ed._by_Jana_Raclavská_and_Aleksandra_Wieczorek_._Vol_11._Opole_Wydawnictwo_Uniwersytetu_Opolskiego_and_Ostrava_Ostravská_univerzita
- Antonín Macht (1937). Metodika jazyka československého na československých školách národných [The Teaching Methodology of the Czechoslovak Language in Elementary Education]. Olomouc: R. Promberger.
- Antonín Procházka (1947). O vývoji jazyka československého. Příručka k čítance pro pátou třídu středních škol [On the Development of the Czechoslovak Language: An Accompanying Handbook for the reader for the Fifth Grade of Elementary School]. Prague: Česká grafická Unie.
- Osnovy jazyka československého (jako jazyka vyučovacího) [The Fundamentals of the Czechoslovak Language as a Medium of Instruction]. Prague: Státní nakladatelství.
- Práva jazyka československého v obcích s německou správou [The Rights of the Czechoslovak Language in the Communes with German as a Language of Administration]. Prague: Národní rada československá.
- Miloš Weingart (1919). Vývoj jazyka a písemnictví československého [The Development of Czechoslovak Language and Literature]. Prague: Ministerstvo národnej obrany.
