= Ninth-of-May Constitution =

Fundamental law of Czechoslovakia from 1948 to 1960

- Created: 14 April 1948
- Ratified: 9 May 1948
- Date effective: 9 May 1948
- Repealed: 11 July 1960
- Author: Constituent National Assembly
- Signatories: Government: Klement Gottwald (KSČ); Viliam Široký (KSČ); Bohumil Laušman (ČSSD); Zdeněk Fierlinger (ČSSD); Antonín Zápotocký (KSČ); Július Ďuriš (KSČ); Vladimír Clementis (KSČ); František Krajčír (KSČ); Ludvík Svoboda (KSČ); Alois Petr (ČSL); Josef Ševčík (ČSNS); Emanuel Šlechta (ČSNS); Antonín Gregor (KSČ); Alois Neuman (ČSNS); Václav Nosek (KSČ); Antonín Gregor (KSČ); Vojtěch Erban (ČSSD); Julius Dolanský (ČSSD); Josef Plojhar (ČSL); Zdeněk Nejedlý (KSČ); Ludmila Jankovcová (ČSSD); Alexej Čepička (KSČ); Vavro Šrobár (SS)
- Purpose: To adopt people's democracy and replace 1920 Constitution

The Ninth-of-May (1948) Constitution (Czech: Ústava Československé republiky; Slovak: Ústava Československej republiky) was the second permanent constitution of Czechoslovakia, in force from 1948 to 1960. It came into force on 9 May, shortly after the communist seizure of power in the country on 25 February 1948. It replaced the 1920 Constitution.

Work on the new document had been underway since the summer of 1946. As a result, it was not a fully Communist constitution. It was superficially similar to its predecessor; indeed, several provisions were directly carried over from the earlier document. However, it contained a number of elements borrowed from the "Stalin Constitution" of the Soviet Union. The Soviet imprint on the final document was strong enough that President Edvard Beneš refused to sign it and later resigned. It was flagrantly violated by the Communist Party of Czechoslovakia (KSČ), the government and many individuals throughout the period of its being in force, especially regarding the provisions on private ownership and human rights.

Since the country's liberation, there had been many disputes concerning nationalization, the relation of Czechs and Slovaks and other crucial issues. After the Communist take-over in February 1948, the Communist concept was largely applied. The constitution did not organize government administration under the Leninist principle of democratic centralism (a provision only incorporated in the following "socialist" 1960 Constitution of Czechoslovakia); indeed, it made no references to Communism or the KSČ. However, it proclaimed Czechoslovakia a "people's democratic state," and declared that Czechoslovakia had embarked on a "national and democratic revolution" that it intended to defend against "domestic and foreign reaction." It billed the 1948 coup d'etat as a defense of "the People's Democratic Order."

The constitution stated that the people were "the sole source of all power." It declared that the economy of Czechoslovakia was based on nationalized industries, nationalized trade and a nationalized financial sector. The government sector was declared the basis of the economy, but it protected the private sector and cooperatives as well. It also granted a small degree of autonomy to Slovakia, which was given its own legislative body and governmental structure, although these were made subordinate to the central authorities in Prague. The parliament continued to be called the National Assembly, though the Senate was abolished.

Unlike most Communist constitutions, the Ninth-of-May Constitution did not replace the presidency with a collective body. It also afforded protections against arbitrary arrest; no one could be taken into custody without a warrant. On the other hand, the provisions enshrining civil rights were effectively neutered by a provision that forbade their use in order to make "statements and acts that constitute a threat to the independence, entirety, and unity of the State, the Constitution, the Republican form of government, or the People's Democratic Order" and allowed their restriction "when events occur that threaten in increased measure the independence, entirety, and unity of the State, the Constitution, the Republican form of government, and the People's Democratic Order, or public law and order." However, even the constitutional restriction of civil rights had a superficial similarity to the concept of the Liberal democratic basic order adopted by the West German constitution around the same time, rather than the more ideologically-explicit terms used in fully communist constitutions such as allowing these rights only "in the interests of building communism" and generally prohibiting activities which are "detrimental to the interests of society" (as determined by the Government, i.e., by the Communist Party).

The constitutional guarantee of press freedom was rendered meaningless by provisions making movies and broadcasting state monopolies and giving the government sole power to decide who could publish periodicals. Judges were required to abide by both laws and government ordinances, thus taking away judges' right to strike down executive actions that did not accord with statutes.

== See also ==
- 1960 Constitution of Czechoslovakia
- History of Czechoslovakia (1948–1989)
