= František Krajčír =

Czechoslovak politician and diplomat

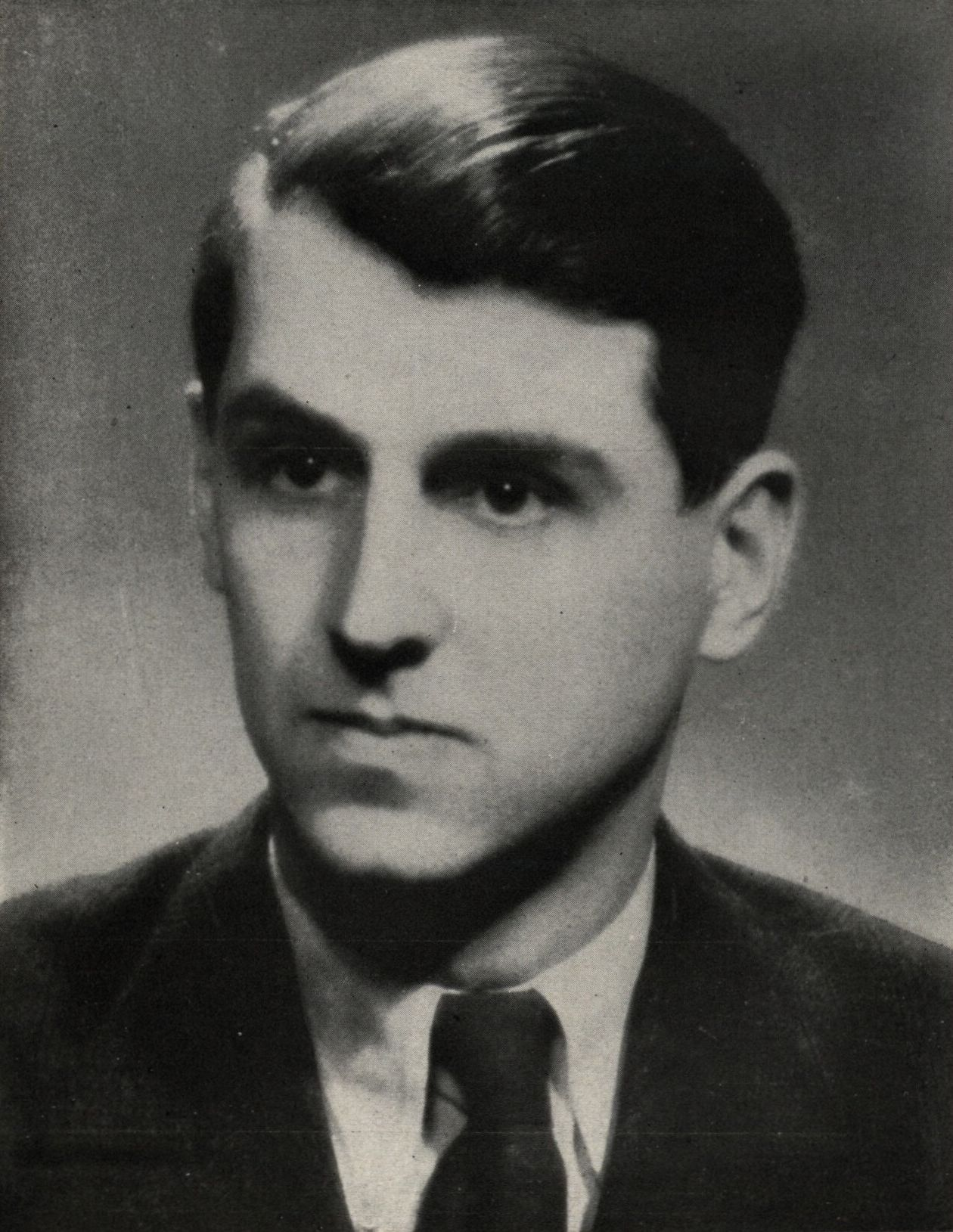
- Krajčír in 1948

Minister of Foreign Trade
- In office 17 January 1959 – 5 January 1963
- Prime Minister: Viliam Široký
- Preceded by: Richard Dvořák
- Succeeded by: František Hamouz

Minister of Internal Trade
- In office 25 February 1948 – 17 January 1959
- Prime Minister: Klement Gottwald (1948); Antonín Zápotocký (1948–1953); Viliam Široký (1953–1959)
- Preceded by: Hubert Ripka
- Succeeded by: Richard Dvořák

Personal details
- Born: 12 June 1913 Vienna, Austria-Hungary
- Died: 18 May 1986 (aged 72) Prague, Czechoslovakia
- Party: Communist Party of Czechoslovakia

František Krajčír (12 June 1913 – 18 May 1986) was a Czechoslovak communist politician and diplomat.

== Biography ==
The son of a butcher, Krajčír was born and raised in Vienna before moving with his parents to Prague in 1926. After training as a bookseller and publisher, he was employed at the publishing house and bookstore V. Neubert a synové in Prague before opening his own bookstore in Hořice in 1937. After the occupation of the Czech lands by Nazi Germany in 1939, Krajčír approached the communist resistance movement,

Krajčír formally joined the Communist Party of Czechoslovakia (KSČ) in 1945, and was appointed chairman of the city administration in Hořice immediately after the end of World War II. In the May 1946 elections he was elected to the Constituent National Assembly, and in the same year, he was elected to the Central Committee of the KSČ. In February 1948, he was appointed minister of internal trade. He would remain in this position in various governments until 1959, when he took up the office of minister of foreign trade, in which he served until early 1963.

After serving as a deputy prime minister under Jozef Lenárt from November 1963 to April 1968, Krajčír was transferred to diplomatic service; he was the Czechoslovak ambassador to East Germany from January 1969 to the summer of 1971, and then deputy minister of foreign affairs from September 1971 to October 1978, after which he retired.

== Honours and awards ==
- Order of Labour (1963)
- Order of Victorious February (1973)
- Order of the Republic (1978)
