= Czechoslovakia =

1918–1992 country in Central Europe

Czechoslovakia Československo (Note: In other recognized languages of Czechoslovakia: German: Tschechoslowakei; Hungarian: Csehszlovákia; Polish: Czechosłowacja; Rusyn: Чеськословеньско, Cheskoslovensko; Yiddish: טשעכאסלאוואקיי, Tshekhaslavakey)
- 1918–1939 (1939–1945: government-in-exile); 1945–1992
- Flag Coat of arms
- Motto: Pravda vítězí / Pravda víťazí (1918–1990); Veritas vincit (1990–1992) "Truth prevails"
- Anthems: Kde domov můj and Nad Tatrou sa blýska
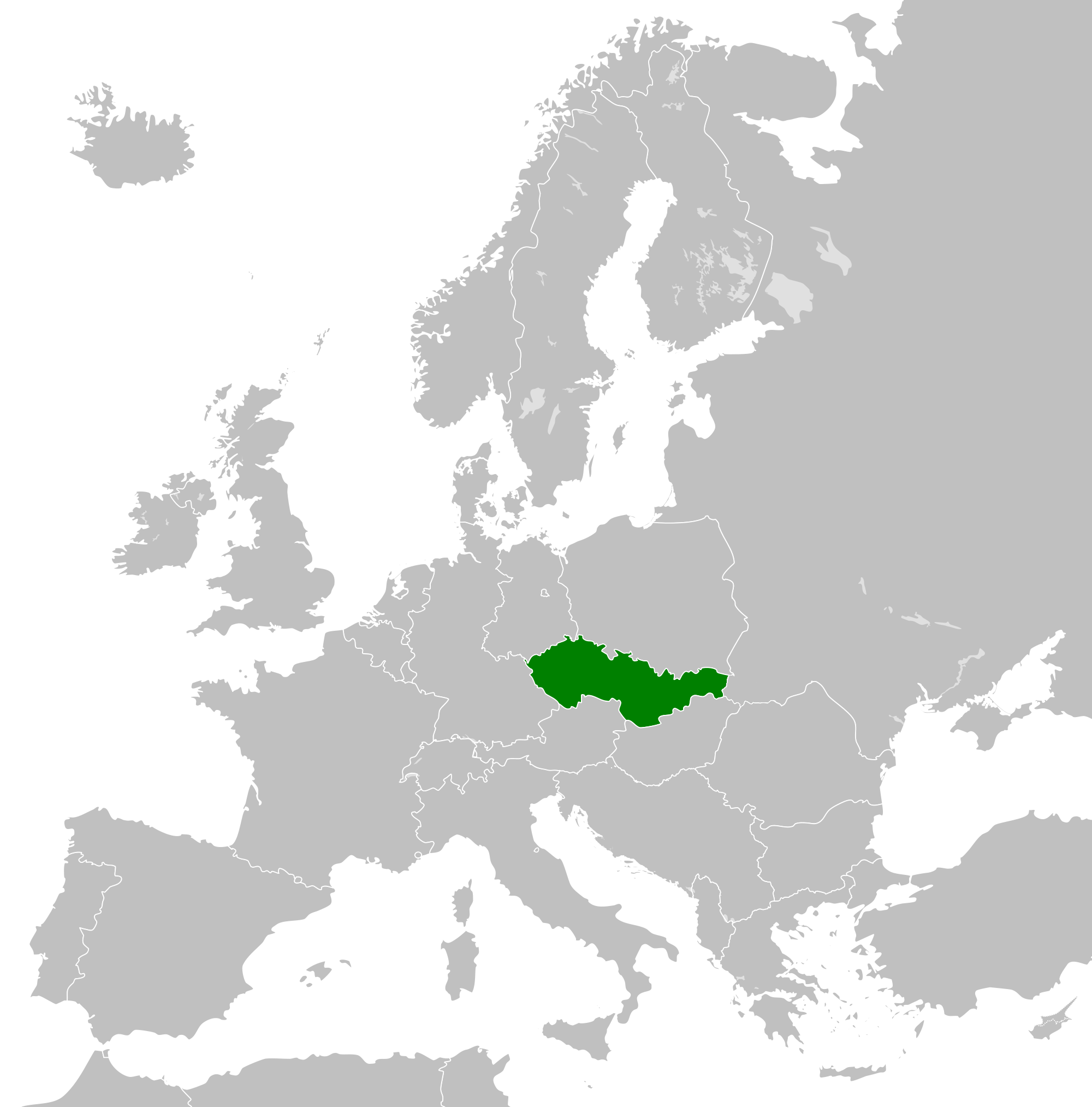
- Capital and largest city: Prague; 50°05′N 14°25′E
- Official languages: Czechoslovak, after 1948 Czech · Slovak
- Recognised languages: German; Hungarian; Rusyn; Polish
- Demonym: Czechoslovak
- President
  - 1918–1935: Tomáš G. Masaryk
  - 1989–1992: Václav Havel
- De facto ruler
  - 1948–1953: Klement Gottwald
  - 1989: Karel Urbánek
- Prime Minister
  - 1918–1919 (first): Karel Kramář
  - 1992 (last): Jan Stráský
- Legislature: Revolutionary National Assembly (1918–1920); National Assembly (1920–1939); Interim National Assembly (1945–1946); Constituent National Assembly (1946–1948); National Assembly (1948–1969); Federal Assembly (1969–1992)
- History
  - Proclamation: 28 October 1918
  - Munich Agreement: 30 September 1938
  - Partition: 14 March 1939
  - Re-establishment: 10 May 1945
  - Coup d'état: 25 February 1948
  - Soviet occupation: 21 August 1968
  - Velvet Revolution: 17–28 November 1989
  - Dissolution: 1 January 1993
- GDP (PPP): 1989 estimate
  - Total: $123 billion
  - Per capita: $7,897
- HDI (1990 formula): 0.897 very high
- Currency: Czechoslovak koruna
- Calling code: +42
- ISO 3166 code: CS
- Internet TLD: .cs
Preceded by	Succeeded by
Austria-Hungary	Czech Republic; Slovakia
- Today part of: Czech Republic; Slovakia; Ukraine
- Calling code +42 was withdrawn in the winter of 1997. The number range was divided between the Czech Republic (+420) and Slovak Republic (+421). Current ISO 3166-3 code is "CSHH".

Czechoslovakia (Note: /ˌtʃɛkoʊsloʊˈvæki.ə, ˈtʃɛkə-, -slə-, -ˈvɑː-/ CHEK-oh-sloh-VAK-ee-ə, CHEK-ə-, -slə-, -VAH-; Czech and Slovak: Československo, Česko-Slovensko)) (Czech: Československo) was a country in Central Europe. The country was bordered by Austria and Hungary to the south, Germany (Note: Bordered both West and East until 1990) to the west and northwest, Poland to the northeast, and Soviet Union to its southeast. (Note: Ukraine became a sovereign state following the dissolution of the Soviet Union in 1991.) To the southeast Czechoslovakia had a hilly and mostly mountainous landscape that covered an area of 127,906 square kilometers (49,385 sq mi) (Note: As of 1990) with a mostly temperate continental and oceanic climate. The capital and largest city was Prague; other major cities and urban areas include Brno, Ostrava, Plzeň, Liberec, Bratislava and Košice.

Championed by nationalists and first presidents Tomáš Masaryk and Edvard Beneš, Czechoslovakia declared independence in 1918 amid the dissolution of Austria-Hungary and had its sovereignty affirmed in the Treaty of Saint-Germain-en-Laye. Following the Munich Agreement in 1938, the Sudetenland was annexed by Nazi Germany while the Second Czechoslovak Republic was formed as a client state. In 1939, the German Protectorate of Bohemia and Moravia was proclaimed while the Slovak Republic was administered separately and Carpathian Ruthenia was annexed by Hungary. Although the state thus ceased to exist, following the outbreak of World War II, Beneš formed a government-in-exile that was recognised by the Allies.

Following liberation by the Red Army in 1944 and 1945, Czechoslovakia was re-established under its pre-1938 borders, with the exception of Carpathian Ruthenia, which became part of the Ukrainian SSR (a republic of the Soviet Union). The Communist Party seized power in a coup in 1948 and afterward, Czechoslovakia was part of the Eastern Bloc with a planned economy. Its economic status was formalized in membership of Comecon from 1949 and its defense status in the Warsaw Pact of 1955. A period of political liberalization in 1968, the Prague Spring, ended when the Soviet Union, assisted by other Warsaw Pact countries, invaded Czechoslovakia. In 1989, as Marxist–Leninist governments and communism were ending all over Central and Eastern Europe, Czechoslovaks peacefully deposed their communist government during the Velvet Revolution, which began on 17 November 1989 and ended 11 days later on 28 November when all of the top Communist leaders and the Communist party itself resigned. On 31 December 1992, Czechoslovakia split peacefully into the two sovereign states of the Czech Republic and Slovakia.

== Characteristics ==
Form of state

- 1918–1937: A democratic republic championed by Tomáš Masaryk.
- 1938–1939: After the annexation of Sudetenland by Nazi Germany in 1938, the region gradually turned into a state with loosened connections among the Czech, Slovak, and Ruthenian parts. A strip of southern Slovakia and Carpathian Ruthenia was redeemed by Hungary, and the Trans-Olza region was annexed by Poland.
- 1939–1945: The remainder of the state was dismembered and became split into the Protectorate of Bohemia and Moravia and the Slovak Republic, while the rest of Carpathian Ruthenia was occupied and annexed by Hungary. A government-in-exile continued to exist in London, supported by the United Kingdom, United States and their Allies; after the German invasion of Soviet Union, it was also recognized by the Soviet Union. Czechoslovakia adhered to the Declaration by United Nations and was a founding member of the United Nations.
- 1946–1948: The country was governed by a coalition government with communist ministers, including the prime minister and the minister of interior. Carpathian Ruthenia was ceded to the Soviet Union.
- 1948–1989: The country became a Marxist-Leninist state under Soviet domination with a command economy. In 1960, the country officially became a socialist republic, the Czechoslovak Socialist Republic. It was a satellite state of the Soviet Union.
- 1989–1990: Czechoslovakia formally became a federal republic comprising the Czech Socialist Republic and the Slovak Socialist Republic. In late 1989, the communist rule came to an end during the Velvet Revolution followed by the re-establishment of a democratic parliamentary republic.
- 1990–1992: Shortly after the Velvet Revolution, the state was renamed the Czech and Slovak Federative Republic, consisting of the Czech Republic and the Slovak Republic (Slovakia) until the peaceful dissolution on 31 December 1992.

Neighbours

- Austria 1918–1938, 1945–1992
- Germany (both predecessors, West Germany and East Germany, were neighbors between 1949 and 1990)
- Hungary
- Poland
- Romania 1918–1938
- Soviet Union 1945–1991
- Ukraine 1991–1992 (Soviet Union member until 1991)

Topography

The country was of generally irregular terrain. The western area was part of the north-central European uplands. The eastern region was composed of the northern reaches of the Carpathian Mountains and lands of the Danube River basin.

Climate

The weather was characterized by mild to cold winters and mild to warm summers, influenced by the Atlantic Ocean from the west, the Baltic Sea from the north, and Mediterranean Sea from the south. The country was situated in the transition zone between the oceanic and continental climate types.

== Names ==
- 1918–1938: Czechoslovak Republic (abbreviated ČSR), or Czechoslovakia, before the formalization of the name in 1920, also known as Czecho-Slovakia or the Czecho-Slovak state
- 1938–1939: Czecho-Slovak Republic, or Czecho-Slovakia
- 1945–1960: Czechoslovak Republic (ČSR), or Czechoslovakia
- 1960–1990: Czechoslovak Socialist Republic (ČSSR), or Czechoslovakia
- 1990: Czechoslovak Federative Republic (ČSFR)
- 1990–1992: Czech and Slovak Federative Republic (ČSFR), or Czechoslovakia

== History ==
=== Origins ===
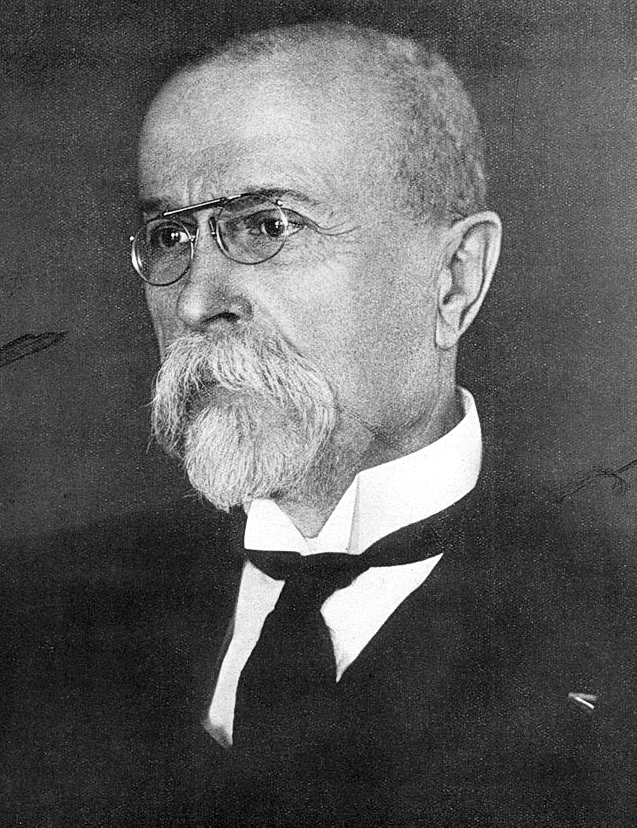
Tomáš Garrigue Masaryk, founder and first president

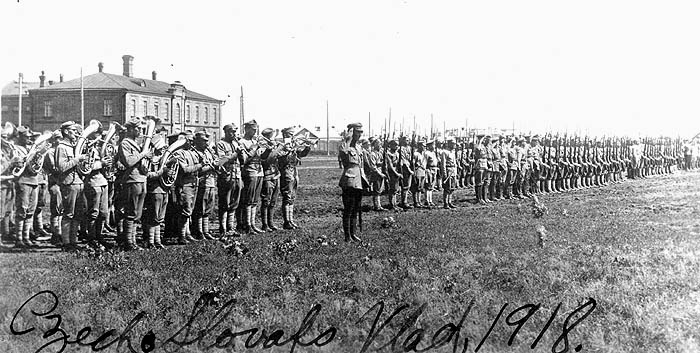
Czechoslovak troops in Vladivostok (1918)

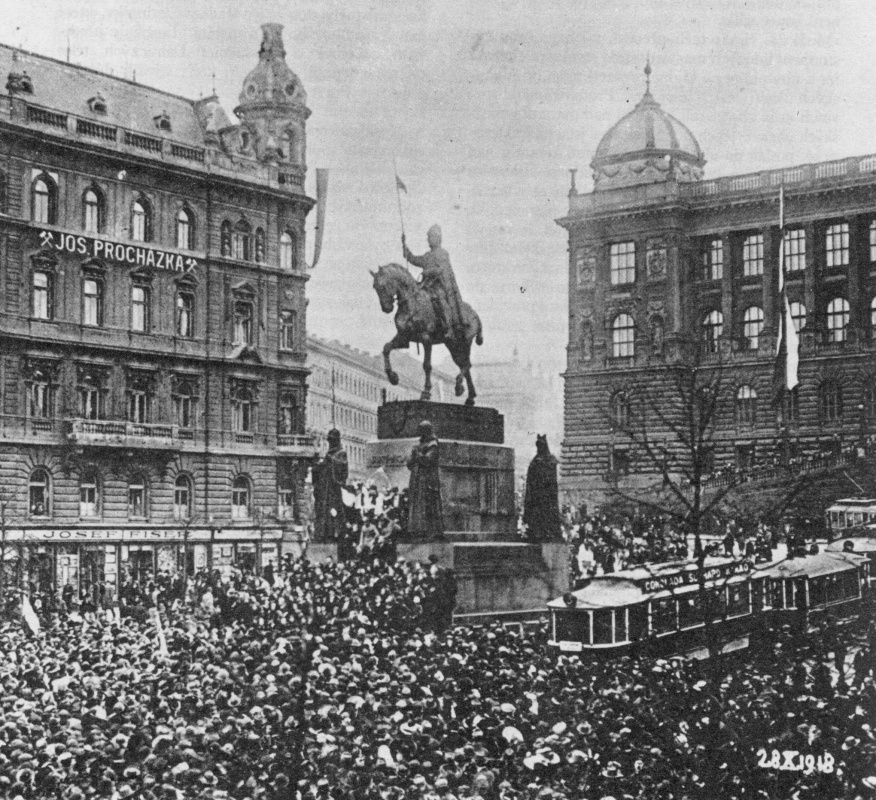
Czechoslovak declaration of independence rally in Prague on Wenceslas Square, 28 October 1918

The area was part of the Austro-Hungarian Empire until it collapsed at the end of World War I. The new state was founded by Tomáš Garrigue Masaryk, who served as its first president from 14 November 1918 to 14 December 1935. He was succeeded by his close ally Edvard Beneš (1884–1948).

The roots of Czech nationalism go back to the 19th century, when philologists and educators, influenced by Romanticism, promoted the Czech language and pride in the Czech people. Nationalism became a mass movement in the second half of the 19th century. Taking advantage of the limited opportunities for participation in political life under Austrian rule, Czech leaders such as historian František Palacký (1798–1876) founded various patriotic self-help organizations which provided a chance for many of their compatriots to participate in communal life before independence. Palacký supported Austro-Slavism and worked for a reorganized federal Austrian Empire, which would protect the Slavic speaking peoples of Central Europe against Russian and German threats.

An advocate of democratic reform and Czech autonomy within Austria-Hungary, Masaryk was elected twice to the Reichsrat (Austrian Parliament), from 1891 to 1893 for the Young Czech Party, and from 1907 to 1914 for the Czech Realist Party, which he had founded in 1889 with Karel Kramář and Josef Kaizl.

During World War I a number of Czechs and Slovaks, the Czechoslovak Legions, fought with the Allies in France and Italy, while large numbers deserted to Russia in exchange for its support for the independence of Czechoslovakia from the Austrian Empire. With the outbreak of World War I, Masaryk began working for Czech independence in a union with Slovakia. With Edvard Beneš and Milan Rastislav Štefánik, Masaryk visited several Western countries and won support from influential publicists. The Czechoslovak National Council was the main organization that advanced the claims for a Czechoslovak state.

=== First Czechoslovak Republic ===
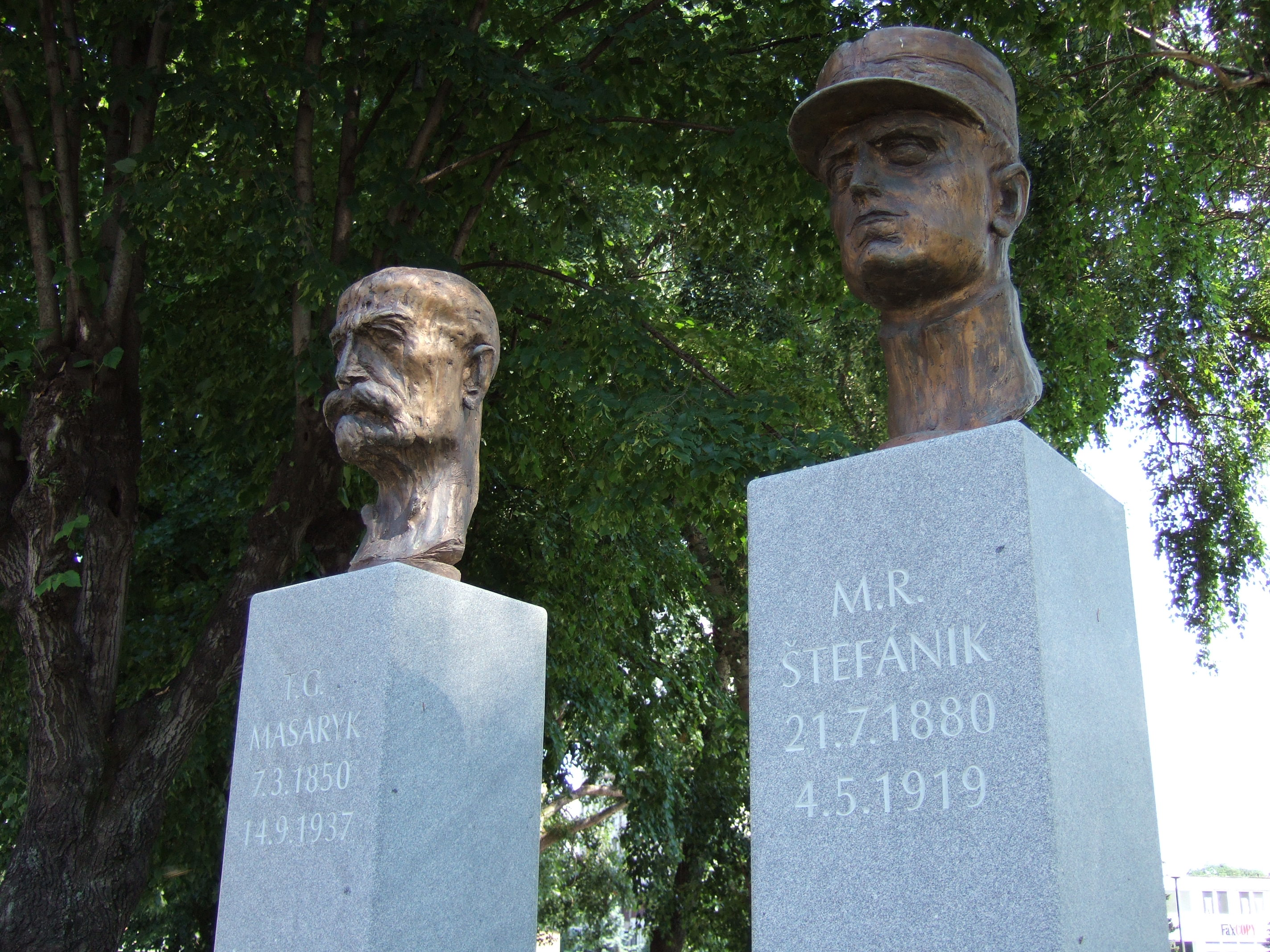
A monument to Tomáš Garrigue Masaryk and Milan Štefánik—both key figures in early Czechoslovakia

==== Formation ====
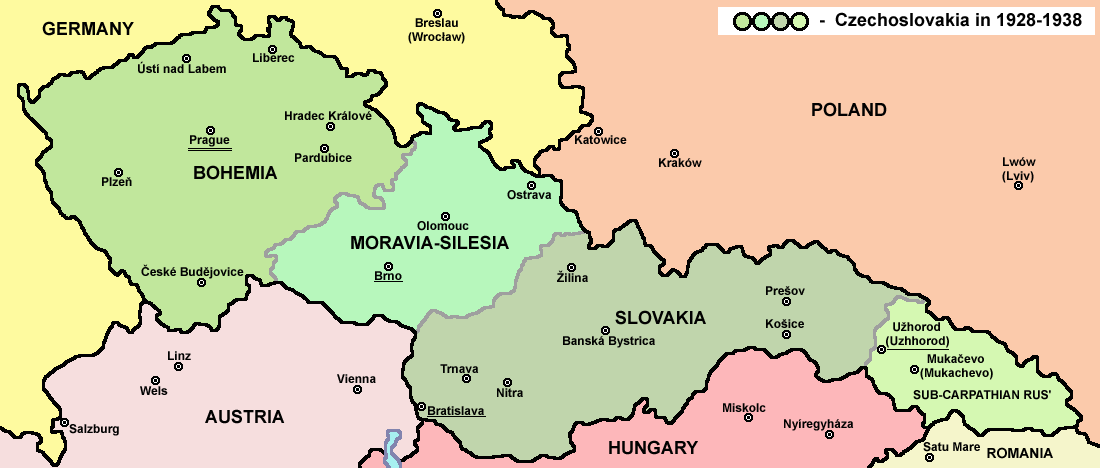
Czechoslovakia in 1928

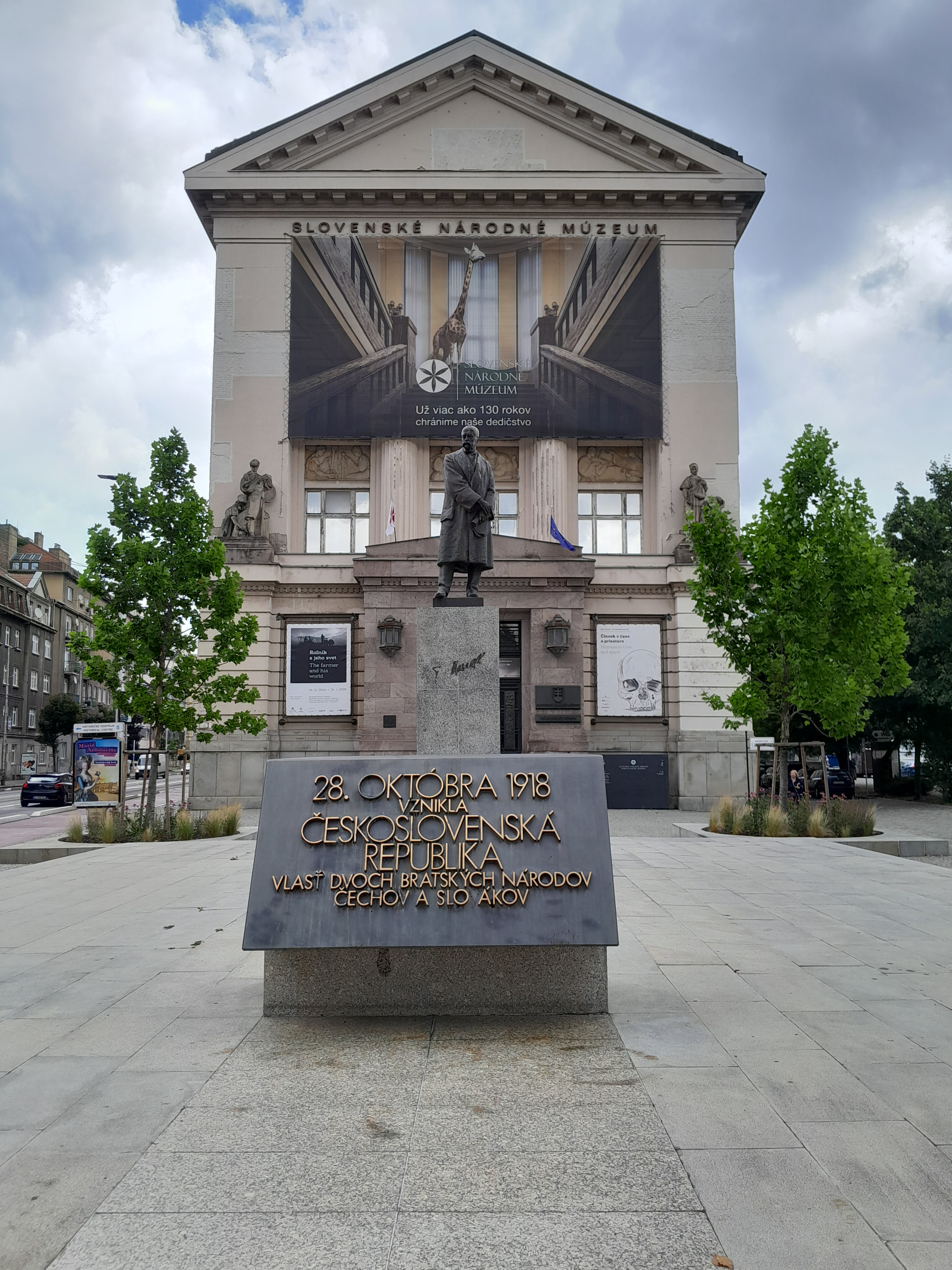
Plaque dedicated to formation of Czechoslovakia, in Bratislava

The Bohemian Kingdom ceased to exist in 1918 when it was incorporated into Czechoslovakia. Czechoslovakia was founded in October 1918, as one of the successor states of the Austro-Hungarian Empire at the end of World War I and as part of the Treaty of Saint-Germain-en-Laye. It consisted of the present-day territories of Bohemia, Moravia, parts of Silesia making up present-day Czech Republic, Slovakia, and a region of present-day Ukraine called Carpathian Ruthenia. Its territory included some of the most industrialized regions of the former Austria-Hungary.

==== Ethnicity ====
Linguistic map of Czechoslovakia in 1930

The new country was a multi-ethnic state, with Czechs and Slovaks as constituent peoples. The population consisted of Czechs (51%), Germans (22%), Slovaks (16%), Hungarians (5%) and Rusyns (4%). Many of the Germans, Hungarians, Ruthenians and Poles and some Slovaks, felt oppressed because the political elite did not generally allow political autonomy for minority ethnic groups. This policy led to unrest among the non-Czech population, particularly in German-speaking Sudetenland, which initially had proclaimed itself part of the Republic of German-Austria in accordance with the self-determination principle.

The state proclaimed Czechoslovakism as its official ideology, defining the population as a single Czechoslovak nation rather than distinct Czech and Slovak ethnicities. This unifying doctrine was met with significant resistance and disagreement from Slovak nationalists and other ethnic minorities within the country. Once a unified Czechoslovakia was restored after World War II (after the country had been divided during the war), the conflict between the Czechs and the Slovaks surfaced again. The governments of Czechoslovakia and other Central European nations deported ethnic Germans, reducing the presence of minorities in the nation. Most of the Jews had been killed during the war by the Germans.

Ethnicities of Czechoslovakia in 1921
Czechs and Slovaks	8,759,701	64.37%
Germans	3,123,305	22.95%
Hungarians	744,621	5.47%
Ruthenians	461,449	3.39%
Jews	180,534	1.33%
Poles	75,852	0.56%
Others	23,139	0.17%
Foreigners	238,784	1.75%
Total population	13,607,385

Ethnicities of Czechoslovakia in 1930
Czechs and Slovaks	10,066,000	68.35%
Germans	3,229,000	21.93%
Ruthenians	745,000	5.06%
Hungarians	653,000	4.43%
Jews	354,000	2.40%
Poles	76,000	0.52%
Romanians	14,000	0.10%
Foreigners	239,000	1.62%
Total population	14,726,158

*Jews identified themselves as Germans or Hungarians (and Jews only by religion not ethnicity), the sum is, therefore, more than 100%.

=== Interwar period ===
During the period between the two world wars Czechoslovakia was a democratic state. The population was generally literate, and contained fewer alienated groups. The influence of these conditions was augmented by the political values of Czechoslovakia's leaders and the policies they adopted. Under Tomas Masaryk, Czech and Slovak politicians promoted progressive social and economic conditions that served to defuse discontent.

Foreign minister Beneš became the prime architect of the Czechoslovak-Romanian-Yugoslav alliance (the "Little Entente," 1921–38) directed against Hungarian attempts to reclaim lost areas. Beneš worked closely with France. Far more dangerous was the German element, which after 1933 became allied with the Nazis in Germany.

Czech-Slovak relations came to be a central issue in Czechoslovak politics during the 1930s. The increasing feeling of inferiority among the Slovaks, who were hostile to the more numerous Czechs, weakened the country in the late 1930s. Slovakia became autonomous in the fall of 1938, and by mid-1939, Slovakia had become independent, with the First Slovak Republic set up as a satellite state of Nazi Germany and the far-right Slovak People's Party in power.

After 1933, Czechoslovakia remained the only democracy in central and eastern Europe.

=== Munich Agreement, the Second Republic, and the Two-Step German Occupation ===
The partition of Czechoslovakia after Munich Agreement

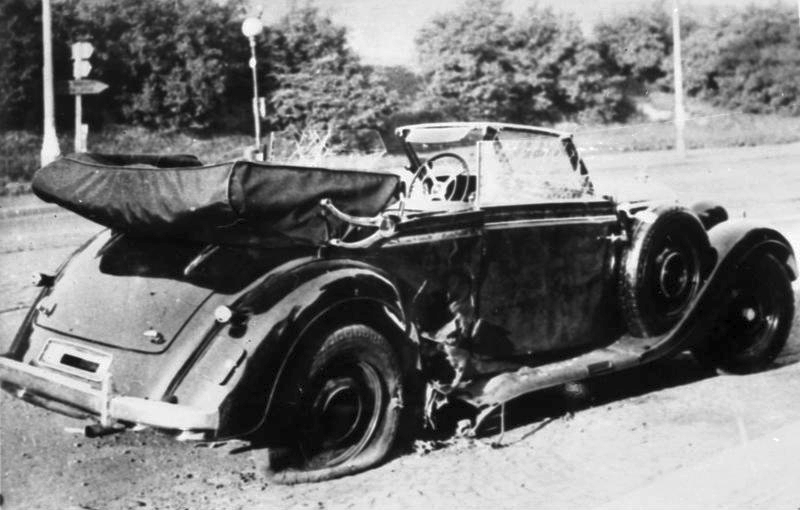
The car in which Reinhard Heydrich was fatally injured in 1942

Territory of the Second Czechoslovak Republic (1938–1939)

In September 1938, Adolf Hitler demanded control of the Sudetenland. On 29 September 1938, Britain and France ceded control in the Appeasement at the Munich Conference; France ignored the military alliance it had with Czechoslovakia. During October 1938, Nazi Germany occupied the Sudetenland border region, effectively crippling Czechoslovak defences.

The First Vienna Award assigned a strip of southern Slovakia and Carpathian Ruthenia to Hungary. Poland occupied Zaolzie, an area whose population was majority Polish, in October 1938.

On 14 March 1939, the remainder ("rump") of Czechoslovakia was dismembered by the proclamation of the Slovak State, the next day the rest of Carpathian Ruthenia was occupied and annexed by Hungary, while the following day the German Protectorate of Bohemia and Moravia was proclaimed.

The eventual goal of the German state under Nazi leadership was to eradicate Czech nationality through assimilation, deportation, and extermination of the Czech intelligentsia; the intellectual elites and middle class made up a considerable number of the 200,000 people who passed through concentration camps and the 250,000 who died during German occupation. Under Generalplan Ost, it was assumed that around 50% of Czechs would be fit for Germanization. The Czech intellectual elites were to be removed not only from Czech territories but from Europe completely. The authors of Generalplan Ost believed it would be best if they emigrated overseas, as even in Siberia they were considered a threat to German rule. Just like Jews, Poles, Serbs, and several other nations, Czechs were considered to be untermenschen by the Nazi state. In 1940, in a secret Nazi plan for the Germanization of the Protectorate of Bohemia and Moravia it was declared that those considered to be of racially Mongoloid origin and the Czech intelligentsia were not to be Germanized.

The deportation of Jews to concentration camps was organized under the direction of Reinhard Heydrich, and the fortress town of Terezín was made into a ghetto way station for Jewish families. On 4 June 1942 Heydrich died after being wounded by an assassin in Operation Anthropoid. Heydrich's successor, Colonel General Kurt Daluege, ordered mass arrests and executions and the destruction of the villages of Lidice and Ležáky. In 1943 the German war effort was accelerated. Under the authority of Karl Hermann Frank, German minister of state for Bohemia and Moravia, some 350,000 Czech laborers were dispatched to the Reich. Within the protectorate, all non-war-related industry was prohibited. Most of the Czech population obeyed quiescently up until the final months preceding the end of the war, while thousands were involved in the resistance movement.

For the Czechs of the Protectorate Bohemia and Moravia, German occupation was a period of brutal oppression. Czech losses resulting from political persecution and deaths in concentration camps totaled between 36,000 and 55,000. The Jewish populations of Bohemia and Moravia (118,000 according to the 1930 census) were virtually annihilated. Many Jews emigrated after 1939; more than 70,000 were killed; 8,000 survived at Terezín. Several thousand Jews managed to live in freedom or in hiding throughout the occupation.

Despite the estimated 136,000 deaths at the hands of the Nazi regime, the population in the Protectorate saw a net increase during the war years of approximately 250,000 in line with an increased birth rate.

On 6 May 1945, the third US Army of General Patton entered Plzeň from the south west. On 9 May 1945, Soviet Red Army troops entered Prague.

=== Third and Fourth Republics ===
Socialist coat of arms in 1960–1989

After World War II, pre-war Czechoslovakia was reestablished, with the exception of Subcarpathian Ruthenia, which was annexed by the Soviet Union and incorporated into the Ukrainian Soviet Socialist Republic. The Beneš decrees were promulgated concerning ethnic Germans (see Potsdam Agreement) and ethnic Hungarians. Under the decrees, citizenship was abrogated for people of German and Hungarian ethnic origin who had accepted German or Hungarian citizenship during the occupations. In 1948, this provision was cancelled for the Hungarians, but only partially for the Germans. The government then confiscated the property of the Germans and expelled about 90% of the ethnic German population, over 2 million people. Those who remained were collectively accused of supporting the Nazis after the Munich Agreement, as 97.32% of Sudeten Germans had voted for the NSDAP in the December 1938 elections. Almost every decree explicitly stated that the sanctions did not apply to antifascists. Some 250,000 Germans, many married to Czechs, some antifascists, and also those required for the post-war reconstruction of the country, remained in Czechoslovakia. The Beneš Decrees still cause controversy among nationalist groups in the Czech Republic, Germany, Austria and Hungary.

Following the expulsion of the ethnic German population from Czechoslovakia, parts of the former Sudetenland, especially around Krnov and the surrounding villages of the Jeseníky mountain region (Nízký Jeseník and Hrubý Jeseník) in northeastern Czechoslovakia, were settled in 1949 by Communist refugees from Northern Greece who had left their homeland as a result of the Greek Civil War. These Greeks made up a large proportion of the town and region's population until the late 1980s/early 1990s. Although defined as "Greeks," the Greek Communist community of Krnov and the Jeseníky region actually consisted of an ethnically diverse population, including Greek Macedonians, Macedonians, Vlachs, Pontic Greeks and Turkish speaking Urums or Caucasus Greeks.

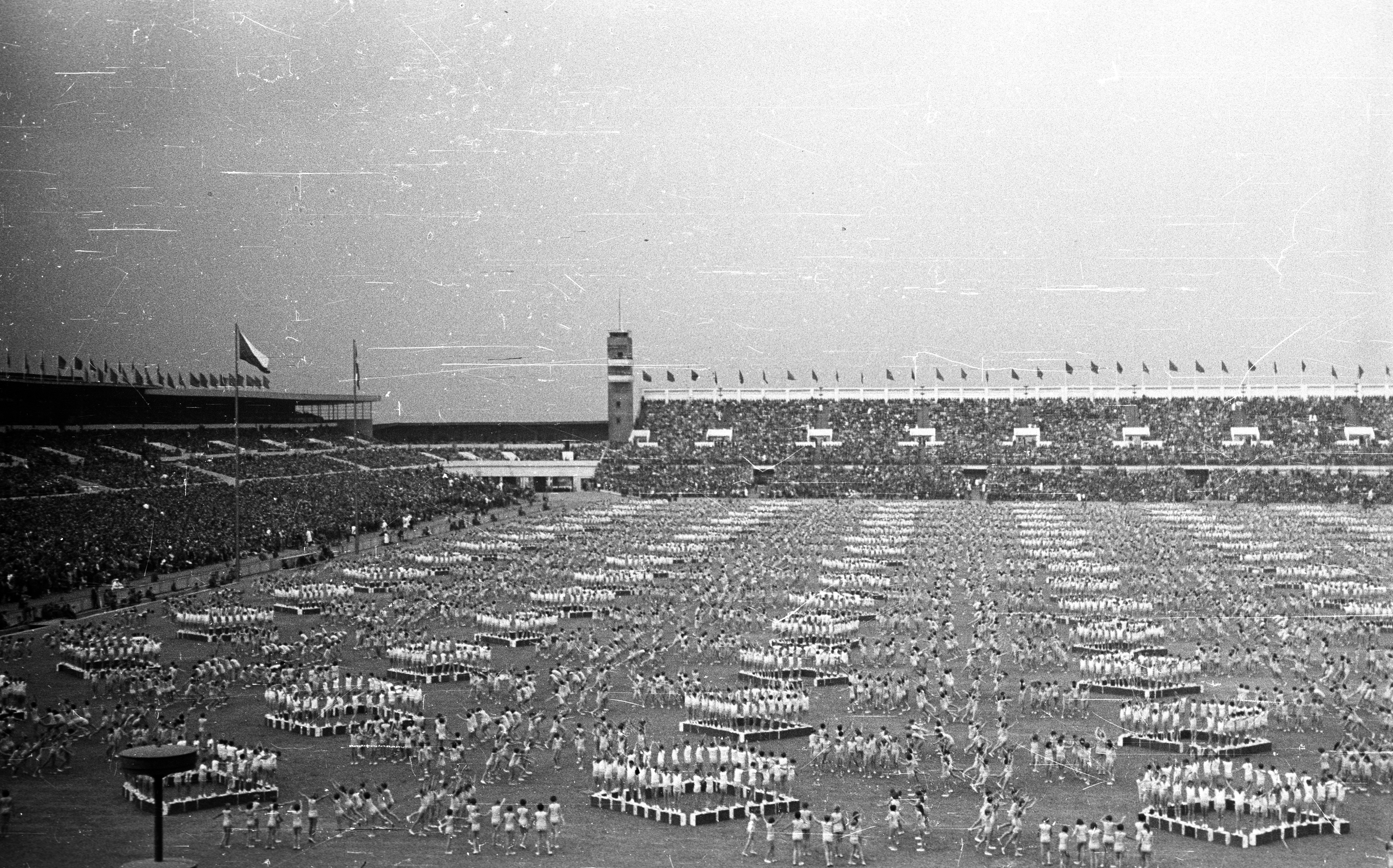
Spartakiad in 1965

Carpathian Ruthenia (Podkarpatská Rus) was occupied by (and in June 1945 formally ceded to) the Soviet Union. In the 1946 parliamentary election, the Communist Party of Czechoslovakia was the winner in the Czech lands, and the Democratic Party won in Slovakia. In February 1948 the Communists seized power. Although they would maintain the fiction of political pluralism through the existence of the National Front, except for a short period in the late 1960s (the Prague Spring) the country had no liberal democracy. Since citizens lacked significant electoral methods of registering protest against government policies, periodically there were street protests that became violent. For example, there were riots in the town of Plzeň in 1953 (31 May – 2 June 1953) reflecting economic discontent. Police and army units put down the rebellion. Hundreds were injured but no one was killed. While its economy remained more advanced than those of its neighbors in Eastern Europe, Czechoslovakia grew increasingly economically weak relative to Western Europe.

The currency reform of June 1953 caused dissatisfaction among the Czechoslovak citizens. To equalize the wage rate, Czechoslovaks had to turn in their old money for new at a decreased value. The banks also confiscated savings and bank deposits to control the amount of money in circulation.

In the 1950s, Czechoslovakia experienced high economic growth (averaging 7% per year), which allowed for a substantial increase in wages and living standards, thus promoting the stability of the regime.

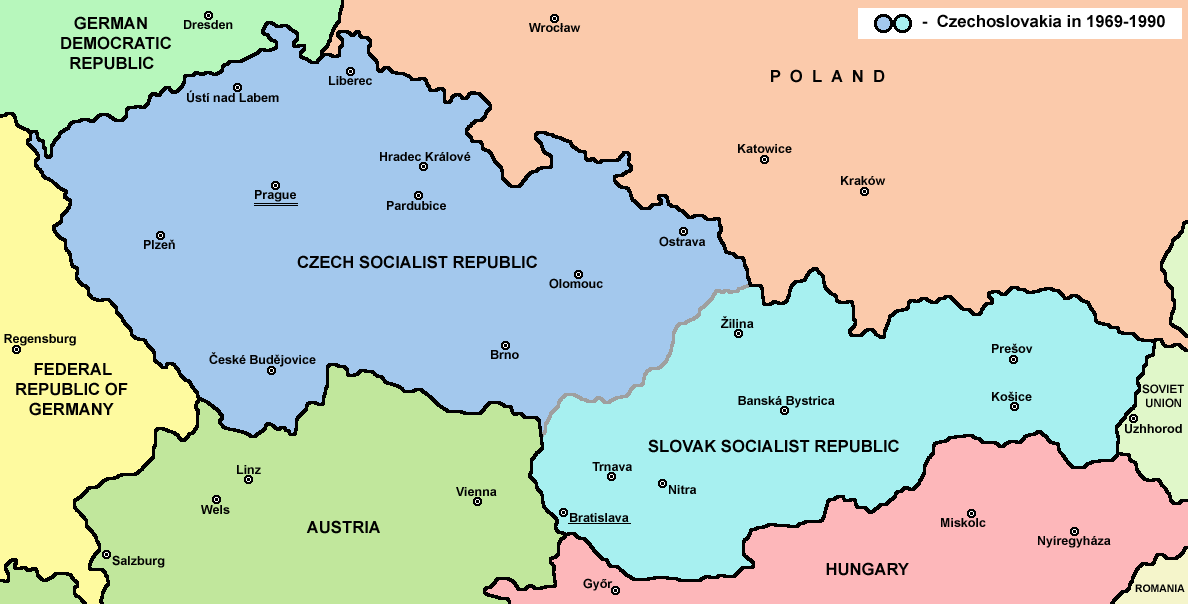
Czechoslovakia after 1969

On 5 January 1968, the reformer Alexander Dubček was appointed to the key post of First Secretary of the Czechoslovak Communist Party. A brief period of liberalization known as the Prague Spring began.

On 3 August 1968, representatives of the Communist and Worker's parties of Bulgaria, Hungary, East Germany, Poland, the USSR, and Czechoslovakia signed the Bratislava Declaration. After that conference, the Soviet troops left Czechoslovak territory but came back 21 August 1968 and invaded Czechoslovakia together with troops of Bulgaria, Poland and Hungary.

Their tanks rolled into Czechoslovakia on the night of 20–21 August 1968.

Soviet Communist Party General Secretary Leonid Brezhnev viewed this intervention as vital for the preservation of the Soviet, socialist system and vowed to intervene in any state that sought to replace Marxism–Leninism with capitalism.

In the week after the beginning of the invasion, there was a spontaneous campaign of civil resistance against the occupation. This resistance involved a wide range of acts of non-cooperation and defiance: this was followed by a period in which the Communist Party of Czechoslovakia (CPC) leadership, having been forced in Moscow to make concessions to the Soviet Union, gradually put the brakes on their earlier liberal policies.

Meanwhile, one plank of the reform program had been carried out: in 1968–69, Czechoslovakia was turned into a federation of the Czech Socialist Republic and Slovak Socialist Republic. The theory was that under the federation, social and economic inequities between the Czech and Slovak halves of the state would be largely eliminated. A number of ministries, such as education, now became two formally equal bodies in the two formally equal republics. However, the centralized political control by the CPC severely limited the effects of federalization.

The 1970s saw the rise of the dissident movement in Czechoslovakia, represented among others by Václav Havel. The movement sought greater political participation and expression in the face of official disapproval, manifested in limitations on work activities, which went as far as a ban on professional employment, the refusal of higher education for the dissidents' children, police harassment and prison.

In March 1985, Mikhail Gorbachev became President of the Soviet Union. Since 1986, he and his advisers promoted Glasnost and Perestroika. Later, they implemented the Sinatra doctrine. Milos Jakeš, a hardliner and communist leader (since 17 December 1987) of the Communist Party of Czechoslovakia, resigned on 24 November 1989 along with the CPC's entire Presidium.

=== After 1989 ===
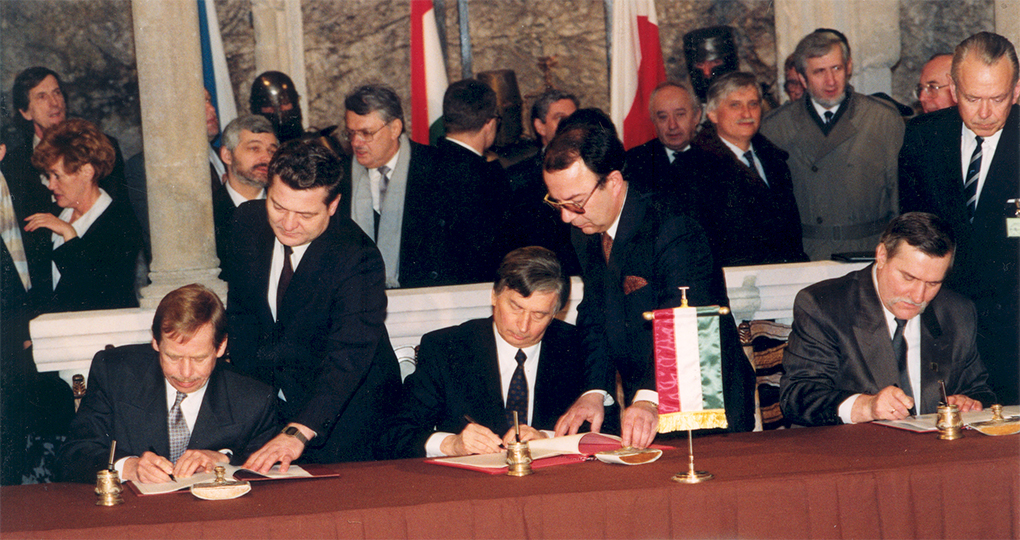
The Visegrád Group signing ceremony in February 1991

In 1989, the Velvet Revolution restored democracy. This occurred around the same time as the fall of communism in Romania, Bulgaria, Hungary, East Germany and Poland.

The word "socialist" was removed from the country's full name on 29 March 1990 and replaced by "federal."

In 1992, because of growing nationalist tensions in the government, Czechoslovakia was peacefully dissolved by parliament. On 31 December 1992, it formally separated into two independent countries, the Czech Republic and the Slovak Republic.

== Government and politics ==
After World War II, a political monopoly was held by the Communist Party of Czechoslovakia (KSČ). The leader of the KSČ was de facto the most powerful person in the country during this period. Gustáv Husák was elected first secretary of the KSČ in 1969 (changed to general secretary in 1971) and president of Czechoslovakia in 1975. Other parties and organizations existed but functioned in subordinate roles to the KSČ. All political parties, as well as numerous mass organizations, were grouped under umbrella of the National Front. Human rights activists and religious activists were severely repressed.

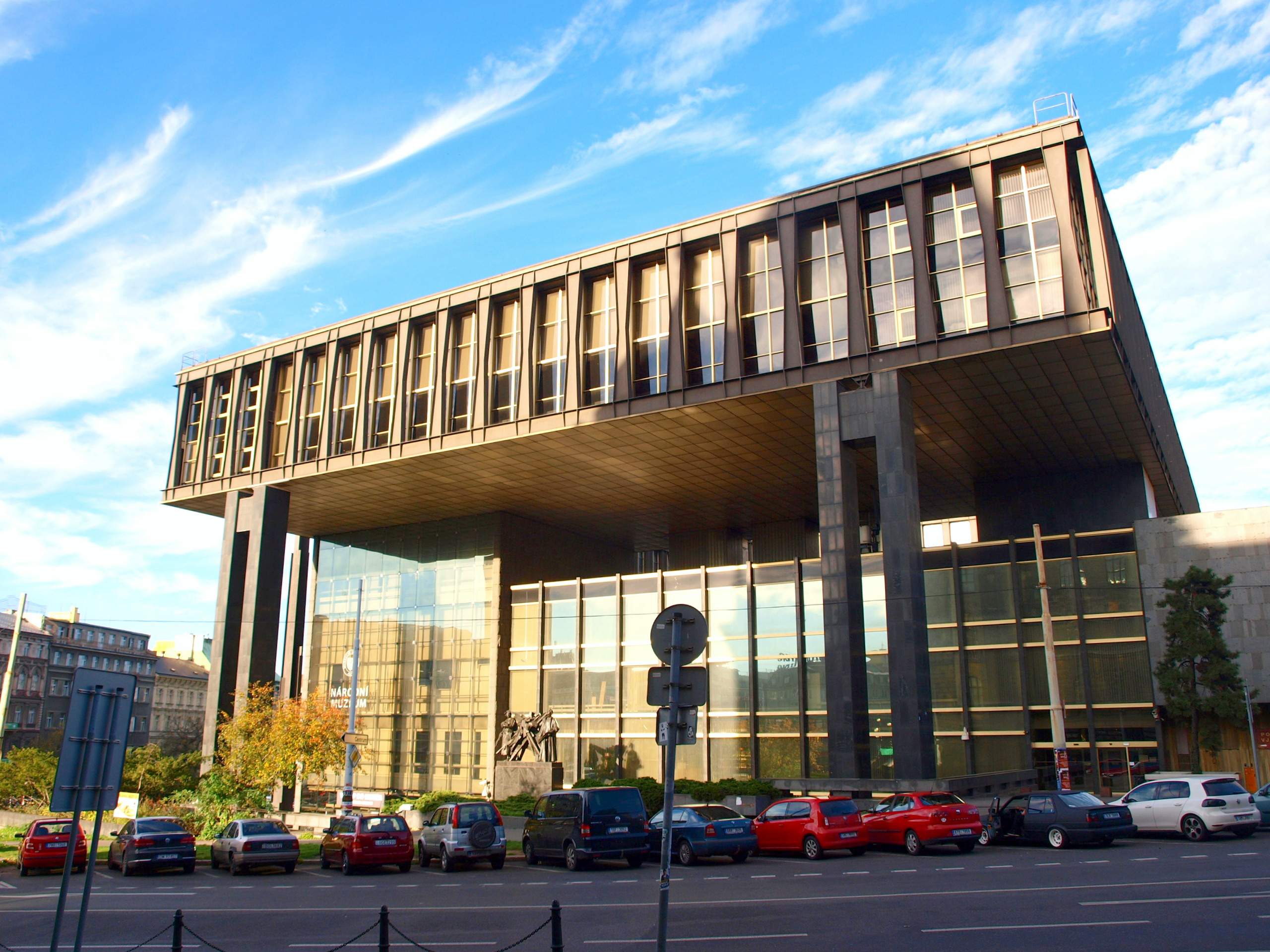
Federal Assembly in Prague

=== Constitutional development ===
Federative coat of arms in 1990–1992

Czechoslovakia had the following constitutions during its history (1918–1992):

- Temporary constitution of 14 November 1918 (democratic): see History of Czechoslovakia (1918–1938)
- The 1920 constitution (The Constitutional Document of the Czechoslovak Republic), democratic, in force until 1948, several amendments
- The Communist 1948 Ninth-of-May Constitution
- The Communist 1960 Constitution of the Czechoslovak Socialist Republic with major amendments in 1968 (Constitutional Law of Federation), 1971, 1975, 1978, and 1989 (at which point the leading role of the Communist Party was abolished). It was amended several more times during 1990–1992 (for example, 1990, name change to Czecho-Slovakia, 1991 incorporation of the human rights charter)

=== Heads of state and government ===
- List of presidents of Czechoslovakia
- List of prime ministers of Czechoslovakia

=== Foreign policy ===
==== International agreements and membership ====
In the 1930s, the nation formed a military alliance with France, which collapsed in the Munich Agreement of 1938. After World War II, an active participant in Council for Mutual Economic Assistance (Comecon), Warsaw Pact, United Nations and its specialized agencies; signatory of conference on Security and Cooperation in Europe.

==== International relations ====
Between 1948 and 1949, Czechoslovakia formed a relationship with Israel through their military support during the War of 1948. Israel bought approximately US$144 million worth of weapons and ammunition.

=== Administrative divisions ===
- 1918–1923: Different systems in former Austrian territory (Bohemia, Moravia, a small part of Silesia) compared to former Hungarian territory (Slovakia and Ruthenia): three lands (země) (also called district units (kraje)): Bohemia, Moravia, Silesia, plus 21 counties (župy) in today's Slovakia and three counties in today's Ruthenia; both lands and counties were divided into districts (okresy).
- 1923–1927: As above, except that the Slovak and Ruthenian counties were replaced by six (grand) counties ((veľ)župy) in Slovakia and one (grand) county in Ruthenia, and the numbers and boundaries of the okresy were changed in those two territories.
- 1928–1938: Four lands (Czech: země, Slovak: krajiny): Bohemia, Moravia-Silesia, Slovakia and Sub-Carpathian Ruthenia, divided into districts (okresy).
- Late 1938 – March 1939: As above, but Slovakia and Ruthenia gained the status of "autonomous lands." Slovakia was called Slovenský štát, with its own currency and government.
- 1945–1948: As in 1928–1938, except that Ruthenia became part of the Soviet Union.
- 1949–1960: 19 regions (kraje) divided into 270 okresy.
- 1960–1992: 10 kraje, Prague, and (from 1970) Bratislava (capital of Slovakia); these were divided into 109–114 okresy; the kraje were abolished temporarily in Slovakia in 1969–1970 and for many purposes from 1991 in Czechoslovakia; in addition, the Czech Socialist Republic and the Slovak Socialist Republic were established in 1969 (without the word Socialist from 1990).

== Economy ==
Before World War II, the economy was about the fourth in all industrial countries in Europe.The state was based on strong economy, manufacturing cars (Škoda, Tatra), trams, aircraft (Aero, Avia), ships, ship engines (Škoda), cannons, shoes (Baťa), turbines, guns (Zbrojovka Brno). It was the industrial workshop for the Austro-Hungarian empire. The Slovak lands relied more heavily on agriculture than the Czech lands.

After World War II, the economy was centrally planned, with command links controlled by the communist party, similarly to the Soviet Union. The large metallurgical industry was dependent on imports of iron and non-ferrous ores.

- Industry: Extractive industry and manufacturing dominated the sector, including machinery, chemicals, food processing, metallurgy, and textiles. The sector was wasteful in its use of energy, materials, and labor and was slow to upgrade technology, but the country was a major supplier of high-quality machinery, instruments, electronics, aircraft, airplane engines and arms to other socialist countries.
- Agriculture: Agriculture was a minor sector, but collectivized farms of large acreage and relatively efficient mode of production enabled the country to be relatively self-sufficient in the food supply. The country depended on imports of grains (mainly for livestock feed) in years of adverse weather. Meat production was constrained by a shortage of feed, but the country still recorded high per capita consumption of meat.
- Foreign Trade: Exports were estimated at US$17.8 billion in 1985. Exports were machinery (55%), fuel and materials (14%), and manufactured consumer goods (16%). Imports stood at an estimated US$17.9 billion in 1985, including fuel and materials (41%), machinery (33%), and agricultural and forestry products (12%). In 1986, about 80% of foreign trade was with other socialist countries.
- Exchange rate: Official, or commercial, the rate was crowns (Kčs) 5.4 per US$1 in 1987. Tourist, or non-commercial, the rate was Kčs 10.5 per US$1. Neither rate reflected purchasing power. The exchange rate on the black market was around Kčs 30 per US$1, which became the official rate once the currency became convertible in the early 1990s.
- Fiscal year: Calendar year.
- Fiscal policy: The state was the exclusive owner of means of production in most cases. Revenue from state enterprises was the primary source of revenues followed by turnover tax. The government spent heavily on social programs, subsidies, and investment. The budget was usually balanced or left a small surplus.

== Resource base ==
After World War II, the country was short of energy, relying on imported crude oil and natural gas from the Soviet Union, domestic brown coal, and nuclear and hydroelectric energy. Energy constraints were a major factor in the 1980s.

== Transport and communications ==
Slightly after the foundation of Czechoslovakia in 1918, there was a lack of essential infrastructure in many areas – paved roads, railways, bridges, etc. Massive improvement in the following years enabled Czechoslovakia to develop its industry. Prague's civil airport in Ruzyně became one of the most modern terminals in the world when it was finished in 1937. Tomáš Baťa, a Czech entrepreneur and visionary, outlined his ideas in the publication "Budujme stát pro 40 milionů lidí," where he described the future motorway system. Construction of the first motorways in Czechoslovakia begun in 1939, nevertheless, they were stopped after German occupation during World War II.

== Education ==
Education was free at all levels and compulsory from ages 6 to 15. The vast majority of the population was literate. There was a highly developed system of apprenticeship training and vocational schools supplemented general secondary schools and institutions of higher education.

== Religion ==
In 1991, 46% of the population were Roman Catholics, 5.3% were Evangelical Lutheran, 30% were Atheist, and other religions made up 17% of the country, but there were huge differences in religious practices between the two constituent republics; see Czech Republic and Slovakia.

== Health, social welfare and housing ==
After World War II, free health care was available to all citizens. National health planning emphasized preventive medicine; factory and local health care centres supplemented hospitals and other inpatient institutions. There was a substantial improvement in rural health care during the 1960s and 1970s.

== Mass media ==
During the era between the World Wars, Czechoslovak democracy and liberalism facilitated conditions for free publication. The most significant daily newspapers in these times were Lidové noviny, Národní listy, Český deník and Československá Republika.

During Communist rule, the mass media in Czechoslovakia were controlled by the Communist party. Private ownership of any publication or agency of the mass media was generally forbidden, although churches and other organizations published small periodicals and newspapers. Even with this information monopoly in the hands of organizations under KSČ control, all publications were reviewed by the government's Office for Press and Information.

== Sports ==
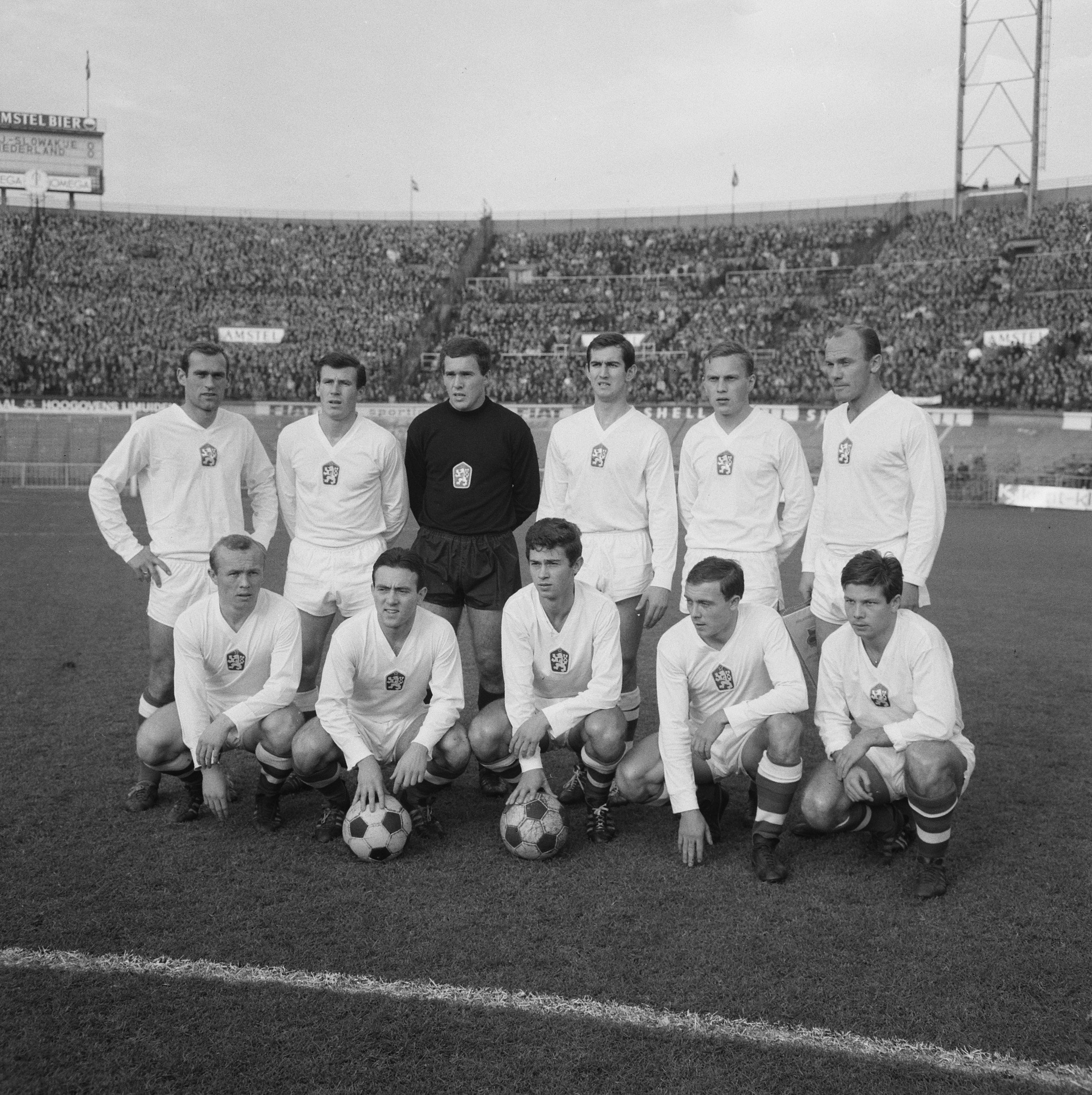
Czechoslovak national football team in 1966

The Czechoslovakia national football team was a consistent performer on the international scene, with eight appearances in the FIFA World Cup Finals, finishing in second place in 1934 and 1962. The team also won the European Football Championship in 1976, came in third in 1980, and won the Olympic gold in 1980.

Well-known football players such as Jan Koller, Pavel Nedvěd, Antonín Panenka, Milan Baroš, Tomáš Rosický, Vladimír Šmicer, Petr Čech, Ladislav Petráš, Marián Masný, Ján Pivarník, Ján Mucha, Róbert Vittek, Peter Pekarík, and Marek Hamšík were all born in Czechoslovakia.

The International Olympic Committee code for Czechoslovakia is TCH, which is still used in historical listings of results.

The Czechoslovak national ice hockey team won many medals from the world championships and Olympic Games. Peter Šťastný, Jaromír Jágr, Dominik Hašek, Peter Bondra, Petr Klíma, Marián Gáborík, Marián Hossa, Miroslav Šatan and Pavol Demitra all come from Czechoslovakia.

Emil Zátopek, winner of four Olympic gold medals in athletics, is considered one of the top athletes in Czechoslovak history.

Věra Čáslavská was an Olympic gold medallist in gymnastics, winning seven gold medals and four silver medals. She represented Czechoslovakia in three consecutive Olympics.

Several accomplished professional tennis players including Jaroslav Drobný, Ivan Lendl, Jan Kodeš, Miloslav Mečíř, Hana Mandlíková, Martina Hingis, Martina Navratilova, Jana Novotná, Petra Kvitová, Daniela Hantuchová, Barbora Krejčíková, Markéta Vondroušová and Karolína Muchová were born in Czechoslovakia (or what became the Czech Republic in 1993).

== Culture ==
- Czech Republic / Slovakia
- List of Czechs / List of Slovaks
- MDŽ (International Women's Day)
- Jazz in dissident Czechoslovakia

== Postage stamps ==
- Postage stamps and postal history of Czechoslovakia
- Czechoslovakia stamp reused by Slovak Republic after 18 January 1939 by overprinting country and value

== See also ==
- Effects on the environment in Czechoslovakia from Soviet influence during the Cold War
- Former countries in Europe after 1815
- List of former sovereign states
- Operation Barium
