= Czechoslovak Constitution of 1920 =

Fundamental law of Czechoslovakia from 1920 to 1948

Constitution of the Czechoslovak Republic
- Created: 29 February 1920
- Ratified: March 6
- Date effective: March 6
- Repealed: 9 May 1948
- Author: Revolutionary National Assembly
- Signatories: Government: Tomáš Garrigue Masaryk; Vlastimil Tusar (ČSSD); František Staněk (RSZML); Fedor Houdek (SNaRS); Edvard Beneš; Václav Klofáč (ČSNS); Kuneš Sonntag (RSZML); Gustav Heidler (ČSNS); Gustav Habrman (ČSSD); Lev Winter (ČSSD); Karel Prášek (RSZML); Emil Franke (ČSNS); František Veselý (ČSNS); Antonín Hampl (ČSSD)

Full text
- Constitution of the Czechoslovak Republic (1920) at Wikisource

The Czechoslovak Constitution of 1920 was the first permanent constitution of Czechoslovakia. Ratified after World War I, the constitution established Czechoslovakia as a democratic republic. It was adopted by the National Assembly on 29 February 1920 and replaced the provisional constitution adopted on 13 November 1918.

The constitution, modelled after constitutions of established democracies, was conceived in the light of Hans Kelsen's contribution to constitutional law. The system of government the constitution introduced made Czechoslovakia the most westernized of all of the central and eastern European nations on the verge of World War II.

The constitution created a parliament but also a president and cabinet, sharing powers of executive branch. Beneath them was a judiciary that was advanced with many levels of courts delegated for various types of cases.

== Parliamentary democracy ==
The parliament, the National Assembly, was bicameral. The Chamber of Deputies consisted of 300 members elected for six years. The Senate consisted of 150 members elected for eight years. Suffrage was exercised by all citizens, of both sexes, over the age of 21 for elections to the lower chamber; and over the age of 26 for elections to the senate. Candidates for the lower chamber had to be at least 30 years of age; and for the senate, at least 45 years of age.

The parliamentary system that was installed created a complicated system of proportional representation, with relatively few constituents for each representative. It was possible to get a seat with as little as 2.6 percent of the vote. This allowed for a great variety of political parties to emerge, with no clear front runner or leading political entity. A typical Chamber of Deputies during the First Republic had well over 10 factions represented. With so many parties as part of the national forum, it was all but impossible for one party to win the 151 seats needed for a majority. No party came close to being able to govern alone until the Communist Party was able to secure 38% percent of the votes in 1946; before then, no party won more than 25 percent of the vote.

Since it was so hard to secure a majority, the government was at times stalled out and unable to effectively legislate. Under the circumstances, Czechoslovak prime ministers were fairly weak figures compared to their counterparts in the rest of Europe. In most cases, the prime minister was more the chairman of the cabinet than its leader.

If parliament rejected a government bill, the cabinet could unanimously refer the proposed law to referendum. No recourse was made to this constitutional provision during the First Republic.

== Presidency ==
The president was elected by both chambers of parliament in joint session (acting in accordance with the standing orders of the lower chamber). The presidential term was seven years, with no more than two in a row (the first president was exempted from this provision). Candidates for the presidency had to be at least 35 years old. The framers intended for the prime minister and cabinet to hold the real power. Hence, the constitutional powers of the president were limited. However, the personal prestige of the first two presidents, Tomáš Masaryk and Edvard Beneš, and the instability of successive governments (for example, Masaryk's presidency saw 10 cabinets headed by nine statesmen) meant that the president wielded in practice more authority than the plain text of the constitution suggested. The constitution laid down that all executive functions rested with the government except as expressly assigned to the president. However, the president could address written or verbal messages to parliament, appoint and dismiss ministers, attend and preside over cabinet meetings, and demand written reports from individual ministers. Hence, presidential influence on the executive was in practice considerable.

The president concluded and ratified international treaties, saving that treaties imposing personal or military burdens upon the subject or involving territorial changes required parliamentary consent.

The president could veto bills by sending them back to parliament, with accompanying observations. Parliament in turn had the right to override the veto with a simple majority of both houses. If the Senate sustained the veto, then the Chamber of Deputies could override it unilaterally by a subsequent vote by means of a three-fifths majority.

The president was army's commander-in-chief, with the power to appoint all high-ranking officers. He also had the right to appoint university professors, judges and senior civil servants.

Whenever the presidency was vacant, most of its functions were assumed by the prime minister.

== Regional autonomy ==
In order to satisfy the protection of national minorities required by the Treaty of Saint-Germain-en-Laye, the constitution referred explicitly to the terms of the treaty.

=== Carpathian Ruthenia ===
Carpathian Ruthenia had been formally included within the Czecho-Slovak state from 1919. The 1920 constitution provided for the autonomy of the territory. However, these provisions remained a dead letter in practice, as the supposedly autonomous institutions were controlled from Prague.

=== Language law ===
A constitutional act was adopted alongside the constitution on the same day, and was considered one of the constitutional texts. It established the "Czechoslovak language" (i.e. Czech and Slovak considered as two official dialects of one language) as an official language, but also granted status to minority languages in areas where at least 20% of the citizens spoke such a language. In reality, areas were heavily gerrymandered to prevent this from ever being invoked.

== Development of the constitution ==
The Constitution of 1920 would serve as the guiding document for the government of Czechoslovakia until World War II. And even after Czechoslovakia came under the control of the Soviet Union, the constitution would still continue to govern the way the state’s internal affairs by serving as the underlying example for the country’s next constitution, with provisions being made for a separate and more localized Slovak government. These local governments from that point forward would control Slovakia, with the government established by the constitution ruling over the more basic common matters as well as the Czech half of the nation.

The 1920 constitution was replaced on 9 May 1948 by the Ninth-of-May Constitution, following the Communist takeover in February 1948.

== Bibliography ==
- A History of the Czechs and Slovaks, RW Seton-Watson, London, 1943
- Taborsky, Ed. 1944. Czechoslovakia’s Experience with P.R. Journal of Comparative Legislation and International Law, vol. 26: 49-51. https://jstor.org/ (accessed September 9, 2007).
- Skilling, H. Gordon. 1952. The Czechoslovak Constitutional System: The Soviet Impact. Political Science Quarterly, vol. 67: 198-224. https://jstor.org/ (accessed September 9, 2007).
- Taborsky Ed. 1955. The Administration of Justice in a People’s Democracy. The American Political Science Review, vol. 49: 402-415. https://jstor.org/ (accessed September 9, 2007).
- Grzybowski, Kazimierz. 1957. Continuity of Law in Eastern Europe. The American Journal of Comparative Law, vol. 6: 47-78. https://jstor.org/ (accessed September 9, 2007).
