= List of members of the National Assembly of Czechoslovakia (1920–1925) =

The members of the National Assembly of Czechoslovakia from 1920 to 1925 were elected in April 1920. Members of the Chamber of Deputies were elected on 18 April and members of the Senate on 25 April.

== Chamber of Deputies ==
Member	Party
Josef Adámek	Czechoslovak People's Party
Antonín Adamovský	Czechoslovak People's Party
Karel Anděl	Czechoslovak Traders' Party
Jaroslav Aster	Czechoslovak Social Democratic Party
Alois Baeran	German National Party
Václav Barták	Czechoslovak Social Democratic Party
Theodor Bartošek	Czechoslovak Socialist Party
Bohdan Bečka	Czechoslovak National Democracy
Ján Bečko	Czechoslovak Social Democratic Party
Rudolf Bechyně	Czechoslovak Social Democratic Party
Ferdinand Benda	Czechoslovak Social Democratic Party
Edvard Beneš	Czechoslovak Socialist Party
Rudolf Beran	Republican Party of Farmers and Peasants
Hugo Bergmann	Czechoslovak Socialist Party
Rudolf Bergman	Czechoslovak National Democracy
Franz Beutel	German Social Democratic Workers' Party
Bedřich Bezděk	Czechoslovak People's Party
František Biňovec	Czechoslovak Social Democratic Party
Pavel Blaho	Republican Party of Farmers and Peasants
Fanni Blatny	German Social Democratic Workers' Party
Jaroslav Blažek	Czechoslovak Social Democratic Party
Bedřich Bobek	Republican Party of Farmers and Peasants
Emil Bobek	German Christian Social People's Party
Arnold Bobok	Czechoslovak People's Party
Josef Böhr	German Christian Social People's Party
Georg Böllmann	Farmers' League
Géza Borovszky	Czechoslovak Social Democratic Party
Ján Botto	Republican Party of Farmers and Peasants
Bohumír Bradáč	Republican Party of Farmers and Peasants
Jozef Branecký	Republican Party of Farmers and Peasants
Vilém Brodecký	Czechoslovak Social Democratic Party
Karel Brožík	Czechoslovak Social Democratic Party
Heinrich Brunar	German National Party
Josef Bubník	Czechoslovak Social Democratic Party
Jozef Buday	Czechoslovak People's Party
Franz Budig	German Christian Social People's Party
Edmund Burian	Czechoslovak Social Democratic Party
František Buříval	Czechoslovak Socialist Party
Ludwig Czech	German Social Democratic Workers' Party
Karl Čermak	German Social Democratic Workers' Party
Antonín Černý	Czechoslovak Social Democratic Party
Jan Černý	Republican Party of Farmers and Peasants
Jan Černý	Czechoslovak Social Democratic Party
Josef Černý	Republican Party of Farmers and Peasants
Vincenc Čundrlík	Czechoslovak Social Democratic Party
Antonín Čuřík	Czechoslovak People's Party
Štefan Darula	Czechoslovak Social Democratic Party
Josef David	Czechoslovak Socialist Party
Jindřich Daxer	Provincial Christian-Socialist Party
Ivan Dérer	Czechoslovak Social Democratic Party
Marie Deutsch	German Social Democratic Workers' Party
Anton Dietl	German Social Democratic Workers' Party
Josef Dolanský	Czechoslovak People's Party
Václav Draxl	Czechoslovak Socialist Party
Vladimír Drobný	Czechoslovak Socialist Party
Jan Dubický	Republican Party of Farmers and Peasants
Viktor Dyk	Czechoslovak National Democracy
Karel Engliš	Czechoslovak National Democracy
Daniel Ertl	Czechoslovak Social Democratic Party
Róbert Farbula	Czechoslovak Social Democratic Party
Štefan Feczko	Czechoslovak Social Democratic Party
Wenzel Feierfeil	German Christian Social People's Party
Edwin Feyerfeil	German National Party
Josef Fischer	Farmers' League
Rudolf Fischer	German Social Democratic Workers' Party
József Földessy	Hungarian-German Social Democratic Party
Emil Franke	Czechoslovak Socialist Party
Kálmán Füssy	Provincial Christian-Socialist Party
Andrej Gagatko	Czechoslovak Socialist Party
József Gáti	Communist Party of Czechoslovakia
Marek Gažík	Czechoslovak People's Party
František Geršl	Czechoslovak Social Democratic Party
Ernst Grünzner	German Social Democratic Workers' Party
Viktor Haas	German Social Democratic Workers' Party
Gustav Habrman	Czechoslovak Social Democratic Party
Theodor Hackenberg	German Social Democratic Workers' Party
Otto Hahn	German Social Democratic Workers' Party
Antonín Hajn	Czechoslovak National Democracy
Josef Haken	Czechoslovak Social Democratic Party
Ivan Hálek	Republican Party of Farmers and Peasants
Jaroslav Hálek	Republican Party of Farmers and Peasants
Antonín Hampl	Czechoslovak Social Democratic Party
Anton Hancko	Czechoslovak People's Party
Georg Hanreich	Farmers' League
Jakub Haupt	Republican Party of Farmers and Peasants
Wilhelm Häusler	German Social Democratic Workers' Party
Eduard Hausmann	German Social Democratic Workers' Party
Rudolf Heeger	German Social Democratic Workers' Party
Franz Heller	Farmers' League
Oswald Hillebrand	German Social Democratic Workers' Party
Ernst Hirsch	German Social Democratic Workers' Party
František Hlaváček	Czechoslovak Social Democratic Party
Andrej Hlinka	Czechoslovak People's Party
František Hnídek	Republican Party of Farmers and Peasants
Milan Hodža	Republican Party of Farmers and Peasants
Max Hoffmann	German Social Democratic Workers' Party
Arnold Holitscher	German Social Democratic Workers' Party
František Horák	Czechoslovak Traders' Party
František Houser	Czechoslovak Social Democratic Party
Jan Hrizbyl	Czechoslovak Socialist Party
Mořic Hruban	Czechoslovak People's Party
Igor Hrušovský	Czechoslovak Socialist Party
Josef Hudec	Socialist Party of the Czechoslovak Working People
František Hummelhans	Czechoslovak Social Democratic Party
Andrej Hvizdák	Czechoslovak Social Democratic Party
Albín Chalupa	Czechoslovak Social Democratic Party
Rudolf Chalupa	Czechoslovak Social Democratic Party
Josef Chalupník	Czechoslovak Social Democratic Party
Vincenc Charvát	Czechoslovak Social Democratic Party
Anna Chlebounová	Republican Party of Farmers and Peasants
Johann Jabloniczky	Provincial Christian-Socialist Party
František Janalík	Czechoslovak People's Party
Ján Janček	Republican Party of Farmers and Peasants
Václav Jaša	Czechoslovak Social Democratic Party
František Ježek	Czechoslovak Socialist Party
Václav Johanis	Czechoslovak Social Democratic Party
Julius John	German Social Democratic Workers' Party
Hans Jokl	German Social Democratic Workers' Party
Rudolf Jung	German National Socialist Workers' Party
Ferdiš Juriga	Czechoslovak People's Party
Alois Kaderka	Czechoslovak People's Party
Bruno Kafka	German Democratic Freedom Party
Leonhard Kaiser	Farmers' League
Othmar Kallina	German National Party
Jan Kamelský	Czechoslovak National Democracy
Josef Kaminský	Republican Party of Farmers and Peasants
Michal Karlovský	Republican Party of Farmers and Peasants
Betty Karpíšková	Czechoslovak Social Democratic Party
Emil Kasík	Czechoslovak Social Democratic Party
Franz Kaufmann	German Social Democratic Workers' Party
Josef Keibl	German National Party
Irene Kirpal	German Social Democratic Workers' Party
Robert Klein	Czechoslovak Social Democratic Party
Bohuslav Klimo	Republican Party of Farmers and Peasants
Karol Kmeťko	Czechoslovak People's Party
Josef Knejzlík	Czechoslovak Socialist Party
Hans Knirsch	German National Socialist Workers' Party
Josef Konečný	Czechoslovak Social Democratic Party
František Kopřiva	Czechoslovak People's Party
Endre Korláth	Independent
Lajos Körmendy-Ékes	Provincial Christian-Socialist Party
Karl Kostka	German Democratic Freedom Party
Václav Košek	Czechoslovak People's Party
Jan Koudelka	Czechoslovak Social Democratic Party
Tomáš Koutný	Czechoslovak Social Democratic Party
Desider Kovačič	Czechoslovak Social Democratic Party
Karel Kramář	Czechoslovak National Democracy
Vinzenz Kraus	German National Party
Karl KreibichKarl Kreibich	German Social Democratic Workers' Party
Juraj Krejčí	Czechoslovak Social Democratic Party
Adolf Křemen	Republican Party of Farmers and Peasants
Franz Křepek	Farmers' League
Alois Kříž	Czechoslovak Social Democratic Party
Josef Kříž	Czechoslovak Social Democratic Party
Andrej Kubál	Czechoslovak Social Democratic Party
Josef Kubíček	Republican Party of Farmers and Peasants
Robert Kubiš	Slovak People's Party
Ladislav Kučera	Czechoslovak Social Democratic Party
Robert Kunst	Czechoslovak Social Democratic Party
Ivan Kurťak	Independent
Ľudovít Labaj	Czechoslovak People's Party
Luisa Landová-Štychová	Czechoslovak Socialist Party
František Langr	Czechoslovak Socialist Party
Rudolf Laube	Czechoslovak Socialist Party
Wenzel Lehnert	German National Party
Emanuel Lehocký	Czechoslovak Social Democratic Party
Dominik Leibl	German Social Democratic Workers' Party
Jenö Lelley	Provincial Christian-Socialist Party
Rudolf Lodgman	German National Party
Eduard Löwa	German Social Democratic Workers' Party
František Lukavský	Czechoslovak National Democracy
Felix Luschka	German Christian Social People's Party
Jakub Mach	Republican Party of Farmers and Peasants
Anna Malá	Czechoslovak Social Democratic Party
Rudolf Malík	Republican Party of Farmers and Peasants
Jan Malypetr	Republican Party of Farmers and Peasants
Jaroslav Marek	Czechoslovak Social Democratic Party
Vinzenz Mark	German Christian Social People's Party
Ivan Markovič	Czechoslovak Social Democratic Party
František Mašata	Republican Party of Farmers and Peasants
František Mašek	Czechoslovak National Democracy
Josef Matoušek	Czechoslovak National Democracy
Franz Matzner	German National Party
Ján Maxian	Czechoslovak Social Democratic Party
Josef Mayer	Farmers' League
Samu Mayer	Hungarian-German Social Democratic Party
Gustav Mazanec	Czechoslovak People's Party
Wilhelm Medinger	German National Party
Ľudovít Medvecký	Republican Party of Farmers and Peasants
Alfréd Meissner	Czechoslovak Social Democratic Party
Rudolf Merta	Czechoslovak Social Democratic Party
Vince Mikle	Independent
Václav Mikuláš	Czechoslovak Socialist Party
Vítězslav Mikulíček	Czechoslovak Social Democratic Party
Rudolf Mlčoch	Czechoslovak Traders' Party
František Modráček	Socialist Party of the Czechoslovak Working People
František Molík	Republican Party of Farmers and Peasants
Ivan Mondok	Communist Party of Czechoslovakia
Karel Moudrý	Czechoslovak Socialist Party
Václav Myslivec	Czechoslovak People's Party
Gyula Nagy	Hungarian-German Social Democratic Party
Josef Václav Najman	Czechoslovak Traders' Party
František Navrátil	Czechoslovak People's Party
Gustav Navrátil	Czechoslovak National Democracy
Jaromír Nečas	Czechoslovak Social Democratic Party
Dominik Nejezchleb-Marcha	Republican Party of Farmers and Peasants
Antonín Němec	Czechoslovak Social Democratic Party
Josef Netolický	Czechoslovak Socialist Party
František Nosek	Czechoslovak People's Party
Antonín Novák	Czechoslovak Social Democratic Party
Ladislav Novák	Czechoslovak National Democracy
Jozef Oktávec	Czechoslovak Social Democratic Party
Štefan Onderčo	Czechoslovak People's Party
Martin Oríšek	Republican Party of Farmers and Peasants
Jozef Pajger	Czechoslovak Social Democratic Party
Viktor Palkovich	Provincial Christian-Socialist Party
Franz Pallauf	German Social Democratic Workers' Party
Franz Palme	German Social Democratic Workers' Party
Josef Pastyřík	Czechoslovak Traders' Party
Josef Patejdl	Czechoslovak Socialist Party
Josef Patzel	German National Socialist Workers' Party
Ludmila Pechmanová-Klosová	Czechoslovak Socialist Party
Jan Pelikán	Czechoslovak Socialist Party
Jan Pěnkava	Czechoslovak People's Party
Karl Petersilka	German Christian Social People's Party
František Petrovický	Czechoslovak National Democracy
Luděk Pik	Czechoslovak Social Democratic Party
Franz Pittinger	Farmers' League
Johann Platzer	Farmers' League
Ján Pocisk	Czechoslovak Social Democratic Party
Otilie Podzimková	Czechoslovak Socialist Party
Adolf Pohl	German Social Democratic Workers' Party
Ferdinand Prášek	Czechoslovak Socialist Party
Jan Prokeš	Czechoslovak Social Democratic Party
Adolf Prokůpek	Republican Party of Farmers and Peasants
Josef Pšenička	Czechoslovak Socialist Party
Eliška Purkyňová	Czechoslovak National Democracy
Emmerich Radda	German National Party
Alois Rašín	Czechoslovak National Democracy
Antonín Remeš	Czechoslovak Social Democratic Party
Anton Roscher	German Social Democratic Workers' Party
Josefa Rosolová	Czechoslovak National Democracy
Franz Röttel	Farmers' League
Jaroslav Rouček	Czechoslovak Social Democratic Party
Alois Roudnický	Czechoslovak People's Party
Augusta Rozsypalová	Czechoslovak People's Party
Michael Rustler	German Christian Social People's Party
Jaroslav Rychtera	Republican Party of Farmers and Peasants
Jan Rýpar	Czechoslovak People's Party
Josef Sajdl	Czechoslovak Socialist Party
František Samek	Czechoslovak National Democracy
Alois Sauer	Farmers' League
Václav Sedláček	Czechoslovak People's Party
Nikolaj Sedorjak	Communist Party of Czechoslovakia
Josef Seliger	German Social Democratic Workers' Party
Anton Schäfer	German Social Democratic Workers' Party
Robert Schälzky	German Christian Social People's Party
Georg Scharnagl	German Christian Social People's Party
Rudolf Schiller	German Social Democratic Workers' Party
Ernst Schollich	German National Party
Ottokar Schubert	Farmers' League
Karl Schuster	German Social Democratic Workers' Party
Josef Schweichhart	German Social Democratic Workers' Party
Hugo Simm	German National Socialist Workers' Party
František Sís	Czechoslovak National Democracy
Jozef Sivák	Slovak People's Party
Josef Skalák	Czechoslovak Social Democratic Party
Františka Skaunicová	Czechoslovak Social Democratic Party
Jozef Skotek	Czechoslovak Social Democratic Party
Václav Sladký	Czechoslovak Socialist Party
Jan Slavíček	Czechoslovak Socialist Party
Kuneš Sonntag	Republican Party of Farmers and Peasants
Juraj Sopko	Republican Party of Farmers and Peasants
Franz Spina	Farmers' League
Antonín Srba	Czechoslovak Social Democratic Party
Otakar Srdínko	Republican Party of Farmers and Peasants
František Staněk	Republican Party of Farmers and Peasants
Jaroslav Stejskal	Socialist Party of the Czechoslovak Working People
Alois Stenzl	Independent
Josef Stivín	Czechoslovak Social Democratic Party
Kornel Stodola	Republican Party of Farmers and Peasants
Viktor Stoupal	Republican Party of Farmers and Peasants
Jaroslav Stránský	Czechoslovak National Democracy
Jiří Stříbrný	Czechoslovak Socialist Party
Lájos Surányi	Czechoslovak Social Democratic Party
Karol Svetlík	Czechoslovak Social Democratic Party
František Světlík	Czechoslovak People's Party
František Svoboda	Czechoslovak Social Democratic Party
Cyril Svozil	Czechoslovak National Democracy
Anna Sychravová	Czechoslovak Social Democratic Party
József Szentiványi	Provincial Christian-Socialist Party
Emanuel Šafranko	Communist Party of Czechoslovakia
Josef Šamalík	Czechoslovak People's Party
Vasil Ščerecký	Republican Party of Farmers and Peasants
Bohumír Šmeral	Czechoslovak Social Democratic Party
Jaromír Špaček	Czechoslovak National Democracy
Emil Špatný	Czechoslovak Socialist Party
Jan Šrámek	Czechoslovak People's Party
Vavro Šrobár	Republican Party of Farmers and Peasants
Václav Štolba	Republican Party of Farmers and Peasants
Antonín Švehla	Republican Party of Farmers and Peasants
Štefan Tadlánek	Czechoslovak Social Democratic Party
Siegfried Taub	German Social Democratic Workers' Party
Heřman Tausik	Czechoslovak Social Democratic Party
Rudolf Tayerlé	Czechoslovak Social Democratic Party
Josef Teska	Czechoslovak Social Democratic Party
János Tobler	Provincial Christian-Socialist Party
Florian Tománek	Czechoslovak People's Party
František Tomášek	Czechoslovak Social Democratic Party
Michal Tomik	Czechoslovak People's Party
František Toužil	Czechoslovak Social Democratic Party
Jindřich Trnobranský	Czechoslovak Socialist Party
Alois Tučný	Czechoslovak Socialist Party
Jan Tůma	Republican Party of Farmers and Peasants
Vlastimil Tusar	Czechoslovak Social Democratic Party
František Udržal	Republican Party of Farmers and Peasants
Johann Uhl	German Social Democratic Workers' Party
Antonín Uhlíř	Czechoslovak Socialist Party
Josef Ulrich	Czechoslovak Social Democratic Party
Simeon Vacula	Republican Party of Farmers and Peasants
Antonín Vahala	Republican Party of Farmers and Peasants
Jan Valášek	Republican Party of Farmers and Peasants
Ján Vanovič	Republican Party of Farmers and Peasants
František Vápeník	Czechoslovak Socialist Party
Václav Vávra	Czechoslovak Traders' Party
Václav Veverka	Czechoslovak National Democracy
Vilém Votruba	Czechoslovak National Democracy
Jozef Vrabec	Czechoslovak People's Party
Josef Vraný	Republican Party of Farmers and Peasants
Bohuslav Vrbenský	Czechoslovak Socialist Party
Ján Vyparina	Czechoslovak Social Democratic Party
Franz Warmbrunn	German Social Democratic Workers' Party
Leo Wenzel	German National Socialist Workers' Party
Franz Windirsch	Farmers' League
Lev Winter	Czechoslovak Social Democratic Party
Paul Wittich	Hungarian-German Social Democratic Party
Jan Záhorský	Czechoslovak Socialist Party
Milo Záruba	Czechoslovak People's Party
František Zavřel	Czechoslovak National Democracy
Františka Zeminová	Czechoslovak Socialist Party
Wolfgang Zierhut	Farmers' League
Ján Zverec	Czechoslovak Social Democratic Party

== Senate ==
Member	Party
Josef Ackermann	Czechoslovak Social Democratic Party
Juraj Babka	Czechoslovak Social Democratic Party
Jozef Barinka	Slovak People's Party
Josef Barth	German Social Democratic Workers' Party
Ján Blaho	Czechoslovak Social Democratic Party
Ivan Bodnár	Communist Party of Czechoslovakia
Jaroslav Brabec	Czechoslovak National Democracy
Karel Cífka	Czechoslovak Social Democratic Party
Petr Cingr	Czechoslovak Social Democratic Party
Endre Csehy	Communist Party of Czechoslovakia
Felix Časný	Czechoslovak Social Democratic Party
Samo Daxner	Republican Party of Farmers and Peasants
Karel Dědic	Czechoslovak Social Democratic Party
Václav Donát	Republican Party of Farmers and Peasants
Alexander Dráb	Czechoslovak Social Democratic Party
Ján Duchaj	Republican Party of Farmers and Peasants
Matúš Dula	Czechoslovak National Democracy
Juraj Ďurčanský	Czechoslovak People's Party
Božena Ecksteinová	Czechoslovak Social Democratic Party
Ferenc Egry	Independent
Karol Endlicher	Czechoslovak Social Democratic Party
Heinrich Fritsch	Farmers' League
Vladimír Fáček	Czechoslovak National Democracy
Adam Fahrner	German National Socialist Workers' Party
József Ficza	National Hungarian Small Farmers and Farmers Party
Jan Filipinský	Czechoslovak Social Democratic Party
Karel Folber	Czechoslovak Social Democratic Party
Paul Franke	Farmers' League
Bohuslav Franta	Czechoslovak National Democracy
Albert Friedrich	German Social Democratic Workers' Party
Karl Friedrich	German National Party
István Hangos	Provincial Christian-Socialist Party
Hans Hartl	German National Party
Jáchym Havlena	Czechoslovak Social Democratic Party
Jan Havránek	Czechoslovak Social Democratic Party
August Hecker	German Social Democratic Workers' Party
Karl Heller	German Social Democratic Workers' Party
Jan Herben	Czechoslovak National Democracy
Emma Maria Herzig	German National Party
Karl Hilgenreiner	German Christian Social People's Party
Hermann Hladik	German Social Democratic Workers' Party
Antonín Hnátek	Czechoslovak Social Democratic Party
Josef Holý	Czechoslovak Socialist Party
Cyril Horáček	Republican Party of Farmers and Peasants
Alois Horák	Czechoslovak People's Party
Otmar Hrejsa	Republican Party of Farmers and Peasants
Emanuel Hrubý	Republican Party of Farmers and Peasants
Josef Hucl	Republican Party of Farmers and Peasants
Ignaz Hübner	Farmers' League
Josef Hybeš	Czechoslovak Social Democratic Party
František Hybš	Republican Party of Farmers and Peasants
Josef Hyrš	Republican Party of Farmers and Peasants
Václav Chlumecký	Czechoslovak Social Democratic Party
Jozef Cholek	Czechoslovak Social Democratic Party
Bohumil Jakubka	Czechoslovak Social Democratic Party
Anton Jarolim	German Social Democratic Workers' Party
Rudolf Jaroš	Czechoslovak Social Democratic Party
Josef Jelinek	German National Socialist Workers' Party
Franz Jesser	German National Socialist Workers' Party
Jan Jílek	Czechoslovak People's Party
Alois Jirásek	Czechoslovak National Democracy
Ferdinand Jirásek	Czechoslovak Social Democratic Party
Štefan Kada	Czechoslovak Social Democratic Party
Josef Kadlčák	Czechoslovak People's Party
Josef Karas	Czechoslovak People's Party
Wilhelm Kiesewetter	German Social Democratic Workers' Party
Josef Klečák	Czechoslovak Socialist Party
Július Klimko	Czechoslovak People's Party
Václav Klofáč	Czechoslovak Socialist Party
Antonín Klouda	Czechoslovak Socialist Party
Heinrich Knesch	Farmers' League
Ferenc Koperniczky	Independent
Alois Konečný	Czechoslovak Socialist Party
Jan Kotrba	Czechoslovak Traders' Party
Bohuslav Koukal	Czechoslovak People's Party
Josef Kouša	Czechoslovak Social Democratic Party
Ján Kovalik	Czechoslovak People's Party
František Krejčí	Czechoslovak Socialist Party
Matthias Krepenhofer	Hungarian-German Social Democratic Party
Milutin Križko	Republican Party of Farmers and Peasants
František Kroiher	Republican Party of Farmers and Peasants
Otakar Krouský	Czechoslovak Socialist Party
Luděk Krupka	Czechoslovak People's Party
Jurko Lažo	Czechoslovak Social Democratic Party
Eugen Ledebur-Wicheln	German Christian Social People's Party
Franz Link	German Social Democratic Workers' Party
Andreas Lippert	Farmers' League
Čeněk Josef Lisý	Czechoslovak Socialist Party
Dominik Löw	German Social Democratic Workers' Party
Jan Lorenc	Czechoslovak Social Democratic Party
Wenzel Lorenz	German Social Democratic Workers' Party
Josef Lukeš	Republican Party of Farmers and Peasants
Josef Luksch	Farmers' League
František Malínský	Czechoslovak National Democracy
Stanislav Marák	Czechoslovak Social Democratic Party
František Mareš	Czechoslovak National Democracy
Teodor Matuščák	Czechoslovak Social Democratic Party
Robert Mayr-Harting	German Christian Social People's Party
Robert Meissner	German National Party
Alois Měchura	Czechoslovak Social Democratic Party
Pavol Mudroch	Czechoslovak Social Democratic Party
Ján Mudroň	Czechoslovak People's Party
August Naegle	German National Party
Bohumil Němec	Czechoslovak National Democracy
Wilhelm Niessner	German Social Democratic Workers' Party
Gustav Oberleithner	German National Party
Richard Osvald	Czechoslovak People's Party
František Pánek	Republican Party of Farmers and Peasants
Rudolf Pánek	Czechoslovak Socialist Party
Anna Perthen	German Social Democratic Workers' Party
Josef Petřík	Czechoslovak Social Democratic Party
Johann Polach	German Social Democratic Workers' Party
František Poliak	Czechoslovak Social Democratic Party
Karel Prášek	Republican Party of Farmers and Peasants
Adolf Procházka	Czechoslovak People's Party
Jan Procházka	Czechoslovak Social Democratic Party
Vincenc Procházka	Czechoslovak People's Party
Josef Průša	Czechoslovak Social Democratic Party
Ondřej Přikryl	Czechoslovak National Democracy
František Reyl	Czechoslovak People's Party
Josef Reyzl	German Social Democratic Workers' Party
Béla Riskó	Independent
Šimon Roháček	Republican Party of Farmers and Peasants
Jan Rozkošný	Republican Party of Farmers and Peasants
Ján Ružiak	Republican Party of Farmers and Peasants
Karel Sáblík	Republican Party of Farmers and Peasants
Václav Sehnal	Republican Party of Farmers and Peasants
Josef Sechtr	Republican Party of Farmers and Peasants
Josef Seifert	Czechoslovak National Democracy
Antonín Slavík	Republican Party of Farmers and Peasants
Antonín Smetana	Czechoslovak Social Democratic Party
Josef Smrtka	Republican Party of Farmers and Peasants
Karel Sokol	Czechoslovak National Democracy
František Soukup	Czechoslovak Social Democratic Party
Ludwig Spiegel	German Democratic Freedom Party
Erdmann Spies	Farmers' League
Franz Karl Stark	German Social Democratic Workers' Party
Antonín Cyril Stojan	Czechoslovak People's Party
Adolf Stránský	Czechoslovak National Democracy
Antonín Svěcený	Czechoslovak Social Democratic Party
Antonín Svraka	Czechoslovak Social Democratic Party
Josef Schiller	German Social Democratic Workers' Party
Karl Eugen Schmidt	Independent
František Šabata	Czechoslovak People's Party
Josef Šáda	Czechoslovak Social Democratic Party
Antonín Šachl	Czechoslovak People's Party
Vincenc Ševčík	Czechoslovak People's Party
Alois Špera	Czechoslovak Social Democratic Party
Josef Štelcl	Czechoslovak Social Democratic Party
Ferdinand Šťastný	Czechoslovak Socialist Party
Václav Švec	Czechoslovak Social Democratic Party
Josef Thoř	Czechoslovak Traders' Party
Emanuel Trčka	Czechoslovak Traders' Party
František Valoušek	Czechoslovak People's Party
František Veselý	Czechoslovak Socialist Party
Moritz Vetter-Lilie	German Christian Social People's Party
Božena Viková-Kunětická	Czechoslovak National Democracy
Jaroslav Vlček	Republican Party of Farmers and Peasants
Teodor Wallo	Czechoslovak People's Party
Wilhelm Wiechowski	German Social Democratic Workers' Party
Zikmund Witt	Czechoslovak Social Democratic Party
Vojtěch Zavadil	Czechoslovak Social Democratic Party
Metoděj Jan Zavoral	Czechoslovak People's Party
František Zimák	Czechoslovak Social Democratic Party
Theodor Zuleger	Farmers' League
Josef Žďárský	Czechoslovak National Democracy
