= 1928 Slovak provincial election =

2 December 1928	1935 →
- All 54 seats in the Assembly of Slovak Province; 28 seats needed for a majority
Party	Leader	Vote %	Seats
HSĽS	Andrej Hlinka	24.64	14
RSZML	Milan Hodža	20.55	16
KSČ	Matej Kršiak	14.42	5
OKSZP	Géza Szüllő	9.14	3
MNP–ZDP–MNMP	József Törköly	7.88	3
ČSSD	Ivan Dérer	7.33	4
ŽS–ŽHS	Julius Reisz	3.42	2
ČSL	Martin Mičura	3.31	2
ČSNS	Igor Hrušovský	2.74	2
SNS	Martin Rázus	2.40	1
ČsND	Gejza Rehák	1.99	2
This lists parties that won seats. See the complete results below.
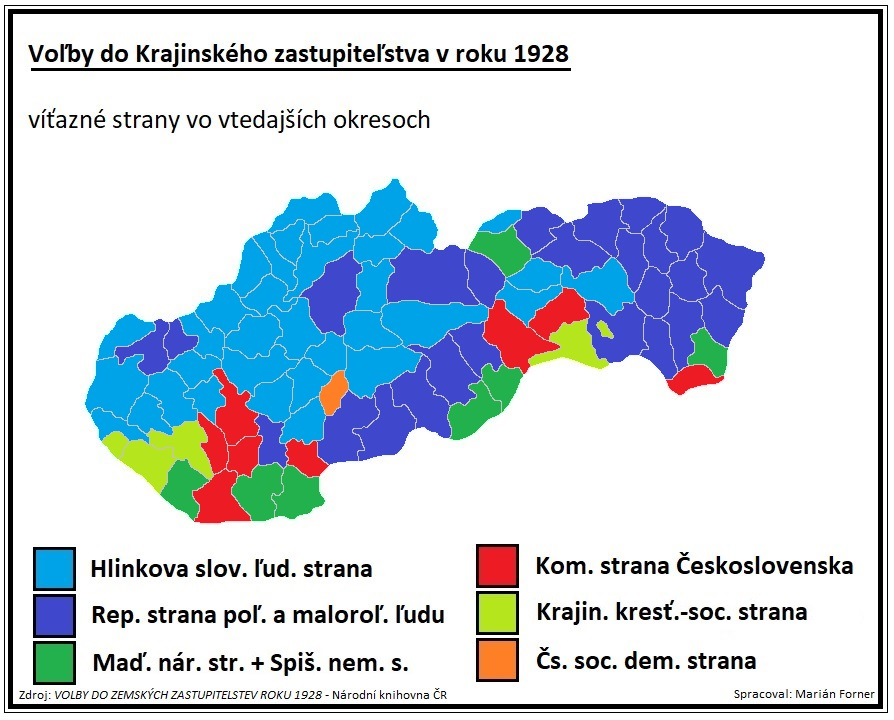
Largest political party by district
Land President before	Land President after
Ján Drobný; HSĽS	Ján Drobný; HSĽS

Provincial elections were held in Slovak Province on 2 December 1928. The elections were marked by a drop in support for the Slovak People's Party, whilst the Republican Party of Farmers and Peasants emerged as the largest party in the Assembly of Slovakia.

== Background ==
The Slovak Assembly was established on 14 July 1927 when the National Assembly abolished the counties of Czechoslovakia, replacing them with four provinces, one of which was Slovakia. The law took effect on 1 July 1928.

== Electoral system ==
The 54-member Assembly had two-thirds of its members elected and the other third appointed by the national government.

== Results ==
Party	Votes	%	Seats		
Party	Votes	%	Elected	Appointed	Total
Hlinka's Slovak People's Party	325,588	24.64	9	5	14
Republican Party of Farmers and Peasants	271,520	20.55	8	8	16
Communist Party of Czechoslovakia	190,595	14.42	5	0	5
Provincial Christian-Socialist Party	120,769	9.14	3	0	3
Hungarian-German Party (MNP–ZDP–MNMP)	104,106	7.88	3	0	3
Czechoslovak Social Democratic Workers' Party	96,901	7.33	3	1	4
Jewish Party–Jewish Economic Party	45,244	3.42	1	1	2
Czechoslovak People's Party	43,689	3.31	1	1	2
Czechoslovak National Socialist Party	36,181	2.74	1	1	2
Slovak National Party	31,679	2.40	1	0	1
Czechoslovak National Democracy	26,300	1.99	1	1	2
Czechoslovak Traders' Party	15,371	1.16	0	0	0
Hungarian Smallholder, Craftsman and Labour Party	13,635	1.03	0	0	0
Total	1,321,578	100.00	36	18	54
Source: Teich et al. Administrative Law 125/1927 Sb. Statistical Handbook
