= 1935 Slovak provincial election =

- 26 May 1935
Party	Leader	Vote %	Seats
HSĽS	Andrej Hlinka	28.51	11
RSZML	Milan Hodža	18.90	8
OKSZP–MNP	János Esterházy	14.91	5
KSČ	Július Ďuriš	12.27	5
ČSSD	Ivan Dérer	9.86	4
ČSNS	Igor Hrušovský	2.99	1
SNS	Martin Rázus	2.71	1
ČŽOS	Bohuš Kianička	2.09	1
This lists parties that won seats. See the complete results below.
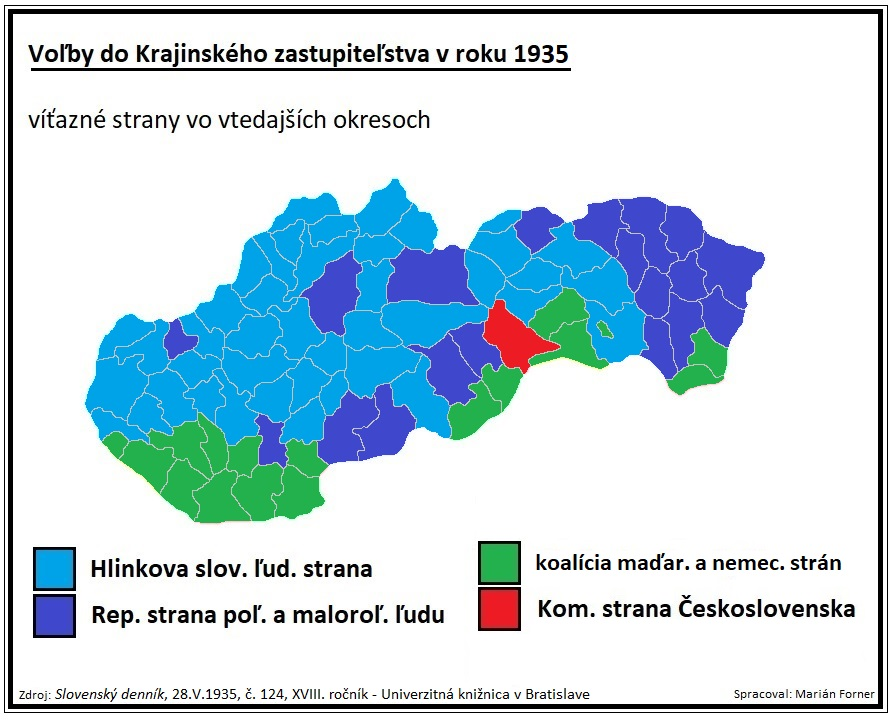
Largest political party by district
Land President before	Land President after
Jozef Országh; RSZMĽ	Jozef Országh; RSZMĽ

Provincial elections were held in Slovak Province on 26 May 1935. They elections were marked by victory of Hlinka's Slovak People's Party.

== Results ==
Party	Votes	%	Seats
Hlinka's Slovak People's Party	430,880	28.51	11
Republican Party of Farmers and Peasants	285,672	18.90	8
OKSZP–MNP	225,407	14.91	5
Communist Party of Czechoslovakia	185,494	12.27	5
Czechoslovak Social Democratic Workers' Party	148,984	9.86	4
Czechoslovak National Socialist Party	45,134	2.99	1
Slovak National Party	40,965	2.71	1
Jewish Party	36,430	2.41	0
Czechoslovak Traders' Party	31,641	2.09	1
Czechoslovak People's Party	30,563	2.02	0
National Fascist Community	26,461	1.75	0
National Unification	18,579	1.23	0
Independent National Party	5,302	0.35	0
Total	1,511,512	100.00	36
Source: Appleby, Kozarovce
