= 1935 Czechoslovak parliamentary election =

| ← 1929 | 19 May 1935 | 1946 → |
- Chamber of Deputies
- All 300 seats in the Chamber of Deputies; 151 seats needed for a majority
| Party | Leader | Vote % | Seats | +/– |
|---|---|---|---|---|
| SdP | Konrad Henlein | 15.18 | 44 | New |
| RSZML | Rudolf Beran | 14.29 | 45 | −1 |
| ČSDSD | Antonín Hampl | 12.55 | 38 | −1 |
| KSČ | Klement Gottwald | 10.32 | 30 | 0 |
| ČSNS | Václav Klofáč | 9.18 | 28 | −4 |
| ČSL | Jan Šrámek | 7.48 | 22 | −3 |
| AB | Andrej Hlinka | 6.86 | 22 | New |
| NSj–RNAP–RNP | Karel Kramář | 5.57 | 17 | New |
| ČŽOS | Josef Václav Najman | 5.44 | 17 | +5 |
| DSAP | Ludwig Czech | 3.64 | 11 | −10 |
| OKSZP–MNP–ZDP | Géza Szüllö | 3.55 | 9 | 0 |
| NOF | Radola Gajda | 2.03 | 6 | New |
| DCVP | Karl Hilgenreiner | 1.98 | 6 | −8 |
| BdL | Franz Spina | 1.73 | 5 | New |
This lists parties that won seats. See the complete results below.
- Senate
- All 150 seats in the Senate; 76 seats needed for a majority
| Party | Leader | Vote % | Seats | +/– |
|---|---|---|---|---|
| SdP | Konrad Henlein | 15.01 | 23 | New |
| RSZML | Rudolf Beran | 14.33 | 23 | −1 |
| ČSDSD | Antonín Hampl | 12.51 | 20 | 0 |
| KSČ | Klement Gottwald | 10.18 | 16 | +1 |
| ČSNS | Václav Klofáč | 9.24 | 14 | −2 |
| ČSL | Jan Šrámek | 7.66 | 11 | −2 |
| AB | Andrej Hlinka | 6.8 | 11 | New |
| NSj–RNAP–RNP | Karel Kramář | 5.64 | 9 | New |
| ČŽOS | Josef Václav Najman | 5.41 | 8 | +2 |
| DSAP | Ludwig Czech | 3.73 | 6 | −5 |
| OKSZP–MNP–ZDP | Géza Szüllö | 3.57 | 6 | 0 |
| DCVP | Karl Hilgenreiner | 2.13 | 3 | −5 |
This lists parties that won seats. See the complete results below.
| Prime Minister before | Prime Minister after |
|---|---|
| Jan Malypetr; RSZML | Jan Malypetr; RSZML |

Parliamentary elections were held in Czechoslovakia on 19 May 1935. The result was a victory for the newly established Sudeten German Party, which won 44 seats in the Chamber and 23 in the Senate. Funded by the German Nazi Party, it won over two-thirds of the vote amongst Sudeten Germans. Voter turnout was 91.9% in the Chamber election and 81.2% for the Senate. These elections would be the last in Czechoslovakia until 1946.

== Results ==
=== Chamber of Deputies ===
| Party | Votes | % | Seats | +/– |
|---|---|---|---|---|
| Sudeten German Party | 1,249,534 | 15.18 | 44 | New |
| Republican Party of Farmers and Peasants | 1,176,628 | 14.29 | 45 | –1 |
| Czechoslovak Social Democratic Workers' Party | 1,032,773 | 12.55 | 38 | –1 |
| Communist Party of Czechoslovakia | 849,495 | 10.32 | 30 | 0 |
| Czechoslovak National Social Party | 755,872 | 9.18 | 28 | –4 |
| Czechoslovak People's Party | 615,804 | 7.48 | 22 | –3 |
| Autonomous Bloc (HSĽS–SNS–AZS–PSL) | 564,273 | 6.86 | 22 | New |
| National Unification–RNAP–RNP | 458,351 | 5.57 | 17 | New |
| Czechoslovak Traders' Party | 448,049 | 5.44 | 17 | +5 |
| German Social Democratic Workers' Party | 299,945 | 3.64 | 11 | –10 |
| OKSZP–MNP–ZDP | 291,837 | 3.55 | 9 | 0 |
| National Fascist Community | 167,434 | 2.03 | 6 | New |
| German Christian Social People's Party | 162,781 | 1.98 | 6 | –8 |
| Farmers' League | 142,402 | 1.73 | 5 | New |
| National Unification of the Clerical-Administrative Parties | 10,225 | 0.12 | 0 | New |
| Economic Party of Debtors | 5,977 | 0.07 | 0 | New |
| Total | 8,231,380 | 100.00 | 300 | 0 |
| Registered voters/turnout | 8,957,572 | – | | |
Source: Statistical Office

=== Senate ===
| Party | Votes | % | Seats | +/– |
|---|---|---|---|---|
| Sudeten German Party | 1,092,255 | 15.01 | 23 | New |
| Republican Party of Farmers and Peasants | 1,042,924 | 14.33 | 23 | –1 |
| Czechoslovak Social Democratic Workers' Party | 910,252 | 12.51 | 20 | 0 |
| Communist Party of Czechoslovakia | 740,696 | 10.18 | 16 | +1 |
| Czechoslovak National Social Party | 672,126 | 9.24 | 14 | –2 |
| Czechoslovak People's Party | 557,684 | 7.66 | 11 | –2 |
| Autonomous Bloc (HSĽS–SNS–AZS–PSL) | 495,166 | 6.80 | 11 | New |
| National Unification–RNAP–RNP | 410,095 | 5.64 | 9 | New |
| Czechoslovak Traders' Party | 393,732 | 5.41 | 8 | +2 |
| German Social Democratic Workers' Party | 271,097 | 3.73 | 6 | –5 |
| OKSZP–MNP–ZDP | 259,832 | 3.57 | 6 | 0 |
| German Christian Social People's Party | 155,234 | 2.13 | 3 | –5 |
| National Fascist Community | 145,125 | 1.99 | 0 | New |
| Farmers' League | 129,862 | 1.78 | 0 | New |
| Economic Party of Debtors | 973 | 0.01 | 0 | New |
| Total | 7,277,053 | 100.00 | 150 | 0 |
| Registered voters/turnout | 8,957,572 | – | | |
Source: Nohlen & Stöver
