= Ludmila Pechmanová-Klosová =

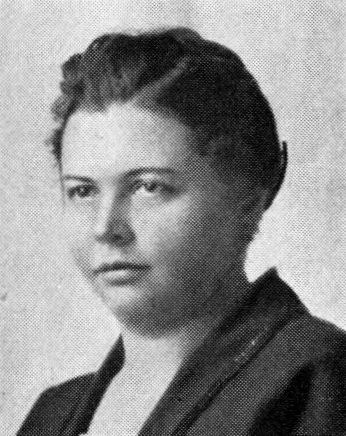

Member of the Chamber of Deputies
- In office 1920–1935
- Constituency: Mladá Boleslav

Personal details
- Born: 13 July 1885 Královské Vinohrady, Bohemia, Austria-Hungary

Ludmila Pechmanová-Klosová (13 July 1885 – ?) was a Czechoslovak politician. In 1920, she was one of the first group of women elected to the Chamber of Deputies, remaining in parliament until 1935.

== Biography ==
Pechmanová-Klosová was born in Královské Vinohrady (today the Vinohrady district of Prague) in 1885. After finishing her education, she worked as a post office clerk in the city. She became involved in trade unions and was appointed vice-president of the Association of Postal Officials in 1908. The following year she joined the Czech National Social Party.

Following the independence of Czechoslovakia at the end of World War I, Pechmanová-Klosová was a candidate for her party (now renamed the Czechoslovak Socialist Party) for the Chamber of Deputies in the 1920 parliamentary elections, and was one of sixteen women elected to parliament. She was subsequently re-elected in 1925 and 1929, serving until 1935 when poor health prevented her from running for re-election.
