= Irene Kirpal =

Czech politician (1886–1977)

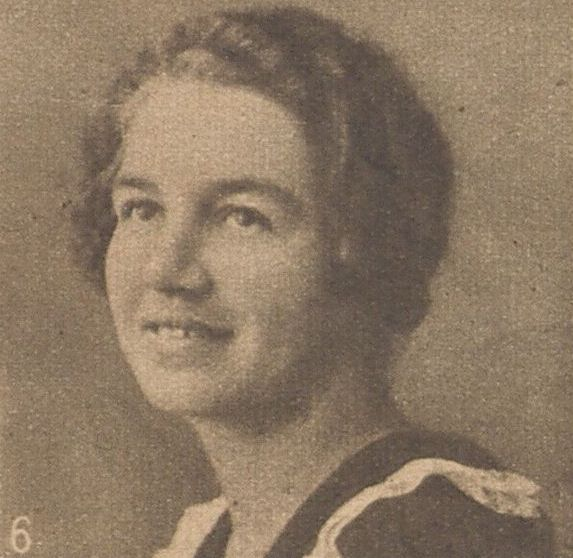

Member of the Chamber of Deputies
- In office 1920–1938

Personal details
- Born: 1 January 1886; Hořice, Austria-Hungary
- Died: 17 December 1977 (aged 91); Ústí nad Labem, Czechoslovakia

Irene Kirpal (1 January 1886 – 17 December 1977) was a Czech politician. In 1920 she was one of the first group of women elected to the Chamber of Deputies of Czechoslovakia, remaining in parliament until 1938.

== Biography ==
Kirpal was born Irene Grundmann into a Jewish family in Hořice in Bohemia, Austria-Hungary (now in the Czech Republic) in 1886. Between 1902 and her marriage in 1912, she worked in education. She joined the Social Democratic Workers' Party of Austria in 1912 and became chair of the women's section in Ústí nad Labem in 1915.

Following the independence of Czechoslovakia at the end of World War I, Kirpal was a municipal councillor in Ústí nad Labem from 1918 to 1920. She joined the German Social Democratic Workers' Party (DSAP) in 1919, and the following year was one of its candidates for the Chamber of Deputies in the parliamentary elections, in which she was one of sixteen women elected to parliament. She was subsequently re-elected in 1925, 1929 and 1935, serving in the Chamber of Deputies until the Nazi annexation of the Sudetenland in 1938. She subsequently lived in exile in the United Kingdom, returning to Czechoslovakia in 1946. She died in Ústí nad Labem in 1977.
