= Františka Skaunicová =

Member of the Chamber of Deputies
- In office 1920–1923
- Succeeded by: Josef Konečný

Personal details
- Born: 15 March 1871 Řetová, Bohemia, Austria-Hungary
- Died: 4 January 1923 (aged 51) Jevíčko, Czechoslovakia

Františka Skaunicová (15 March 1871 – 4 January 1923) was a Czechoslovak politician. In 1920, she was one of the first group of women elected to the Chamber of Deputies, remaining in parliament until her death three years later.

== Biography ==
Born Františka Pávková to carpenter's family in Řetová in 1871, Skaunicová attended school in Wildenschwert. However, she left school at a young age as her parents were unable to fund her education and she became a textile worker. She joined the textile workers' union and at the age of 20, moved to Brno, where she lived for the rest of her life. She married Augustin Skaunic in 1895, with whom she had six children. She became the family's main breadwinner due to her husband's frequent illness. From 1911 the couple ran the Žena magazine, a social democratic publication.

Following the independence of Czechoslovakia at the end of World War I, Skaunicová was a Czechoslovak Social Democratic Workers' Party candidate for the Chamber of Deputies in the 1920 parliamentary elections, and was one of sixteen women elected to parliament. In 1921, she defected to the new Communist Party and was elected to its executive committee. However, the following year she was hospitalised in Jevíčko with tuberculosis. She died in January 1923, and was buried in the Židenice cemetery in Brno.
