= Božena Ecksteinová =

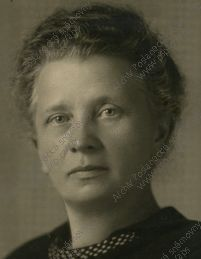

Member of the Senate
- In office 1920–1929

Personal details
- Born: 7 March 1871 Prague, Bohemia, Austria-Hungary
- Died: 22 May 1930 (aged 59) Prague, Czechoslovakia

Božena Ecksteinová-Hniličková (7 March 1871 – 22 May 1930) was a Czechoslovak politician. In 1920, she was one of the first group of women elected to the Senate, remaining in parliament until 1929.

== Biography ==
Ecksteinová was born into a working-class family in Smíchov (now a district of Prague) in 1871. After leaving school, she worked in a printing house. She joined the Czechoslavonic Social Democratic Workers' Party (ČSDSD) at the turn of the century, rising to become its treasurer. She helped found the Jubilee Study Fund that provided bursaries to party members, chaired the Greater Prague Trust Committee and was appointed to the Permanent Consumer Survey at the Ministry of Supply.

Following the independence of Czechoslovakia at the end of World War I, Ecksteinová was a member of the Revolutionary National Assembly from 1918 to 1920. She was subsequently a ČSDSD candidate for the Senate in the 1920 parliamentary elections, and was one of sixteen women elected to parliament. When the party split in the early 1920s, she took over its daily newspaper, Právo lidu. She was re-elected in 1925, serving until 1929 when she left politics due to illness. She died in Prague the following year.
