= Anna Malá =

Czechoslovak politician (1886–1948)

Member of the Chamber of Deputies
- In office 1920–1925

Personal details
- Born: 22 March 1873 Nymburk, Bohemia, Austria-Hungary
- Died: 19 April 1948 (aged 61) Prague, Czechoslovakia

Anna Malá (17 May 1886 – 19 April 1948) was a Czechoslovak politician. In 1920 she was one of the first group of women elected to the Chamber of Deputies.

== Biography ==
Malá was born in Nymburk in Bohemia, Austria-Hungary in 1886. Prior to entering politics, she was a civil servant in Královské Vinohrady (now the Vinohrady district of Prague).

She was a Czechoslovak Social Democratic Workers' Party candidate in the 1920 parliamentary elections and was one of sixteen women elected to parliament. After the party split in 1921, she joined to the newly formed Communist Party of Czechoslovakia.

After leaving parliament in 1925, she returned to working as a clerk and also contributed articles to Rudé právo, the Communist Party's newspaper. She died in Prague in 1948.
