= János Esterházy =

Hungarian politician (1901–1957)

Count János Eszterházy
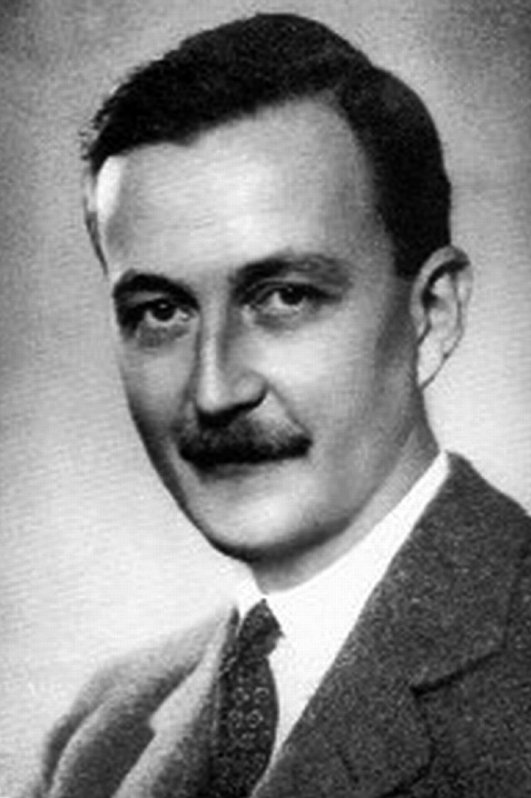
- Born: 14 March 1901; Nyitraújlak, Nyitra County, Kingdom of Hungary, Austria-Hungary (present-day Veľké Zálužie, Slovakia)
- Died: 8 March 1957 (aged 55); Mírov, Czechoslovakia
- Occupation: Politician
- Spouse: Countess Lívia Serényi
- Children: János Eszterházy; Alice Eszterházy
- Parent(s): Antal Mihály Eszterházy; Countess Elżbieta Tarnowska

Count János Eszterházy (Hungarian: [ˈjaːnoʃ ˈɛstɛrhaːzi]; rarely Slovak: Ján Esterházi; March 14, 1901 – March 8, 1957) was a prominent politician of Hungarian ethnicity in inter-war Czechoslovakia and later in the First Slovak Republic. He was a member of the Czechoslovak Parliament and of the Slovak Assembly. After the Second World War, he was illegally deported to the Soviet Union, sentenced on trumped-up charges at a show trial, and imprisoned. In the meantime, he was sentenced, in absentia, to death by the National Court in Bratislava on the charges of High Treason to the State, collaboration with the enemy, the breaking-up of Czechoslovakia and his participation in an anti-democratic regime as a deputy of the Slovak Assembly. The sentence was not executed as a consequence of a Presidential pardon, following his return to Czechoslovakia from the Soviet Union. He died in prison in 1957.

The Federation of Hungarian Jewish Communities has described him as a hero for saving Jews during World War II. On the other hand, the Federation of Jewish Communities in Slovakia has publicly criticised János Esterházy and rejected efforts to present him as "democratic, antifascist fighter and fearless savior of Jews".

== Family ==
Son of Antal Mihály Esterházy, he was born into one of Hungary's most distinguished aristocratic families, the House of Esterházy, in the Galánta branch originated from Transylvania. His mother, Countess Elżbieta Tarnowska, daughter of Professor Stanisław Tarnowski, was Polish and came from Tarnowski family, one of the oldest Polish aristocratic families, which had held the highest positions continuously since the 14th century. He was four when his father died. He went to secondary school in Budapest and after studying commerce he returned to his estate in a former area of Hungary which the Treaty of Trianon had ceded to Czechoslovakia after World War I. On October 15, 1924, he married Countess Lívia Serényi. They had two children, János and Alice.

== Political career ==
=== Czechoslovak republic ===
==== Domestic policy ====
The political policy of János Esterházy was first based upon Christian-Nationalist ideas, which later became influenced by his relations with those who held more developed liberal positions. In the 1920s, he became a member of Provincial Christian-Socialist Party (Országos Keresztényiszocialista Párt; OKszP). In 1931, he became the leader of the Hungarian League of Nations League in the Czechoslovak Republic, an organization which operated within the League of Nations. On 11 December 1932, he became the chairman of OKszP. He won a parliament mandate in Košice at the elections in 1935 and was a deputy for that constituency in the Czechoslovak Parliament until 1938. In his first speech in parliament, he said: "As we have been attached to Czechoslovakia against our will, we demand that the Czechoslovak government fully respect our minority, language, cultural and economic rights." The policy of both Hungarian opposition parties (Provincial Christian-Socialist Party and Hungarian National Party) was politically influenced and directed from Budapest. Esterházy's political ideas were influenced by contemporary irredentism and aspirations to restore Hungary to her pre Treaty of Trianon borders.

Esterházy maintained close contact with the Hungarian government with visits to Budapest, through diplomatic channels via the Hungarian Embassy in Prague, and through the Hungarian Consulate in Bratislava. This contact included written reports for the Hungarian government for which he used pseudonyms such as "Tamás", "Matyás" and number 221. These reports covered not only issues of ethnic minority policy, but also information about the internal political situations, concepts and strategies for weakening Czechoslovakia, and the politics of other countries against Czechoslovakia. From 1933, Hungary coordinated actions against Czechoslovakia with Nazi Germany. In June 1933, the Hungarian prime minister Gyula Gömbös visited Germany and together with Adolf Hitler concluded that Czechoslovakia was the main obstacle for the "rearrangement" of central Europe; that the Czechoslovak Republic should be internally dismantled, isolated internationally, and then eliminated by military power. Hungary requested not only the only alteration of borders, but "justice on historical principle." In August 1936, Miklós Horthy negotiated with Adolf Hitler and formed this idea of a common attack against Czechoslovakia to "remove (the) cancer tumor from the heart of Europe."

Hungary supported the idea of a Slovak autonomist movement which was seen as a tool for weakening the State and facilitating the potential disintegration of Czechoslovakia. Successive Hungarian governments tried to influence the autonomists and to win them over to a pro-Hungarian re-orientation, but they were not successful in the long term. Esterházy also supported the idea of Slovak autonomy and played the role of a mediator between the Hungarian government and Slovak People's Party (HSĽS). Before the elections of 1935, he tried to form an autonomist block with HSĽS. The Hungarian government intended to provide him 100,000 crowns for this purpose, but failed to do so at the last moment. Later, as an executive chairman of United Hungarian Party he asked for financial support to offer inducements to leading politicians of HSĽS. After negotiations with HSĽS in the spring of 1938 he described his goals, in a report to the Hungarian government, as an "overriding obligation of Hungarians to break (the) republic with the help of others."

In 1935, the Hungarian MPs supported the successful bid of Edvard Beneš for the office of President of the Czechoslovak Republic. Edvard Beneš promised concessions to the Hungarian minority. (Note: Similarly, this election was supported also by the Slovak Peoples' Party. The votes of these parties proved unnecessary as, in the end, Bohumil Němec withdrew his candidacy before the election.) He accepted funding from the Office of the President to support Hungarian students and "against Hungarian irredentism." The office of President Beneš paid this in four instalments; the total amount was 144,000 crowns. This was an attempt to gain the favour of a younger generation within OKszP. In 1936, Beneš proposed political governmental cooperation to Esterházy and offered him a position as a government Minister-without-Portfolio, but Esterházy did not accept the offer.

After urging on the part of the Hungarian government, the Hungarian opposition parties united and founded the United Hungarian Party (Egyesült Magyar Párt; EMP) at their congress held in Nové Zámky on 21 June 1936. This new party was headed by Andor Jaross (executed later in Hungary as a war criminal) and Esterházy. The unification of the parties was not perceived positively, however, by all members and Esterházy asked the Hungarian government for a donation of 15,000 crowns to "disarm the infringers of the order." During police questioning in 1945, he quantified the yearly support received from the Hungarian government as having amounted to 2,500,000 crowns annually. The allocation of such funding was decided by himself.

The programme of the new party emphasized the autonomy of Slovakia. In 1936, representatives of the United Hungarian Party considered fusion with Sudeten German Party (Sudetendeutsche Partei, SdP). as negotiated by the Hungarian Minister of Foreign Affairs Kálmán Kánya with German government circles in Berlin. On 15 April 1937, cooperation between both parties was agreed. On 30 November 1937, Esterházy and Jaros were delegated to negotiate with SdP about issues of German minority in Slovakia.

In the summer of 1937, Esterházy disclosed intelligence relating to the Czechoslovak Army and informed the Hungarian government about the building of military fortresses and the related budget. In the autumn of the same year he wrote a report on defense projects near Lučenec and the Ipeľ.

1938 saw the new party receive a majority of the votes cast by ethnic Hungarians. At this time, the party made their declaration to join ethnic Hungarian territories together into The Kingdom of Hungary.

==== Critical year: 1938 ====
In 1938, Esterházy participated in several negotiations in the capitals of the states primarily determined upon the weakening and ultimate elimination of the state of Czechoslovakia (Berlin, Budapest, Warsaw, Rome), where he acted as a semi-official mediator for the Hungarian government. During Hitler's visit to Italy in May 1938, he was notably invited to an intimate lunch with the Führer. In May 1938, he informed the Hungarian government of Nazi plans with regards to Czechoslovakia, which he had obtained from the leader of the Sudeten German Party, Konrad Henlein. According to his report, Czech lands would be occupied by Germany and Slovakia would be rejoined with Hungary. On the other hand, he (as a member of parliament who had taken the parliamentary oath) did not inform the Czechoslovak authorities.

In June 1938, he negotiated with some Polish representatives and asked them to use their influence with Slovak politicians from autonomist movement to adopt the Hungarian solution to the Slovak question (annexation of Slovakia by Hungary). Esterházy was aware that this idea was extremely unpopular in Slovakia because of previous Hungarian policy. Poland as a Slavic and Catholic state might play the helpful role of referee during the communications with the pro-Polish wing of HSĽS. Slovakia was to receive a similar status as Croatia had enjoyed in Austria-Hungary. This proposal presented more of his own ideas than the official attitude of the Hungarian government. Poland, which also had an interest in the breakup of Czechoslovakia, was willing to provide guarantees but the Hungarian government decided to maintain a waiting position and did not initiate the first steps expected by Poland. Moreover, such an idea was strictly rejected by the leader of Slovak pro-Polish wing of HSĽS Karol Sidor who declared: "We do not trust Hungarians and there cannot be a single word about a return to them." This statement was published in both the Polish and Slovak press. According to Esterházy's concept Slovakia was to receive autonomy within Hungary following its territorial division. After the occupation of Carpathian Ruthenia the eastern border would be adjusted to the west, to as great a degree as possible, and the southern part separated.

He was informed about a plan of the Sudeten Germans to sabotage negotiations with the Czechoslovak government. He discussed this situation with the Hungarian government and received instructions to work on such a program, which could not be fulfilled. Contrary to Sudeten Germans, he refused excessive radicalization to prevent an unnecessary bloodbath. In 1938 he met with the head of the British mission, Lord Runciman several times, and to whom he prepared a memorandum on the position of the Hungarians in Czechoslovakia.

Esterházy welcomed the Munich Agreement and together with a pro-Hungarian deputy of HSĽS, J. Janček, he immediately traveled to Budapest to prepare the groundwork for the rejoining of Slovakia and Hungary. He also wanted to take part in the negotiations about the two countries' borders in Komárno, but the head of the Czechoslovak delegation, Jozef Tiso, rejected his request. After the failure of bilateral negotiations in Komárno during which Hungary refused several Slovak proposals (autonomy for Hungarians in Slovakia, cession of Great Rye Island, balanced minorities in both countries), Esterázy participated in the preparation of the First Vienna Award (currently null and void as an act of international violence). The arbitration was mediated under leadership of Nazi Germany and Fascist Italy; Esterházy had been sent to Rome during the preparation phase by the Hungarian government because he was an expert on the Slovak-Hungarian border. In this capacity he contributed to the annexation of Košice by Hungary. The Italian government was informed of his participation directly by the Hungarian minister of foreign affairs, who also gave Esterházy instructions concerning the territorial demands of Hungary and the other potential participants.

On 11 November 1938, in his capacity as the MP of Košice (then Kassa) he welcomed the Hungarian Regent Miklós Horthy. In his speech, he asked for the same rights for Slovaks in the annexed territory as were expected for Hungarians in Slovakia. Admiral Horthy welcomed Slovaks in their "thousand year old homeland" and promised to respect their national and cultural rights. Contrary to speeches of both politicians, Hungary immediately started persecution of the non-Hungarian population in the annexed territory. Minority rights were reduced to below the standard enjoyed under democratic Czechoslovakia; rights which had been criticized as inadequate by Esterházy in previous years. Esterházy's property remained on the non-annexed part of Slovakia. According to his words, he stayed there to defend the interests of the ethnic Hungarians. Due to violation of the ethnic principle, which was previously emphasized by Hungary as a "correction of injustices of Trianon", the size of Hungarian minority shrank to about 67,000 people.

Esterházy was surprised by the behavior of the Hungarian state authorities in the annexed territory, behavior that was very much opposed to his own political principles. He tried to achieve voluntary return of Slovaks to the Kingdom of Hungary, but the Slovak public reacted very sensitively to the persecution of Slovaks in Hungary. He believed that this roughly handled form of assimilation made the Slovaks return to Hungary much more difficult. Following a bloodbath in the occupied village Šurany, he intervened in Budapest strongly declaring that such brutality damaged the Hungarian cause and made his and the Hungarian position in Slovakia untenable. However, he refused to distance himself publicly from the Hungarian policy, fearing that such action might damage the interests of Hungary. For similar reasons he criticized negotiations in Komárno before the First Vienna Award. According to his point of view, excessive territorial demands damaged Hungary as they strongly dissuaded Slovaks from entertaining a Hungarian re-orientation.

After the Munich Agreement the situation in Slovakia became radicalized and the democratic system collapsed. Beside HSĽS, only the German Party and Esterházy's United Hungarian Party remained legal. In the rigged elections in November 1938, HSĽS placed Esterházy in an attractive 17th place on "common list of candidates" and he thus became a member of the new Slovak Assembly.

In December 1938, he visited Poland again. According to the memoir of a member of the Polish diplomatic corps and politician, Jan Szembek, Esterházy judged the results of the First Vienna Award as insufficient. He complained also about the failure of a planned action against Trans-Carpathian Ruthenia (still part of Czechoslovakia), which was subsequently attacked on 20 November 1938 by terrorist groups of the Polish and Hungarian voluntaries (they performed several diversion actions against Czechoslovakia with the goal of its destabilization). Esterházy declared that it was necessary to prepare new "energic decisions" and promised his personal engagement with regard to Carpathian Ruthenia and in favor of Hungary. He also noted that such actions would be secured by his parliamentary immunity.

On 23 January 1939, the autonomous Slovak government created a commission that was the first to propose anti-Jewish laws. On 26 January, Esterházy advised the Hungarian government to adopt anti-Jewish laws faster and in a more radical form than in Slovakia. This, he believed, would strengthen the position of Hungary in support of its claim to Slovakia lands after the disintegration of Czechoslovakia. In his report he expressed the wish that "thus we can hopefully achieve that Berlin will turn away from them completely and we will benefit if Berlin decides to solve the Czechoslovak issue definitely".

Esterházy published a daily paper, Új Hírek (In English: Fresh News) in Bratislava, but it was banned and Esterházy fell under police surveillance. Later he published a new daily, the Magyar Hírlap (Hungarian Newspaper) in which he urged the necessity for land reform in the annexed territory.

=== Slovak Republic (1939–1945) ===
==== Activities in the Assembly ====
The First Slovak Republic was founded as a secondary product of Nazi aggression against Czechoslovakia on 14 March 1939. Esterházy tried to persuade Nazis that Slovaks supported unity with Hungary during his visit in Berlin in February 1939, but he officially welcomed the establishment of "independent" Slovakia in a radio speech. He presented the creation of the new state as a liberation from "Czech slavery" or from the "Czech yoke" as he did on the first anniversary. Shortly after the breakup of Czechoslovakia, Slovakia was attacked by Hungary without a declaration of war. The head of Hungarian military intelligence Rezső Andorka states in his memoir that he met with Esterházy the day before the Hungarian attack and Esterházy expressed his great enthusiasm for this idea.

Esterházy was a member of the assembly transportation-technical committee, which did not discuss laws of higher political importance. His political activities were driven by pragmatic interests and were politically inconsistent. He helped to create the anti-democratic and totalitarian regime, but he expected that the same regime would behave in a humanistic and tolerant way. He positively evaluated the role of pro-fascist Hlinka Guard, but criticized its violence and the emerging labor and internment camps. Among other anti-democratic laws, he appreciated restriction of press freedom and the censorship in November 1939. He involved himself in discussions about who is more loyal and who better serves Nazi Germany among German satellites. He disputed the strongly pro-nazi messages of newspapers accusing Hungary of being an unreliable ally. According to his opinion, Hungary had an irreplaceable role in the "creation of new European order" because of the deep roots enjoyed by the German-Hungarian friendship and he stood close to Axis Powers in their "giant struggle for better future of Europe". Similarly, he supported the influence by Germany and Italy on the Hungarian prime minister.

He also returned to his political activities in mid-war Czechoslovakia. Hungarian politicians who collaborated with Czechoslovak governments were marked by him as traitors and he confirmed that he would not perform "such activities as against Czechoslovakia". As he stated, Czechoslovakia was understood by him as a state without any right for existence and he wished to break it in his role as a deputy of the Czechoslovak Parliament.

In Bratislava, he founded a publishing company and backed the operations of Hungarian Cultural Association of Slovakia (SzEMKE), an ethnic Hungarian cultural organisation that had been banned but was reestablished in 1942.

==== Minority rights ====
Esterházy was the sole deputy in the Slovak Assembly representing the Hungarian minority. His speeches were focused mainly on problems of Hungarian minority rights and Slovak-Hungarian relationships. All of his 19 parliament speeches were presented in the Hungarian language, in accordance with the rules of procedure of the Slovak National Assembly. His nomination was understood as an accommodating step under the declared principle of reciprocity. Slovakia expected that Hungary would proceed the same way for Slovaks. He did accept the nomination on a government list of candidates as an expression of officially sympathies for Slovak emancipation compliant with his strategic goals.

Authoritative Slovak regime applied the principle of reciprocity as the only effective tool to prevent persecution of Slovaks in territory occupied by Hungary. The principle was included in the new Slovak Constitution and it bound the minority rights of Hungarians in Slovakia to the rights of Slovaks in Hungary. Esterházy represented the minority, which played a role of hostages with the risk that the situation would proceed with extreme. Also for the sake of the Hungarian community in Slovakia, he had tried to enforce minority rights for Slovaks in Hungary in November 1938, but he had not succeeded. The Slovak government had also tried to create offices of state secretaries for the minorities where Esterházy could represent the Hungarian minority, but it was not successful because of the unwillingness of the Hungarian government. He personally intervened to ask the Saint Adalbert Association in Hungary to identify the conditions of the Slovak government to allow the Hungarian cultural association (Szlovenskózi Magyar Kulturegyesulet - SzEMKE).

In 1940, the United Hungarian Party was renamed to the Hungarian Party in Slovakia (Szlovenskói Magyar Párt). Due to the principle of reciprocity, his party was officially registered only in 1941 when the Hungarian government had officially permitted the activities of the Party of Slovak National Unity. (Note: The principle which allowed the refusal of registration of a minority party if Slovaks do not have similar right in opposite country was included in the constitution on 27 July 1941.) Esterházy requested the help of the Hungarian minister of foreign affairs Csáky to persuade Teleki in December 1940. Teleki refused the Slovak delegation in February 1941. On 1 March 1941, the Slovaks in Hungary published a memorandum demanding permission of the Slovak party. Esterházy supported and urged their requests in the Hungarian government, which was not successful yet. On 10 July 1941, he delivered a memorandum about injustices against Hungarians in Slovakia to Slovak prime minister Vojtech Tuka asking also for permission of the Hungarian party in Slovakia. Shortly after (15 July 1941) Emanuel Böhm, leader of Slovaks in Hungary, addressed a memorandum similar in content and form to the Hungarian prime minister as a reaction. Böhm and Esterházy met in an informal meeting in Budapest and they exchanged both memorandums. (Note: Emanuel Böhm notes in his memories that Esterházy was astonished by the content and after clarification he promised to intervene. In the evening of the same day he called to Böhm that László Bárdossy is expecting a request for registration of the Slovak party and positively inclined to deal.) Repetition of all Esterhazy's steps (submissions, newspaper articles, appeals, etc.) was then used by Slovaks in Hungary as a new tactic. Vojtech Tuka and László Bárdossy agreed on reciprocal registration of minority parties at the end of 1941 after German intervention. In October 1942, Esterházy held a speech on the presidency of the Hungarian United Party and asked for an improvement of the situation of the Hungarian minority. He also addressed an additional memorandum to the Slovak government. This Esterházy speech was again translated and paraphrased by Böhm. Böhm tried to publish it as demands of the Slovak minority in the newspaper Slovenská jednota, however the article was banned by the Hungarian censorship.

==== Involvement in the antisemitic policy ====
Esterházy as a member of Slovak Diet voted for several anti-democratic laws including antisemitic laws leading to the Jewish tragedy. He not only agreed with the measures against Jews but also supported them actively by his presentations. In his parliamentary speeches, he repeatedly declared support for antisemitic policy of government. On 28 November 1939, when he discussed Hungarian minority rights, he commented also the first trials for "aryanisation" of Jewish property. He did not criticize the fact that the government nominated commissars to manage Jewish companies but the low number of Hungarians who were allowed to participate. He also declared that three such commissars were nominated thanks to his repeated intervention.

In the spring 1940, the assembly discussed the first "Aryanization" law. The law was finally adopted on 25 April 1940, in Esterházy's presence and without any objections or amendments to the text from his side. The law restricted the foundation of new companies by Jews, restricted their ability to dispose of their own property and allowed authorities to close their companies or to sell them to "qualified Christian prospects".

In June 1940, Germany ordered changes in the Slovak government which strengthened the position of radicals and accelerated the solution of the "Jewish issue". On 3 September 1940, Esterházy voted for the constitutional act which entitled the government to "take every measures necessary for the exclusion of the Jews from the Slovak economic and social life and to transfer the property of the Jews into the ownership of the Christians".

Shortly after adoption of this law, several antisemitic regulations were issued during the same month. Jews lost the right to drive motor vehicles, they handed over their passports (and lost their last chance to emigrate) and the government created a central organization for all Jews (Ústredňa Židov). Until 16 September Jews had to deliver an inventory of their property. Also in this situation, Esterázy publicly agreed with government antisemitic policy and attacked Jews in the assembly. In his speech from 8 October 1940, he welcomed the special categorization of Jews during the incoming census and declared that "Hungarian salesmen over decades and centuries were suffering as much from Jews and Jewish frauds as the Slovak were". On the other hand, he protested against harming Hungarians under the cover of "the legitimate fight against Jews". He also positively evaluated "real and fast measures" against Jews to retire them from the economic life.

==== Deportation law ====
Social and economic exclusion of Jews, demonstrably supported and agreed by Esterházy in the Assembly, led to the creation of large socially dependent group whose members lost their jobs and property. This degraded the Jewish community to undesirable "social burden" and the government found a "solution" in deportation of Jews outside the country's borders.

Esterházy's views on antisemitic policy presented in the Assembly did not oppose the official policy of the state until 15 May 1942. In this time, most of the Jewish population was already deported and the assembly discussed so called "deportation law." Events associated with this law are frequently misinterpreted and Esterházy is incorrectly presented as the only one who disagreed with deportations or the only one who voted against the law. The adoption of the law did not start the deportation process what is usually ignored and not mentioned by Esterházy admirers and it is considered to be controvert (not exclusively negative or positive) step by historians dealing with holocaust in Slovak Republic (1939–1945). The assembly refused to legalize deportations already in March (when the deportations began) despite strong pressure of radicals. After unsuccessful attempts to stop deportations and failure of negotiation with pro-Nazi prime minister Vojtech Tuka, the chairman of the assembly Martin Sokol concluded with some other deputies that existence or non-existence of the official law had no impact on the fact that Jews are deported, but its adoption can save part of them. The law retroactively legalized existing deportations but defined the legal frame to protect certain groups.

Nowadays, the exact process of voting can hardly be reconstructed. Esterházy did not vote against, but unofficially abstained (the voting process did not allow abstain officially or to vote against). A group of deputies left the assembly hall on a protest before voting, besides several Slovak deputies also German deputy for Deutsche Partei Jozef Steinhübel. Another group proposed to extend the list of protected people also for parents of Jews who will receive exceptions. Esterházy did not propose any change request, did not hold any speech and during voting he simply did not raise his hand. His gesture became known because of articles in pro-fascist press who attacked him immediately. However, the press intentionally concealed all mentions about other deputies, what was observed already in that time also by the Nazi intelligence agency. (Note: Von der Presse wurde natürlich nicht veröffentlicht, dass sich auch einige Geistliche bei der Abstimmung von der Abgabe ihrer Stimmen zurückhielten.) Thanks to these events Esterházy become the only one among the members present for whom it was obvious that he did not vote and the only one who did it in a public and demonstrative way.

This positive gesture came relatively late. Only about 15,000 out of 57,628 Jews deported in 1942 were deported after adoption of the law. Esterházy did not wish to declare his opinion publicly, but he did it in private conversation with Martin Sokol before voting. Later, he explained his reasons also in a letter for the Hungarian government. He declared that the law is bad and not human, but he also confirmed his antisemitic orientation "from early childhood" and expressed his will to remain antisemitic. He reasoned his motivation also by the fact that he was a minority politician and could not vote for a law which granted majority rights to deport a minority.

The case of deportation was one of his last active steps in the Assembly. From the second half of 1942, he moved to more passive and alibistic position. This was the same or similar process which could be observed also for many members of ruling party.

==== Help to persecuted people ====
Esterházy preserved his contacts with the Poles from the interwar period. During the war, the Slovak-Hungarian border became a territory with high importance for the Polish resistance movement. Most of the courier and trafficker lines between occupied Poland and Hungary passed through southern Slovakia. This channel was used to preserve the connection between the home resistance and the exiled leaders. Poles were in contact with several pro-Polish deputies of the Slovak People's Party represented by Pavol Čarnogurský who acted as contact person to cross the Hungarian border as well as with János Esterházy who used his parliamentary immunity to transfer Poles in his car. He also intervened to help captured Poles who were sent to the Germans.

According to Janek, Esterházy secretly arranged visas and passports for Jews. The Hungarian government disagreed with his operations therefore László Bárdossy prohibited him from saving Jewish people and others, however he continued in his actions. He states that he saved the lives of many Jews, Slovaks, Czechs and Poles..

==== Loss of immunity and end of the war ====
With the leader of the Carpathian Germans Franz Karmasin, Esterházy led several requests for prosecution and cancellation of parliamentary immunity. Most of the cases were related to the violation of traffic rules and the prosecution was not approved by the assembly. The single exception was an incident in a train station in Poprad on 22 October 1943. (Note: When an elite train of railways (Tatranský expres) broke, it was replaced by a regular train. According to police sources, the disenchanted Esterházy screamed about six times that "this is as fake as everything in this state." This was considered especially incendiary by attendees, because it was said by a well-known public official in an authoritative state.) The immunity committee then recommended permission for prosecution, which was agreed to unanimously with massive applause of other deputies. After his loss of immunity, he spoke in the assembly only twice – in debate about the state budget for 1944 and in debate about the law of defense of the state in February 1944.

Since 1943, his political activity declined in the context of internal political changes and turnover in the war. In October 1944, he protested against the occupation of Hungary by the German army. When the fascist Arrow Cross Party came to power, he was asked to transform his party to its local branch but refused. The Arrow Cross Party regime interned him for a short time and the German Gestapo subsequently declared him wanted. He hid from the Germans and Czechoslovak authorities until the Soviet troops arrived.

=== Prison and death ===
After the liberation of Slovakia, he started to restore his activities on behalf of the Hungarian party. He criticized post-war persecutions of the Hungarian minority, liquidation of the Hungarian occupation regime in southern Slovakia and participated on a memorandum against the Košice Program. He was arrested by Czechoslovak authorities and investigated for his activities.

Esterházy had to be judged by the Slovak National Court as all members of the Slovak Assembly, but he was illegally deported by the Soviet Army in summer 1945. Esterházy was kept for one year in the feared prison of Lubyanka in Moscow, and then, on the basis of fabricated allegations, he was sentenced to ten years of work in Siberia. In the meantime, the Slovak National Court in Bratislava on 16 September 1947, sentenced him in his absence to death for breaking up the Czechoslovak state, collaboration with the fascist regime and for his participation as a deputy of the Slovak Assembly. In 1949 the Soviet Union extradited him to Czechoslovakia. Esterházy was already seriously ill at that time. He was not executed as a presidential pardon commuted his sentence to life imprisonment. Over the next years he was transferred from prison to prison in Czechoslovakia. He died in Mírov prison hospital in 1957 on 8 March, six days before his 56th birthday.

== Efforts for his rehabilitation ==
On 21 January 1993 the Russian justice system rehabilitated János Esterházy after deciding that his deportation into the USSR, passing a sentence and imprisonment were unlawful. Materials on the rehabilitation were passed to the Hungarian Government even if he was not a citizen of Hungary during his political career.

His daughter, Alice Esterházy-Malfatti, as well as some ethnic Hungarian politicians in Slovakia and politicians in Hungary, have been trying to achieve the rehabilitation in Slovakia of János Esterházy since November 1989, supported by the Hungarian government. The effort has not been successful so far. In 1993, the appeal to the Town Court of Bratislava was raised to permit re-opening the trial of János Esterházy with the goal to achieve a verdict of innocence. A year later, proceedings took place to decide if reopening the trial is justified and based on new facts which can bring new aspects to the original lawsuit. The Town Court performed extensive evidence including examination of witnesses in Bratislava and Budapest. The court also requested expert opinions from the Historical Institute of the Slovak Academy of Sciences, from several historical institutions from Hungary, from a historian dealing with the history of the Hungarians in Slovakia and two Czech historians. In 1994, the initiator changed the original appeal and withdrew the issue of reopening. Through her attorney she addressed the General Prosecution to cancel the original sentence due to infringement of the rights of the accused. The European Commission of Human Rights in Strasbourg refused her complaint against the legality of the original trial because its competency towards Slovakia starts only on 18 March 1992.

There is a letter from Simon Wiesenthal to Dr. Peter Samko, chief judge of the Town Court of Bratislava, published in the newspaper of Új Szó, 1993. In his letter Wiesenthal strongly defends Esterházy and offers witnesses on his behalf (Új Szó Daily also published: on the testimonial of the Schlesinger family of Pozsony, saved by Esterházy). The American Hungarian Federation has also worked to exonerate Esterházy and has published the Wiesenthal letter along with additional letters from Yad Veshem and historians Magda Ádám and Istvan Deak, Seth Lowe Professor Emeritus from Columbia University's Department of History (Deak's statements related to the supposed standpoints of modern Slovakia and Czechia contradicts several official documents and declarations). (Note: Istvan Deak claims in his letter that "virtually no Czech and Slovak statesman has apologized for the highly efficient 'Final Solution of the Jewish Question' in the two states" and "blaming János Esterházy will not solve the Slovak historical dilemma". However, the Slovak National Council and the Slovak Government published a common declaration related to this topic already on December 20, 1990 (13 years before his letter) during the same year as the first democratic elections occurred after the collapse of communism. (Declaration of The Slovak National Council and Government of the Slovak Republic about the deportation of Jews). "Non existing" (according to Istvan Deak) apologize for the expulsion of the German minority was approved by the Slovak National Council on February 12, 1991. (Declaration of The Slovak National Council about expulsion of Germans). On the Czech side, this topic is covered by Article No. III of the Czech-German declaration about mutual relationships and their future development (Czech-German declaration about mutual relationships and their future development) Istvan Deak criticizes that Esterhazy was "sentenced by the Czechoslovak court for having endangered the existence of Czechoslovakia, but between 1939 and 1945 there was no Czechoslovakia." On the contrary, Retribution Act No. 33/1945 Col. of Slovak National Council explicitly contains declaration that crimes are not bound to period referenced by Istvan Deak (§1 a), §2 a) and b)).)

In 2012, the World Federation of Hungarians tried to rehabilitate Esterházy in the Czech Republic through a petition that was delivered to the Chamber of Deputies of the Parliament of the Czech Republic. Committee on Petitions dealt with the petition, but rejected it on the grounds that judicial rehabilitation by Czech courts is not possible, because he was tried by the National Court in Bratislava and there is not enough evidence for another type of rehabilitation.

== Historical interpretations ==
János Esterházy belongs to the most typical examples of different views and interpretations of personalities in the common Slovak and Hungarian history. Hungarian and Slovak historians did not achieve compliance in their expert opinions requested by the court during trial for reopening his case.

=== Mainstream Hungarian and Polish histography ===
The collective of Hungarian historians declared that the prosecution of Esterházy was unfounded. Provincial Christian-Socialist Party and Hungarian United Party were national-conservative parties and they had not Nazi orientation. Hungarian Party founded by Esterházy during the first Slovak republic was "even more anti-Nazi and had everyday antifascist practice" within which it supported persecuted people. It was only a hardly tolerated organization which is proven by its late registration in 1942. Esterházy had objections against the revisionism of the Hungarian governments and he had tried to apply the Hungarian minority within Czechoslovakia until 1938. During the crisis in 1938, he did everything to prevent violent actions. Esterházy supported Slovak autonomism and he constantly worked in favor of Hungarian-Slovak friendship and cooperation. Usage of cover names was evaluated as a common diplomatic practice. According to their opinion, nobody has ever found any document which authorizes whoever to accuse Esterházy of intelligence activities or to indicate it. Because of these reasons, they characterized accusations related to breakage of Czechoslovakia and collaboration with fascism as unfounded.

Hungarian historian István Janek sees the reason of his death in his "fight for European values, human and minority rights and mutual tolerance among nations". According to his opinion, he was sentenced in his absence to prevent the presence of unwanted witnesses during his trial and that the real reason for his conviction was to intimidate the Hungarian minority. Esterházy was arrested and handed over to the Soviet secret service on the order of Gustáv Husák. As a west-oriented politician, Esterházy kept his distance from Berlin and from Moscow and because of that he did not become fascist. His antisemitism is also questioned and antisemitic statements are explained as "expected by those who held power." Esterházy is presented as a humanist, democrat and politician who can be an example for cooperation between nations in the Central Europe.

According to a memoir by his sister Lujza and some modern Hungarian historians like Molnár or Janek, Esterházy helped Slovak general Rudolf Viest (later leader of the Slovak National Uprising) to escape to London in 1939. (Note: Sources currently included in the article do not contain any details when and how this help was provided.)

Imre Molnár states that Esterházy was not antisemitic as his publications did not contain antisemitic statements. Molnár denies Esterházy's participation on approval of antisemitic laws. He states that Esterházy did not vote for the first "aryanisation" law because he was not present during the assembly meeting. However, he does not mention that the assembly voted about this law twice, because it was returned to the assembly by president Jozef Tiso. Esterházy's absence applied only to the first voting and during the second voting he was present. According to Molnár, Esterházy employed Jewish journalists at his newspaper, Esti Újság, as long as he could. He also declares that it is not true that Esterhazy voted for laws against Jewish people because the "Jewish Codex" (Regulation 198/1941 about legal status of Jews) was accepted by the government and not by the assembly and the assembly voted only for supplement provisions in connection with the Codex. This theory is not supported by the fact that not all legal norms were issued by the government. The assembly was not obliged to agree on the "Jewish Codex", because deputies (including Esterházy) explicitly delegated responsibility to exclude Jews from social and economic life by the constitutional law.

In the same support for Hungarian historical orthography of János Esterházy, Polish historians and media also portray him positively, as Poles attributed him as the supporter for the Polish government-in-exile. Late Polish President, Lech Kaczyński, had a posthumous distinction to him, considering him as a sample of a national hero of both Hungary and Poland. In March 2015, Mr. Ciechanowski stressed that János Esterházy was a Hungarian patriot and great friend of Poland and the Poles. He accentuated the fact that Francis Rakoczi and Esterházy are among the most preeminent figures personifying the thousand-year-old tradition of Polish-Hungarian friendship and the joint struggle of both nations for honour and freedom.

=== Mainstream Slovak and Czech histography ===
In contrast with Hungarian and Polish historians who highlight his national, Christian and humanistic values, Slovak and Czech historians came to the conclusion that by some positive features of the Christian-democratic politician, his activities against Czechoslovakia were unambiguously hostile.

Czech historian Jaroslav Valenta noted that the goal of Esterházy's negotiations in Poland was not the improvement of the situation of the Hungarian minority represented by him, but the realization of a Greater-Hungarian policy and attack against the integrity and independence of Czechoslovakia. His role of minority politician was completely in the background and he voluntary acted as an emissary and mediator of the Hungarian government. This kind of participation on the negotiation of two states with the goal of dividing or eliminating a third country (more if he was citizen of this country) was evaluated by him as a clear treason of the state. Valenta points out that Esterházy performed activities against the existence of Czechoslovakia during a time when he voluntarily decided for Czechoslovak citizenship. He finds very unusual Esterházy's interpretation of parliamentary immunity as a tool for preparation of aggression against the state, which provides him this privilege. Valenta questioned the method used by Hungarian historians to prove Esterházy's loyalty for the purpose of reopening his case. According to him, the same method can be used also to prove loyalty of the leader of the Sudeten Germans Konrad Henlein. Regarding their theory about the lack of documents confirming his activities against Czechoslovakia, he noted that they did not bother to study documentation from Polish sources, which have been available for years.

Slovak historian Ivan Kamenec interprets Esterházy's role both as a creator and a victim of the totalitarian regime which was built with his support. Esterházy had to decide between democratic Czechoslovakia with its shortcomings and its national principle. He decided for the second way which was already directed by Nazi Germany and paid a high personal and political price for his decision. The fact that Esterházy was not a Nazi did not prevent his collaboration with Nazis in the real world policy. His tragic life is not a reason to ignore critical views.

Another Slovak historian Ladislav Deák points out that Esterházy supported the idea of Slovak autonomy only as a preliminary step for its later incorporation to Hungary. He criticizes any tendencies to misinterpret his political activities and trials to understand him exclusively as a Hungarian patriot, defender of justified rights of Hungarians, humanist and martyr. According to Deák, Esterházy's political views go beyond this line and are made clear by his documents addressed to Hungarian politicians and the government. As other Slovak authors, he points to his anti-democratic and antisemitic activities, but positively evaluates his moral gesture during voting about deportation law. However, this moral gesture came too late and could not change anything about the tragic fate of Slovak Jews.

Ferdinand Vrábel does not speak only about ignorance of historical documents proving Esterházy's anti-state activities by Hungarian historians, but he openly speaks about lies. According to his opinion, the providing of intelligence information or Esterházy's participation during negotiations in Rome before the First Vienna Award is far from standard diplomatic practice. He criticizes the work of Imre Molnár as something which ignores current knowledge in several fields and he sees a conflict of interest between Molnár's position of the chairman of the society, for which has the goal to rehabilitate Esterházy, and his scientific work. Theories and interpretations of Imre Molnár are criticized as naive, e.g. the theory that he came to negotiations in Rome as a "private person" on a fighter plane provided by an unspecified government. As he noted, "false accusation" about Esterházy's participation regarding the adoption of antisemitic laws have been confirmed not only by Slovak historians, but also by historians of other nationalities and representatives of Slovak Jews.

Research of the Holocaust in Slovakia did not confirm Esterházy's unique role on the rescue of Jews. Slovak historiography recognizes that almost all members of the ruling elite had their "own" Jews under protection. Except help for particular people (i.e. lessees of his property) and open possibity to discover new documents, massive Esterházy's help for Jews is considered to be poorly documented and unreliable theory. During the war, Slovak Jews formed illegal organization Working Group and tried to rescue Slovaks and other European Jews. This group also organized the trafficking of Jews from Poland to Hungary, where Esterházy could play a positive role thanks to his contacts. However, known collections of documents do not contain any mention about his collaboration with this organization.

His supposed help for general Rudolf Viest is not supported by Viest's biographies by Slovak and Czech authors and it is criticized as a factual mistake. This theory is also against Viest's own memoir written before he was captured by Germans and died probably in Flossenbürg concentration camp.

Theory about the role of Gustáv Husák in his handing over to the Soviet service is criticized as based mostly on journalistic literature. Ladislav Deák points out that Soviet security authorities arbitrarily deported many thousands of Czechoslovaks and such situation was not something exceptional. The dossier on the Ministry of Foreign Affairs shows that Slovak authorities and the Ministry of Foreign Affairs wanted to ensure Esterházy's presence during his trial. A confidential letter addressed to state secretary Vladimír Clementis to request him back from USSR from 14 August 1947 presents his imprisonment by Soviets as an action of Russian military patrol without participation of Czechoslovak authorities. More, a photocopy of this document is published also by Imre Molnár. In Husák's letter to Clementis from August 21, 1947, Husák expressed his opinion that "it would be good if Esterházy is issued to our authorities."

Esterházy is sometimes referred to as a Hungarian agent or directly as a spy. His supposed objective was the revision of the Treaty of Trianon. According to István Janek from the Hungarian Academy of Sciences, such accusations are not supported by contemporary documents, due to the lack of official documents about his position and tasks.

In reaction to the glorification of János Esterházy, the Institute of History of the Slovak Academy of Sciences published in 2011 a memorandum about his political profile, signed also by directors of other Slovak historical institutes. Among other things, the memorandum declared that presenting him as a democrat, humanist and selfless savior of persecuted persons is in contrast with historical facts and his decision to not vote for deportation cannot be used as the only one and the determining criterion for all his political activities. Instead of glorification and building memorials, they recommended rational discussion about his life and actions.

== Political controversies ==
On his 100th birthday, Hungary's parliament held a memorial session in the presence of then president of the republic Ferenc Mádl. On April 20, 2007, President László Sólyom also urged Esterházy's rehabilitation. "How comes that everybody respect a "war criminal", politicians officially stand by him, while legally and in documents he is still burdened by the most severe possible condemnation?" - Sólyom said in a speech delivered at a conference organized by the Hungarian Academy of Sciences to remember Esterházy's death. This action of the Hungarian parliament caused contradictory reactions in Slovakia, increased by attendance of politicians from Party of the Hungarian Coalition and František Mikloško from Christian Democratic Movement. Other negative reactions came during placing his statues and busts in southern Slovakia. In 2011, such action led to conflict between organizers and some citizens in Košice.

In August 2011, a newspaper of the Slovak Union of Anti-Fascist Fighters interviewed president Ivan Gašparovič about his views on the Slovak National Uprising and unveiling busts of contemporary politicians János Esterházy and Ferdinand Ďurčanský. Gašparovič refused building busts of "politicians involved in misery of that time" as improper, labeling Esterházy as follower (vyznávač) of Hitler and fascism. This raised sharp negative reactions in Hungary. According to Hungarian deputy prime minister Zsolt Semjén, Esterházy always committed to the teachings of the Catholic Church and there is no coincidence that his beatification is being considered. Hungarian parliamentary party Politics Can Be Different declared that such words are not only an offence to the Hungarian minority but to the whole Hungarian nation.

== Awards ==
In 2009, the Polish president posthumously awarded him the Polonia Restituta Order for the rescue of Polish refugees and General Kazimierz Sosnkowski through territory of Hungary.

Esterházy's family and supporters tried to achieve the Righteous Among the Nations award for him, but their long term effort was unsuccessful. In 1991, Dr. Moshe Bejski, Chairman of the Commission for the Designation of the Righteous and confirmed reception of testimonies and documents for the rehabilitation of János Esterházy and paid tribute to his work and life. Later, Yad Vashem refused his nomination after consideration of all available documentation, but expressed thanks for help to particular groups of persecuted people. The positive part of the acknowledgment was referenced by Anti-Defamation League which presented the Jan Karski Courage to Care Award to Esterhazy on November 3, 2011. The award was assigned despite active protests of Jewish community in Slovakia and without any consultation with local historical institute. On November 13, 2011 representatives of Jewish community in Slovakia protested against award in open letter addressed to director of Anti-Defamation League Abraham Foxman. They criticized that "despite their great effort" ADL refused to take into account the opinion of the community affected by contemporary persecutions and were reminded of his participation on the creation of a significant number of antidemocratic, totalitarian and antisemitic laws. They criticized several opinions stated during the presentation of the award as incorrect. They disagreed with the argument that "Esterházy as a catholic could not agree with Nazi ideology and collaborate with the totality regime" and saidthat several Catholic priests were politicians in that time (including president Jozef Tiso) and making references to Christian principles was also typical for leaders of fascism in Slovakia. They said that almost all members of the ruling elite had their "own" Jews under protection, including president Tiso. In the conclusion, they expressed the opinion that ADL came under long-term lobbying of the family of János Esterházy (and some politicians) that has understandably tried to cast him in a positive light and hope that such "mistakes" will not be repeated in the future.

Some historians, such as Slovak historian of Hungarian ethnicity Imre Molnár, have been proponents and supporters of beatification of Esterházy.

== Commemoration ==
- János Esterházy Monument in Warsaw
