= Fialová legie =

Paramilitary organization

Flag of the Fialové legie

Fialová legie (FL, Czech: Purple Legion) was a paramilitary organization founded in 1936 in Czechoslovakia, which belonged to the Czechoslovak Traders' Party. Josef Václav Najman, the chairman of the party, given the situation in the 1930s, wanted to contribute to strengthening the country's defenses. The Legion was approved by the Ministry of the Interior on 12 December 1936. After the occupation in 1939 and the establishment of the Protectorate of Bohemia and Moravia, the Legion was banned.
