= Socialist Party of the Czechoslovak Working People =

Socialist Party of the Czechoslovak Working People Socialistická strana československého lidu pracujícího
- Leader: František Modráček
- Founded: 1919
- Dissolved: 1923
- Split from: Czechoslovak Social Democratic Workers' Party
- Headquarters: Prague, Czechoslovakia
- Ideology: Democratic socialism Guild socialism Syndicalism
- Political position: Centre-left to left-wing

The Socialist Party of the Czechoslovak Working People (Czech: Socialistická strana československého lidu pracujícího) was a political party in Czechoslovakia. The party was founded after a split in the Czechoslovak Social Democratic Workers' Party. The leaders of the party were František Modráček, member of parliament, and Josef Hudec. Modráček and Hudec had developed differences with the Czechoslovakian Social Democratic Workers Party, as they had adopted a more nationalist-oriented line than the party.

In the 1920 parliamentary election, the party won three seats.

Later the same year, divisions arose within the party. Modráček advocated a union of non-communist socialist parties whilst Hudec advocated that the party should spearhead a nationalist movement. At the party congress held January 6–7, 1923 the name of the party was changed to Party of Progressive Socialists (Strana pokrokových socialistů). However, differences remained. In June 1923 Modráček joined the Social Democratic Workers Party. Towards the end of the year, Hudec joined the National Democratic Club.
