= German Christian Social People's Party =

German political party in Czechoslovakia

German Christian Social People's Party Deutsche Christlich-Soziale Volkspartei
- Founded: November 1919
- Dissolved: November 1938
- Preceded by: Christian Social Party
- Merged into: Sudeten German Party
- Newspaper: Deutsche Presse
- Ideology: Conservatism; Political Catholicism; Activism
- International affiliation: White International (attendee)
- Colours: Gray

German Christian Social People's Party (German: Deutsche Christlich-Soziale Volkspartei, DCVP, Czech: Německá křesťansko sociální strana lidová) was an ethnic German political party in Czechoslovakia, formed as a continuation from the Austrian Christian Social Party. It was founded in November 1919 in Prague. The party had good relations with its Czechoslovak brother party.

In the summer of 1919, a programme for the party was drafted. On September 28, 1919, the programme was approved by a Bohemian party conference in Prague. On November 2, 1919, the program was adopted at a national party conference with delegates from Bohemia, Moravia and Silesia.

The party had an agrarian front, Reichbauernbund (a name retained from the Austrian period), and a trade union centre, Deutsch-Christlicher Gewerbe- und Handwerkerbund.

In the 1920 election, the party won ten seats (3.6% of the nationwide vote).

In the 1925 election, DCVP won 13 parliamentary seats (4.3% of the vote). After the election, the party joined the Czechoslovak national government, and DCVP politician Robert Mayr-Harting became Minister of Justice. In 1926 Gottlieb Pruscha succeeded Kirsch as general secretary of the party.

As of 1928, the party had around 38,000 members. Around 22,000 of them lived in Bohemia, 9,000 in Silesia and Northern Moravia and 7,000 in Central and Southern Moravia.

In the 1929 election, the DCVP got 14 seats, having got 4.7% of the national vote. After the election, DCVP was excluded from the national government.

In the 1935 election, DCVP gathered 2% of the national vote. The party got six parliamentary seats. After the election, the party supported the candidature of Edvard Beneš for president of the republic. In 1936, DCVP was again included in the Czechoslovak government. DCVP member of parliament Erwin Zajicek became Minister without portfolio.

After the Anschluß of Austria, the rightwing tendencies inside DCVP were emboldened and took charge of the party. The DCVP members of parliament joined the Sudeten German Party (SdP). DCVP wasn't formally dissolved, but declared that the activities of the party were suspended. The German Christian trade unions that had been tied to DCVP also aligned with SdP.
