= Robert Mayr-Harting =

Czechoslovak politician (1874–1948)

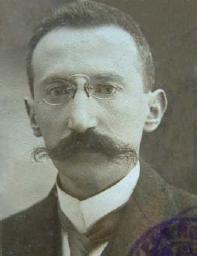
Robert Mayr-Harting

Robert von Mayr-Harting (September 13, 1874 in Aspern, now a part of Vienna – March 12, 1948 in Prague) was an Austrian-born Sudeten German politician.

The member of German Christian Social People's Party was one of few German-speaking politicians who participated in the Czechoslovak Government. He served as Minister of Justice from 12 October 1926 to 7 December 1929. He was a member of the Senate of Czechoslovakia from 1920 to 1925 and of the Chamber of Deputies of Czechoslovakia from 1925 to 1938. On 29 March 1938 he joined the People's Party with the Sudeten German Party. However, after the occupation of Czechoslovakia he made no political or public action to support the Nazi regime. After World War II the Czechoslovak authorities allowed him to remain in Prague.
