= Veľké Zálužie =

Veľké Zálužie Nyitraújlak
- Municipality
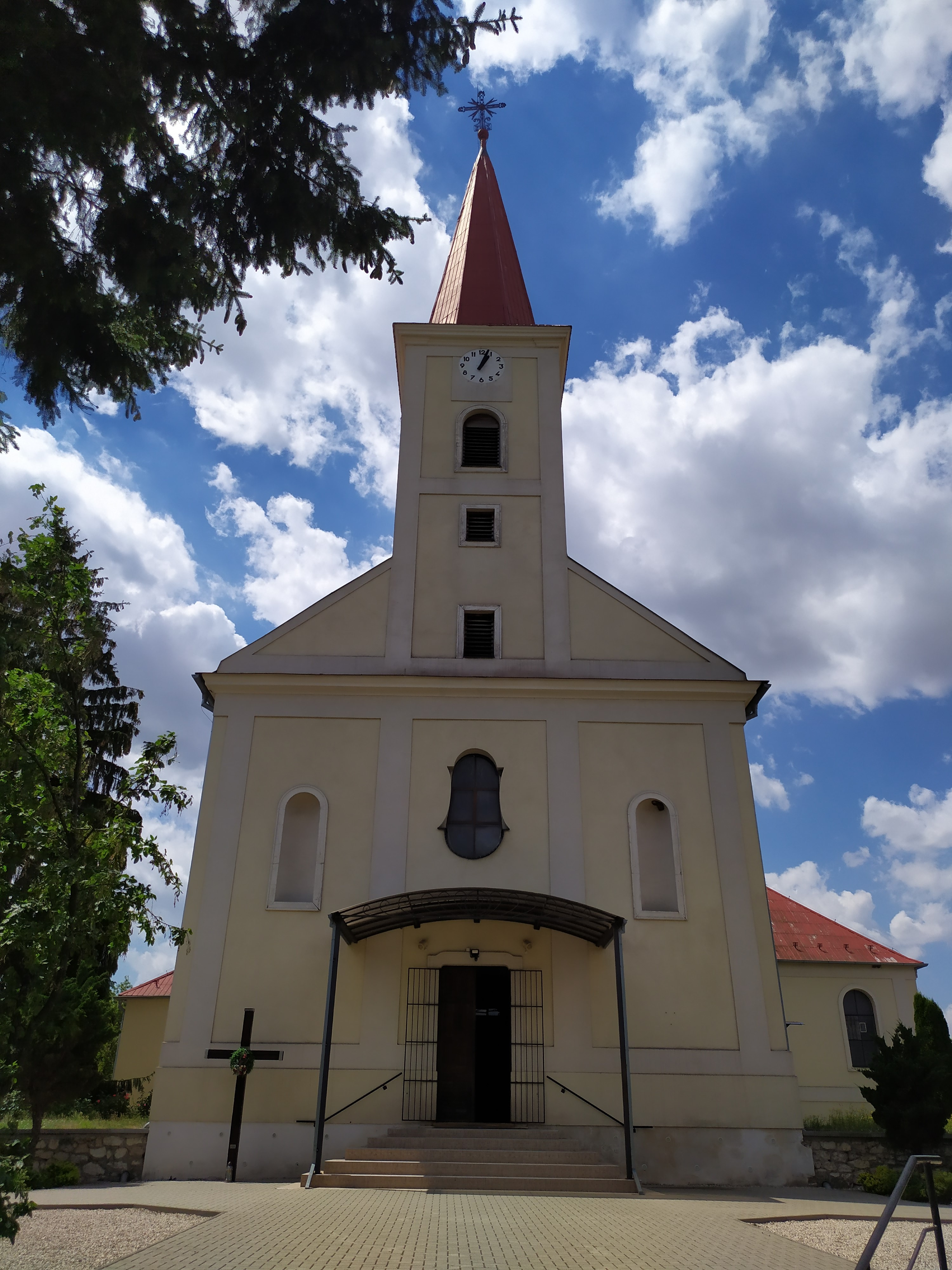
- Church of All Saints

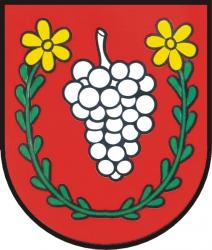
- Flag Coat of arms

- Location of Veľké Zálužie in the Nitra Region Location of Veľké Zálužie in Slovakia
- Coordinates: 48.30°N 17.95°E
- Country: Slovakia
- Region: Nitra Region
- District: Nitra District
- First mentioned: 1261

Area
  - Total: 32.10 km^{2} (12.39 sq mi)
- Elevation: 180 m (590 ft)

Population (2025)
  - Total: 4,341
- Time zone: UTC+1 (CET)
  - Summer (DST): UTC+2 (CEST)
- Postal code: 951 35
- Area code: +421 37
- Vehicle registration plate (until 2022): NR
- Website: www.velkezaluzie.eu

Veľké Zálužie (Slovak pronunciation: [ˈʋeʎkeː ˈzaːluʐɪe]; Hungarian: Nyitraújlak [ˈɲitrɒuːjlɒk]) is a village and municipality in the Nitra District in western central Slovakia, in the Nitra Region.

== History ==
The village was established in 1261.

== Geography ==
The municipality lies at an altitude of 180 metres (590 ft) and covers an area of 32.10 km^{2} (12.39 sq mi) (2025).

== Population ==
Population statistic (10 years)
Year	1995	2005	2015	2025
Count	3669	4000	4199	4341
Difference		+9.02%	+4.97%	+3.38%

Population statistic
Year	2024	2025
Count	4320	4341
Difference		+0.48%

It has a population of 4341 people (31 December 2025).

=== Ethnicity ===
Census 2021 (1+ %)
Ethnicity	Number	Fraction
Slovak	4049	93.08%
Not found out	279	6.41%
Total	4350	

In year 2021 was 4350 people by ethnicity 4049 as Slovak, 279 as Not found out, 17 as Other, 16 as Czech, 15 as Hungarian, 8 as Romani, 8 as Polish, 4 as Russian, 4 as German, 3 as Italian, 1 as Jewish, 1 as Romanian, 1 as Austrian and 1 as Bulgarian.

Note on population: The difference values of population numbers in the table "Population statistic" and in the sections "Ethnicity" & "Religion" is caused by the use of various statistical methods.

=== Religion ===
Census 2021 (1+ %)
Religion	Number	Fraction
Roman Catholic Church	3250	74.71%
None	686	15.77%
Not found out	282	6.48%
Total	4350	

In year 2021 was 4350 people by religion 3250 from Roman Catholic Church, 686 from None, 282 from Not found out, 36 from Evangelical Church, 19 from Greek Catholic Church, 17 from Christian Congregations in Slovakia, 14 from Other, 12 from Calvinist Church, 11 from Ad hoc movements, 8 from Jehovah's Witnesses, 4 from Paganism and natural spirituality, 4 from Apostolic Church, 3 from Buddhism, 2 from Eastern Orthodox Church, 1 from Jewish community and 1 from United Methodist Church.
