= Franz Spina =

Czechoslovak-German politician (1868–1938)

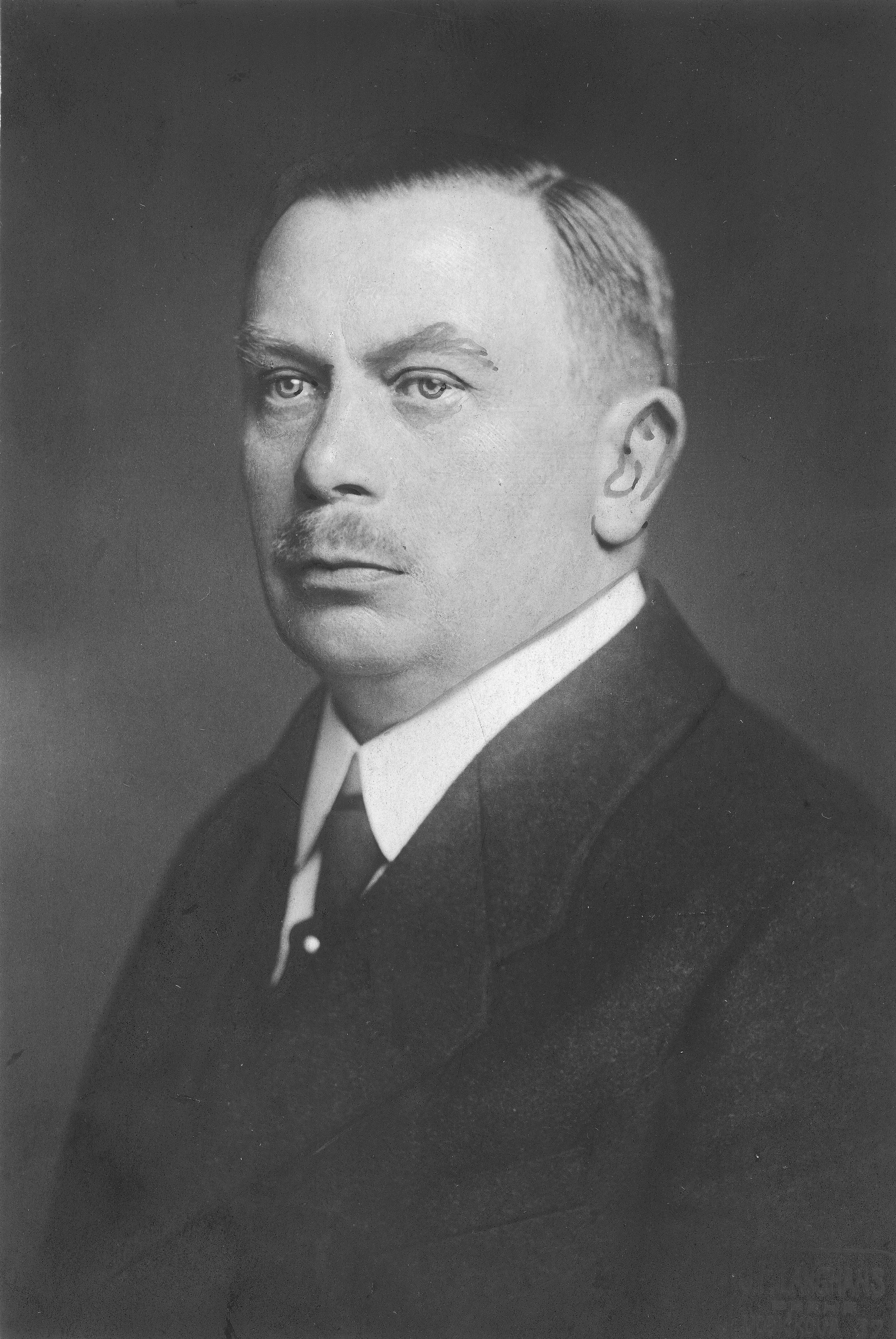
Franz Spina in 1926

Franz Spina (5 October 1868 in Městečko Trnávka – 17 September 1938 in Prague) was a German-Czechoslovak politician. He was right-wing and activist politician of the First Republic Era. Franz Spina was chairman of Bund der Landwirte, or Union of Farmers and Rural Enterprises, right-wing party of German-speaking countryside of Czechoslovakia. His party was the first to actively cooperate with Czechoslovak government and entered the Cabinet of Lord's Coalition (Prime Minister Antonín Švehla) together with Czechoslovak agrarians, clericals, entrepreneurs and national democrats. Franz Spina became the very first ethnic German government minister in Czechoslovakia. Since the establishment of Sudeten German Party, popularity of Union of Farmers had been declining. However, Spina believed in successful Czechoslovak-German cooperation until his death in 1938, fortnight before the Munich Agreement.
