= Řetová =

- Municipality
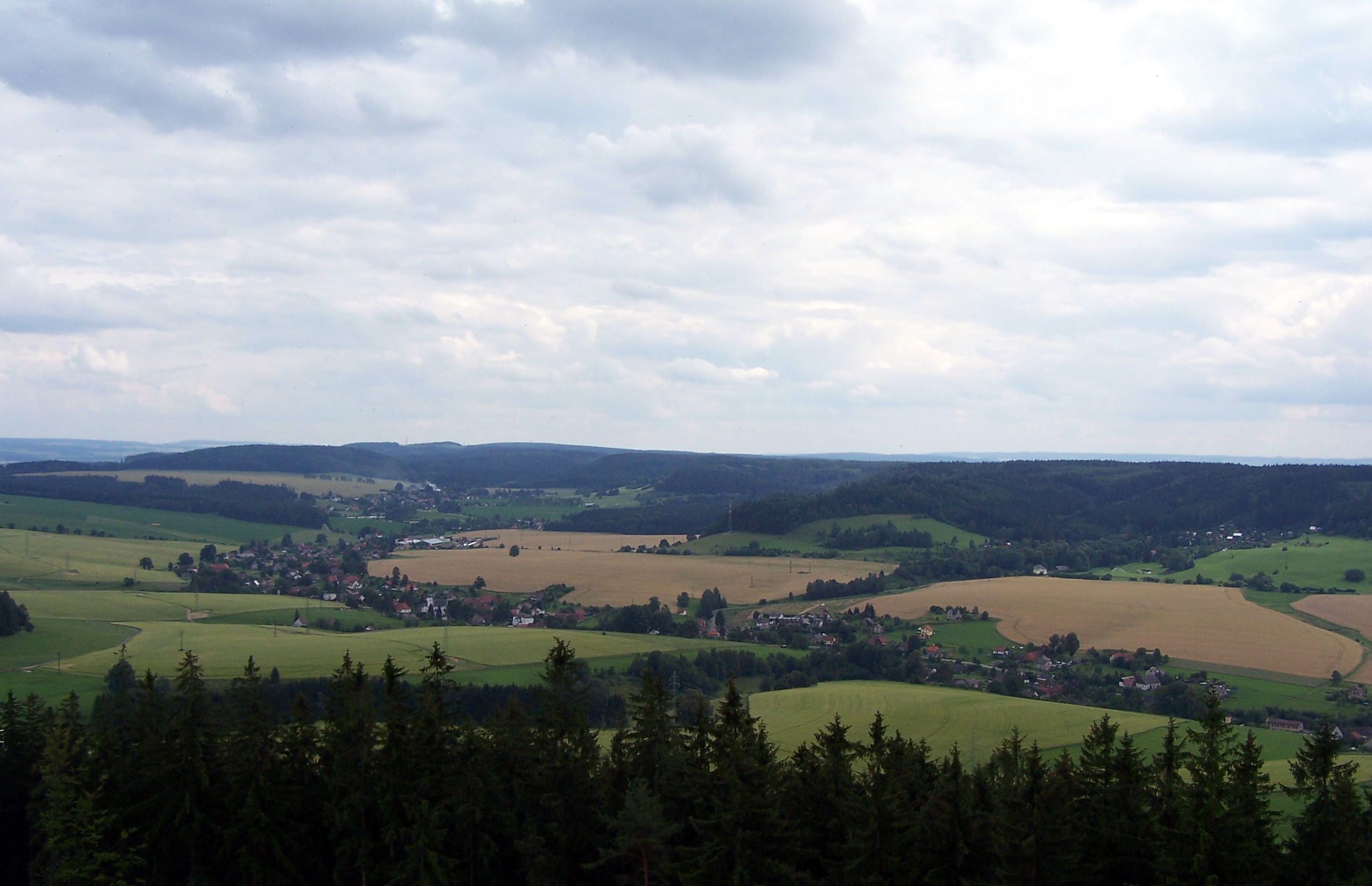
- General view

- Flag Coat of arms

- Location in the Czech Republic
- Coordinates: 49°56′45″N 16°22′53″E
- Country: Czech Republic
- Region: Pardubice
- District: Ústí nad Orlicí
- First mentioned: 1292

Area
  - Total: 8.49 km^{2} (3.28 sq mi)
- Elevation: 405 m (1,329 ft)

Population (2026-01-01)
  - Total: 678
  - Density: 79.9/km^{2} (207/sq mi)
- Time zone: UTC+1 (CET)
  - Summer (DST): UTC+2 (CEST)
- Postal code: 561 41
- Website: www.retova.cz

Řetová is a municipality and village in Ústí nad Orlicí District in the Pardubice Region of the Czech Republic. It has about 700 inhabitants.

Řetová lies approximately 4 kilometres (2 mi) south-west of Ústí nad Orlicí, 45 kilometres (28 mi) east of Pardubice, and 141 kilometres (88 mi) east of Prague.

== History ==
The first written mention of Řetová is from 1292, when it was owned by the newly established Zbraslav Monastery.

== Demographics ==
Historical population
Year	Pop.	±%
1869	1,220	—
1880	1,206	−1.1%
1890	1,189	−1.4%
1900	1,129	−5.0%
1910	1,170	+3.6%
1921	1,084	−7.4%
1930	1,035	−4.5%
1950	851	−17.8%
1961	836	−1.8%
1970	761	−9.0%
1980	734	−3.5%
1991	637	−13.2%
2001	624	−2.0%
2011	678	+8.7%
2021	649	−4.3%
Source: Censuses
