= Czechoslovak Traders' Party =

Czechoslovak Traders' Party Czech: Československá živnostensko-obchodnická strana středostavovská Slovak: Československá zivnostensko-obchodnícka strana stredostavovská
- Leaders: Rudolf Mlčoch; Josef Václav Najman
- Founded: 1920
- Dissolved: 22 November 1938
- Split from: National Democracy
- Merged into: Party of National Unity
- Headquarters: Prague, Czechoslovakia
- Newspaper: Reforma; Národní střed
- Paramilitary wing: Fialová legie
- Ideology: Liberalism; Conservatism; Economic nationalism
- Political position: Centre-right to right-wing
- Colours: Purple

The Czechoslovak Traders' Party (Czech: Československá živnostensko-obchodnická strana středostavovská, ČŽOS) was a liberal and conservative political party in Czechoslovakia, whose notable leaders were Josef Václav Najman and Rudolf Mlčoch.

== History ==
The party was established in 1920 as a split from the National Democratic Party. In the first Czechoslovak elections later in the year the ČŽOS won six seats in the Chamber of Deputies and three in the Senate. The 1925 elections saw the party increase its parliamentary representation, winning 13 seats in the Chamber and six in the Senate.

In the 1929 elections the ČŽOS was reduced to 12 seats in the Chamber, but retained its six Senate seats. The party was more successful in the 1935 elections, winning 17 seats in the Chamber and eight in the Senate.

In 1938 the party merged into the Party of National Unity following the occupation of the country by Germany and Hungary.

== Ideology ==
The party was established to represent independent retailers and craftsmen. It ran on a right-wing platform, and co-operated with the Republican Party of Farmers and Peasants in Parliament.

== Election results ==
=== Chamber of Deputies ===
Election	Leader	Votes	%	Seats	+/–
1920	Rudolf Mlčoch	122,813 (#12)	1.98	6 / 281	–
1925	Rudolf Mlčoch	285,928 (#11)	4.02	13 / 300	▲7
1929	Rudolf Mlčoch	291,209 (#11)	3.9	12 / 300	▼1
1935	Josef Václav Najman	448,049 (#9)	5.4	17 / 300	▲5

=== Senate ===
Election	Leader	Votes	%	Seats	+/–
1920	Rudolf Mlčoch	107,674 (#11)	2.06	3 / 142	–
1925	Rudolf Mlčoch	257,171 (#10)	4.2	6 / 150	▲3
1929	Rudolf Mlčoch	274,085 (#11)	4.2	6 / 150	Steady
1935	Josef Václav Najman	393,732 (#9)	5.4	8 / 150	▲2
