= Jan Malypetr =

Czechoslovak politician

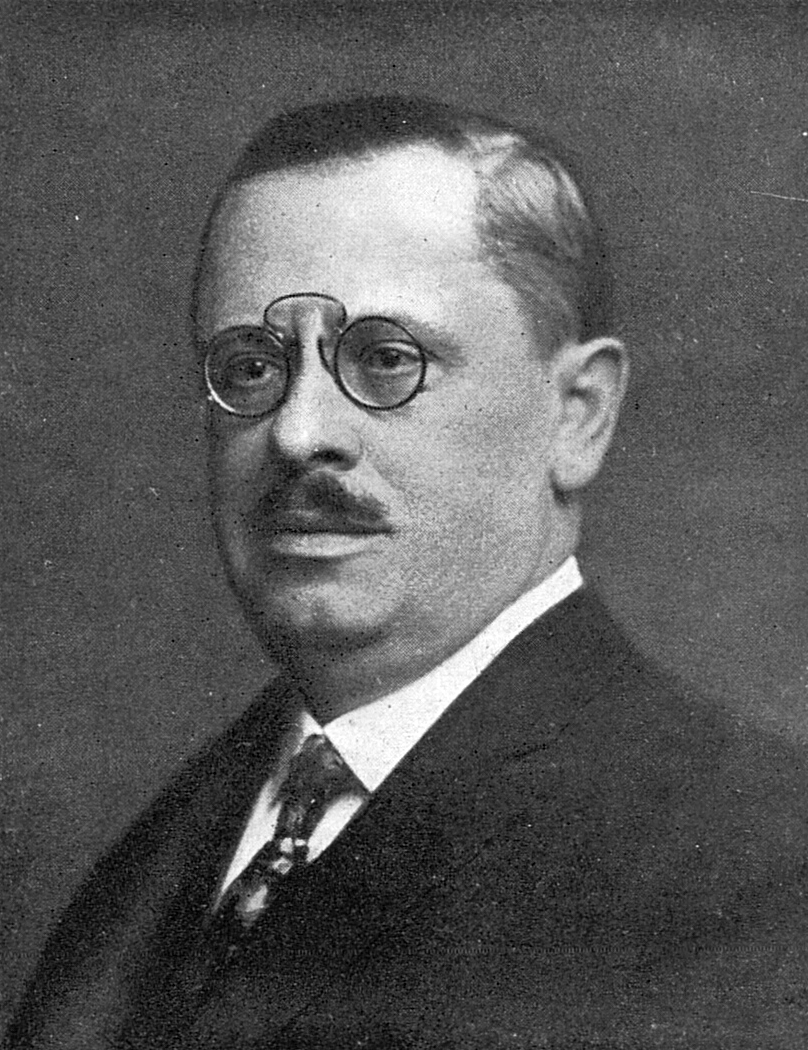
Jan Malypetr in 1928

Jan Malypetr (21 December 1873 in Klobuky – 27 September 1947 in Slaný) was a Czechoslovak politician. As prime minister during the Great Depression he strong-armed Czechoslovakia into a more rapid economic recovery than elsewhere in Europe.

A member of the Agrarian Party, he was the minister of Interior, and chairman of the Chamber of Deputies from 17 December 1925 to 29 October 1932 and again from 5 November 1935 to 1939.

Malypetr served three terms as prime minister of Czechoslovakia:

- 29 October 1932 – 14 February 1934
- 14 February 1934 – 4 June 1935
- 4 June 1935 – 5 November 1935

== Early life ==
Jan Malypetr came from landed gentry in the German speaking part of Bohemia. After attending high school and business school in Kadaň, he worked on his parents' estate, which was called u Sakulínů. He also became the president of the local sugar beet cooperative refinery.

In 1899 Malypetr joined the Agrarian Party and in 1906 became a member of its executive committee. From 1911 to 1914 he was mayor in his home town of Klobuky. From 1914 to 1918 he was mayor in Slaný.

When Czechoslovakia became independent in 1918, Jan Malypetr was appointed to the first so-called Revolutionary National Assembly under the Provisional Constitution. In 1920, in the first parliamentary elections, he was elected to the Chamber of Deputies in the National Assembly.

== Legacy ==
Among his grandsons was author Jiří Stránský. Women's Chess Grandmaster Jana Bellin is his granddaughter.

== See also ==
- History of Czechoslovakia
- List of prime ministers of Czechoslovakia

Preceded by František Udržal	Prime Minister of Czechoslovakia; 1932–1935	Succeeded by Milan Hodža
