= Zipser German Party =

Party of the First Czechoslovak Republic

The Zipser German Party (German: Zipser deutsche Partei) was a party of the First Czechoslovak Republic founded at Kežmarok on 20–22 March 1920 aiming for the representation of the Zipser Germans minority in Czechoslovakia.

In 1924, it was a member of the Arbeitsgemeinschaft der Deutschen Parteien in der Slowakei with the German National Party, the Farmers' League, the German Business Party and the German section of the Hungarian-German Provincial Christian-Socialist Party but not with the Hungarian-German Social Democratic Party nor with the Slovak section of the German Social Democratic Workers Party in the Czechoslovak Republic.

Its member of Parliament was, from 1925 to 1939, Andor Nitsch (1883–1976).
