= Ludwig Czech =

Czech attorney (1870–1942)

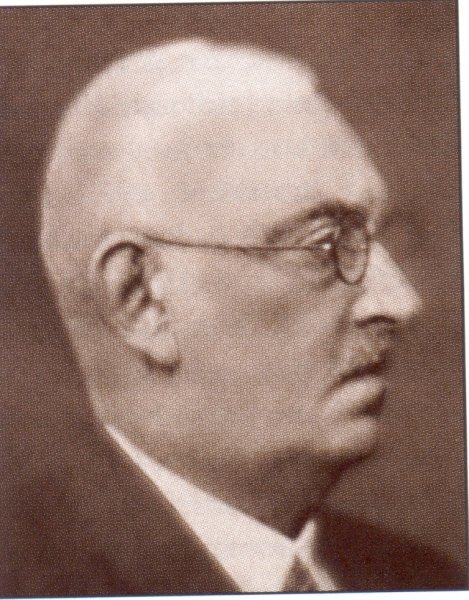

Personal details
- Born: 14 February 1870 Lviv, Austria-Hungary
- Died: 20 August 1942 (aged 72) Theresienstadt, Protectorate of Bohemia and Moravia
- Party: SDAPÖ; DSAP

Ludwig Czech (14 February 1870 – 20 August 1942) was a German-speaking Jewish Czech member of the German Social Democratic Workers' Party in the Czechoslovak Republic who actively participated in the Czechoslovak politics of the so-called First Republic. He was a Minister of Social Care (1929–1934). Minister of Public Affairs (1934–1935), Minister of Public Health and Physical Training (1935–1938). He died in the Theresienstadt Ghetto in 1942, officially having died of pneumonia, heart failure, and edema of the lungs.
