= Antonín Němec =

Czech politician and publicist (1858–1926)

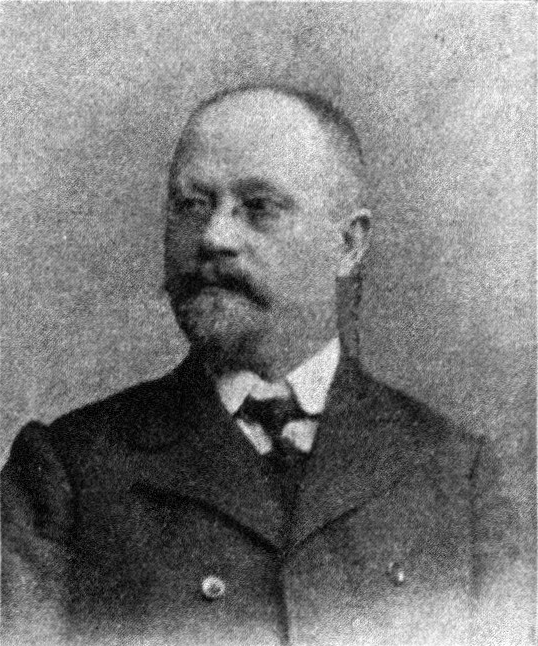
- Antonín Němec in 1907

Chairman of the Czechoslovak Social Democratic Party
- In office 1917–1924
- Preceded by: Bohumír Šmeral
- Succeeded by: Antonín Hampl
- In office 1905–1916
- Preceded by: Josef Steiner
- Succeeded by: Bohumír Šmeral

Member of the National Assembly of the Czechoslovak Socialist Republic
- In office 1920–1925

Member of the Revolutionary National Assembly
- In office 1918–1920

Member of the Imperial Council
- In office 1907–1918

Personal details
- Born: 15 January 1858 Brno, Moravia, Austrian Empire
- Died: 25 May 1926 (aged 68) Prague, Czechoslovakia
- Resting place: Olšany Cemetery
- Party: Czechoslovak Social Democratic Party
- Children: Arnoštka Piková
- Profession: Politician, writer, journalist, editor

Antonín Němec (15 January 1858 – 25 May 1926) was a Czech journalist and politician. He was a member of the National Assembly of the Czechoslovak Republic for the Czechoslovak Social Democratic Party and the long-time chairman of this political formation.

== Biography ==
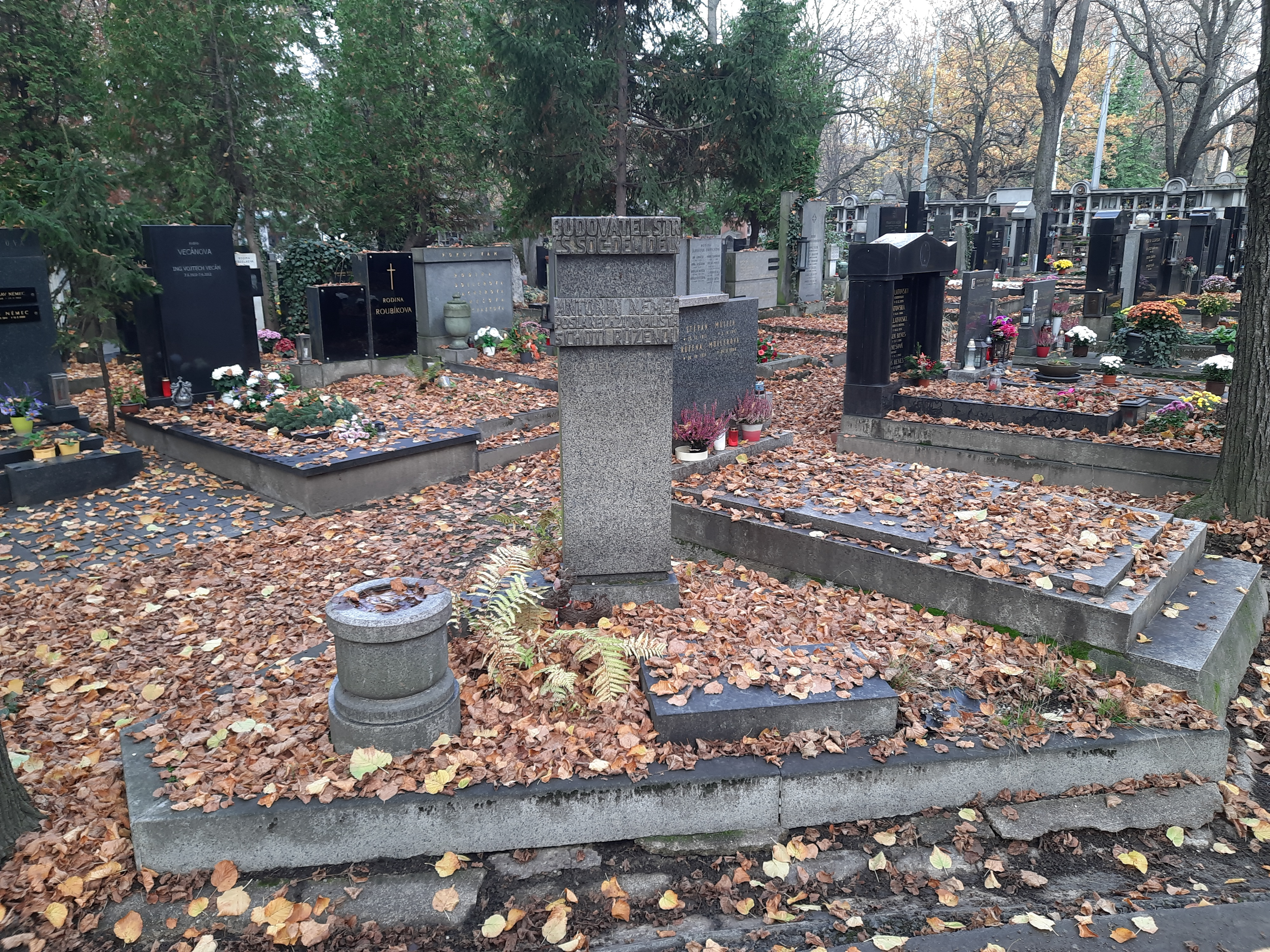
Grave of Antonín Němec

Němec was born on 15 January 1858 in Brno. He trained as a typographer. He was politically active under the Austro-Hungarian Empire. Already in the 1880s, he was one of the organizers of the social democratic movement in the ranks of the Brno textile workers. In 1886 he joined the editorial office of the Brno Socialist newspaper Rovnost, where he remained until 1894, then he was editor of the Workers' Newspapers in Vienna from 1894 to 1897.

In 1897, he wrote a speech in which the newly elected Czech Social Democratic MPs of the Austrian Reichsrat opposed the state-law positions of non-socialist Czech political parties (the so-called anti-state declaration), which caused sharp controversies in Czech society. From 1897 to 1907 he was editor-in-chief of the People's Rights, then his publisher. Since 1900, when the headquarters of the Czech (Czechoslovak) Social Democrats was transferred from Vienna to Prague as the head of the party.

In the elections to the Reichsrat in 1907, he became a member of the Reichsrat (national Parliament), where he was elected for the district of Bohemia 007. He sat down in the parliamentary faction of the Club of the Czech Social Democrats. He was re-elected as well as in the elections to the Imperial Council of 1911 and remained in the Vienna Parliament until the end of the monarchy.

In 1899, at the 7th Congress of the All-Austrian Social Democratic Party in Brno, he participated in the formulation of a national program in which the party promoted the federalization and democratization of Austria.

From 1905 he was the chairman of the Social-Democracy, but after 1914 his influence temporarily fell at the expense of Bohumír Šmeral, who also temporarily replaced him temporarily between 1916 and 1917 – in 1917, the German came to the fore again as part of the so-called national opposition, which accentuated the Czech national and state-law interest, when, on the contrary, Šmeral’s pro-Austrian attitudes were subjected to criticism. Earlier, in June 1917, the German held a meeting in Stockholm in the delegation of the Czech Social Democrats as part of the so-called Peace Congress of the Second International. It was an attempt at a peaceful agreement of the socialist parties, organized by the Social Democrats from neutral states. The memorandum, which in connection with this congress was articulated by the Czech Social Democrats, but on the contrary showed the strengthening of nationally Czech elements in the party's policy. The memorandum was asked for the transformation of the Austro-Hungarian Empire into the national unit federation, with the merging of the Czech lands and Slovakia. The Social-Democrats thus abandoned the original concept of personnel autonomy in favor of the territorially defined border of the monarchy. Thanks to the shift of the Czech Social Democracy towards the more national and less Marxist conception of politics, the positions of social democracy and national social services (Czech socialists) became close at the end of the First World War. Both sides thus created a free coordinating body in September 1918 by the Socialist Council, in whose thirteen-member leadership the German sat down. In 1918, he became vice-chairman of the National Committee of the Czechoslovak National Committee.

From 1918 to 1920 he met in the Czechoslovak Revolutionary National Assembly. In the 1920 parliamentary elections, he won a seat of the National Assembly.In the course of the events of 1920, when the party split on the left and right, he opposed the Bolshevik left and, as a formal owner of the People's House in Prague, prevented the left from controlling this party headquarters. Until 1924 (according to other sources in 1925), he was the chairman of the Social Democratic Party, then until his death as an honorary chairman. In the 1920s, he was an unequivocal supporter of the active participation of the Social-Democrats in the governments of Czechoslovakia.

He died in 1926 in Prague. He was cremated and buried in the Olšany Cemetery.

== Printer ==
Since he trained as a typographer, he founded his own printer, based in Prague's Hybernská Street No. 7. He published newspapers for the Czechoslovak Social-Democratic Party, specifically the Right of the People and the Evening of the Rights of the People. In addition to these newspapers, he also printed communist newspapers, such as Rudé právo and Sower.
