= 1920 Czechoslovak parliamentary election =

18 and 25 April 1920	1925 →
- Chamber of Deputies
- 281 of the 300 seats in the Chamber of Deputies; 141 seats needed for a majority
Party	Leader	Vote %	Seats
ČSDSD	Antonín Němec	25.65	74
ČSL	Jan Šrámek	11.29	33
DSAP	Josef Seliger	11.12	31
RSZML	Antonín Švehla	9.74	28
ČSNS	Václav Klofáč	8.08	24
ČsND	Karel Kramář	6.25	19
DNP–DNSAP	Ernst Storch	5.30	15
SNRS	Pavel Blaho	3.91	12
BdL	Franz Křepek	3.90	11
DCVP		3.43	10
OKSZP	Jenő Lelley	2.25	5
ČŽOS	Rudolf Mlčoch	1.98	6
UDPS		1.75	4
DDFP		1.70	5
SSČLP	František Modráček	0.94	3
OMKFP		0.43	1
This lists parties that won seats. See the complete results below.
- Senate
- All 142 seats in the Senate; 82 seats needed for a majority
Party	Leader	Vote %	Seats
ČSDSD	Antonín Němec	28.07	41
ČSL	Jan Šrámek	11.91	18
DSAP	Josef Seliger	11.35	16
RSZML	Antonín Švehla	10.15	14
ČSNS	Václav Klofáč	7.15	10
ČsND	Karel Kramář	6.78	10
DNP–DNSAP	Ernst Storch	5.75	8
BdL	Franz Křepek	4.03	6
SNRS	Pavel Blaho	3.47	6
DCVP		2.70	4
ČŽOS	Rudolf Mlčoch	2.06	3
OKSZP	Jenő Lelley	1.92	2
OMKFP		0.77	1
This lists parties that won seats. See the complete results below.
Chamber of Deputies results. Elections were not held in the bright yellow areas; in Ruthenia they were delayed until 1924 due to security concerns
Prime Minister before	Prime Minister after
Vlastimil Tusar; ČSDSD	Vlastimil Tusar; ČSDSD

Parliamentary elections were held in Czechoslovakia on 18 and 25 April 1920. Members of the Chamber of Deputies were elected on 18 April and members of the Senate on 25 April. The elections had initially been planned for mid- or late 1919, but had been postponed.

== Results ==
281 of the 300 Chamber of Deputies seats 281 were unfilled as elections were not held in Hlučín Region (part of the Moravská Ostrava electoral district, resulting in one less deputy being elected from that district), the Těšín electoral district (nine deputies) and the Užhorod electoral district (nine deputies). 16 parties won parliamentary representation. Voter turnout was 90% for the Chamber election and 76% for the Senate.

The Czechoslovak Social Democratic Workers' Party (ČSDSD) emerged as the largest party in the 1920 election, with 26% of the vote and 74 seats in the Chamber of Deputies and 28% of the vote and 41 seats in the Senate and 41 senators elected. Amongst the Czech voters, the 1920 election outcome was marked by remarkable stability compared to the 1911 election. The gap between Czech socialist and bourgeois parties had only moved by 0.4% compared to the 1911 result.

=== Chamber of Deputies ===
Party	Votes	%	Seats
Czechoslovak Social Democratic Workers' Party	1,590,520	25.65	74
Czechoslovak People's Party-Slovak People's Party	699,728	11.29	33
German Social Democratic Workers' Party	689,589	11.12	31
Republican Party of the Czechoslovak Countryside	603,618	9.74	28
Czechoslovak Socialist Party	500,821	8.08	24
Czechoslovak National Democracy	387,552	6.25	19
German National Party–German National Socialist Workers' Party	328,735	5.30	15
Slovak National and Peasant Party	242,045	3.90	12
Farmers' League	241,747	3.90	11
German Christian Social People's Party	212,913	3.43	10
Provincial Christian-Socialist Party	139,355	2.25	5
Czechoslovak Traders' Party	122,813	1.98	6
Hungarian-German Social Democratic Party	108,546	1.75	4
German Democratic Freedom Party	105,449	1.70	5
Associated Jewish Parties	79,714	1.29	0
Socialist Party of the Czechoslovak Working People	58,580	0.94	3
Party of Smallholders, Homeowners and Entrepreneurs of Czechoslovakia	42,670	0.69	0
Hungarian Provincial Party of Smallholders and Agrarians	26,520	0.43	1
German Free Social Party	7,630	0.12	0
Independent Party of Small People	5,252	0.08	0
Hungarian National Party	4,214	0.07	0
Slavic Socialist Party	2,024	0.03	0
Total	6,200,035	100.00	281
Registered voters/turnout	6,917,956	–	

=== Senate ===
Party	Votes	%	Seats
Czechoslovak Social Democratic Workers' Party	1,466,958	28.07	41
Czechoslovak People's Party-Slovak People's Party	622,406	11.91	18
German Social Democratic Workers' Party	593,344	11.35	16
Republican Party of the Czechoslovak Countryside	530,388	10.15	14
Czechoslovak Socialist Party	373,913	7.15	10
Czechoslovak National Democracy	354,561	6.78	10
German National Party–German National Socialist Workers' Party	300,287	5.75	8
Farmers' League	210,700	4.03	6
Slovak National and Peasant Party	181,289	3.47	6
German Christian Social People's Party	141,334	2.70	4
Czechoslovak Traders' Party	107,674	2.06	3
Provincial Christian-Socialist Party	100,658	1.93	2
Associated Jewish Parties	59,913	1.15	0
Hungarian Provincial Smallholders' and Farmers' Part	40,302	0.77	1
Party of Smallholders, Homeowners and Entrepreneurs of Czechoslovakia	21,931	0.42	0
German Democratic Freedom Party	21,199	0.41	3
Other German parties	96,904	1.85	3
Socialist Party of the Czechoslovak Working People	3,050	0.06	0
Total	5,226,811	100.00	142
Registered voters/turnout	6,917,956	–	
Source: Nohlen & Stöver,. Electoral Office

== See also ==
- List of members of the National Assembly of Czechoslovakia (1920–1925)
