= Hungarian National Party (Czechoslovakia) =

The Hungarian National Party (Hungarian: Magyar Nemzeti Párt, MNP, Czech: Maďarská národní strana, Slovak: Maďarská národná strana) was a political party representing ethnic Hungarians in the First Republic of Czechoslovakia.

The party was founded in February 1920 in Komárno under the name National Hungarian Smallholder and Farmer Party (Országos Magyar Kisgazda és Földműves Párt). From May 1925, it used the name National Hungarian Smallholders, Farmers and Small-business Party (Országos Magyar Kisgazda, Földműves és Kisiparos Párt), often abbreviated as the Hungarian Smallholders Party (Magyar Kisgazda Párt). In 1925, the name was changed to the Hungarian National Party (Magyar Nemzeti Párt). On June 21, 1936, the party merged with the Provincial Christian-Socialist Party (OKszP), another large Hungarian party, into the United Hungarian Party (Egyesült Magyar Párt, EMP) led by János Esterházy as national executive chairman (until then leader of OKszP) and Andor Jaross as national chairman.

The main objective of the party was initially an autonomy for ethnically Hungarian parts in Slovakia. This stance was later revised, and the party advocated a revision of the Trianon Treaty. In the economic sphere, the party advocated free market and called for government support for smallholders and peasants.

After establishment of the Slovak State in 1939, which had about 65,000 ethnic Hungarians, the party, under the name of the Hungarian Party in Slovakia (Szlovenskói Magyar Párt), remained as one of few allowed political parties alongside the ruling Hlinka's Slovak People's Party and the German minority German Party. During Slovak National Uprising (1944) the party was banned on the area controlled by insurgents. The ban was reconfirmed after the end of World War II.

== Election results ==
Chamber of Deputies
Date	Votes			Seats		Position	Size
Date	No.	%	± pp	No.	±	Position	Size
1920	26,520	0.43	New	1 / 281	New	Extra-parliamentary	18th
1925	571,765	8.04	▲7.61	24 / 300	▲11	Extra-parliamentary	6th
1929	257,372	3.49	▼4.55	9 / 300	▲5	Extra-parliamentary	12th
1935	291,837	3.55	▲0.6	9 / 300	▲0	Extra-parliamentary	11th

Senate
Date	Votes			Seats		Position	Size
Date	No.	%	± pp	No.	±	Position	Size
1920	40,302	0.77	New	1 / 142	New	Extra-parliamentary	15th

== Literature ==
- Publications by historian Ladislav Deák (Slovak Academy of Sciences).
