= Provincial Christian-Socialist Party =

Provincial Christian-Socialist Party Országos Keresztényszocialista Párt
- Abbreviation: OKszP
- Leader: Géza Szüllő; János Esterházy
- Founded: 23 November 1919
- Dissolved: 21 June 1936
- Merged into: United Hungarian Party
- Ideology: Political Catholicism; Hungarian irredentism Christian socialism Anti-communism
- Political position: Right-wing
- Colours: Green

The Provincial Christian-Socialist Party (Hungarian: Országos Keresztényszocialista Párt, OKszP; Czech: Zemská křesťansko-socialistická strana; German: Provinziell-Christlich-Sozialistische Partei) was the main political party of ethnic Hungarians in the First Czechoslovak Republic.

It was founded on 23 November 1919 in Košice, by the merger of Catholic associations from Bratislava and Košice, but the first party convention took place in Bratislava in March 1920. Its two main programmatic goals was the implementation of Slovak autonomy and the defence of the Christian ideology against communism. Its first leaders was Lajos Körmendy‐Ékes, a great landowner from Košice, B. Toszt, a canon also from Košice, and Jenő Lelley, a lawyer from Nitra.

Initially, there were two tendencies inside the party, one in favour of a closer cooperation with the Slovak People's Party, which had refused in 1921 to renew the 1920 electoral alliance with the Czechoslovak People's Party, and another keener to engage in narrower contacts with the Czechoslovak People's Party, a member of the government coalition in Prague.

Lelley was a partisan of the second option, but after a few years he lost the internal battle and was expelled from the party with his followers. They went to the 1925 parliamentary elections under the name West Slovak Christian Socialist Party (Hungarian: Nyugat-szlovenskói keresztény-szocialista párt, German: Westslowakische Christlichsoziale Partei, Czech: Západoslovenská křesťansko-sociální strana) but got only 17,285 votes, not enough for a parliamentary seat.

On 21 June 1936 the party merged with the Hungarian National Party into Egyesült Magyar Párt (EMP, United Hungarian Party) led by János Esterházy as national executive chairman (until then leader of OKszP) and Andor Jaross as national chairman.

== Electoral results ==
- 1920: 139,355 votes, 2.3% - 5 seats (leader: Jenő Lelley Lelley) as the Hungarian and German Christian‐Socialist Party (Hungarian: Magyar és Német Keresztényszocialista Párt, German: Magyarisch-deutsche christlichsoziale Partei, Czech: Maďarsko-německá křesťansko-sociální strana) like its Social Democratic counterpart
- 1925: 98,383 votes, 1.4% - 4 seats (leader: Géza Szüllő)
- 1929: 257,231 votes, 3.5% - 9 seats (leader: Janos Esterházy) in an electoral coalition with the Hungarian National Party and the German Party of the Zips
- 1935: 291,831 votes, 3.6% - 9 seats (leader: Géza Szüllö) in the same electoral coalition as in 1929
