= Republican Party of Farmers and Peasants =

Republican Party of Farmers and Peasants Czech: Republikánská strana zemědělského a malorolnického lidu Slovak: Republikánska strana zemedelského a maloroľníckeho ľudu
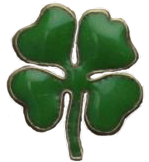
- Leader: Stanislav Kubr; Josef Žďárský; Antonín Švehla; Rudolf Beran
- Founded: 6 January 1899
- Dissolved: 22 November 1938
- Merged into: Party of National Unity
- Headquarters: Prague, Bohemia, Czechoslovakia
- Newspaper: Venkov
- Think tank: Association of Agrarian Academics
- Youth wing: Republican Youth of Czechoslovak Countryside
- Membership (1936): 670 000
- Ideology: Agrarianism; Conservatism
- Political position: Centre-right
- International affiliation: Green International
- Colours: Green

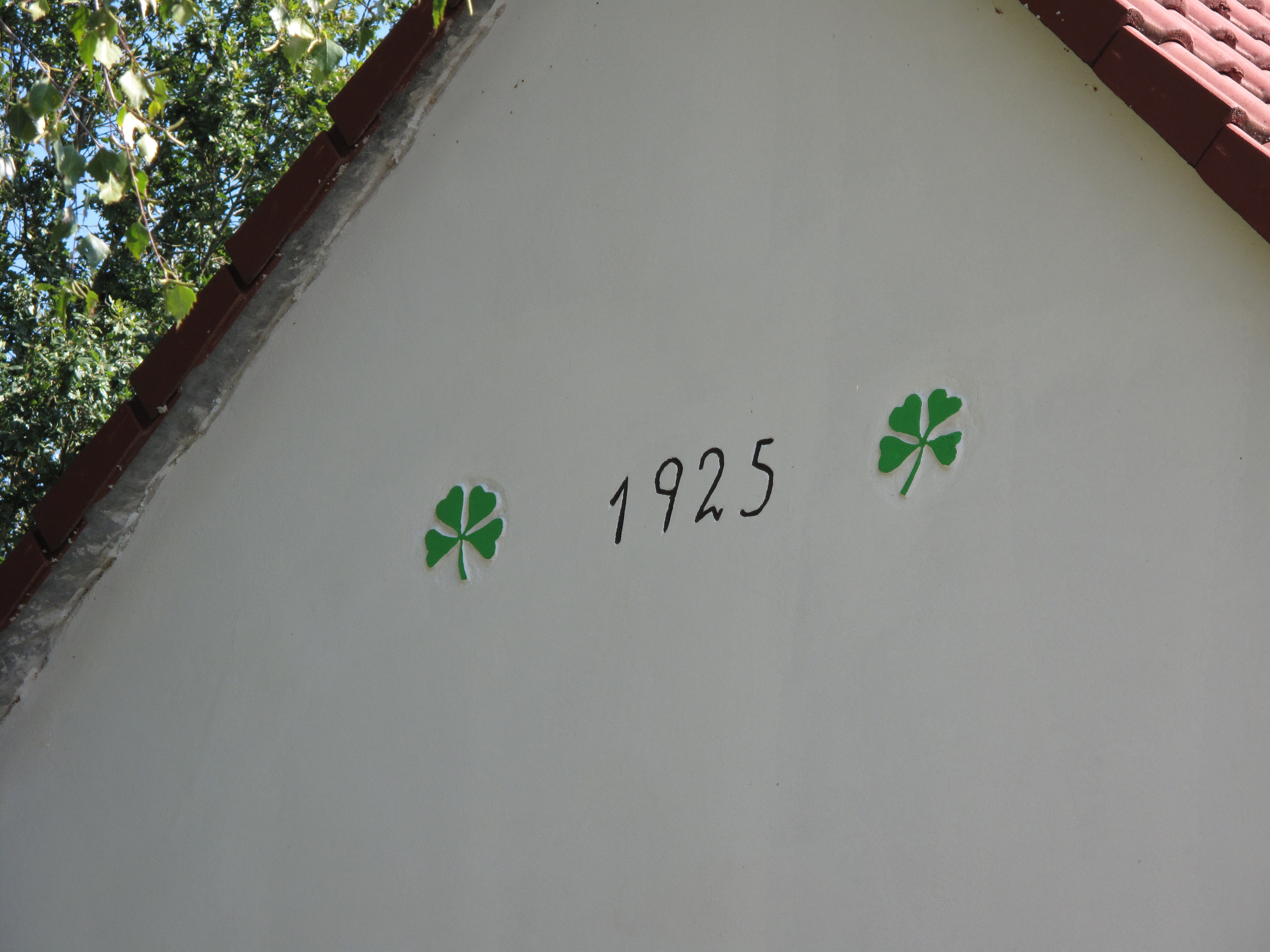
Cloverleaf – symbol of the party

The Republican Party of Farmers and Peasants (Czech: Republikánská strana zemědělského a malorolnického lidu, Slovak: Republikánska strana zemedelského a maloroľníckeho ľudu, RSZML) was a centre-right agrarian party of Czechoslovakia, seen as representing big business and agriculture. In the period up to 1935 it was the biggest and most influential political party in the country. Led by Antonín Švehla and Milan Hodža, the party influenced Czechoslovak politics between World War I and World War II. It participated in the Pětka coalition governments, and it was a member of the International Agrarian Bureau.

== History ==
The party was established in 1922 as a merger of the Czech Agrarian Party and the Slovak National Republican and Peasant Party. In the 1925 elections it won 45 of the 300 seats in the Chamber of Deputies, becoming the largest party in Parliament. In the same year it introduced an agrarian tariff which was seen as protecting the producers interest, motivated by the country's agrarian crisis. It is argued that it helped the Hungarians more than it did the Slovaks. Prime Minister Udržal was a member of the party, but he lost its support, which meant that he failed to hold his coalition together. Internal struggles within the party grew and the coalition government failed in July 1932. It was consistently the strongest party, forming and dominating coalitions. It moved beyond its original agrarian base to reach middle-class voters.

Other important figures were Josef Žďářský (Party President 1905–1909), Antonín Švehla (Party President 1909-1933 and Prime Minister 1922–1926, 1926–1929), František Udržal (Prime Minister 1929–1932), Jan Malypetr (Prime Minister 1932–1935) and Milan Hodža (Prime Minister 1935–1938) as well as Rudolf Beran (Party President 1935-1938 and Prime Minister 1938–1939).

The party was not allowed to reorganize after World War II.

== Electoral results ==
Chamber of Deputies
Election year	# of overall votes	% of overall vote	# of overall seats won	+/–	Leader	Position
1920	603,618 (#4)	9.74	28 / 281	–	Karel Prášek	Government
1925	970,498 (#1)	13.66	45 / 300	▲17	Antonín Švehla	Government
1929	1,105,498 (#1)	15.0	46 / 300	▲1	Antonín Švehla	Government
1935	1,176,628 (#2)	14.3	45 / 300	▼1	Rudolf Beran	Government

Senate
Election year	# of overall votes	% of overall vote	# of overall seats won	+/–	Leader
1920	530,388 (#4)	10.15	14 / 142	–	Karel Prášek
1925	841,647 (#1)	13.8	23 / 150	▲9	Antonín Švehla
1929	978,291 (#1)	15.2	24 / 150	▲1	Antonín Švehla
1935	1,042,924 (#2)	14.3	23 / 150	▼1	Rudolf Beran

== Bibliography ==
- "Between Interest Representation and Governingthrough Parliamentary Democracy" (2000). Slavic Research Center, Hokkaido University, 11 Sept. 2007
- Janos, Andrew C. East Central Europe. Stanford, CA: Stanford UP, 2000.
- Miroslav Mareš, Pavel Pšeja. Agrarian and Peasant Parties in the Czech Republic: History, Presence and Central European Context
