= List of political parties in Czechoslovakia =

This article lists all of the political parties in Czechoslovakia (1918–1992).

== Political parties ==
=== Political parties in the First Czechoslovak Republic (1918–1938) ===
==== Czechoslovak parties (Main) ====
Logo	Party name	Abbr.	Political Position	Ideology
	Communist Party of Czechoslovakia	KSČ	Left-wing to Far-left	Communism; Socialism with a human face Marxism–Leninism
	Czechoslovak Social Democratic Workers' Party	ČSDSD	Center-left to Left-wing	Social democracy Left-wing populism
	Czechoslovak National Social Party	ČSNS	Center-left	Popular socialism Czechoslovakism; Social liberalism
	Czechoslovak Traders' Party	ČŽOS	Center-right to Right-wing	Liberalism; Conservatism; Economic Nationalism
Historical logo of the Czechoslovak People's Party (1935)	Czechoslovak People's Party	ČSL	Center-right	Christian democracy Social conservatism
	Republican Party of Farmers and Peasants	RSZML	Center-right	Agrarianism; Conservatism
	Hlinka's Slovak People's Party	HSĽS	Far-right	Slovak Clerical Fascism
	Slovak National and Peasant Party	SNS	Right-wing	Slovak nationalism National conservatism Autonomism
	Czechoslovak National Democracy	ČsND	Right-wing	National liberalism National conservatism Czechoslovak Nationalism
	National Unification	NSj	Right-wing to Far-right	National conservatism Czechoslovak nationalism Agrarianism
	National Fascist Community	NOF	Far-right	Fascism; Antisemitism; Anti-communism; Anti-Hungarian sentiment Pan-Slavism

==== German parties ====
Sudeten German

Logo	Party name	Abbr.	Political Position	Ideology
	German Social Democratic Workers' Party	DSAP	Center-left to left-wing	German minority interests Social democracy Democratic socialism Activism
Flag of Farmers' League	Farmers' League	BdL	Center to center-right	Agrarianism; Conservatism; German nationalism Activism
	Sudeten German Party	SdP	Far-right	Nazism: German nationalism; Pan-Germanism; Volksgemeinschaft; Negativism
	German Christian Social People's Party	DCVP	Center-right to right-wing	Conservatism; Political Catholicism; Activism
	Sudeten German Rural League	SdLB	Far-right	German nationalism Antisemitism; Agrarianism; Negativism
	German National Party	DNP	Right-wing	German nationalism Negativism
	German National Socialist Workers' Party	DNSAP	Far-right	Nazism: Pan-Germanism; German nationalism; Anti-Marxism; Volksgemeinschaft; Negativism

Other

- German Electoral Coalition – coalition out of BdL, DAWG and KdP
- Communist Party of Czechoslovakia (German Division) – part of the KSČ
- Hungarian-German Social Democratic Party – social democratic, Carpathian German minority rights
- Zipser German Party – Carpathian German minority rights
- Carpathian German Party (KdP) – Carpathian German minority rights
- German Free Social Party (DDFP) – social liberal, activist
- German Traders' Party – liberal, activist
- German Labour and Economic Community (DAWG) – liberal, activist

==== Hungarian parties ====
- Hungarian-German Social Democratic Party (MNSD) – social democratic
- West Slovak Christian Socialist Party (NKS) – Christian democratic
- Provincial Christian-Socialist Party (OKSZP) – Christian democratic, nationalist
- United Hungarian Party – successor of OKSZP and MNP, nationalist
- Hungarian National Party (MNP) – nationalist

==== Ruthenian parties ====
- Marxist Left in Slovakia and the Transcarpathian Ukraine – communist
- Socialist League of the New East – narodist
- Social Democratic Workers' Party in Subcarpathian Rus' – social democratic, ukrainophile, partner of ČSDSD
- Carpatho-Russian Labour Party of Small Peasants and Landless – narodnist, russophile, partner of ČSNS
- Ruthenian Peasants Party – Christian democratic, agrarian, ukrainophile, partner of ČSL
- Autonomous Agrarian Union – agrarian, russophile
- Russian National Party – russophile, partner of ČsND
- Russian National Autonomous Party – fascist, russophile

==== Jewish parties ====
- Jewish Party – Zionist
- Jewish Republican Party – successor of Jewish Economic Party, Haredi, agrarian, partner of RSZML
- Jewish Economic Party – successor of Jewish Conservative Party, Haredi, agrarian, partner of RSZML
- Jewish Conservative Party – Haredi

==== Lechite parties ====
- Polish Socialist Workers Party (PSPR) – socialist
- Silesian People's Party – Silesian separatist
- Polish People's Party (PSL) – agrarian socialist
- Union of Silesian Catholics in the Czechoslovak Republic – Christian democratic

Other

- Marxist Left in Slovakia and the Transcarpathian Ukraine – communist
- Communist Party of Czechoslovakia (Leninists) – communist (Right Opposition)
- Independent Communist Party – communist
- Independent Socialist Workers Party
- Socialist Association
- Independent Radical Social Democratic Party
- Socialist Party of the Czechoslovak Working People – socialist
- Party of Moderate Progress Within the Bounds of Law
- Baťovci – regionalist
- National Labour Party – liberal
- National People's Party (NSL) – Christian democratic
- Czechoslovak Agrarian and Conservative Party – conservative splitter group from RSZML
- Juriga's Slovak People's Party – Christian Slovak nationalist
- Vlajka – fascist

=== Political parties created in the Second Czechoslovak Republic (1938–1939) ===
- German People's Group in Czecho-Slovakia
- National Labour Party (1938) (NSP)
- Party of National Unity (SNJ)

=== Political parties created in the Third Czechoslovak Republic (1944–1948) ===
- Democratic Party (DS)
- Communist Party of Slovakia (KSS)
- Freedom Party (SS)
- Labour Party (SP)

=== Political parties in Communist Czechoslovakia (1948–1989) ===
- National Front of Czechs and Slovaks

Communist Party of Czechoslovakia (KSČ)
Communist Party of Slovakia (KSS)
Czechoslovak People's Party (ČSL)
Czechoslovak Socialist Party (ČSS)
Freedom Party (SS)
Party of Slovak Revival (SSO)

- Club of Committed Non-Party Members (1968)

=== Political parties created in the Czech and Slovak Federative Republic (1989–1992) ===
- Civic Democratic Party (Czech Republic) (ODS)
- Civic Democratic Party (Slovakia) (ODS)
- Christian Democratic Party (KDS)
- Christian Democratic Movement (KDH)
- Civic Forum (OF)
- Civic Movement (OH)
- Civic Democratic Alliance (ODA)
- Conservative Party (KS)
- Club of Committed Non-Party Members (KAN)
- Christian and Democratic Union (KDU)
- Movement for a Democratic Slovakia (HZDS)
- Friends of Beer Party (SPP)
- Public Against Violence (VPN)
- Civic Democratic Union (ODÚ)
- Party of the Democratic Left (Slovakia) (SDĽ)
- Party of the Democratic Left (Czech Republic) (SDL)
- Peasants' Party of Slovakia (RSS)
- Pensioners' Movement for Life Security (HDŽJ)
- Liberal-Social Union (LSU)
- Rally for the Republic – Republican Party of Czechoslovakia (SPR–RSČ)
- Communist Party of Bohemia and Moravia (KSČM)
- Communist Party of Slovakia (KSS)
- Union of Communists of Slovakia (ZKS)
- Communist Party of Slovakia – 91 (KSS '91)
- Coexistence (political party)
- The Czech Crown (Monarchist Party of Bohemia, Moravia and Silesia) (KČ)
- Hungarian Christian Democratic Movement (MKDM)
- Hungarian Civic Party (MOS)
- Green Party (Czech Republic) (SZ)
- Green Party (Slovakia) (SZ)
- Association of Radicals for the United States of Europe (AR)
- Masaryk Democratic Party (MDS)
- Movement for Autonomous Democracy–Party for Moravia and Silesia (HSD–SMS)
- Slovak National Party (SNS)
- Democratic Labour Party (DSP)
- Liberal Democratic Party (LDS)
- Party of the National Unification of Slovaks (SNZS)
- Party of Moravian Countryside (SMV)
- Moravian-Silesian Movement (MSH)
- Moravian Civic Movement (MOH)
- Moravian National Party (MNS)
- Czechoslovak Social Democracy (ČSSD)
- Social Democratic Party of Slovakia (SDSS)
- Roma Civic Initiative (ROI)

== See also ==
- List of political parties in the Czech Republic
- List of political parties in Slovakia
