= 1929 Czechoslovak parliamentary election =

← 1925	27 October 1929	1935 →
- Chamber of Deputies
- All 300 seats in the Chamber of Deputies; 151 seats needed for a majority
Party	Leader	Vote %	Seats	+/–
RSZML	Antonín Švehla	14.97	46	+1
ČSDSD	Antonín Hampl	13.05	39	+10
ČSNS	Václav Klofáč	10.39	32	+4
KSČ	Klement Gottwald	10.2	30	−11
ČSL	Jan Šrámek	8.44	25	−6
DSAP	Ludwig Czech	6.86	21	+4
HSĽS	Andrej Hlinka	5.76	19	−4
German Coalition	Franz Spina	5.37	16	New
ČsND	Karel Kramář	4.87	15	+2
DCVP–PGD–WSdM	Karl Hilgenreiner	4.71	14	+1
ČŽOS	Rudolf Mlčoch	3.94	12	−1
OKSZP–MNP–ZDP	Janos Esterházy	3.49	9	+5
DNSAP	Hans Knirsch	2.76	8	+1
DNP–SdLB		2.56	7	−3
ZWPSZ		1.42	4	New
LPVKL	Radola Gajda	0.96	3	New
This lists parties that won seats. See the complete results below.
- Senate
- All 150 seats in the Senate; 76 seats needed for a majority
Party	Leader	Vote %	Seats	+/–
RSZML	Antonín Švehla	15.17	24	+1
ČSDSD	Antonín Hampl	13.04	20	+6
ČSNS	Václav Klofáč	10.33	16	+2
KSČ	Klement Gottwald	10	15	−5
ČSL	Jan Šrámek	8.68	13	−3
DSAP	Ludwig Czech	6.93	11	+2
HSĽS	Andrej Hlinka	5.85	9	−3
German Coalition	Franz Spina	5.57	9	New
ČsND	Karel Kramář	5.04	8	+1
DCVP	Karl Hilgenreiner	4.86	8	+1
ČŽOS	Rudolf Mlčoch	4.25	6	0
OKSZP	Janos Esterházy	3.62	6	+4
DNSAP	Hans Knirsch	2.65	4	+1
LPVKL	Radola Gajda	0.8	1	New
This lists parties that won seats. See the complete results below.
Prime Minister before	Prime Minister after
František Udržal; RSZML	František Udržal; RSZML

Parliamentary elections were held in Czechoslovakia on 27 October 1929. The Republican Party of Farmers and Peasants, emerged as the largest party, winning 46 seats in the Chamber of Deputies and 24 seats in the Senate. Voter turnout was 90.2% in the Chamber election and 78.8% for the Senate. The rightward shift of the 1925 elections was reversed, with moderate centre-left groups (Social Democrats and Czechoslovak National Socialists) increasing their vote shares whilst the Communist Party suffered a set-back.

== Background ==
The 1929 election took place at a time of relative prosperity, just before the Great Depression.

The Communist Party was the sole multinational political party in the country at the time. It had emerged as a major force in the 1925 election and had around 150,000 members in 1928. In 1929 leadership shifted to a younger generation and a major purge of party ranks took place.

The Czechoslovak National Democrats contested the election in Slovakia together with the Slovak National Party led by Martin Rázus. Nevertheless, relations between Rázus and the leader of the National Democrats in Slovakia Milan Ivanka were strained, as the former was fiercely autonomist and the latter a strong supporter of Czechoslovak nationhood.

In Slovakia, Hlinka's Slovak People's Party resigned from the coalition government on 8 October 1929. The move followed a long controversy around the legal case of the party newspaper editor Vojtech Tuka, who was sentenced for espionage and treason on 5 October 1929. The Tuka affair had resulted in an internal rift in the party, with the expelled anti-Tuka faction (led by Juriga and Tománek) setting up their own Juriga's Slovak People's Party.

== Results ==
Hlinka's Slovak People's Party saw a decline compared to the 1925 vote, being reduced from 23 seats to 19. One interpretation is that two years of government participation without achieving Slovak autonomy had weakened the party. Moreover, the party had an ambiguous stance during the Tuka affair. The Juriga faction failed to make any impact in the election.

The Czechoslovak Social Democrats won five seats from Slovakia, an increase by three seats compared to the 1925 election. The Communist Party on the other hand retreated from 5 seats in Slovakia, compared to 8 seats in 1925. Magyar and German parties won 9 seats from Slovakia.

The Czechoslovak National Socialists, which lacked widespread support in the area, managed to win two seat from Slovakia. This was the best result for the party in Slovakia during the years of the First Republic. Another Czech party trying to build a base in Slovakia was the Czechoslovak People's Party, which managed to get its local leader Martin Mičura elected.

The Jewish Party, which had failed to win representation in 1925, managed to win two seats through an alliance with three Polish parties. Its deputies were Ludvík Singer from Bohemia and Julius Reiz from Slovakia.

General Radola Gajda's list ('League against Bound Tickets'), which called for the formation of a corporativist state, failed to make a major headway but won three seats (Gajda, Jiří Stříbrný and Karel Pergler). Gajda's political line was fascist, anti-Semitic and anti-German.

=== Senate ===
Party	Votes	%	Seats	+/–
Republican Party of Farmers and Peasants	978,291	15.17	24	+1
Czechoslovak Social Democratic Workers' Party	841,331	13.04	20	+6
Czechoslovak National Socialist Party	666,607	10.33	16	+2
Communist Party of Czechoslovakia	644,896	10.00	15	–5
Czechoslovak People's Party	559,700	8.68	13	–3
German Social Democratic Workers' Party	446,940	6.93	11	+2
Hlinka's Slovak People's Party	377,498	5.85	9	–3
German Electoral Coalition	359,002	5.57	9	New
Czechoslovak National Democracy	325,023	5.04	8	+1
German Christian Social People's Party	313,544	4.86	8	+1
Czechoslovak Traders' Party	274,085	4.25	6	0
Provincial Christian-Socialist Party	233,772	3.62	6	+4
German National Socialist Workers' Party	171,181	2.65	4	+1
German National Party	166,718	2.58	0	–5
League Against Bound Tickets	51,617	0.80	1	New
Electoral Union of Polish and Jewish Parties	27,823	0.43	0	New
Provincial Party of Smallholders, Entrepreneurs and Workers	6,691	0.10	0	New
Juriga's Slovak People's Party	5,782	0.09	0	New
Total	6,450,501	100.00	150	0
Registered voters/turnout	8,183,462	–		
Source: Nohlen & Stöver, Statistical Office

=== Chamber of Deputies ===
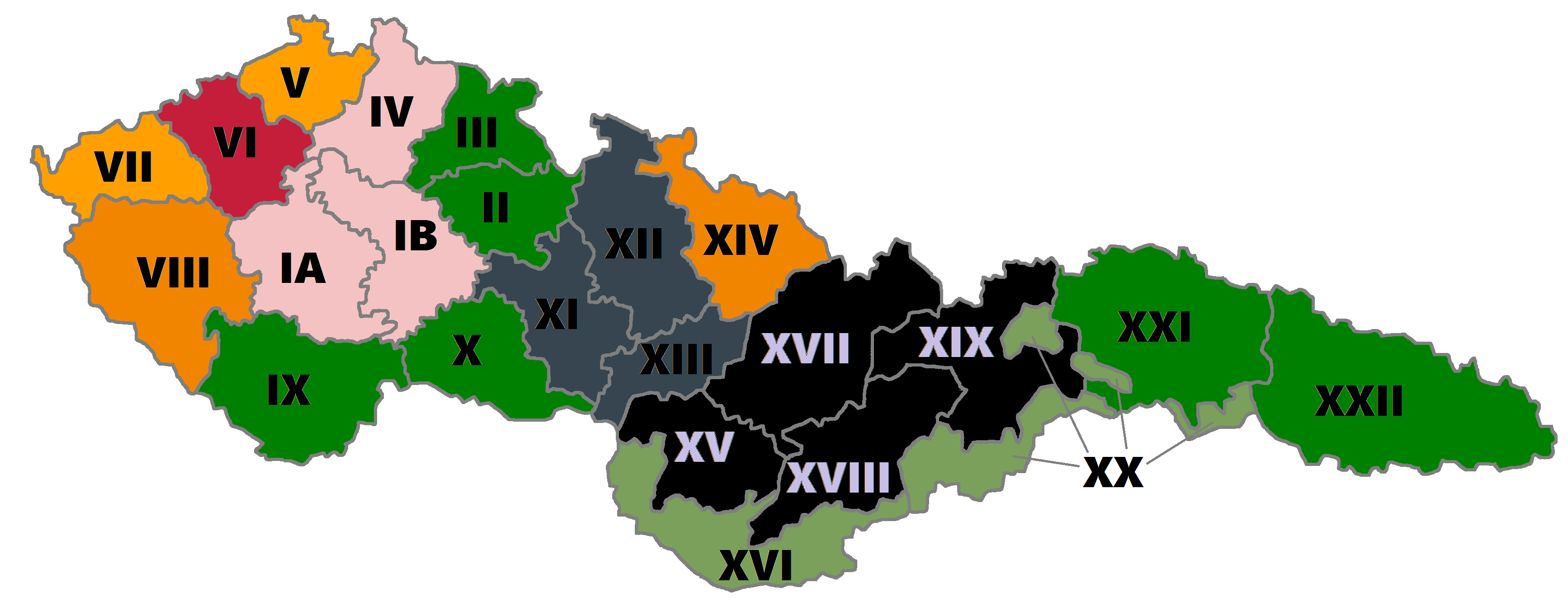
Most voted party per electoral district

Party	Votes	%	Seats	+/–
Republican Party of Farmers and Peasants	1,105,498	14.97	46	+1
Czechoslovak Social Democratic Workers' Party	963,462	13.05	39	+10
Czechoslovak National Socialist Party	767,328	10.39	32	+4
Communist Party of Czechoslovakia	753,220	10.20	30	–11
Czechoslovak People's Party	623,340	8.44	25	–6
German Social Democratic Workers' Party	506,761	6.86	21	+4
Hlinka's Slovak People's Party	425,051	5.76	19	–4
German Electoral Coalition	396,454	5.37	16	New
Czechoslovak National Democracy	359,547	4.87	15	+2
DCVP–PGD–WSdM	348,066	4.71	14	+1
Czechoslovak Traders' Party	291,209	3.94	12	–1
OKSZP–MNP–ZDP	257,372	3.49	9	+5
German National Socialist Workers' Party	204,110	2.76	8	+1
DNP–SdLB	189,187	2.56	7	–3
Electoral Union of Polish and Jewish Parties	104,556	1.42	4	New
League Against Bound Tickets	70,850	0.96	3	New
Provincial Party of Smallholders, Entrepreneurs and Workers	6,901	0.09	0	0
All German People's Party for Bohemia, Moravia and Silesia	6,672	0.09	0	New
Juriga's Slovak People's Party	5,395	0.07	0	New
Total	7,384,979	100.00	300	0
Valid votes	7,384,979	98.53		
Invalid/blank votes	110,024	1.47		
Total votes	7,495,003	100.00		
Registered voters/turnout	8,957,572	83.67		
Source: Nohlen & Stöver, Manuel Statistique

==== By province ====
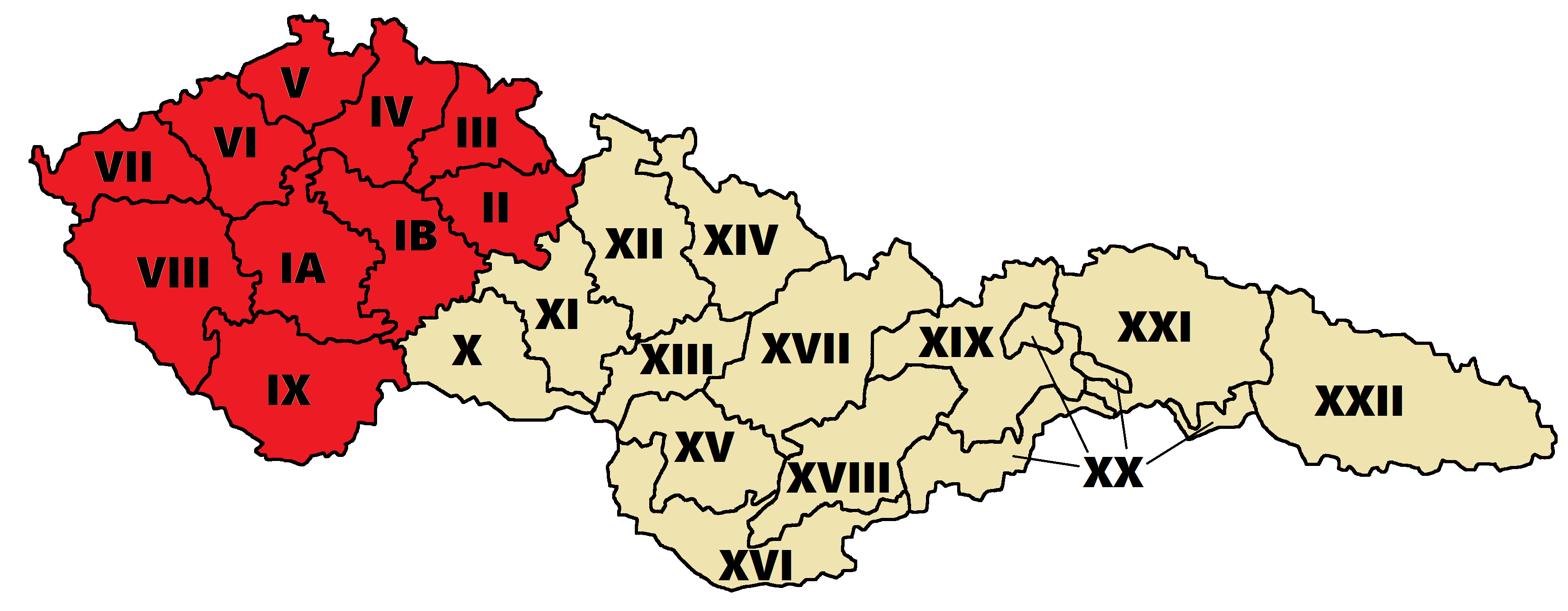
Bohemia Electoral districts I-IX 160 seats

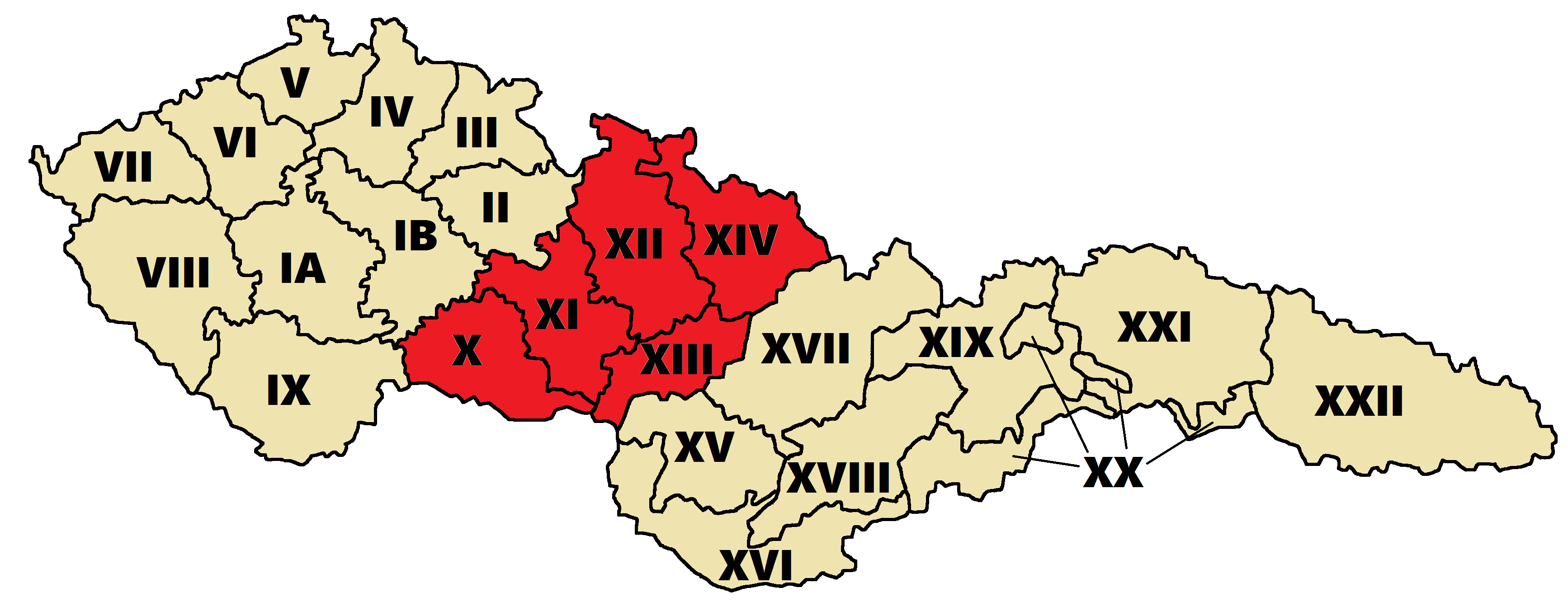
Moravia-Silesia Electoral districts X-XIV 70 seats

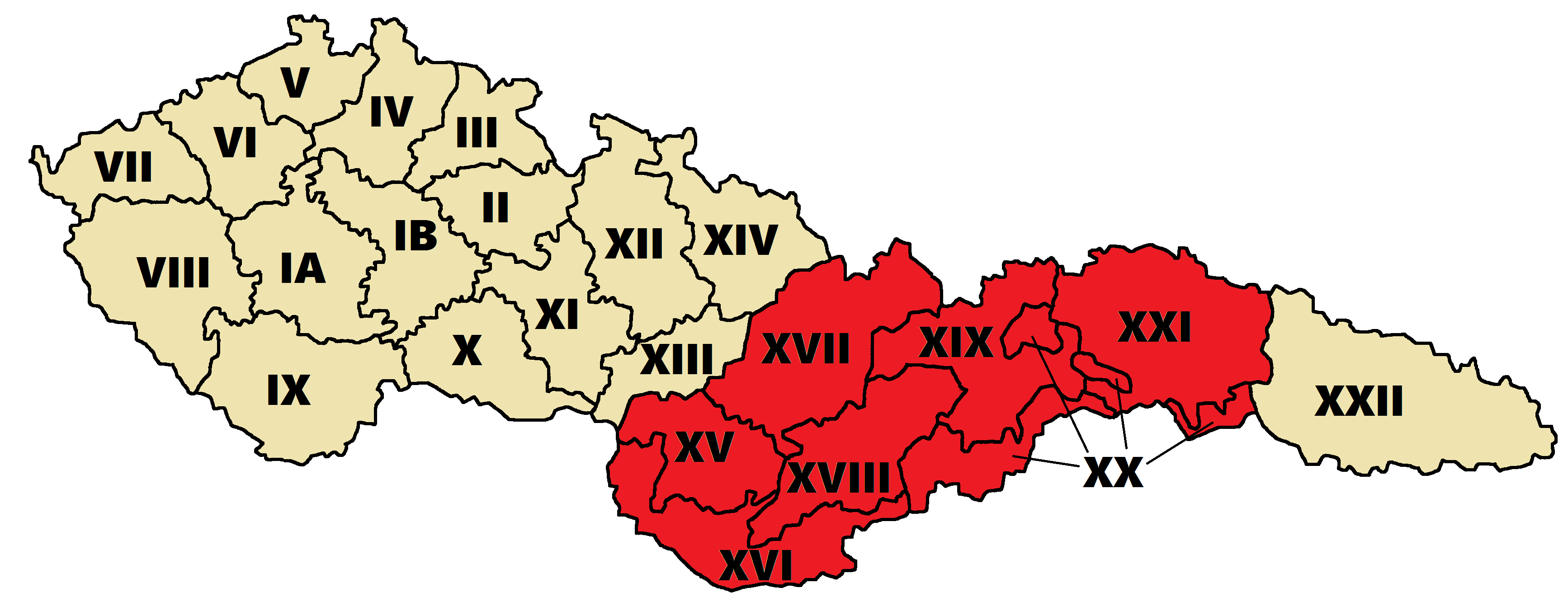
Slovakia Electoral districts XV-XXI 61 seats

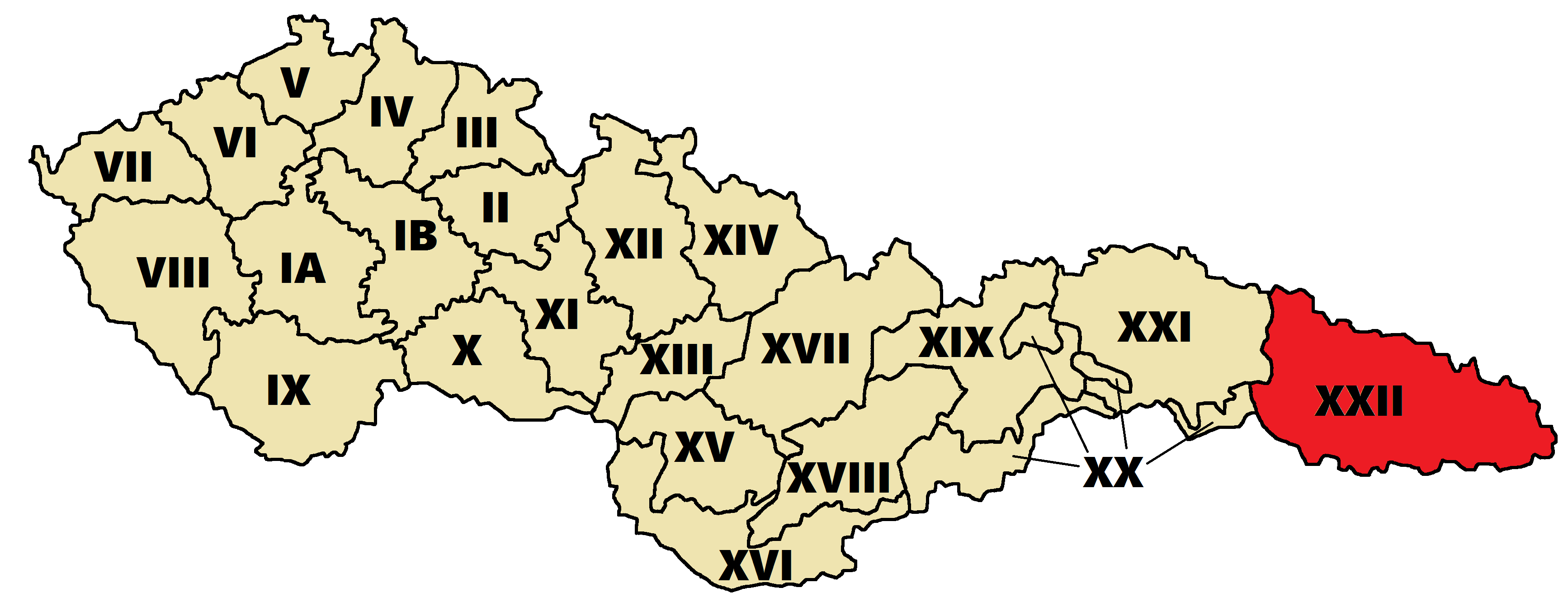
Subcarpathian Rus' Electoral district XXII 9 seats

Party	Bohemia		Moravia- Silesia		Slovakia		Subcarpathian Rus'	
Party	Votes	%	Votes	%	Votes	%	Votes	%
Republican Party of Farmers and Peasants	524,578	13.56	224,522	12.32	278,979	19.54	77,419	29.07
Czechoslovak Social Democratic Workers' Party	535,358	13.84	269,674	14.79	135,506	9.49	22,924	8.61
Czechoslovak National Socialist Party	535,740	13.85	177,595	9.74	43,968	3.08	10,025	3.76
Communist Party of Czechoslovakia	398,260	10.30	162,136	8.89	152,242	10.66	40,582	15.24
Czechoslovak People's Party	255,877	6.62	321,936	17.66	36,548	2.56	8,979	3.37
German Social Democratic Workers' Party	387,060	10.01	114,877	6.30	4,824	0.34	–	–
Hlinka's Slovak People's Party	962	0.02	20,406	1.12	403,683	28.27	–	–
German Electoral Coalition	288,972	7.47	90,560	4.97	13,704	0.96	3,218	1.21
Czechoslovak National Democracy	200,995	5.20	56,198	3.08	53,745	3.76	48,609	18.25
German Christian Social People's Party and German Commercial Party	221,945	5.74	126,121	6.92	–	–	–	
Czechoslovak Traders' Party	176,188	4.56	77,539	4.25	30,134	2.11	7,348	2.76
Provincial Christian Socialist, Hungarian National Party and Zipser German Party	–	–	–	–	226,917	15.89	30,455	11.44
German National Socialist Workers' Party	136,384	3.53	67,726	3.72	–	–	–	–
German National Party and Sudeten German Rural League	124,255	3.21	64,932	3.56	–	–	–	–
Electoral Union of Polish and Jewish Parties	13,699	0.35	40,410	2.22	33,679	2.36	16,768	6.30
League Against Bound Tickets	60,837	1.57	8,203	0.45	1,810	0.13	–	–
Provincial Party of Smallholders, Entrepreneurs and Workers	–	–	–	–	6,901	0.48	–	–
All German People's Party of Bohemia, Moravia and Silesia	6,672	0.17	–	–	–	–	–	–
Juriga's Slovak People's Party	–	–	–	–	5,395	0.38	–	–
Invalid votes	52,178	–	20,881	–	29,233	–	7,732	–
Total votes cast	3,919,960	100	1,843,716	100	1,457,268	100	274,059	100
Registered voters/turnout	4,251,922	92.19	1,999,578	92.21	1,621,329	89.88	310,633	88.23
Source: Manuel Statistique de la Republique Tchecoslovaque

==== By electoral district ====
===== Prague =====
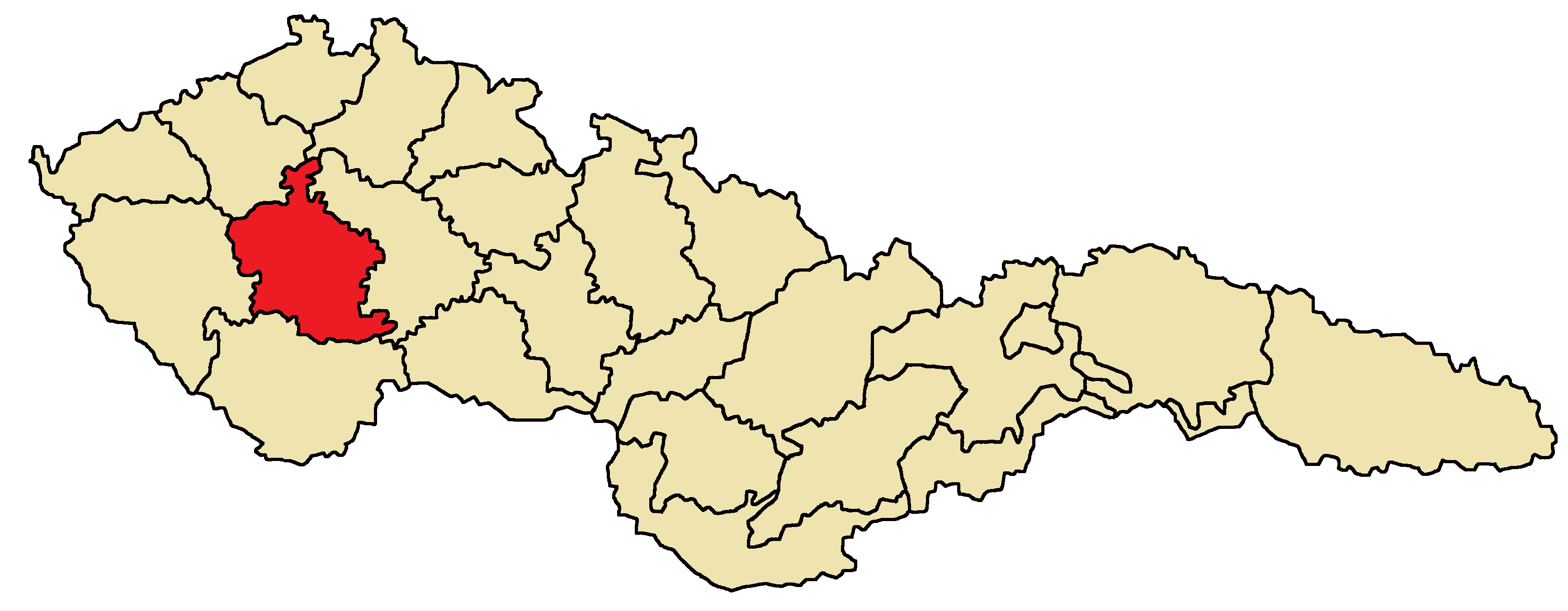
Prague - Section A Seats: 24

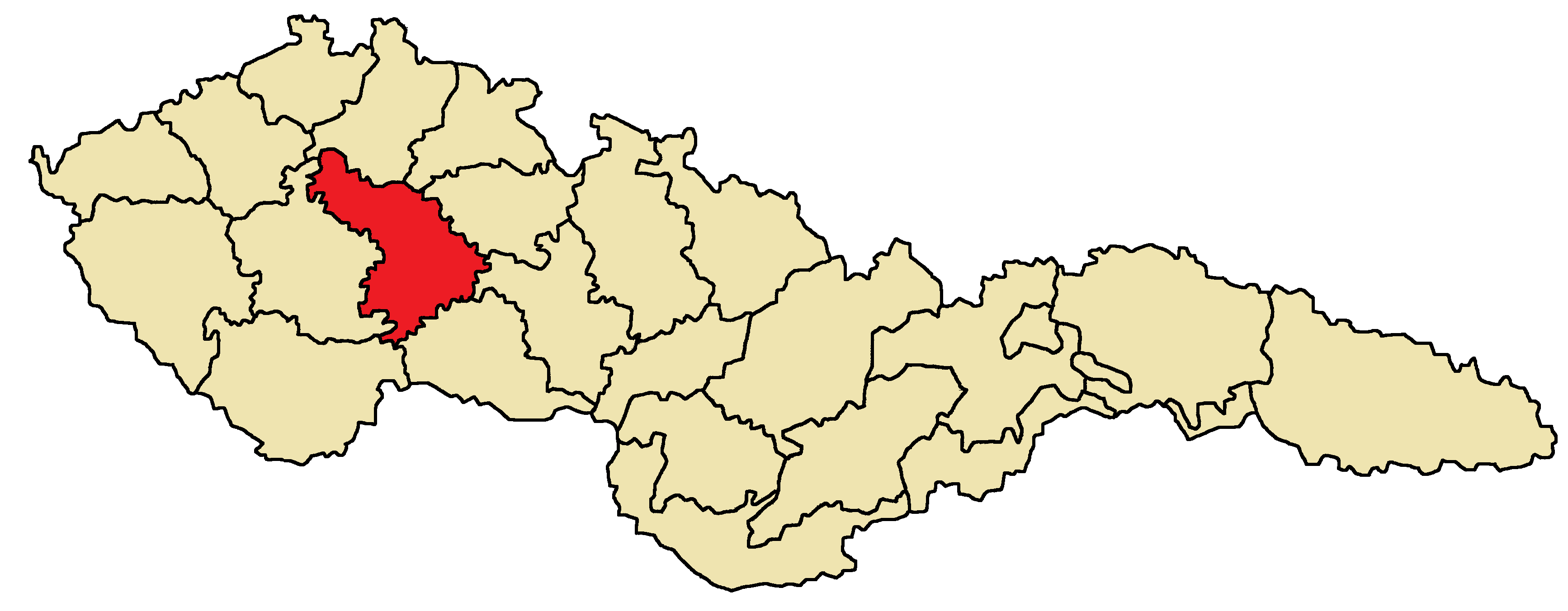
Prague - Section B Seats: 24

Party	I. Section A		I. Section B	
Party	Votes	%	Votes	%
Czechoslovak National Socialist Party	104,771	21.12	117,641	22.08
Republican Party of Farmers and Peasants	88,120	17.76	95,536	17.93
Czechoslovak Social Democratic Workers' Party	79,981	16.12	92,911	17.44
Communist Party of Czechoslovakia	58,905	11.87	57,998	10.89
Czechoslovak People's Party	45,715	9.21	52,262	9.81
Czechoslovak National Democracy	48,150	9.70	44,796	8.41
Czechoslovak Traders' Party	29,638	5.97	32,974	6.19
League Against Bound Tickets	23,125	4.66	23,067	4.33
German Electoral Coalition	7,971	1.61	7,558	1.42
United Jewish and Polish Parties	4,069	0.82	2,795	0.52
German Social Democratic Workers' Party	2,295	0.46	2,376	0.45
German Christian Social People's Party	1,702	0.34	1,432	0.27
German National Socialist Workers' Party	756	0.15	832	0.16
German National Party	968	0.20	578	0.11
Total valid votes	496,166	100	532,756	100
Source: Manuel Statistique

Nationality	IA (%)	IB (%)
Czechoslovak parties	84.55	86.19
Communists	11.87	10.89
German parties	2.76	2.40
Polish-Jewish parties	0.82	0.52
Source: Manuel Statistique

===== Hradec Králové =====
Josef Adámek (Czechoslovak People's Party) was elected from Pardubice electoral district.

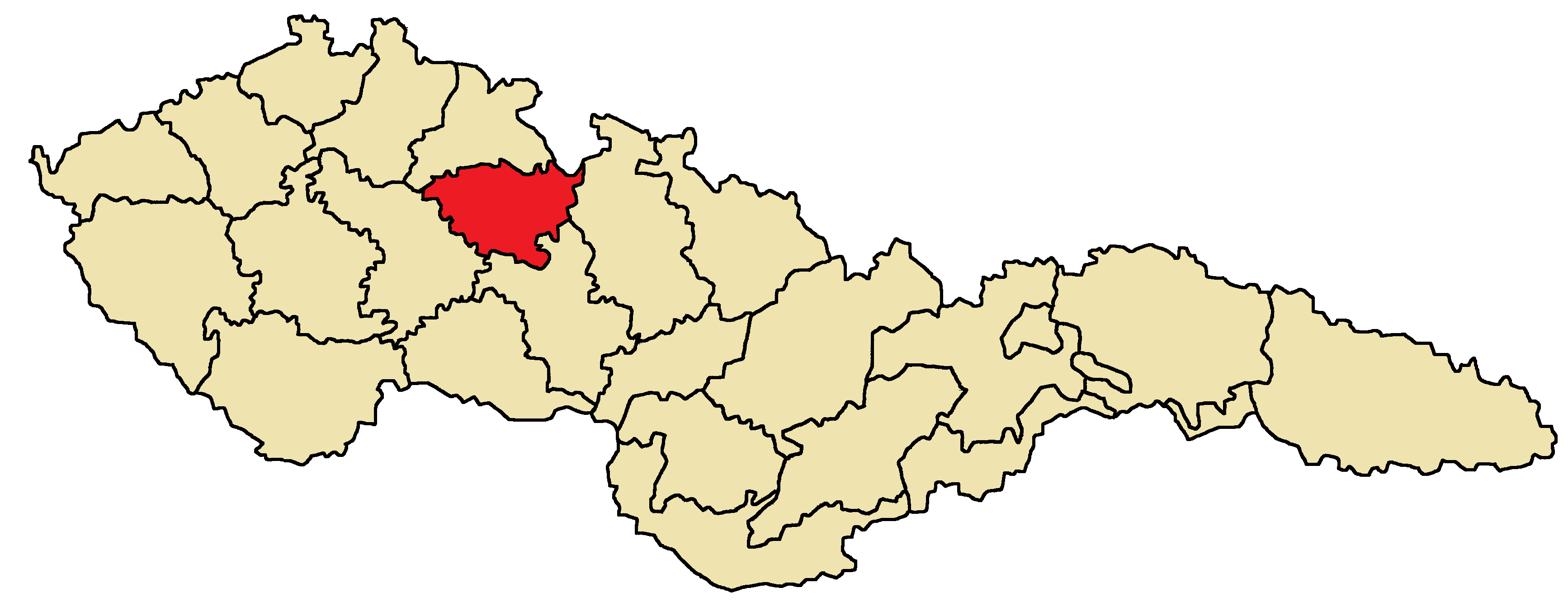
II. Pardubice Seats: 11

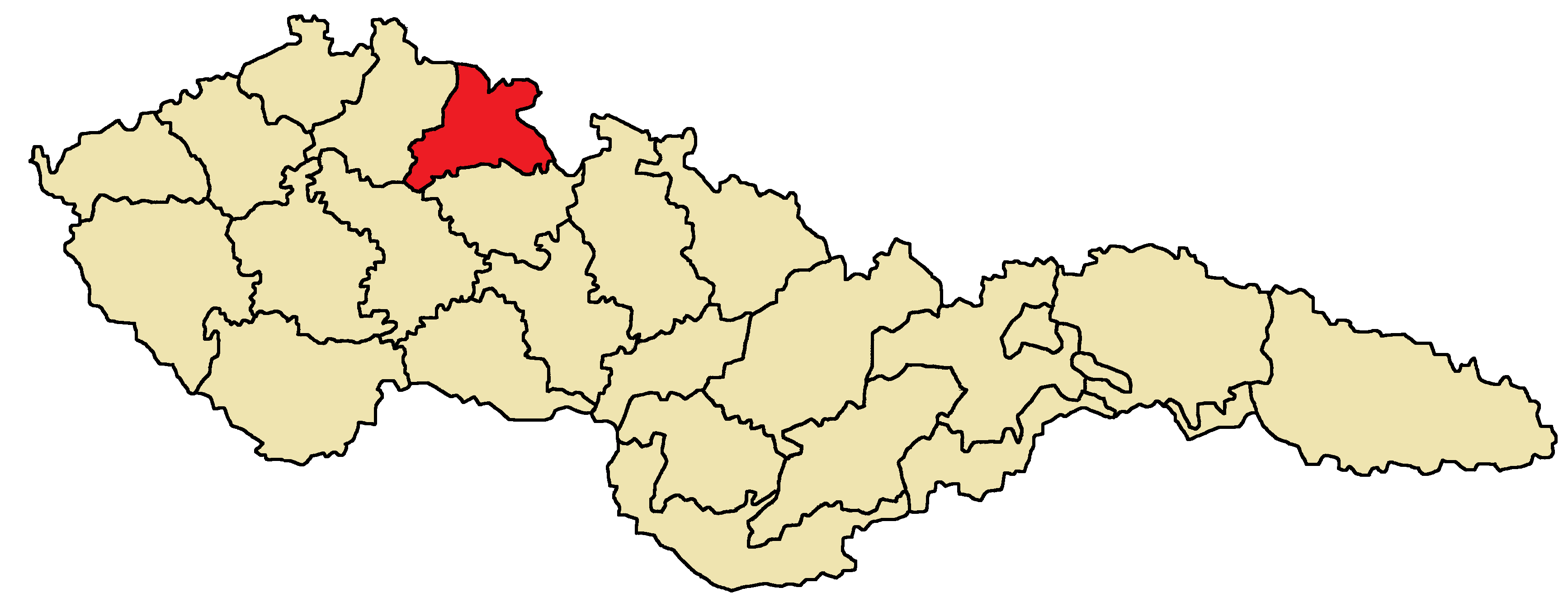
III. Hradec Králové Seats: 12

Party	II. Pardubice		III. Hradec Králové	
Party	Votes	%	Votes	%
Republican Party of Farmers and Peasants	57,654	21.56	49,146	16.50
Czechoslovak Social Democratic Workers' Party	49,863	18.65	38,990	13.09
Czechoslovak National Socialist Party	41,756	15.62	41,742	14.02
Czechoslovak People's Party	41,213	15.41	30,743	10.32
Czechoslovak Traders' Party	16,861	6.31	20,306	6.82
German Social Democratic Workers' Party	9,030	3.38	25,960	8.72
Communist Party of Czechoslovakia	15,955	5.97	18,600	6.25
German Electoral Coalition	12,368	4.63	20,221	6.79
German Christian Social People's Party	7,032	2.63	21,088	7.08
Czechoslovak National Democracy	10,186	3.81	15,594	5.24
German National Socialist Workers' Party	1,713	0.64	8,672	2.91
German National Party	1,083	0.41	4,513	1.52
League Against Bound Tickets	1,721	0.64	1,788	0.60
Hlinka's Slovak People's Party	962	0.36		
United Jewish and Polish Parties			470	0.16
Total valid votes	267,397	100	297,833	100
Source: Manuel Statistique

Nationality	II (%)	III (%)
Czechoslovak parties	82.36	66.58
German parties	11.68	27.01
Communists	5.97	6.25
Polish-Jewish parties	0.00	0.16
Source: Manuel Statistique

===== Mladá Boleslav =====
Amongst the deputies elected from the Česká Lípa 5th electoral district were Ernst Grünzner (DSAP), Irene Kirpal (DSAP), Josef Schweichhart (DSAP), Josef Kleibl (DNP) and Hans Krebs.

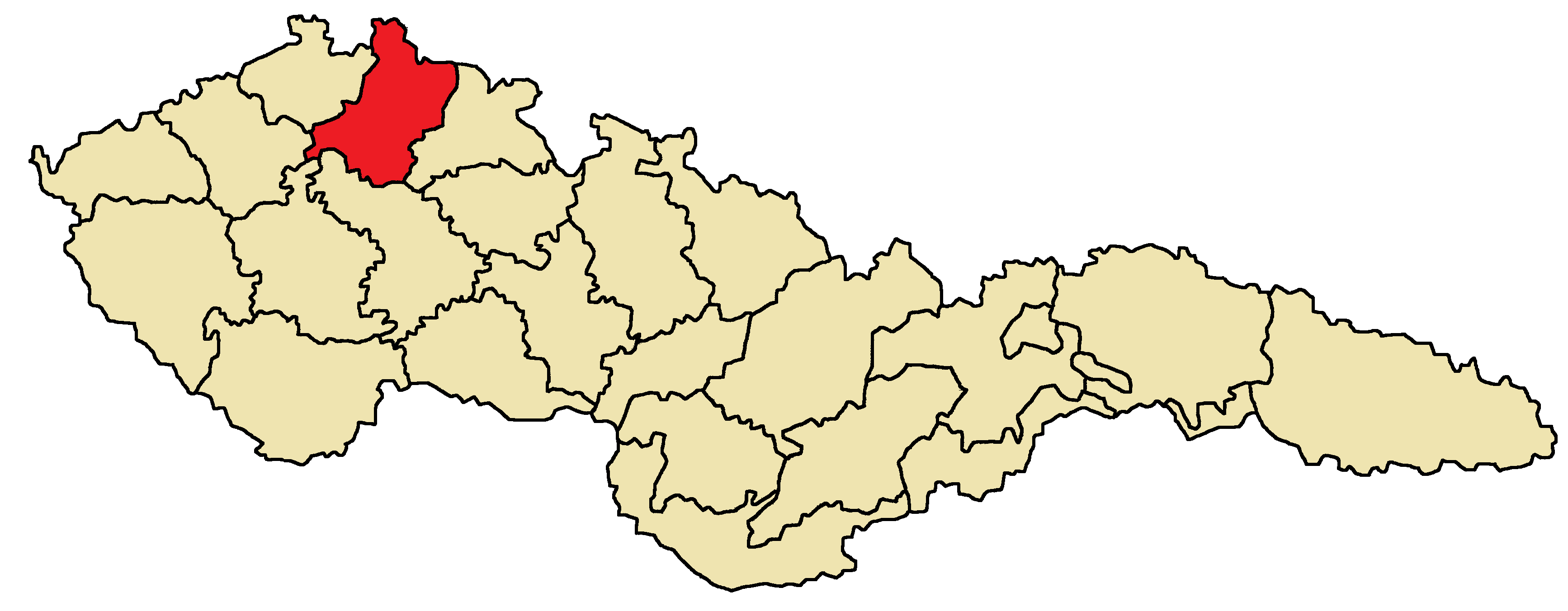
IV. Mladá Boleslav Seats: 17

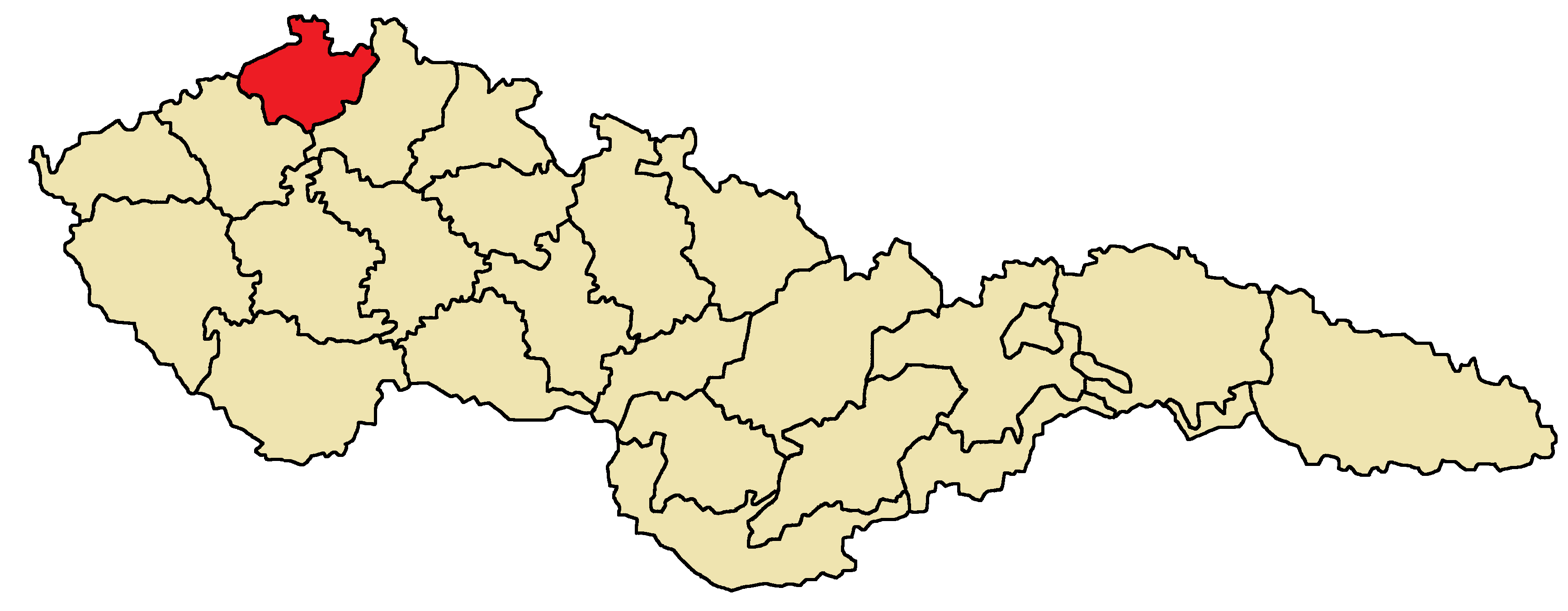
V. Česká Lípa Seats: 13

Party	IV. Mladá Boleslav		V. Česká Lípa	
Party	Votes	%	Votes	%
German Social Democratic Workers' Party	22,122	4.94	90,126	25.74
Communist Party of Czechoslovakia	57,406	12.82	42,019	12.00
German Electoral Coalition	26,786	5.98	67,778	19.35
Czechoslovak National Socialist Party	73,555	16.43	12,090	3.45
German Christian Social People's Party	27,358	6.11	50,558	14.44
Republican Party of Farmers and Peasants	71,696	16.02	2,656	0.76
German National Socialist Workers' Party	29,475	6.58	34,005	9.71
Czechoslovak Social Democratic Workers' Party	46,907	10.48	10,503	3.00
German National Party	15,567	3.48	33,065	9.44
Czechoslovak People's Party	27,269	6.09	1,433	0.41
Czechoslovak Traders' Party	25,280	5.65	1,643	0.47
Czechoslovak National Democracy	20,269	4.53	2,843	0.81
League Against Bound Tickets	3,540	0.79	628	0.18
United Jewish and Polish Parties	394	0.09	855	0.24
Total valid votes	447,624	100	350,202	100
Source: Manuel Statistique

Nationality	IV (%)	V (%)
German parties	27.10	78.68
Czechoslovak parties	59.99	9.08
Communists	12.82	12.00
Polish-Jewish parties	0.09	0.24
Source: Manuel Statistique

===== Louny =====
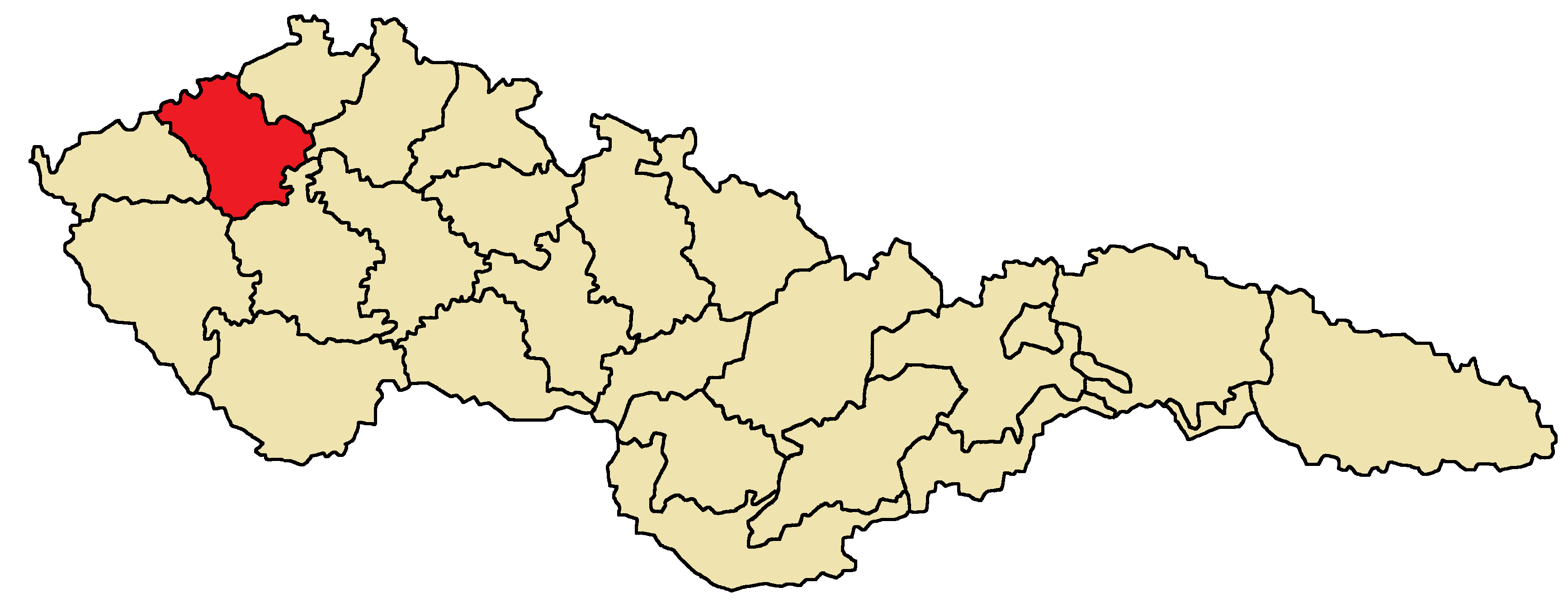
VI. Louny Seats: 17

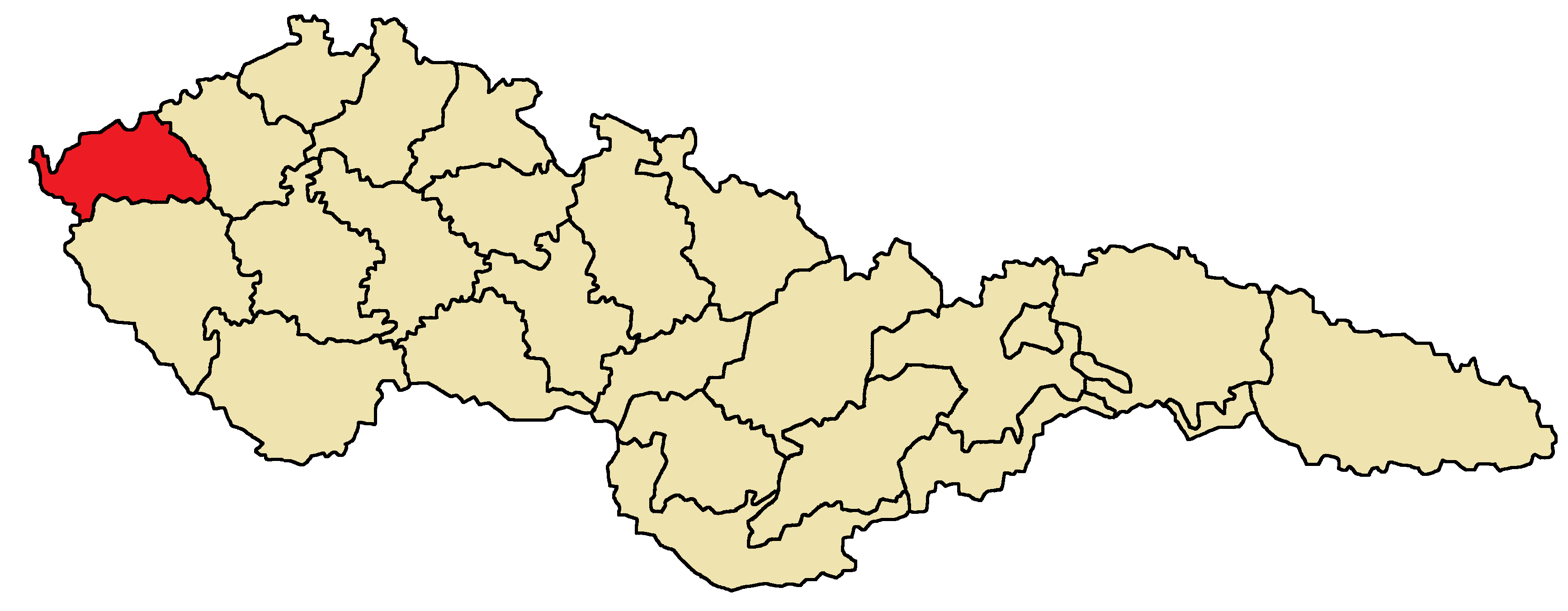
VII. Karlovy Vary Seats: 12

Party	VI. Louny		VII. Karlovy Vary	
Party	Votes	%	Votes	%
German Social Democratic Workers' Party	66,087	14.12	106,494	34.37
Communist Party of Czechoslovakia	74,487	15.91	37,298	12.04
German Electoral Coalition	31,297	6.69	49,085	15.84
Czechoslovak National Socialist Party	63,263	13.51	3,907	1.26
German Christian Social People's Party	25,048	5.35	40,698	13.13
Czechoslovak Social Democratic Workers' Party	60,823	12.99	2,974	0.96
German National Socialist Workers' Party	32,358	6.91	25,772	8.32
German National Party	19,426	4.15	31,764	10.25
Republican Party of Farmers and Peasants	38,579	8.24	1,882	0.61
Czechoslovak National Democracy	23,665	5.06	1,531	0.49
Czechoslovak Traders' Party	18,128	3.87	664	0.21
Czechoslovak People's Party	10,228	2.18	372	0.12
Pangerman Party of Bohemia, Moravia and Silesia			6,672	2.15
United Jewish and Polish Parties	2,697	0.58	773	0.25
League Against Bound Tickets	2,054	0.44		
Total valid votes	468,140	100	309,886	100
Source: Manuel Statistique

Nationality	VI (%)	VII (%)
German parties	37.21	84.06
Czechoslovak parties	46.30	3.66
Communists	15.91	12.04
Polish-Jewish parties	0.58	0.25
Source: Manuel Statistique

===== Plzeň =====
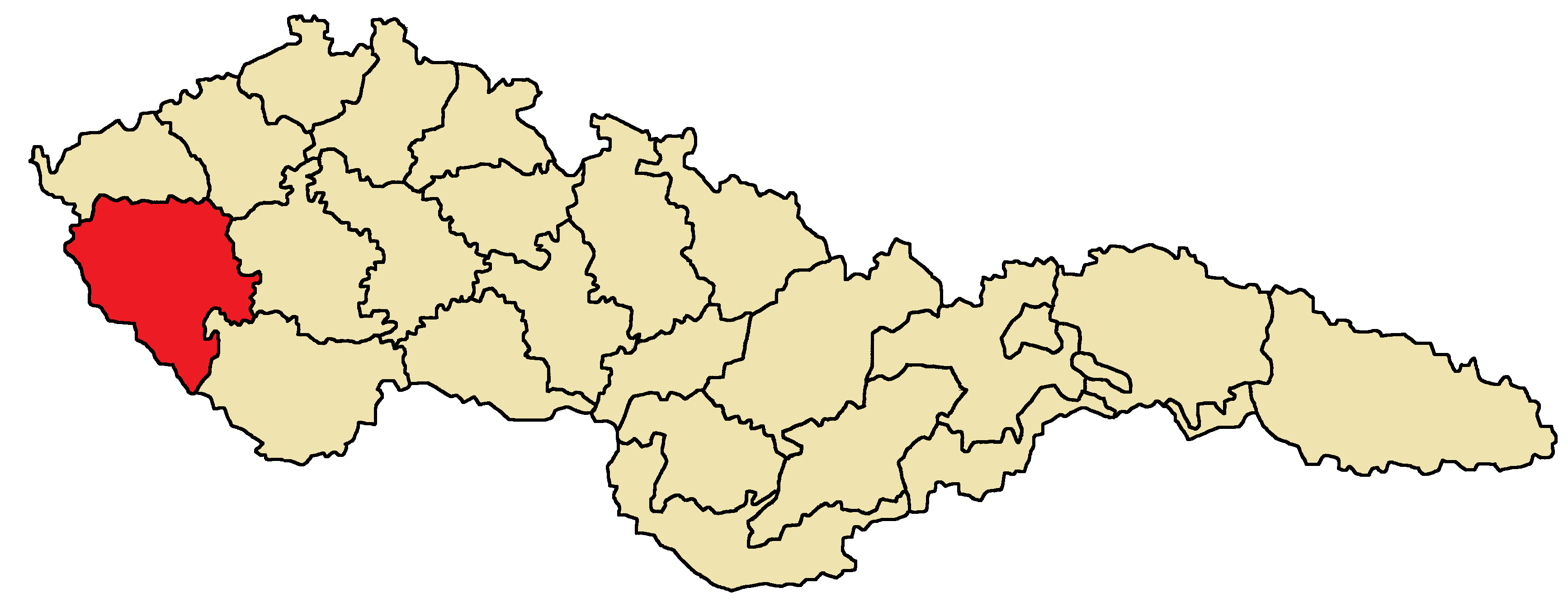
VIII. Plzeň Seats: 17

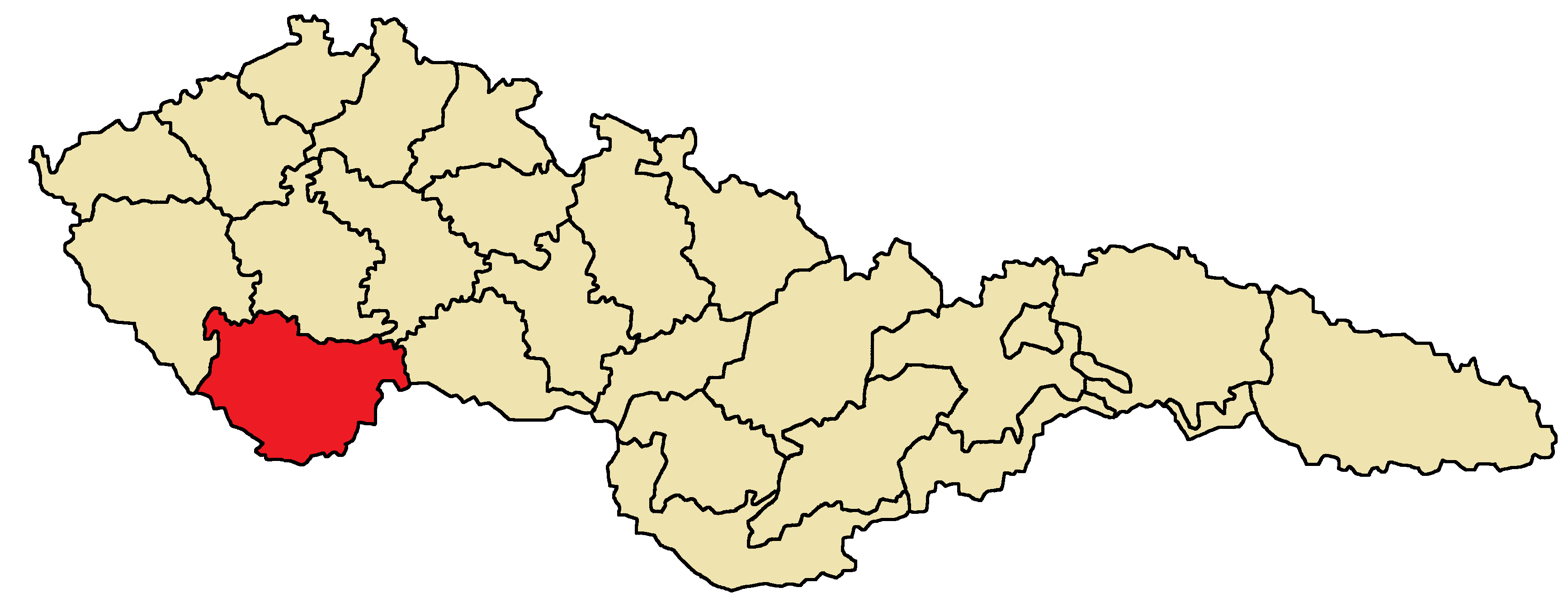
IX. České Budějovice Seats: 13

Party	VIII. Plzeň		IX. České Budějovice	
Party	Votes	%	Votes	%
Czechoslovak Social Democratic Workers' Party	115,320	28.15	37,086	12.87
Republican Party of Farmers and Peasants	55,975	13.66	63,334	21.98
Czechoslovak National Socialist Party	42,956	10.49	34,059	11.82
German Electoral Coalition	43,260	10.56	22,648	7.86
German Social Democratic Workers' Party	41,986	10.25	20,584	7.14
German Christian Social People's Party	23,341	5.70	23,688	8.22
Czechoslovak People's Party	17,404	4.25	29,238	10.15
Communist Party of Czechoslovakia	17,902	4.37	17,690	6.14
Czechoslovak National Democracy	20,483	5.00	13,478	4.68
Czechoslovak Traders' Party	15,753	3.85	14,941	5.19
German National Party	11,189	2.73	6,102	2.12
League Against Bound Tickets	2,472	0.60	2,442	0.85
German National Socialist Workers' Party			2,801	0.97
United Jewish and Polish Parties	1,646	0.40		
Total valid votes	409,687	100	288,091	100
Source: Manuel Statistique

Nationality	VI (%)	VII (%)
Czechoslovak parties	65.99	67.54
German parties	29.24	26.32
Communists	4.37	6.14
Polish-Jewish parties	0.40	0.00
Source: Manuel Statistique

===== Brno =====
Amongst the deputies elected from the Jihlava 10th electoral district were Johann Wagner (German Electoral Coalition), Erwin Zajicek (German Christian Social People's Party) and Viktor Stern (Communist Party).

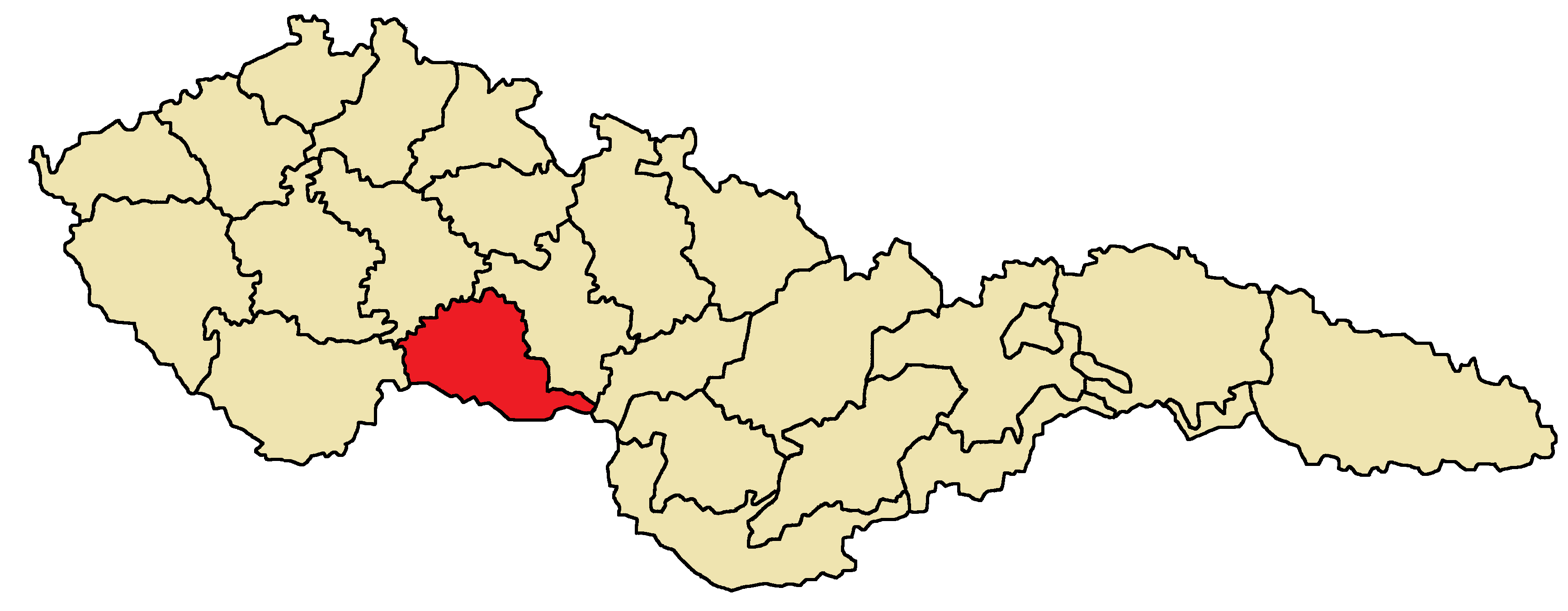
X. Jihlava Seats: 9

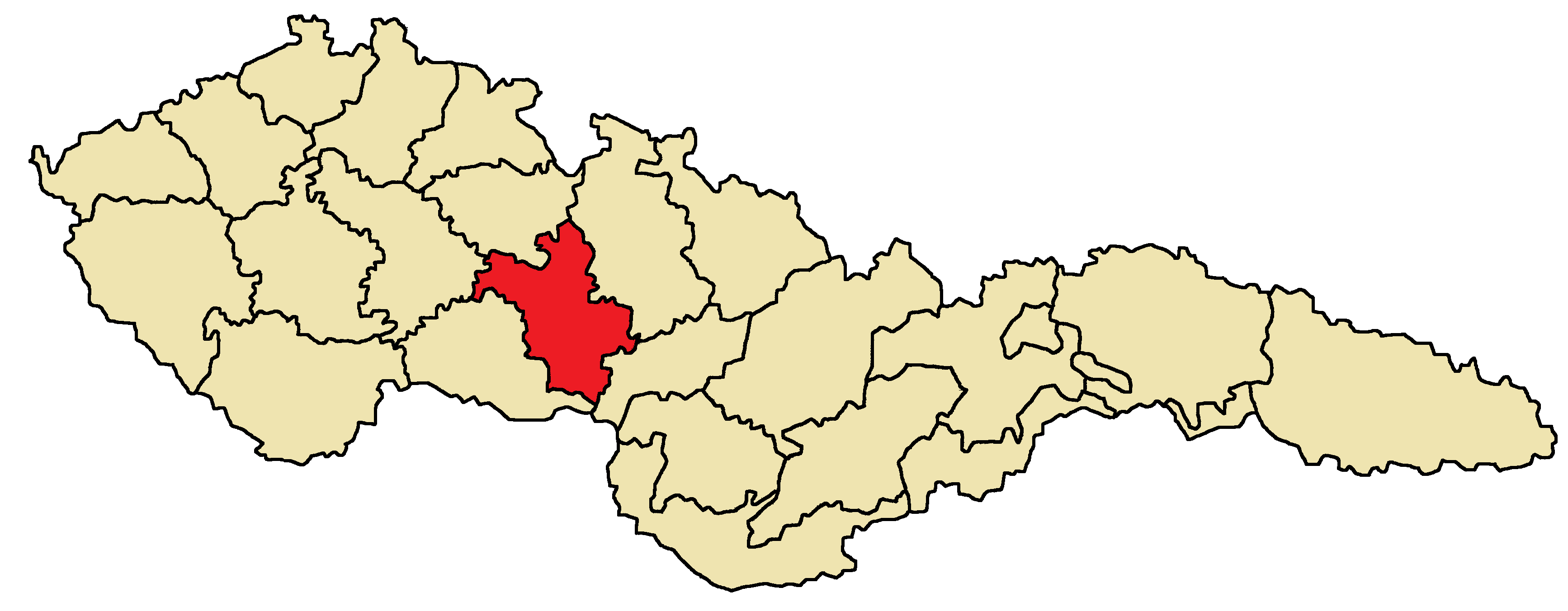
XI. Brno Seats: 17

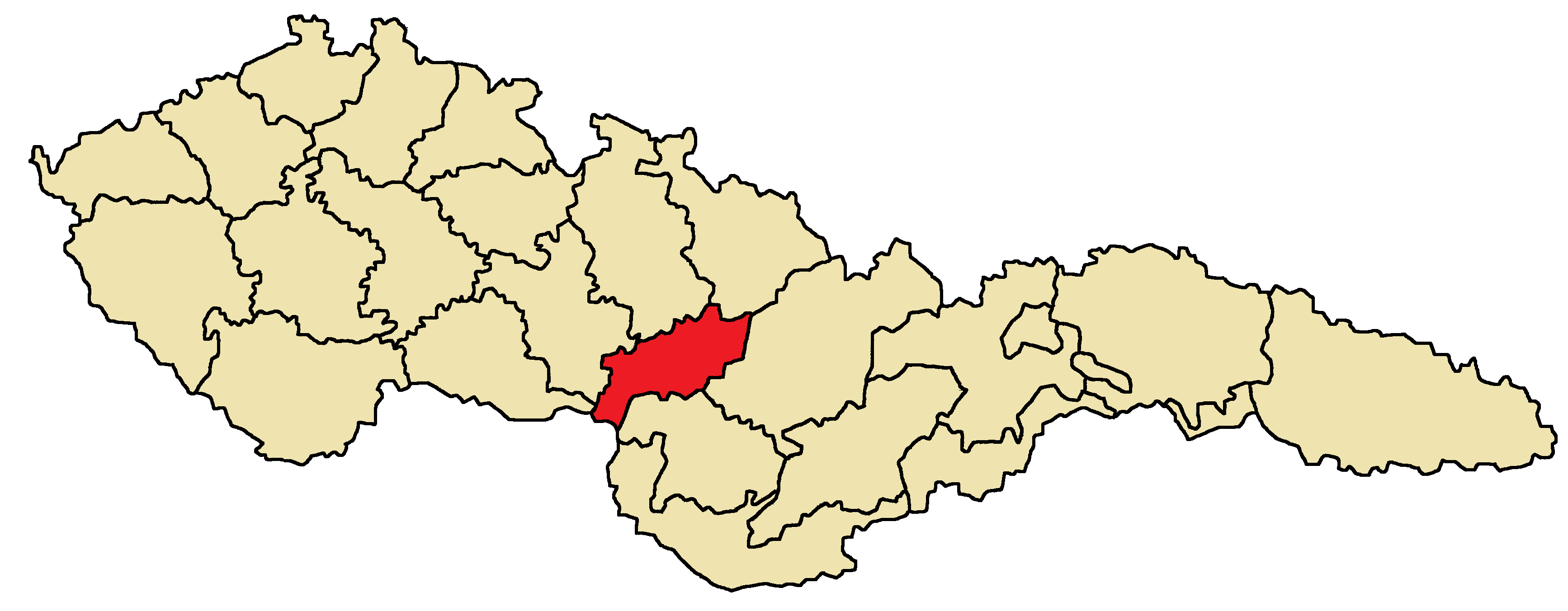
XIII. Uherské Hradiště Seats: 8

Party	X. Jihlava		XI. Brno		XIII. Uherské Hradiště	
Party	Votes	%	Votes	%	Votes	%
Czechoslovak People's Party	42,324	18.28	83,016	19.19	68,241	34.02
Republican Party of Farmers and Peasants	44,401	19.17	56,474	13.05	35,437	17.67
Czechoslovak Social Democratic Workers' Party	25,787	11.14	56,597	13.08	27,190	13.55
Czechoslovak National Socialist Party	18,129	7.83	70,000	16.18	18,504	9.22
Communist Party of Czechoslovakia	16,010	6.91	42,555	9.84	22,742	11.34
German Christian Social People's Party	25,078	10.83	19,329	4.47	462	0.23
Czechoslovak Traders' Party	11,027	4.76	19,553	4.52	11,950	5.96
German Electoral Coalition	19,232	8.31	18,328	4.24	991	0.49
German Social Democratic Workers' Party	9,911	4.28	24,840	5.74	823	0.41
German National Party	11,177	4.83	10,368	2.40		
Czechoslovak National Democracy	3,137	1.35	10,734	2.48	6,293	3.14
Hlinka's Slovak People's Party			7,080	1.64	4,655	2.32
German National Socialist Workers' Party	3,774	1.63	7,748	1.79		
United Jewish and Polish Parties	1,570	0.68	3,359	0.78	2,259	1.13
League Against Bound Tickets			2,672	0.62	1,049	0.52
Total valid votes	231,557	100	432,653	100	200,596	100
Source: Manuel Statistique

Nationality	X (%)	XI (%)	XIII (%)
Czechoslovak parties	62.54	70.76	86.40
German parties	29.87	18.63	1.13
Communists	6.91	9.84	11.34
Polish-Jewish parties	0.68	0.78	1.13
Source: Manuel Statistique

===== Moravská Ostrava =====
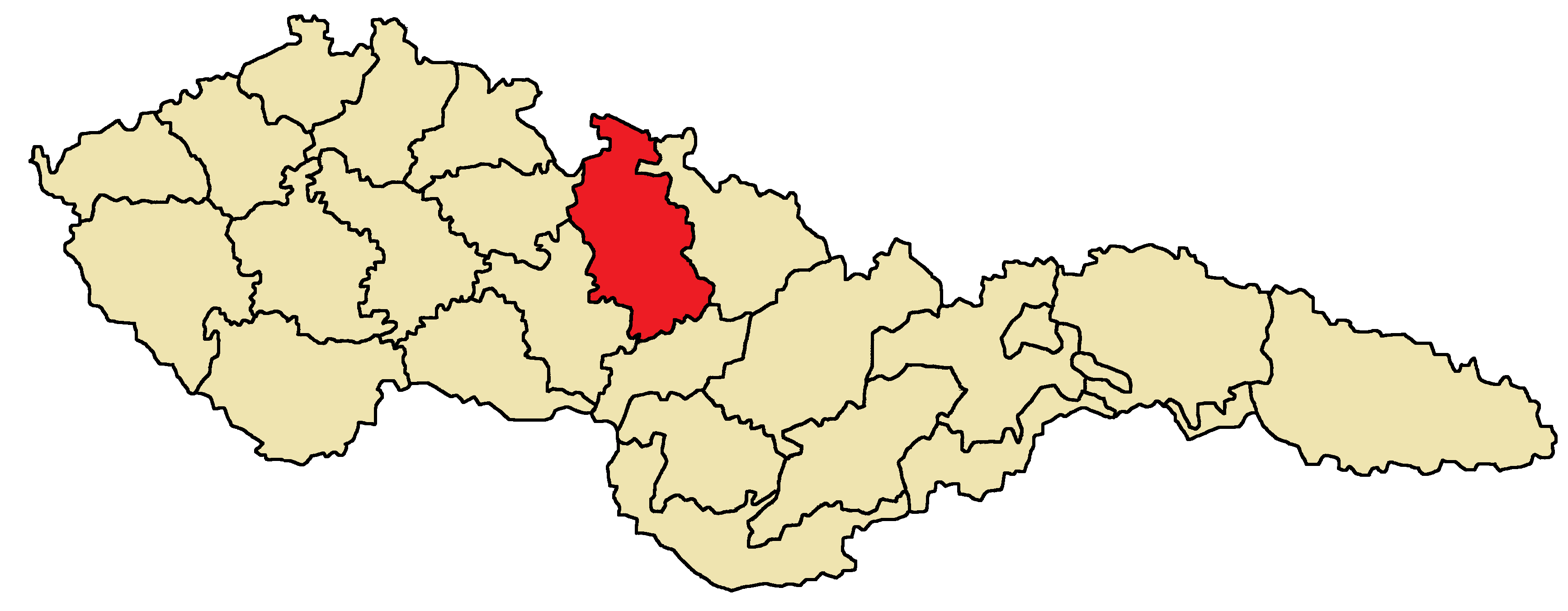
XII. Olomouc Seats: 17

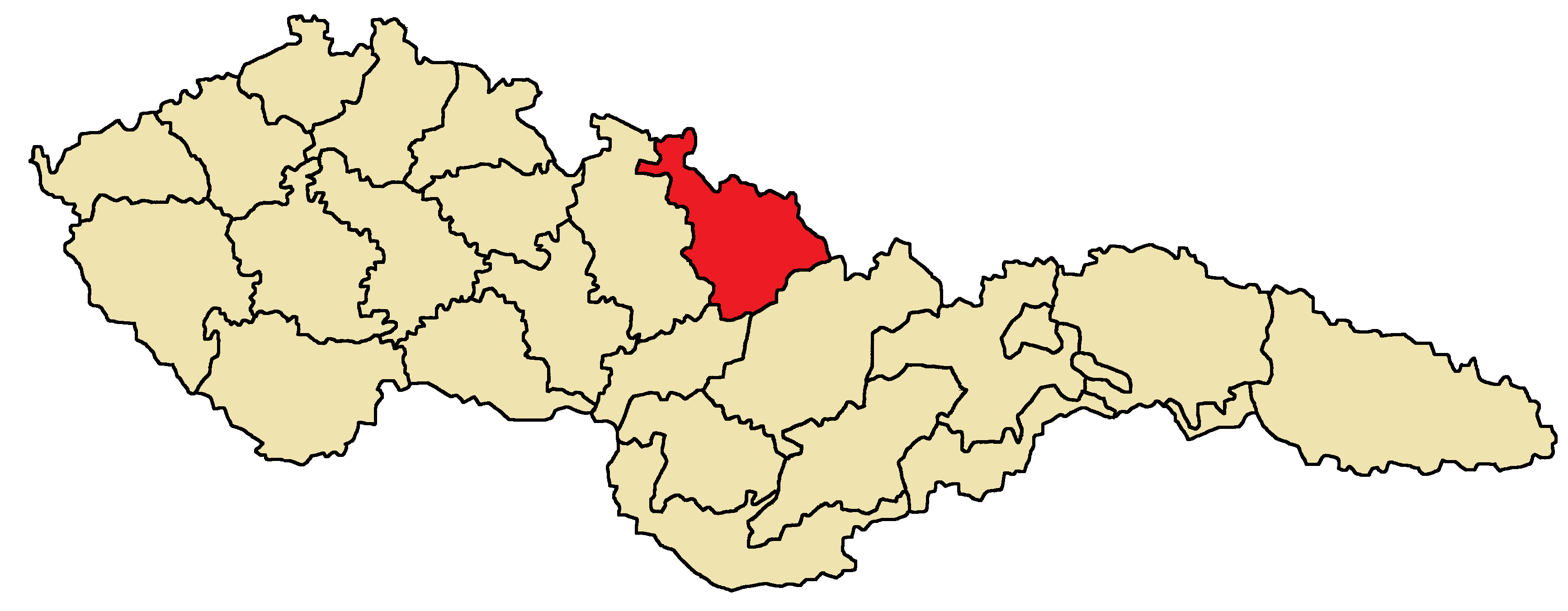
XIV. Moravská Ostrava Seats: 19

Party	XII. Olomouc		XIV. Moravská Ostrava	
Party	Votes	%	Votes	%
Czechoslovak Social Democratic Workers' Party	64,314	14.55	95,786	18.56
Czechoslovak People's Party	68,361	15.47	59,994	11.62
Republican Party of Farmers and Peasants	53,088	12.01	35,122	6.80
German Christian Social People's Party	45,608	10.32	35,644	6.91
Communist Party of Czechoslovakia	28,611	6.47	52,218	10.12
German Social Democratic Workers' Party	42,319	9.58	36,984	7.17
Czechoslovak National Socialist Party	28,687	6.49	42,275	8.19
German National Socialist Workers Party	22,883	5.18	33,321	6.46
German Electoral Coalition	32,744	7.41	19,265	3.73
German National Party	15,545	3.52	27,842	5.39
Czechoslovak National Democracy	12,770	2.89	23,264	4.51
Czechoslovak Traders' Party	20,170	4.56	14,839	2.87
United Jewish and Polish Parties	2,512	0.57	30,710	5.95
Hlinka's Slovak People's Party	2,032	0.46	6,639	1.29
League Against Bound Tickets	2,234	0.51	2,248	0.44
Total valid votes	441,878	100	516,151	100
Source: Manuel Statistique

Nationality	XII (%)	XIV (%)
Czechoslovak parties	56.95	54.28
German parties	36.01	29.65
Communists	6.47	10.12
Polish-Jewish parties	0.57	5.95
Source: Manuel Statistique

===== Turčiansky Svätý Martin =====
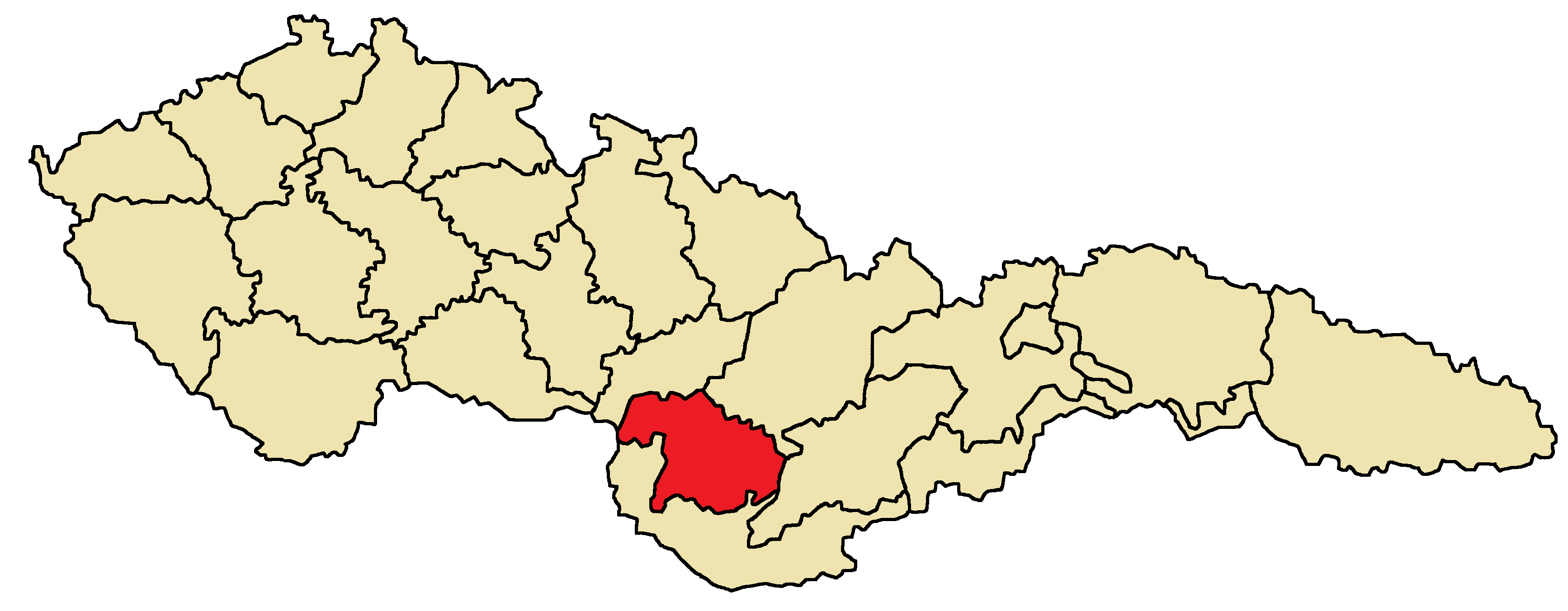
XV. Trnava Seats: 9

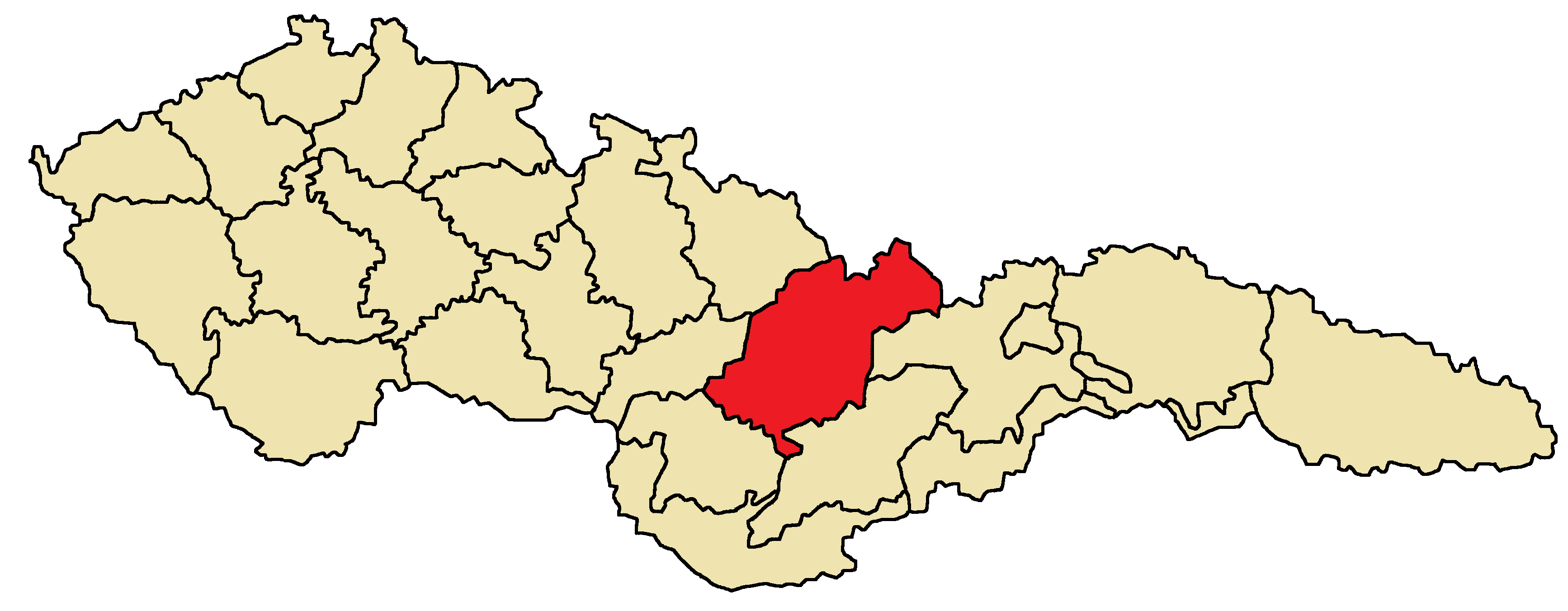
XVII. Turčiansky Svätý Martin Seats: 11

Party	XV. Trnava		XVII. Turčiansky Svätý Martin	
Party	Votes	%	Votes	%
Hlinka's Slovak People's Party	82,267	37.93	114,883	48.89
Republican Party of Farmers and Peasants	45,291	20.88	36,352	15.47
Czechoslovak Social Democratic Workers' Party	26,281	12.12	23,249	9.89
Communist Party of Czechoslovakia	24,471	11.28	14,520	6.18
Czechoslovak People's Party	4,081	1.88	20,028	8.52
Czechoslovak National Socialist Party	6,967	3.21	5,050	2.15
Czechoslovak Traders' Party	7,032	3.24	3,919	1.67
United Jewish and Polish Parties	5,198	2.40	5,201	2.21
Czechoslovak National Democracy	4,457	2.05	5,386	2.29
Provincial Christian-Socialist Party	5,957	2.75	3,779	1.61
German Electoral Coalition	2,156	0.99	2,196	0.93
Juriga's Slovak People's Party	2,752	1.27		
League Against Bound Tickets			399	0.17
Total valid votes	216,910	100	234,962	100
Source: Manuel Statistique

Nationality	XV (%)	XVII (%)
Czechoslovak parties	82.58	89.06
Communists	11.28	6.18
Polish-Jewish parties	2.40	2.21
Magyar-German parties	2.75	1.61
German parties	0.99	0.93
Source: Manuel Statistique

===== Liptovský Svätý Mikuláš =====
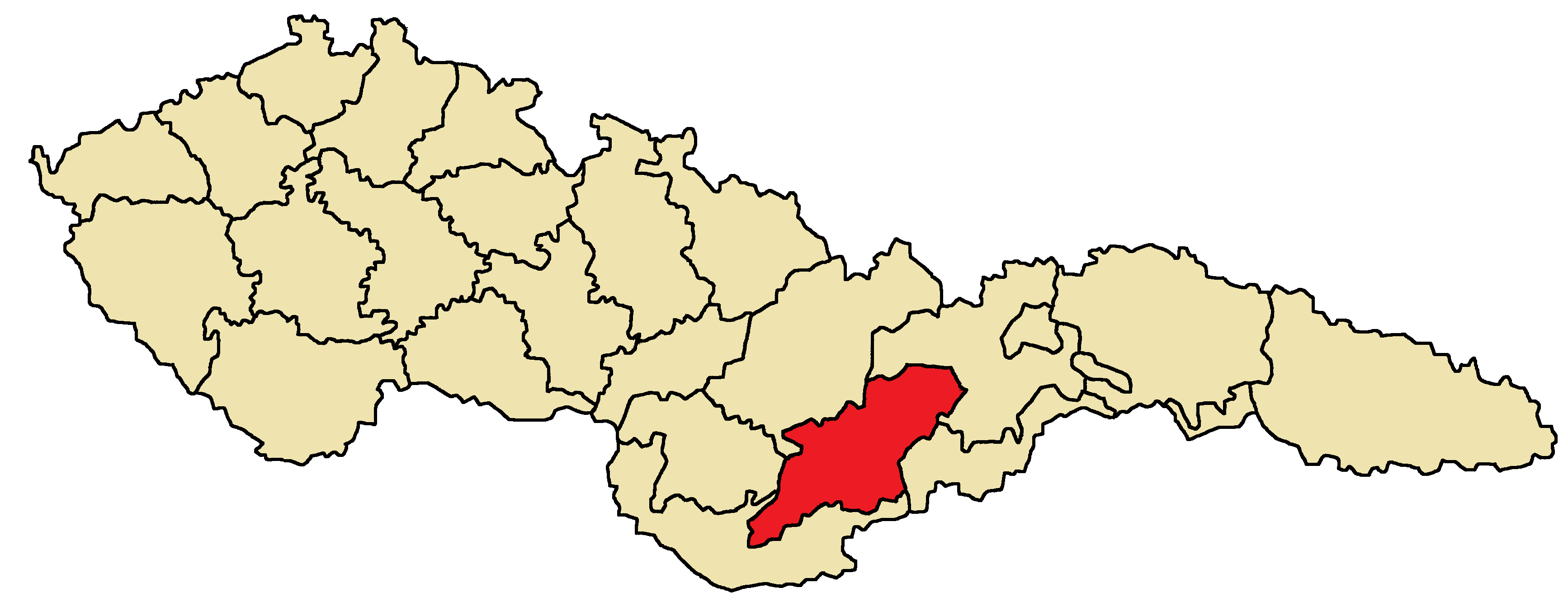
XVIII. Banská Bystrica Seats: 7

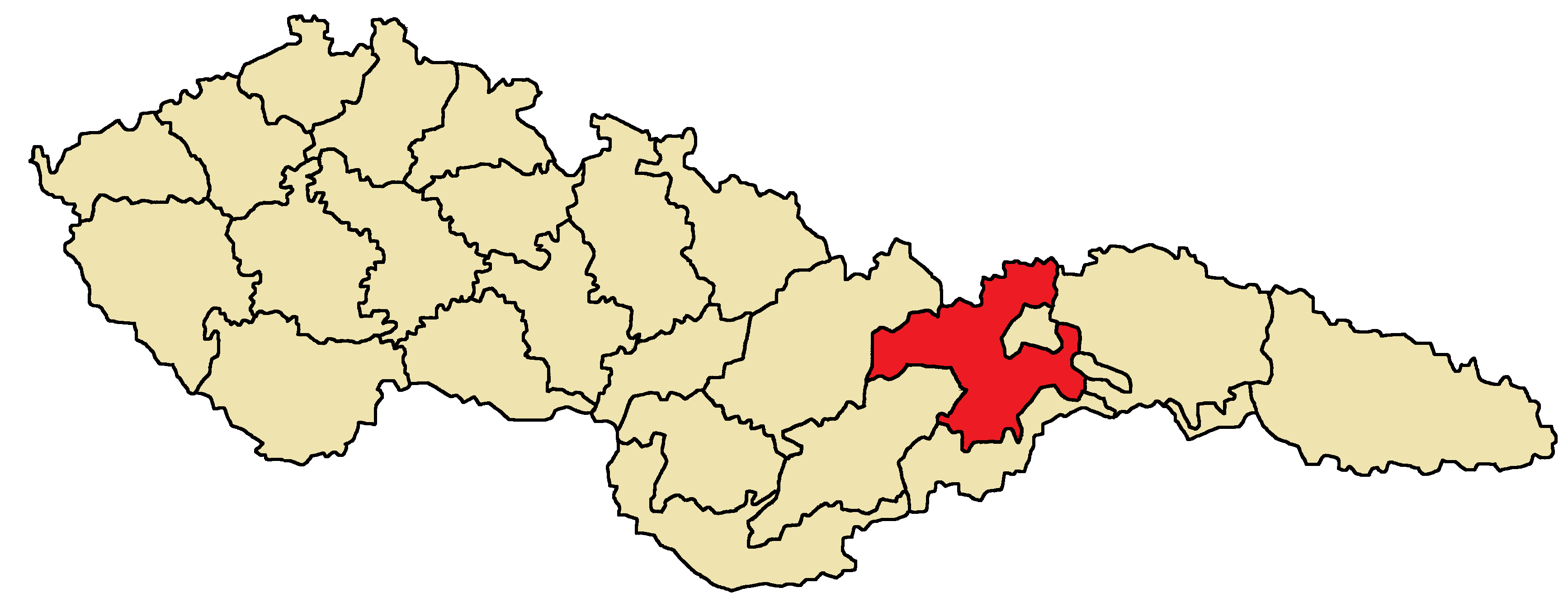
XIX. Liptovský Svätý Mikuláš Seats: 6

Party	XVIII. Banská Bystrica		XIX. Liptovský Svätý Mikuláš	
Party	Votes	%	Votes	%
Hlinka's Slovak People's Party	62,143	39.05	39,888	34.20
Republican Party of Farmers and Peasants	31,830	20.00	31,730	27.20
Czechoslovak Social Democratic Workers' Party	22,438	14.10	13,352	11.45
Communist Party of Czechoslovakia	12,088	7.60	9,166	7.86
Czechoslovak National Democracy	7,597	4.77	9,976	8.55
Provincial Christian-Socialist Party	8,968	5.63	4,291	3.68
Czechoslovak National Socialist Party	4,688	2.95	3,015	2.58
Czechoslovak Traders' Party	2,587	1.63	1,668	1.43
United Jewish and Polish Parties	1,773	1.11	1,435	1.23
German Electoral Coalition	2,732	1.72	407	0.35
Czechoslovak People's Party	1,614	1.01	1,496	1.28
Juriga's Slovak People's Party	691	0.43		
League Against Bound Tickets			220	0.19
Total valid votes	159,149	100	116,644	100
Source: Manuel Statistique

Nationality	XV (%)	XVII (%)
Czechoslovak parties	83.94	86.88
Communists	7.60	7.86
Magyar-German parties	5.63	3.68
Polish-Jewish parties	1.11	1.23
German parties	1.72	0.35
Source: Manuel Statistique

===== Prešov =====
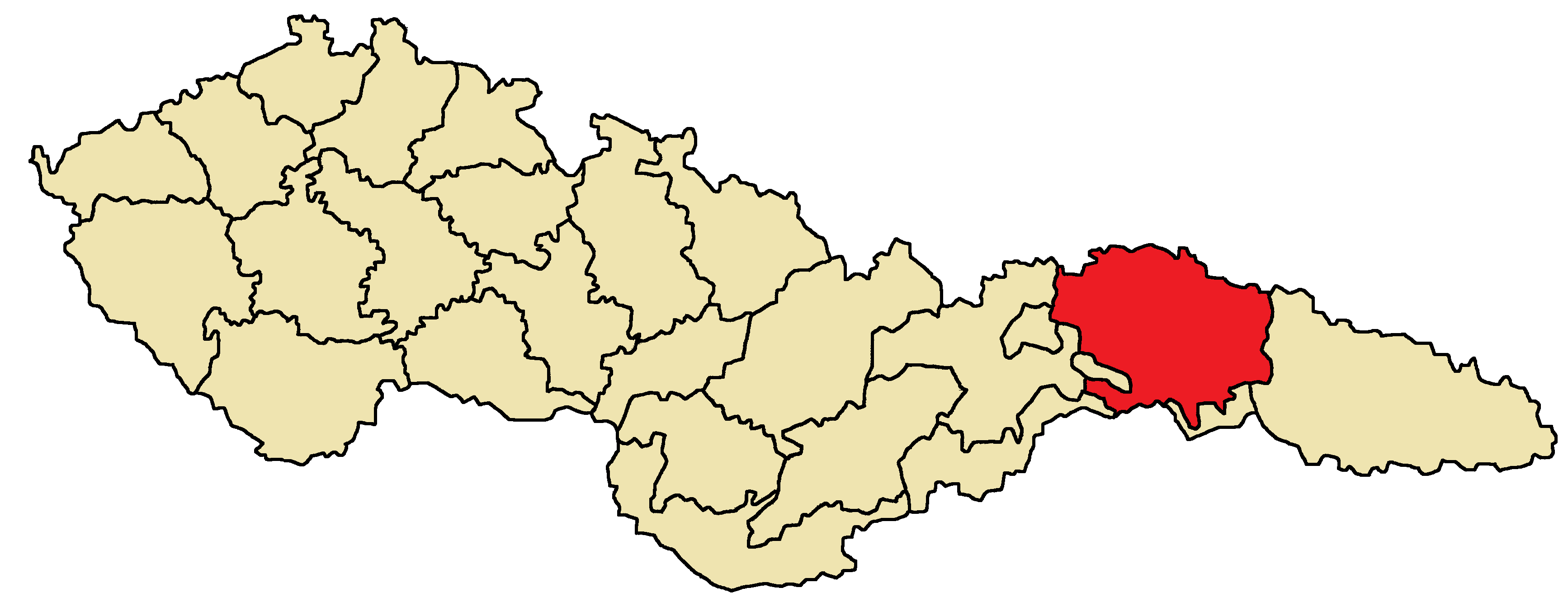
XXI. Prešov Seats: 5

Party	XXI. Prešov	
Party	Votes	%
Republican Party of Farmers and Peasants	70,224	36.56
Hlinka's Slovak People's Party	55,651	28.98
Czechoslovak National Democracy	17,415	9.07
Provincial Christian-Socialist Party	13,461	7.01
Communist Party of Czechoslovakia	8,777	4.57
United Jewish and Polish Parties	7,601	3.96
Czechoslovak Social Democratic Workers' Party	6,301	3.28
Czechoslovak People's Party	5,663	2.95
Czechoslovak National Socialist Party	4,641	2.42
Czechoslovak Traders' Party	2,322	1.21
Total valid votes	192,056	100
Source: Manuel Statistique

Nationality	XXI (%)
Czechoslovak parties	84.46
Magyar-German parties	7.01
Communists	4.57
Polish-Jewish parties	3.96
Source: Manuel Statistique

===== Nové Zámky =====
The Nové Zámky senatorial district consisted of the Nové Zámky 16th electoral district and the Košice 20th electoral district, two districts that together hosted around 96% of the Hungarian and 56% of the German population of Slovakia. The percentage achieved by the Communist Party in the Nové Zámky 16th electoral district was the highest in the country in the 1929 vote.

Hlinka's Slovak People's Party fielded Vojtech Tuka in the Košice 20th electoral district, but he failed to win a seat. Fielding Tuka in a district where the party lacked strong support displayed the ambiguity the party had towards him during his treason trials.

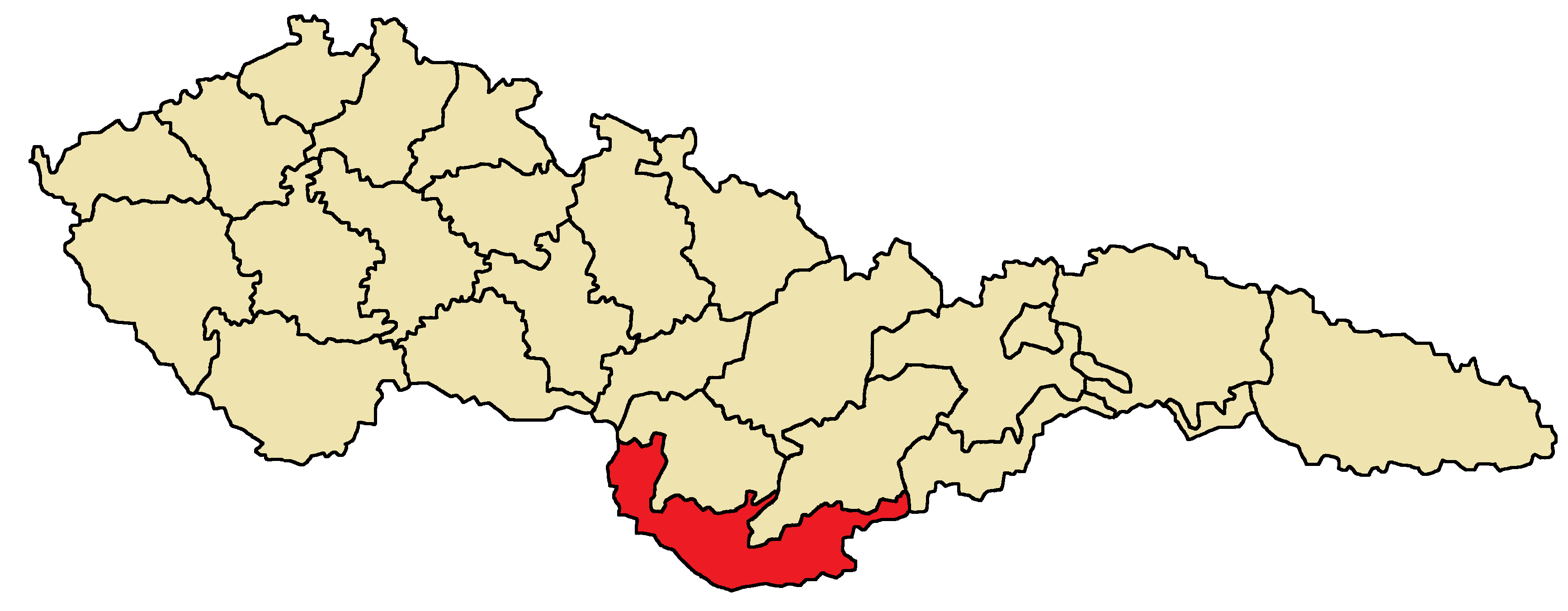
XVI. Nové Zámky Seats: 11

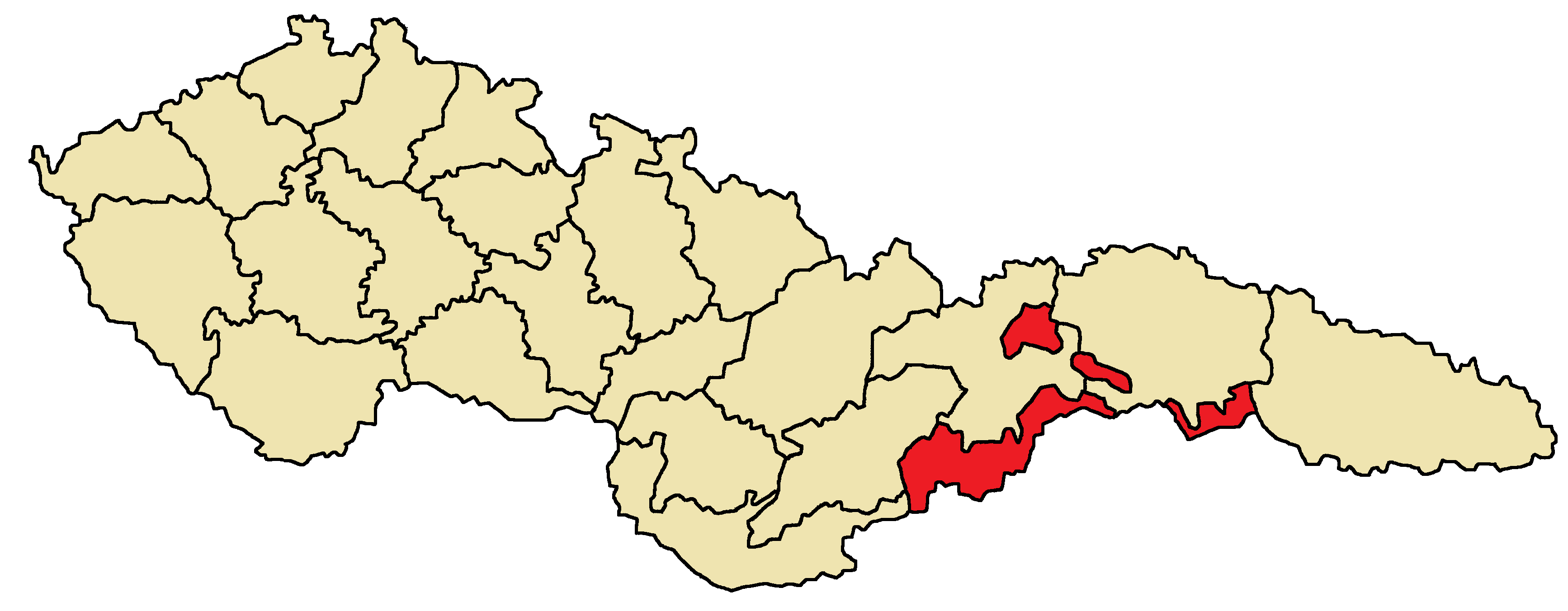
XX. Košice Seats: 7

Party	XVI. Nové Zámky		XX. Košice	
Party	Votes	%	Votes	%
Provincial Christian-Socialist Party	119,987	37.64	70,474	37.19
Communist Party of Czechoslovakia	53,702	16.84	29,518	15.58
Republican Party of Farmers and Peasants	33,687	10.57	29,865	15.76
Hlinka's Slovak People's Party	29,475	9.25	19,376	10.22
Czechoslovak Social Democratic Workers' Party	31,093	9.75	12,792	6.75
Czechoslovak National Socialist Party	12,140	3.81	7,467	3.94
Czechoslovak Traders' Party	8,569	2.69	4,037	2.13
United Jewish and Polish Parties	7,480	2.35	4,991	2.63
Czechoslovak National Democracy	4,002	1.26	4,912	2.59
Provincial Party of Smallholders, Entrepreneurs and Workers of Czechoslovakia	5,733	1.80	1,168	0.62
German Electoral Coalition	4,268	1.34	1,945	1.03
German Social Democratic Workers' Party	3,813	1.20	1,011	0.53
Czechoslovak People's Party	2,065	0.65	1,601	0.84
Juriga's Slovak People's Party	1,952	0.61		
League Against Bound Tickets	843	0.26	348	0.18
Total valid votes	318,809	100	189,505	100
Source: Manuel Statistique

Nationality	XVI (%)	XX (%)
Czechoslovak parties	38.84	42.43
Magyar-German parties	37.64	37.19
Communists	16.84	15.58
Polish-Jewish parties	2.35	2.63
German parties	2.53	1.56
Magyar parties	1.80	0.62
Source: Manuel Statistique

===== Užhorod =====
A bloc aligned with the Agrarians merged as the most voted list in the Užhorod electoral district, the sole electoral district in Subcarpathian Rus'. The bloc formed by the National Democrats and the Russian National Bloc, which included the Autonomous Agrarian Union, the Russian National Party, the Russian National Union and the Carpatho-Russian Labour Party of Small Peasants and Landless, finished in second place.

The Czechoslovak Social Democratic Workers' Party stood on a joint list with the Social Democratic Workers' Party in Subcarpathian Rus' in the constituency. The sole mandate won by this list went to Julius Husnaj of the Czechoslovak Social Democratic Workers' Party.

The Czechoslovak People's Party contested under the name 'Christian People's Party' in the Užhorod electoral district.

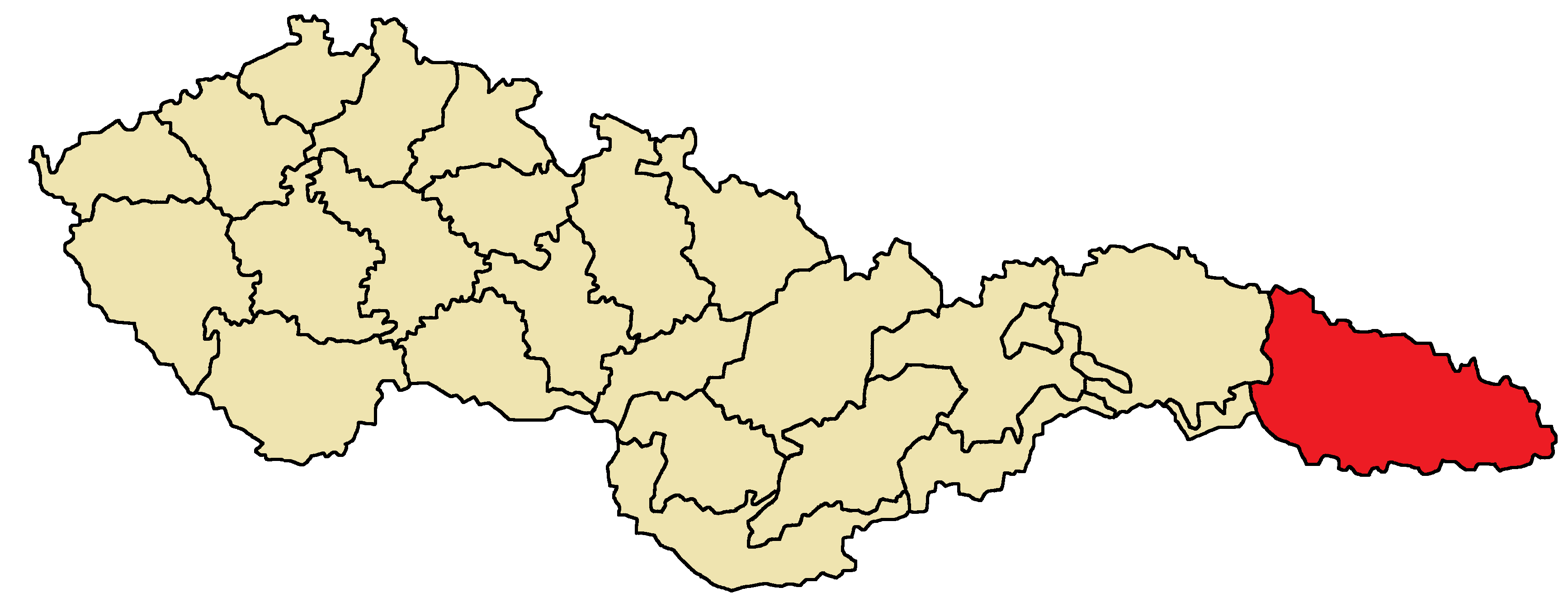
XXII. Užhorod Seats: 9

Party	XXII. Užhorod	
Party	Votes	%
Republican Party of Farmers and Peasants	77,419	29.07
Czechoslovak National Democracy	48,609	18.25
Communist Party of Czechoslovakia	40,582	15.24
Provincial Christian-Socialist Party	30,455	11.44
Czechoslovak Social Democratic Workers' Party	22,924	8.61
United Jewish and Polish Parties	16,768	6.30
Czechoslovak National Socialist Party	10,025	3.76
Christian People's Party (ČSL)	8,979	3.37
Czechoslovak Traders' Party	7,348	2.76
German Electoral Coalition	3,218	1.21
Total valid votes	266,327	100
Source: Manuel Statistique

Nationality	XXII (%)
Czechoslovak parties (Note: Rusyn parties usually ran with Czechoslovak parties.)	65.82
Communists	15.24
Magyar-German parties	11.44
Polish-Jewish parties	6.30
German parties	1.21
Source: Manuel Statistique

== Aftermath ==
On 7 December 1929 František Udržal formed a coalition government of Czechoslovak Agrarians, Czechoslovak People's Party, Czechoslovak Social Democrats, Czechoslovak National Socialists, Czechoslovak National Democrats, Czechoslovak Traders' Party, German Agrarians and German Social Democrats. Whilst the cabinet was politically broadened after the 1929 elections, it lacked representation from Slovak populists, German Clericals or the Magyar parties.
