= Jihlava 10th electoral district (Czechoslovakia) =

Coordinates: 49°16′N 15°47′E

X. Electoral District
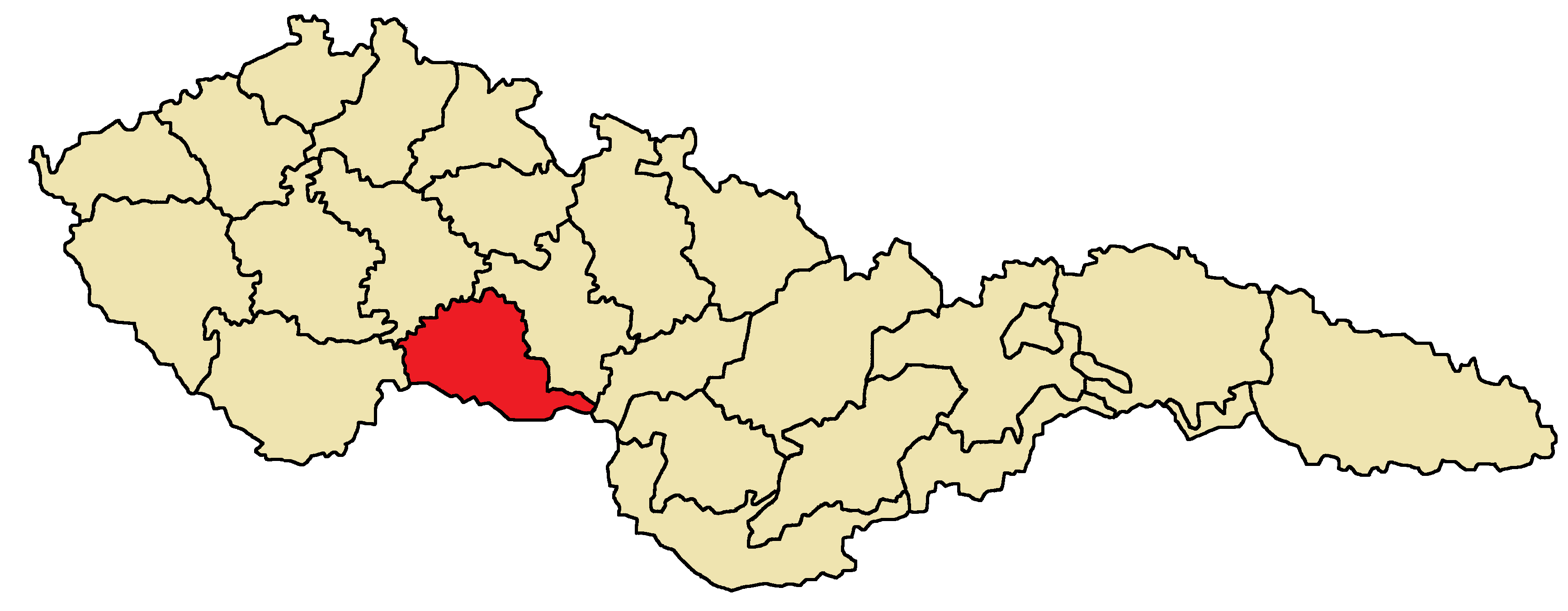

The Jihlava 10th electoral district ('XX. Jihlava') was a parliamentary constituency in the First Czechoslovak Republic for elections to the Chamber of Deputies. The seat of the District Electoral Commission was in the town of Jihlava. The constituency elected 9 members of the Chamber of Deputies.

== Delimitation ==
The electoral district covered the counties of Velká Bíteš, Moravské Budějovice, Dačice, Hrotovice, Jaroslavice, Jemnice, Jihlava, Moravský Krumlov, Velké Meziříčí, Mikulov, Náměšť nad Oslavou, Slavonice, Telč, Třebíč, Třešť, Vranov and Znojmo.

== Demographics ==
The 1921 Czechoslovak census estimated that the Jihlava 10th electoral district had 432,310 inhabitants. Thus there was one Chamber of Deputies member for each 48,034 inhabitants, somewhat above than the national average of 45,319 inhabitants per seat. As of the 1930 census Jihlava 10th electoral district had 435,177 inhabitants (48,353 inhabitants/seat).

== Senate elections ==
In election to the Senate the Jihlava 10th electoral district was part of the Brno 6th senatorial electoral district, together with the Brno 11th and Uherské Hradiště 13th electoral districts. The Brno 6th senatorial electoral district elected 17 senators.

== 1920 election ==
In the 1920 Czechoslovak parliamentary election Franz Pittinger (Farmers' League, BdL) and Dr. Emmerich Radda (German National Party, DNP) were elected, being candidates of the bourgeois unity list of the German Christian Social People's Party (DCSVP).

== 1925 election ==
Amongst the deputies elected from the Jihlava 10th electoral district in the 1920 Czechoslovak parliamentary election were Johann Wagner (BdL) and Erwin Zajicek (DCSVP).

== 1929 election ==
In the 1929 Czechoslovak parliamentary election in the Jihlava 10the electoral district Czechoslovak parties obtained 62.5% of the votes and German parties 29.9%. Zajicek and Wagner were re-elected. Viktor Stern of the Communist Party of Czechoslovakia was elected, he had previously represented the Česká Lípa 5th electoral district.

| Party | Votes | % |
|---|---|---|
| Republican Party of Agrarian and Smallholding Peoples | 44,401 | 19.17 |
| Czechoslovak People's Party | 42,324 | 18.28 |
| Czechoslovak Social Democratic Workers Party | 25,787 | 11.14 |
| German Christian Social People's Party | 25,078 | 10.83 |
| German Electoral Coalition | 19,232 | 8.31 |
| Czechoslovak National Socialist Party | 18,129 | 7.83 |
| Communist Party of Czechoslovakia | 16,010 | 6.91 |
| German National Party | 11,177 | 4.83 |
| Czechoslovak Traders' Party | 11,027 | 4.76 |
| German Social Democratic Workers Party | 9,911 | 4.28 |
| German National Socialist Workers' Party | 3,774 | 1.63 |
| Czechoslovak National Democracy | 3,137 | 1.35 |
| United Jewish and Polish Parties | 1,570 | 0.68 |
| Total | 231,557 | 100 |

== 1935 election ==
In the 1935 Czechoslovak parliamentary election Zajicek was re-elected for a third term. Newcomers to the Chamber of Deputies from the electoral district included Dr. Theodor Jilly (Sudeten German Party, SdP), Franz Karmasin (SdP) and Anton Sogl (SdP). Karmasin would later become the Slovak Secretary of State for German Affairs and then a Waffen-SS Sturmbannführer. Whilst the DCSVP was weakened across all of Czechoslovakia in the 1935 vote, it retained some degree of strength in the Jihlava 10th electoral district (losing some 10,000 votes compared to 1929).
