= Košice 20th electoral district =

XX. Electoral District
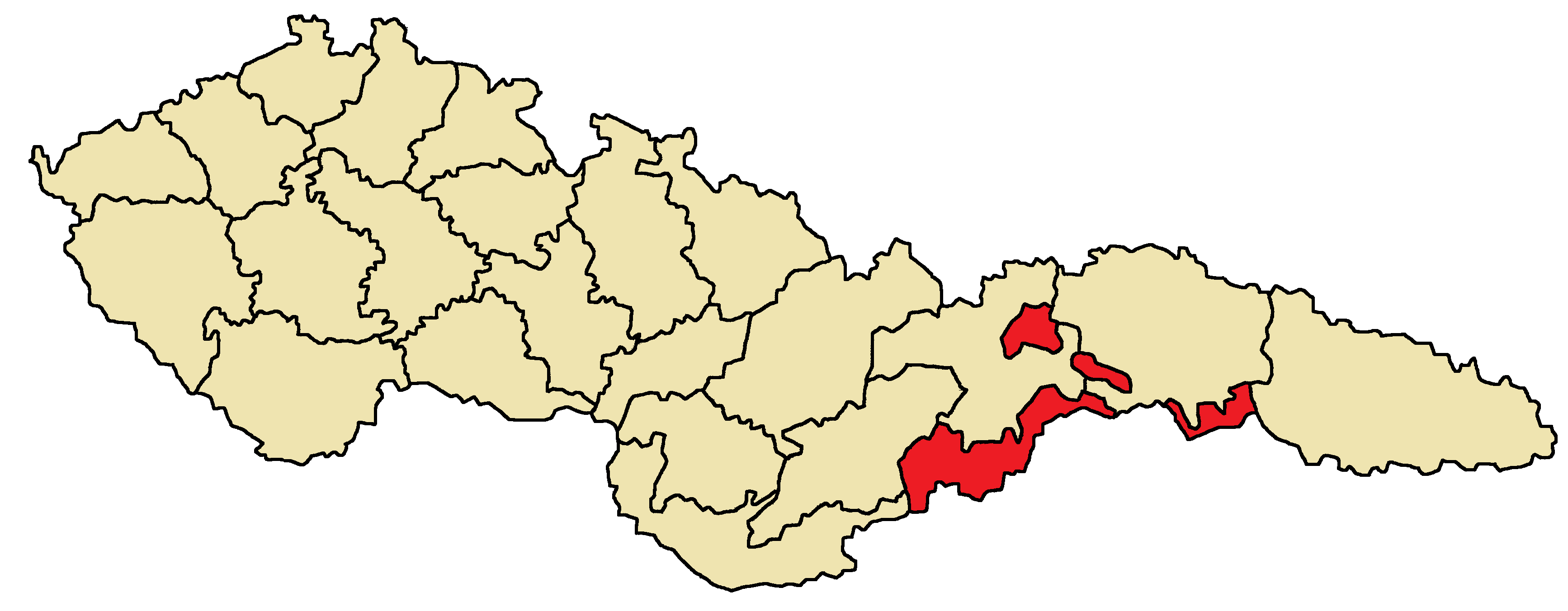

The Košice 20th electoral district ('XX. Košice') was a parliamentary constituency in the First Czechoslovak Republic for elections to the Chamber of Deputies. The seat of the District Electoral Commission was in the town of Košice. The constituency elected 7 members of the Chamber of Deputies.

== Demographics ==
The boundaries of the Kosice 20th electoral district as well as Nové Zámky 16th electoral district had been drawn to maximize the number of Hungarian and German voters in these districts. 96% of all Hungarians and 59% of all Germans in Slovakia lived in these two electoral districts.

The 1921 Czechoslovak census estimated that the Košice 20th electoral district had 400,669 inhabitants. Thus there was one Chamber of Deputies member for each 57,238 inhabitants, far more than the national average of 45,319 inhabitants per seat. Only the Užhorod 23rd electoral district (i.e. Subcarpathian Rus') had a higher amount of inhabitants per seat that the Košice districts in all of Czechoslovakia. As of the 1930 census Nove Zámky 16th electoral district had the third-highest number of inhabitants per seat (61,729/seat), after Užhorod and Nové Zámky.

== Senate elections ==
In election to the Senate the Košice 20th electoral district and the Nové Zamky 16th electoral district together formed the Nové Zámky 9th senatorial electoral district (which elected 9 senators), in spite of the fact that the two electoral districts were geographically separated.

== 1929 election ==
| Party | Votes | % |
|---|---|---|
| Provincial Christian-Socialist Party | 70,474 | 37.19 |
| Republican Party of Agrarian and Smallholding Peoples | 29,865 | 15.76 |
| Communist Party of Czechoslovakia | 29,518 | 15.58 |
| Hlinka's Slovak People's Party | 19,376 | 10.22 |
| Czechoslovak Social Democratic Workers Party | 12,792 | 6.75 |
| Czechoslovak National Socialist Party | 7,467 | 3.94 |
| United Jewish and Polish Parties | 4,991 | 2.63 |
| Czechoslovak National Democracy | 4,912 | 2.59 |
| Czechoslovak Traders' Party | 4,037 | 2.13 |
| German Electoral Coalition | 1,945 | 1.03 |
| Czechoslovak People's Party | 1,601 | 0.84 |
| Provincial Party of Smallholders, Entrepreneurs and Workers | 1,168 | 0.62 |
| German Social Democratic Workers Party | 1,011 | 0.53 |
| League Against Bound Tickets | 348 | 0.18 |
| Total | 189,505 | 100 |
