= Bund deutscher Gewerkschaften =

Bund deutscher Gewerkschaften ('League of German Trade Unions') was a German völkisch trade union centre in Czechoslovakia. The organization was founded in 1934. Politically it was linked to the German National Party. It had its headquarters in Tetschen. Its main union was the Deutsche Arbeitnehmergewerkschaft, Tetschen ('German Work-Takers Trade Union, Tetschen', D.A.N.T.). D.A.N.T. had 6,278 members as of around 1934.

By 1937, Bund deutscher Gewerkschaften was estimated to have 12,400 members. By 1938 D.A.N.T. was its sole affiliated union. D.A.N.T. supported the Sudetendeutsche Volkshilfe ('Sudeten German People's Aid'). D.A.N.T. won 3 out of 133 seats in the 1937 Czechoslovak factory workers representative election.
