= DNP =

DNP may refer to:

== Science and technology ==
- 2,4-Dinitrophenol, a toxic small organic molecule formerly marketed as a pharmaceutical "diet aid"
- Deoxyribonucleoprotein, a complex of DNA and protein
- Distance to neutral point, a quantity which is important when considering thermal expansion mismatch
- Distributed Network Protocol (DNP3), a protocol used in SCADA systems for communication with remote terminal units and intelligent electronic devices
- "Do not populate" or "do not place", a term used in printed circuit board design to denote the omitting of a component
- Dynamic nuclear polarization, a technique used in NMR spectroscopy

== Government and politics ==
- German National Party (German: Deutsche Nationalpartei), a former German political party in Czechoslovakia
- "Duty Not Paid", in the context of cigarette smuggling
- Dutch National Police, the police agency in the Netherlands

== Other uses ==
- Dai Nippon Printing, the world's largest printing company, based in Japan
- Defects notification period (applicable to a construction contract), an additional period of time following completion during which the duty to perform the contract continues to exist
- Deosai National Park, Pakistan
- Der Neue Pauly, a more compact edition of Realencyclopädie der classischen Altertumswissenschaft (Pauly-Wissowa)
- Doctor of Nursing Practice, a professional doctorate in nursing
- "Did not play", a label seen in sports box scores. Also see Glossary of basketball terms
