= Roma Civic Initiative =

The Roma Civic Initiative (Rómska občianska iniciatíva - ROI) is a Roma minority political party, now based in Slovakia.

The party was originally established in Czechoslovakia on November 21, 1989, immediately following the Velvet Revolution. As part of the Civic Forum, and with lawyer Emil Ščuka as its leader, the party managed to win seats in all the branches of government during Czechoslovakia's first post-communist democratic elections in 1990. The party was naturally split during the Dissolution of Czechoslovakia, but internal divisions led to further splits, and the party eventually dissolved. In the Czech Republic Ščuka maintained the leadership of the ROI until 2001, while also becoming General Secretary of the International Romani Union. The party was finally removed from the rolls of Czech political parties in 2005.

In Slovakia, the party re-emerged and re-registered itself in 2005, to join other Roma parties such as Rómska Inteligencia za Spolunažívanie, the Strana Ochrany Práv Rómov, the Strana Jednoty Rómov, and the Strana Rómskych Demokratov.
