= Sudeten German Rural League =

Sudeten German Rural League Sudetendeutscher Landbund
- Leader: Josef Mayer
- Founded: 25 March 1928
- Dissolved: 1935
- Split from: Farmers' League
- Ideology: German nationalism Antisemitism; Agrarianism; Negativism
- Political position: Far-right

Sudetendeutscher Landbund ('Sudeten German Rural League', SdLB) was a Sudeten German political party in interwar Czechoslovakia. The party was founded in 1928, following a split in the Farmers' League. The founding party congress was held in Brno on 25 March 1928. The founders of SdLB had constituted the völkisch wing of the Farmers' League. SdLB was a German nationalist farmers party, opposed to Czechoslovak statehood. Georg Hanreich and Josef Mayer served as chairmen of the party.

SdLB contested the 1929 Czechoslovak parliamentary election in alliance with the German National Party. Hanreich was elected to the Chamber of Deputies. He was a member of the DNP parliamentary faction until 6 October 1933, after which he stayed as an independent.

The party published the newspaper Sudetendeutscher Landbote from Brno.

The party was dissolved in 1935.
