= Romska Inteligencia za Spolunazivanie =

Romska Inteligencia za Spolunazivanie is a political party of the Romany minority of Slovakia. Its policies are centre to left-wing with a focus on Romany rights and culture.
