= Juriga's Slovak People's Party =

Juriga's Slovak People's Party Jurigova slovenská strana ľudová
- Leader: ThDr. Ferdinand Juriga
- Founded: 1925
- Dissolved: 15 December 1938
- Split from: HSĽS
- Merged into: HSĽS-SSNJ
- Newspaper: Slovenské ľudové noviny
- Ideology: Political Catholicism; Slovak nationalism
- Political position: Right-wing
- Colours: Gray

Juriga's Slovak People's Party (Slovak: Jurigova slovenská strana ľudová) was a political party in Slovakia. The party was founded in 1929 as a split from the Hlinka's Slovak People's Party. The leaders of Juriga's Slovak People's Party, Ferdiš Juriga and Florián Tománek, had been expelled from Hlinka's Slovak People's Party in February 1929 because they opposed party leader Andrej Hlinka's support for Vojtech Tuka during his treason trial. The party published Slovenské ľudové noviny as its organ.

Juriga's Slovak People's Party contested the 1929 Czechoslovak parliamentary election. The party ran candidates in three electoral districts. It failed to win any seats, obtaining 2,752 votes (1.27%) in Trnava electoral district, 691 votes (0.43%) in Banská Bystrica electoral district and 1,952 votes (0.61%) in Nové Zámky 16th electoral district.
