= German Electoral Coalition =

The German Electoral Coalition (German: Deutsche Wahlgemeinschaft, Czech: Německé volební společenství) was a political alliance in Czechoslovakia representing Sudeten Germans.

== History ==
The alliance was established for the 1929 elections as an alliance of the Farmers' League (BdL), the German Labour and Economic Community (DAWG) and the Carpathian German Party (KdP, led by Dr. Roland Steinacker). DAWG, in turn, was an alliance between DDFP (led by Prof. Bruno Kafka) and the DNP faction led by Dr. Alfred Rosche.

It received 5.4% of the national vote, winning 16 seats in the Chamber of Deputies and nine in the Senate. No candidate belonging to KdP was elected.

== Results by district (Chamber of Deputies) ==
| # | Electoral district | Votes | % | Seats | MPs elected |
|---|---|---|---|---|---|
| IA. | Prague A | 7,971 | 1.61 | 1 / 24 | Bruno Kafka (DAWG/DDFP) |
| IB. | Prague B | 7,558 | 1.42 | | |
| II. | Pardubice | 12,368 | 4.63 | 1 / 11 | Franz Spina (BdL) |
| III. | Hradec Králové | 20,221 | 6.79 | | |
| IV. | Ml. Boleslav | 26,786 | 5.98 | 1 / 17 | Franz Windirsch (BdL) |
| V. | Česká Lípa | 67,778 | 19.35 | 3 / 13 | Rudolf Böhm (BdL), Franz Heller (BdL) Alfred Rosche (DAWG/Rosche Group) |
| VI. | Louny | 31,297 | 6.69 | 1 / 17 | Georg Böllmann (VI. Louny, BdL) |
| VII. | Karlovy Vary | 49,085 | 15.84 | 3 / 12 | Christof Gläsel (BdL), Franz Viereckl (BdL), Gustav Peters (DAWG/Rosche Group) |
| VIII. | Plzeň | 43,260 | 10.56 | 1 / 17 | Wolfgang Zierhut (BdL) |
| IX. | České Budějovice | 22,648 | 7.86 | 1 / 13 | Johann Platzer (BdL) |
| X. | Jihlava | 19,232 | 8.31 | 1 / 9 | Hans Wagner (BdL) |
| XI. | Brno | 18,328 | 4.24 | 1 / 17 | Josef Jelinek (DAWG/DDFP) |
| XII. | Olomouc | 32,744 | 7.41 | 1 / 17 | Franz Hodina (BdL) |
| XIII. | Uherské Hradiště | 991 | 0.49 | | |
| XIV. | Mor. Ostrava | 19,265 | 3.73 | 1 / 19 | Otto Halke (BdL) |
| XV. | Trnava | 2,156 | 0.99 | | |
| XVI. | Nové Zámky | 4,268 | 1.34 | | |
| XVII. | Turč. Sv. Martin | 2,196 | 0.93 | | |
| XVIII. | Báňská Bystrica | 2,732 | 1.72 | | |
| XIX. | Lipt. Sv. Mikuláš | 407 | 0.35 | | |
| XX. | Košice | 1,945 | 1.03 | | |
| XXI. | Prešov | - | - | | |
| XXII. | Užhorod | 3,218 | 1.21 | | |
| Czechoslovakia: | | 396,454 | 5.37 | 16 / 300 | |
Source: Manuel Statistique de la Republique Tchecoslovaque

== Senators elected ==
The senators elected were Carl Kostka (DAWG/DDFP), Franz Ickert (BdL), Josef Kahler (BdL), Andreas Lippert (BdL), Anton Lichtneckert (BdL), Josef Luksch (BdL), Adolf Scholz (BdL), Erdmann Spies (BdL) and Robert Stöhr (BdL).
