= National Fascist Community =

National Fascist Community Czech: Národní obec fašistická Slovak: Národná obec fašistická
- Leader: Radola Gajda
- Founded: March 1926
- Dissolved: 22 November 1938
- Split from: Czechoslovak National Democracy
- Merged into: Party of National Unity
- Headquarters: Prague
- Ideology: Fascism; Antisemitism; Anti-communism; Pan-Slavism; Anti-Hungarian sentiment Czechoslovak nationalism Anti-German sentiment
- Political position: Far-right
- Colours: Black
- Slogan: "Blaho vlasti budiž nejvyšším zákonem" (English: Let the Welfare of the Homeland be the Supreme Law)
- Anthem: "Hej, Slované"U.S. Navy Band

The National Fascist Community (Czech: Národní obec fašistická, NOF, sometimes translated as National Fascist League) was a Czechoslovak fascist movement led by Radola Gajda, and based on the fascism of Benito Mussolini. It was responsible for the only fascist coup in Czechoslovak history.

== Formation and ideology ==
The party was formed in March 1926 by the merger of a group of dissident National Democrats known as the "Red-Whites" with various other rightist groups across Bohemia and Moravia. It was distinguished by a strong current of opposition to Germany, which continued even after Adolf Hitler had come to power. The NOF instead looked to Italy as its model, and based itself wholly on Mussolini's National Fascist Party. In this respect it differed markedly from its chief rival Vlajka, which was firmly in the Hitler camp. Groups targeted by the NOF for criticism included the Jews, communists, the Czechoslovak government and the Magyars. It set up a youth group and a trade union movement, although the latter was minor. The group also advocated a policy of Pan-Slavism, and hoped to take a joint lead with Poland of a grand Slavic alliance that would overthrow communism in the Soviet Union. They also believed in a corporatist economy with a large agricultural sector. The NOF attracted some early support from veterans of the Czechoslovak Legions. It was estimated by a government informer that the NOF had as many as 200,000 followers in 1926, albeit it had virtually no support in the Slovak area as the far right there was dominated by an indigenous movement.

== Failed coup ==
The NOF planned a fascist coup d'etat and secured the support of Slovak paramilitary group Rodobrana in this endeavour, albeit the plans were intercepted by Brno police. On the night of 21–22 January 1933, 70 to 80 men of the NOF attacked the Svatoplukova Barracks in Brno, hoping to start a nationwide coup. However, Czechoslovak troops, with the help of gendarmes, were able to repel the attack. One rebel was killed during the fighting. The leader of the coup, retired Lieutenant Ladislav Kobsinek, fled the country, but was later extradited to Czechoslovakia and sentenced to 12 years in prison. Other rebels received sentences of several years. Although he did not directly participate in the coup, General Radol Gajda received a six-month sentence. Kobsinek was paroled in 1939. During World War II, he collaborated with Nazi Germany. After the war, Kobsinek was sentenced to 12 years in prison. In 1957, he was released from prison and deported to Germany, where he died in 1988.

== Popularity of the party and dissolution ==
In the 1929 elections the NOF ran under the name "Against Fixed-Order Lists" but won three seats. Gajda was elected to Parliament, but the party failed to maintain its support, and received only 2% of the vote and seven seats in Chamber of Deputies in the elections of 1935.

The NOF attempted a comeback during the German occupation, albeit the Nazis did not support due to their earlier criticism and their overall minor status. Ultimately the NOF were disbanded and largely absorbed into the puppet National Partnership, Gajda having been bribed to leave politics. The party's demise was sealed in late 1939 when they organised a rally in Prague's Wenceslas Square and only managed to attract 300 supporters.

== Electoral results ==
Chamber of Deputies
Election year	# of overall votes	% of overall vote	# of overall seats won	+/–	Leader
1935	167,433 (#12)	2.0	6 / 300	▲6	

Senate
Election year	# of overall votes	% of overall vote	# of overall seats won	+/–	Leader
1935	145,125 (#13)	2.0	0 / 150	▲	
