= Česká Lípa 5th electoral district (Czechoslovakia) =

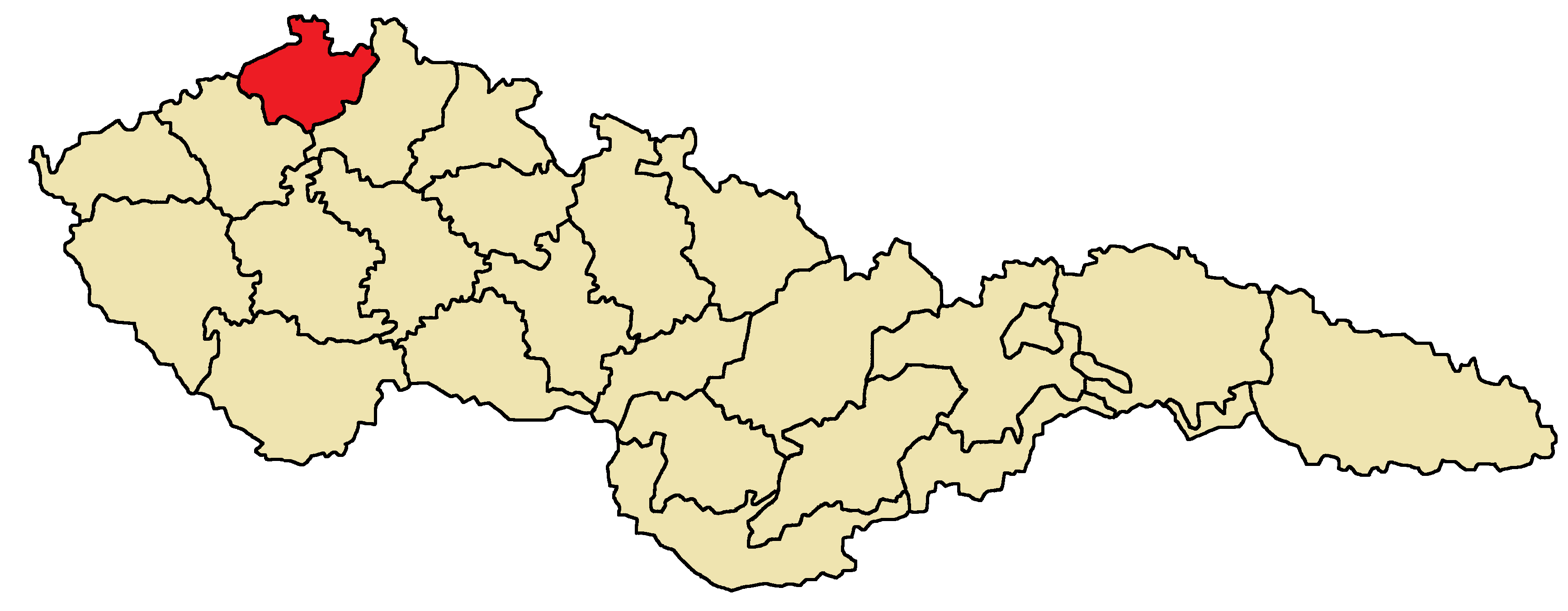
Česká Lípa 5th electoral district

The Česká Lípa 5th electoral district (German: Wahlkreise V. Böhmisch-Leipa) was a parliamentary constituency in Czechoslovakia. It was one of two parliamentary constituencies with an overwhelming ethnic German majority amongst the voters (the other being the Karlsbad district). The Česká Lípa 5th electoral district elected 13 members of the Chamber of Deputies. In February 1921, the Czechoslovak authorities estimated that the electoral district had a total population of 564,449.

== Geographic coverage ==
The constituency covered Benešov nad Ploučnicí, Česká Kamenice, Česká Lípa, Chabařovice, Chrastava, Cvikov, Děčín, Dubá, Jablonné v Podještědí, Lipová, Litoměřice, Mimoň, Nový Bor, Rumburk, Šluknov, Štětí, Úštěk, Ústí nad Labem and Varnsdorf. For elections to the Czechoslovak Senate the areas of the 5th Chamber of Deputies electoral district were included in the 3rd Senate electoral district (Mladá Boleslav).

== Deputies elected ==
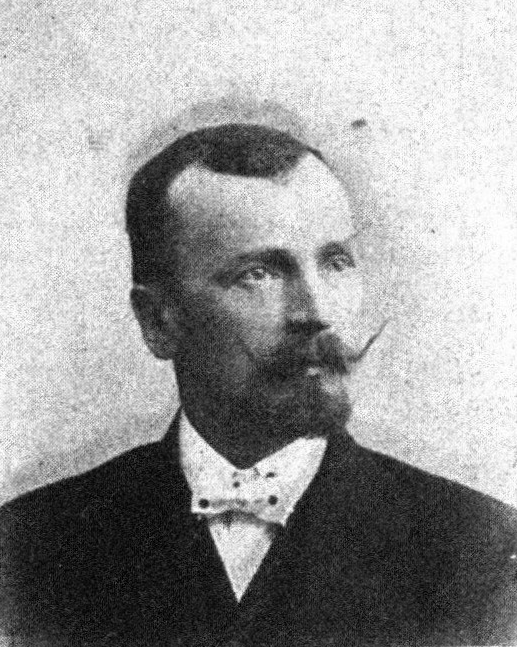
Vinzenz Kraus in 1907

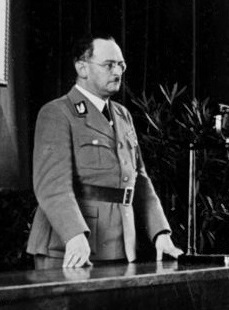
Hans Krebs in 1938

Amongst the deputies elected from the 5th electoral district in the Czechoslovak parliamentary election, 1920 were Franz Beutel (DSAP, elected to the Senate from the 3rd district in 1925 and 1929), Karl Čermak (DSAP, died in October 1924, replaced by Rudolf Schiller), Rudolf Fischer (DSAP, contested the Senate election in 1925), Ernst Grünzner (DSAP, re-elected in 1925 and 1929, elected to the Senate in 1935 from the 3rd district), Eduard Hausmann (DSAP, resigned his seat in February 1925), Irene Kirpal (DSAP, re-elected in 1925, 1929 and 1935), Josef Schweichhart (DSAP, re-elected in 1925 and 1929), Josef Böhr (DCSVP, elected to the Senate from the 3rd district in 1925 and 1929), Franz Seraphim Heller (BdL, re-elected in 1925 and 1930), Franz Krepek (BdL, elected to the Senate from the 3rd district in 1925), Josef Kleibl (DNP, re-elected in 1925 and 1929, resigned from DNP October 10, 1933 and remained an independent), Vinzenz Kraus (DNP, re-elected in 1925, died in March 1926), Leo Wenzel (DNSAP, re-elected in 1925, elected to the Senate from the 3rd district in 1929).

Hans Krebs of DNSAP was one of the deputies from the 5th electoral district from 1925 until 1933. Franz May of the Sudeten German Party was one of the deputies from the district from 1935 until 1938.
