= German National Party =

German National Party Deutsche Nationalpartei
- Founded: 1919
- Dissolved: 11 December 1933
- Merger of: German Radical Party; German People's Party
- Merged into: Sudeten German Party
- Ideology: German nationalism Negativism
- Political position: Right-wing

The German Nationalist Party (German: Deutsche Nationalpartei, DNP, Czech: Německá národní strana) was a First Republic political party in Czechoslovakia, representing the German population of Sudetenland. Its chairman and political face was Rudolf Lodgman von Auen.

In elections, the DNP worked together with the German National Socialist Workers' Party (DNSAP). Both parties were outlawed in 1933. A faction of the DNP then entered the Sudetendeutsche Heimatfront of Konrad Henlein.

The main party newspaper was the Nordböhmisches Tagblatt (North Bohemian Daily) published in Děčín.

== See also ==
- Germans in Czechoslovakia (1918-1938)
