= Hungarian invasion of Carpatho-Ukraine =

1939 military conflict

- Part of the prelude to World War II
Date	13–18 March 1939
Location	Carpatho-Ukraine
Result	Hungarian-Polish victory
Territorial changes	Hungarian occupation and annexation

Belligerents
Hungary Poland Supported by: Germany	Carpatho-Ukraine OUN Czechoslovakia (until 16 March)	Czechoslovakia (since 16 March)

Commanders and leaders
Miklós Horthy; András Littay; Ferenc Szombathelyi; Miklós Kozma; Edmund Charaszkiewicz	Avgustyn Voloshyn; Dmytro Kłympusz; Mychajło Kołodzinskyj (executed); Zenon Kossak (executed); Roman Shukhevych; Oleg Svátek; Lev Prchala	Bohumil Mařík; Lev Prchala; Oleg Svátek

Units involved
Carpathian Group; Irregular troops; Charaszkiewicz's troops	12th Division; Border Security (StOS); Carpathian Sich	

Strength
> 25,000; Other estimates: 18,000; 500 guns; 50 tanks; 15 aircraft	± 8,000; Other estimates: 2,700 (Czechoslovak); 1,500 (Ukrainian); 6 light tanks LT-35 (Czechoslovak); 4 armored vehicles OA vz.30 (Czechoslovak)	

Casualties and losses
72 killed, 164 wounded, 3 missing and 2 prisoners (official Hungarian statistics); ± 200 killed and several hundred wounded (Czechoslovak and Ukrainian estimates)	1,500 killed and wounded	
- 27,000 Ukrainian civilians killed 75,000 fled to Ukrainian SSR (~60,000 of them died in Gulag camps); 60,000 deported to Hungary or Third Reich for forced labour

The Hungarian invasion of Carpatho-Ukraine was a 1939 military conflict between the Kingdom of Hungary and Carpatho-Ukraine. During the invasion a series of clashes took place between the Hungarian and Polish troops against the paramilitary formations of the Carpathian Sich of Carpathian Ukraine and some Czech troops who remained in the region after the Czechoslovak army was disbanded. The war ended with the occupation and subsequent annexation of the territory of Transcarpathian Ukraine (Subcarpathian Rus') to the Kingdom of Hungary.

This territory was later invaded by the Soviet Union and integrated into its Ukrainian SSR.

== Background ==
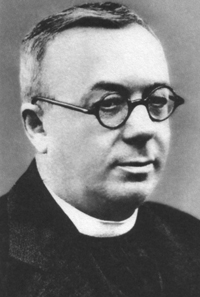
Avgustyn Voloshyn

After the collapse of the Austro-Hungarian Empire, Transcarpathia became part of Czechoslovakia. Finally, the status of the territory was confirmed by the Treaty of Trianon in 1920. The Treaty of Trianon deprived Hungary of 71.5% of its territory before the war. The country was divided amongst the states bordering the then Kingdom of Hungary. Hungary was forbidden to use aircraft, tanks, and heavy artillery. The maximum number of the Hungarian army, which could be formed only of volunteers, should not exceed 35 thousand people. The navy, including the ships of the Danube Flotilla, was handed over to the Allies.

The political situation in Transcarpathia during the Interwar period was difficult. Ukrainophiles, led by Augustyn Voloshyn wanted autonomy within the Czechoslovak Republic, Russophiles, represented by the Autonomous Agrarian Union of Andriy Brody and the Italian Fascism inspired Russian National Autonomous Party of Stepan Fentsyk, supported autonomy within Hungary, the United Hungarian Party (about 10% of the vote) demanded a return to Hungary, and the Communists (up to 25% of the vote) wanted to join Soviet Ukraine. Thus, in the 1935 elections, 63% of the votes went to supporters of full autonomy, accession to Hungary or Soviet Ukraine, and only 25% to supporters of Czechoslovakia. All Czech parties in Carpathian Ruthenia opposed autonomy.

In the 1930s, Hungary began to openly ignore the terms of the Treaty of Trianon and put the economy on a military footing. In early autumn 1938, Hungary, taking advantage of the Sudeten crisis, also began territorial encroachments on Czechoslovakia. According to the provisions of the Munich Agreement signed by four major powers (Great Britain, Nazi Germany, Kingdom of Italy and the French Third Republic) on September 30, 1938, the Czechoslovak government was required to resolve the issue of belonging of the Upper Hungary with the Kingdom of Hungary within three months. It was these lands that Hungary lost in 1920 under the Treaty of Trianon.

Bilateral Czechoslovak-Hungarian talks took place from October 9 to 13 in Komárno, but ended in vain. On October 11, the authorities of the Czechoslovak "autonomous land" of Subcarpathian Rus' gained self-government, and on October 20, a resolution supported a plebiscite on the territory's membership in the Kingdom of Hungary. However, five days later, Subcarpathian Prime Minister Andriy Brody, representing pro-Hungarian circles, was arrested in Prague, and was replaced by Foreign Minister Augustyn Voloshyn, who agreed to consider only the transfer of territories to the Kingdom of Hungary. with a predominantly Hungarian population, and rejected the idea of a plebiscite.

Results of parliamentary elections in Subcarpathian Rus'
Parties		1924	1925	1929	1935
	Communist	39.4%	30.8%	15.2%	25.6%
Russophiles	AZS	8.3%	11.7%	18.3%	14.9%
Russophiles	KTP	7.9%	6.3%	18.3%	3.6%
Russophiles	RNP, RNAP	1.1%	1.3%	18.3%	9.3%
Hungarians	MNP	11.1%	11.8%	11.4%	11%
Hungarians	Others	2.3%	0.4%	–	–
Ukrainophiles	RKhP	4.4%	3%	3.4%	2.4%
Ukrainophiles	SDRPnPR	8.3%	7.4%	8.6%	9.6%
Jewish	ŽS	7.1%	7.8%	6.3%	9.6%
Jewish	ŽKS	3.9%	4.8%	29.1%	19.6%
Czechoslovaks	RSZML	5.9%	13.9%	29.1%	19.6%
Czechoslovaks	Others	0.5%	–	2.8%	2.8%

== First Vienna Award ==
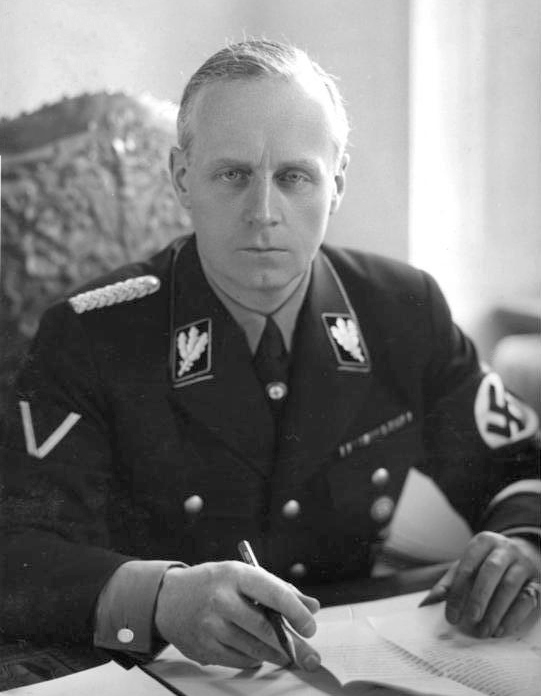
Joachim von Ribbentrop

The head of the Hungarian delegation at the talks in Komárno, the Minister of Foreign Affairs of the Kingdom of Hungary Kálmán Kánya, asked the signatories of the Munich Agreement to act as judges on the issue of delimitation. As the United Kingdom and the French Republic withdrew, German Foreign Minister Joachim von Ribbentrop and Italian Foreign Minister Galeazzo Ciano became arbitrators. On October 29, the Czechoslovak Republic and the Kingdom of Hungary formally proposed to Italy and Germany that an arbitration be held, agreeing in advance with its results.

At the arbitration held on November 2, 1938, in Vienna, the Czechoslovak delegation, among others, prepared to present their views, as well as the representatives of Carpathian Ukraine (Avgustyn Voloshyn) and of Slovakia (Jozef Tiso), but at the initiative of Ribbentrop they were not given the floor, because autonomy, which they represented could not be considered as a third party. By the First Vienna Award, the Kingdom of Hungary was given territories with an area of 11,927 km^{2}, including the Carpatho-Ukrainian territory (1,537 km^{2}). Between 57% and 84% of their population were Hungarians, according to Czechoslovak and Hungarian statistics, respectively.

Carpathian Ukraine then lost its two main cities (Uzhgorod and Mukachevo) as well as all fertile lands. On November 12, they were officially incorporated into the Kingdom of Hungary by a resolution of the country's parliament. However, the decisions of the First Vienna Award did not satisfy the acquiring country, Hungary did not resign on the restoration of her old borders.

== Preparation ==
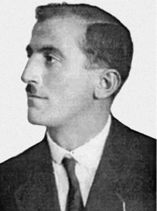
Dmytro Klympush

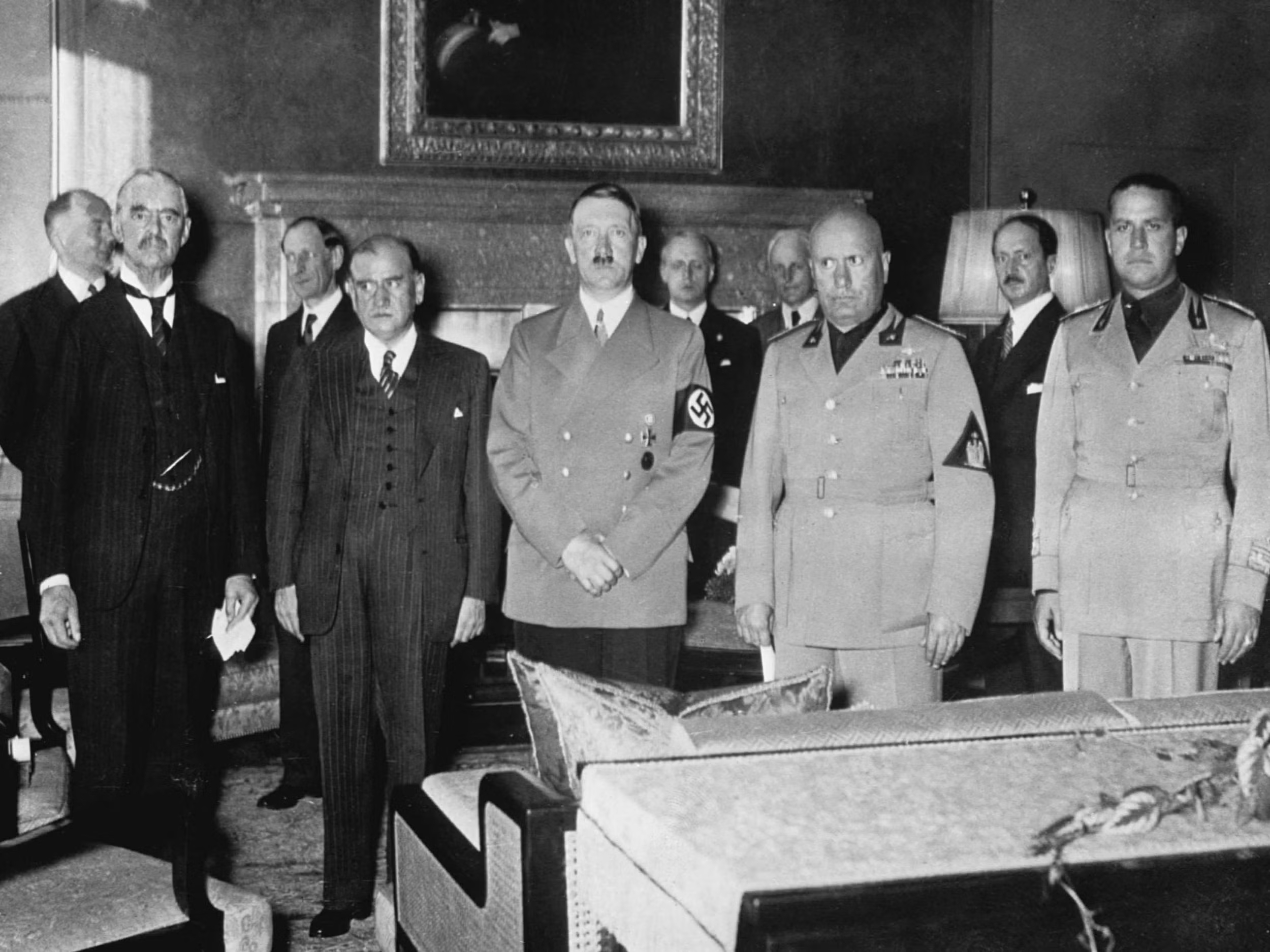
During the Munich Agreement of September 29, 1938: Neville Chamberlain, Edouard Daladier, Adolf Hitler, Benito Mussolini and Galeazzo Ciano

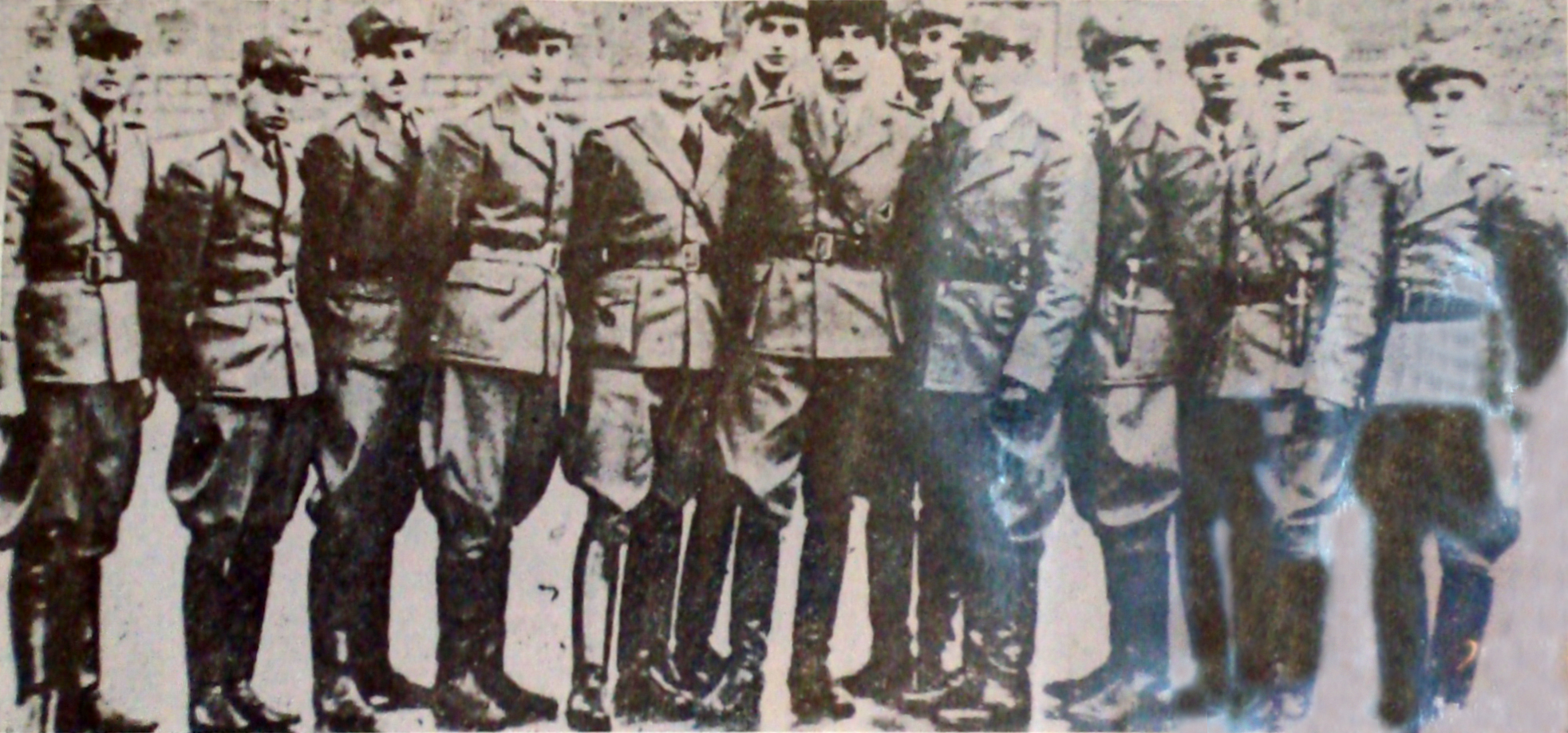
A group of Carpathian Sich members led by Commandant Dmytro Klympush

The Hungarian government intensified negotiations with the Second Polish Republic, which had long incited the Kingdom of Hungary to seize Subcarpathian Rus' by force. Negotiations with the Kingdom of Italy also continued, but Galeazzo Ciano recommended abandoning plans to occupy Subcarpathia; in addition, Hitler, dissatisfied with the rapprochement of the Kingdom of Hungary and the Republic of Poland, also warned the Hungarian government against such actions.

However, despite all these warnings, preparations for the invasion continued. The mobilized 6th Hungarian Corps was concentrated on the border. At the same time, the Kingdom of Hungary and the Republic of Poland isolated Carpathian Ukraine from the outside world, restricting telephone, telegraph and postal communications, and began an economic blockade. Hungarian and Polish saboteurs were thrown across the border. Fighting broke out between units of the Czech army and saboteurs, and Czech spies managed to reveal the affiliation of Polish troops.

On November 9, 1938, in connection with the increasing number of Hungarian-Polish sabotage cases, the government of Carpatho-Ukraine, based on the Ukrainian National Union (UNO) political party, established the Carpathian Sich People's Defense Organization (ONOKS), although the first Sich detachments appeared in the early 1930s as ordinary fire-fighting and cultural-educational societies, similar to those formed in neighboring Eastern Galicia. The leading role in ONOKS was played by OUN members who came to Transcarpathia from other regions of Ukraine, as well as from emigration.

Dmytro Klympush, a former officer of the Austro-Hungarian army, was appointed as commander-in-chief of the Sich, and Ivan Roman, a former officer of the Czechoslovak army, was appointed as deputy commander. In December, the autonomous government of Voloshin and the Czechoslovak General Staff reached an agreement on conducting military training of the Sich, and they received the weapons of the local national guard, the Domobranstva. At that time, there were about 2,000 trained Sich soldiers, or so-called full members of the Carpathian Sich. In general, Sich had about 2-3 thousand soldiers and about the same number of reservists.

On November 18, 1938, preparations for the invasion were completed, and it was scheduled for November 20. However, Nazi Germany intervened. The Germans believed that the Czechoslovak Republic would be able to resist, and the Wehrmacht, which was in the process of demobilization, would not be able to help the Hungarians, and therefore the Hungarians were "advised" not to take any action because of the unpredictability of their results. The military intervention was canceled, but the Kingdom of Hungary did not abandon its plans for Podkarpackie.

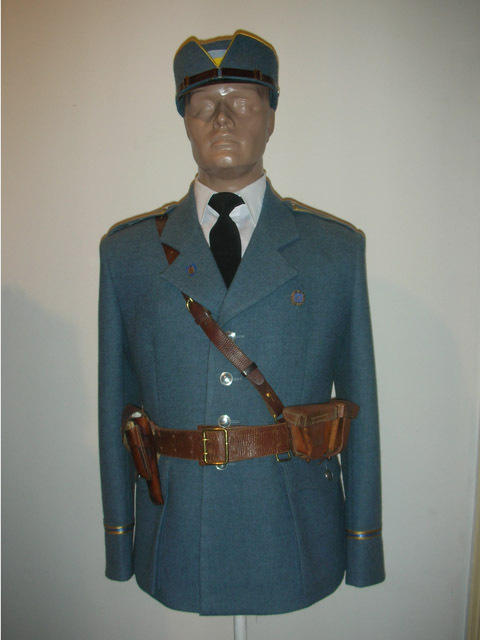
Uniform of the Sich man of Carpatho-Ukraine

On January 6, 1939, preparations for the invasion resumed, and General Bidza was appointed as commander of the operation. On January 19, 1939, the new Minister of Internal Affairs of Carpatho-Ukraine, General Lev Prchala, appointed by the President of the Czechoslovak Republic Emil Hácha without the consent of the autonomous leadership, arrived in Khust, then the capital of the Carpathian Autonomy.

The Prime Minister of Carpatho-Ukraine, Augustyn Voloshyn, received Lev Prchala only as a general in the federal army. The general was denied cooperation and a note was sent to the government of the Czechoslovak Republic, while Prchala himself told Voloshyn that he did not expect to face such difficulties and promised to personally ask the government to dismiss him as minister.

In response to these actions, the Carpatho-Ukrainian government removed the representative of Carpatho-Ukraine, Julian Revay, from the Czechoslovak government and reaffirmed General Prhala's authority as commander of the Czechoslovak army in Carpatho-Ukraine; in addition, in his hands concentrated the management of the Ministry of Internal Affairs, Finance and Communications of Carpatho-Ukraine.

The Kingdom of Hungary soon joined the anti-Comintern pact, and Hitler decided on the possibility of Hungarian occupation of Carpatho-Ukraine, subject to the interests of Nazi Germany.

== Warfare ==
=== March 12–14 ===
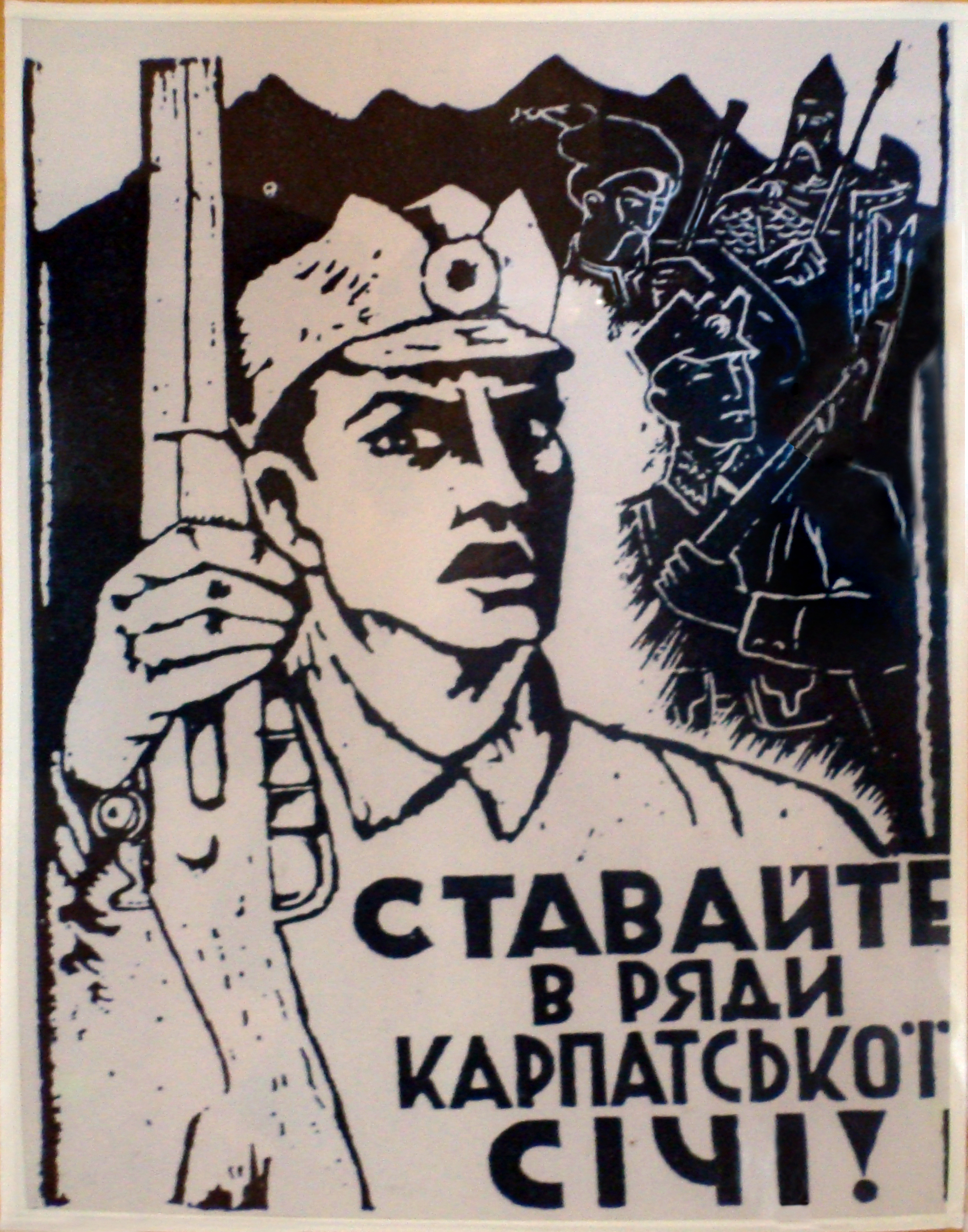
Campaign poster of the Carpathian Sich

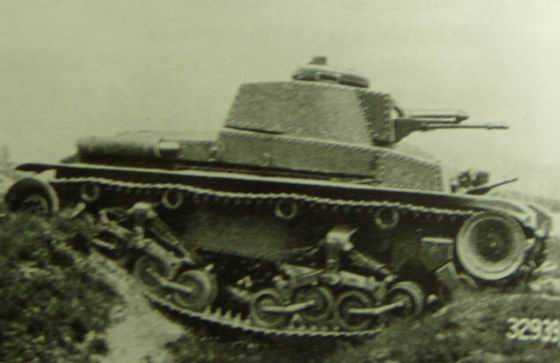
Panzer 35(t)

The capture of Carpatho-Ukraine by Hungarian troops was originally planned to begin on March 12, 1939, the day of the elections to the local Soim, but the German government rejected the idea, saying it would announce the start of the occupation.

The Hungarians concentrated 12 divisions of the VI Army on the border, and on the night of March 13–14, the Hungarian army began advancing deep into the territory of Carpatho-Ukraine with small forces.

At 2:00 a.m., units of the Carpathian Sich (then a 5,000-strong paramilitary organization) received weapons from the Khust gendarmerie (41 rifles and 90 pistols) to defend against the Hungarians on the orders of Prime Minister Augustyn Voloshyn.

At around 4 a.m., Ivan Roman, the deputy commander of the Carpathian Sich, received a call from Czech officers demanding that the weapons be returned to the warehouse. The commandant, referring to the decree of Augustin Voloshyn, flatly refused. In response, General Lev Prchala ordered units of the 45th Regiment stationed in Khust to seize weapons by force.

At 6:00 a.m., Czech troops, numbering 200 soldiers, armed with six light tanks (LT vz.35), four armored vehicles (OA vz.30), heavy guns, machine guns and mortars, attacked the main Sich buildings: Kish, "Sich Hotel ", The main team, "Women's Sect" and "Flying Variety". The leadership of autonomous Carpatho-Ukraine appealed to the Czechs to cease fire, but no response was received. The Sich began seizing weapons depots, office buildings, and disarming patrols. Armed clashes between the Sich and Czechoslovak troops lasted more than 8 hours. Barricades appeared on the streets of Khust, and constant street fights broke out.

At the same time, Prime Minister Voloshyn tried to resolve the conflict. Several attempts to call the central government were unsuccessful - Prague did not respond. After a telephone conversation between Prime Minister Augustyn Voloshyn (who strongly opposed an armed attack by Czechoslovak troops on Sich units) and General Lev Prchala, a truce was established in the streets: Czechoslovakia returned to the barracks and the Carpathian Sich disarmed.

According to various sources, the losses of the Sich ranged from 40 to 150 killed and about 50 wounded, the losses of the Czechoslovaks - from 7 to 20 soldiers and gendarmes killed. During the confrontation between Sich and the Czechoslovaks, Hungarian troops occupied three villages near Mukachevo.

On the morning of March 14, 1939, the commander of the eastern group of troops, General Lev Prchal, believing that the invasion of Hungarian troops had not been authorized by Berlin, ordered the beginning of the defense. However, after the declaration of the Protectorate of Bohemia and Moravia, he ordered on March 16 the evacuation of Czechoslovak troops and civil servants from the territory of Subcarpathian Ukraine. The evacuation took place in three directions: in the west - to the Slovak Republic, in the north - to the Republic of Poland and in the southeast - to the Kingdom of Romania. The last Czechoslovak troops left Khust in March 17.

=== March 15–17 ===
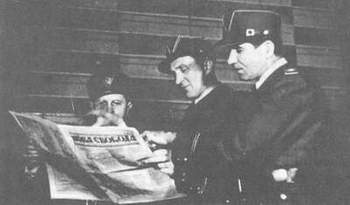
Chairman of the Carpathian Sich. From left to right: Ivan Rohach, Ivan Roman and Fedir Tatsynets

In these circumstances, on March 15, 1939, Augustyn Voloshyn proclaimed the independence of Carpatho-Ukraine by radio and sent a telegram to Adolf Hitler in Berlin, asking him to take the country under the protectorate of Nazi Germany. In response, the German government refused to support him and advised him not to resist Hungarian troops. On the same day, the Hungarian government sent a parliamentarian to Khust with a proposal to disarm and peacefully join the Kingdom of Hungary. Voloshyn refused, saying that "Carpatho-Ukraine is a peaceful state and wants to live in peace with its neighbors, but if necessary will repel any aggressor." Mobilization was announced in Transcarpathia.

In the evening of March 15, Hungarian troops launched a general offensive in four directions: Uzhhorod - Perechyn - Uzhok; Uzhhorod - Svaliava - Lavochne; Mukachevo - Irshava - Kushnytsia; Korolevo - Khust - Yasinya - Volove.

The Carpathian Sich recruited volunteers, mostly demobilized Czechoslovak army soldiers from the local population, and, with 10,000 to 12,000 poorly armed soldiers, tried to resist. The Hungarians struck the main blow along the Uzhhorod-Perechyn line, trying to cut off Carpathian Ukraine from the Slovak Republic. The Hungarian army encountered strong resistance near the village of Horonda, where sotnia "Sich" M. Stoyka held the defense for 16 hours.

Heavy fighting followed the cities of Khust and Vynohradiv, which repeatedly passed from hand to hand. The most bloody was the battle on the outskirts of Khust, on Krasne Pole. According to the Hungarian archives, 230 people from Sich were killed in this battle, and 160 Hungarians. The resistance of the Sich threatened to prolong the fighting, but the Poles came to the aid of the Hungarians, who began their offensive from the Uzhok Pass.

On the morning of March 16, a day after the declaration of independence, the government of Carpatho-Ukraine left Khust, heading for the Romanian border, and a few hours later Hungarian troops stormed the capital of Carpatho-Ukraine. The 24th Hungarian Border Guard Battalion and the 12th Scooter Battalion took part in the storming of the city, aircraft and anti-tank guns were also actively used. The Hungarians were opposed by more than 3,000 Sich soldiers, who were armed with 12 units of armored vehicles previously seized from the Czechoslovaks. Under the pressure of the oppressive forces of the enemy, the Sich were forced to retreat from the city.

On March 17, Hungarian troops captured Rakhiv, Yasinia, and Bushtyno. Voloshyn and his immediate entourage reached the Romanian border in the area of Velykyi Bychkiv via Tiachiv. From the Kingdom of Romania he moved to the Kingdom of Yugoslavia, and then via Vienna to Nazi-occupied Prague, where he was appointed rector of the local Ukrainian Free University and stayed there until 1945, when he was arrested by Soviet intelligence SMERSH and deported to Moscow on July 19, 1945, where he died, according to the official version - from heart failure. On March 15, 2002, President Leonid Kuchma signed a decree posthumously awarding Voloshyn the title of "Hero of Ukraine" with the Order of the State.

== End of confrontation and losses ==
In the evening of March 17 (according to other sources, March 18), the entire territory of Carpatho-Ukraine was occupied by Hungarians. On March 18 (after the capture of Volovets, the last settlement held by the Sich), Hungarian troops ended the occupation of Transcarpathian Ukraine and reached the entire border with the Republic of Poland and the Kingdom of Romania. Organized resistance ceased, but some units of the Carpathian Sich continued to fight in guerrilla units for another three weeks, and in the Volovets and Rakhiv regions until January 1940. In March 1939, the General Staff of the Hungarian Army decided to conduct a series of combat operations to cleanse Carpatho-Ukraine of "foreign elements" and to report on their progress every ten days. "Foreign elements", which included Galicians, were taken to the Hungarian-Polish border, and there were handed over to the Poles for execution. Followers of Miklós Horthy increased the number of troops and gendarmerie in some districts.

On March 18, the commander of the Voliv Sich, Stepan Figura, was shot dead.

The leader of the Khust Sich, Oleksandr Blystiv- "Haidamak", while in the Khust prison, did not have a pencil, so he pierced his finger with a pin and wrote a note with blood: I, Oleksandr Blestiv, 22, from Khust, am going to die for loving my homeland - Ukraine. Combat losses of the parties during the war amounted to:

- "Sich": 430 killed, more than 400 wounded, about 750 prisoners;
- Hungarian Army: 197 killed, 534 wounded. Official Hungarian figures: 72 killed, 163 wounded, 4 missing, 2 captured.

The total losses of the Sich, according to various sources, ranged from 2 to 6.5 thousand people. The difference is explained by the fact that most of them died not in clashes with regular Hungarian units, but as a result of sweeps and executions of prisoners. The local Hungarian population, armed with weapons left by the Czechoslovaks, also contributed to this: they began to hunt down Sich groups and kill them on the spot.

In addition, Sich soldiers who surrendered to the Poles were shot on the spot, and natives of Eastern Galicia (part of the Polish Republic at the time), who were detained by the Hungarian occupiers in Transcarpathia, were handed over to the Polish border service. Part of the Carpathian Sich fighters, who had retreated to the Kingdom of Romania, were disarmed, looted by the local population and handed over to the Hungarians. The Sich survivors were held in a Hungarian concentration camp in the village of Voryulyuposh near the town of Nyíregyháza. During the 5-day invasion of Transcarpathia, over 27,000 Ukrainian civilians were killed. In the first two months after the occupation, 59,377 people from Transcarpathia were deported to work in the Kingdom of Hungary, and 686 people were deported to Germany.

== Memory and awards ==
The Carpathian Sich Cross was issued in 1969 by the Central Board of the Carpathian Sich Brotherhood for all soldiers of the Carpathian Sich. Silver cross.

In 2009, the National Bank of Ukraine issued commemorative coins dedicated to the 70th anniversary of the proclamation of Carpatho-Ukraine: a ₴2 nickel silver coin and a ₴20 silver coin.

== See also ==
- Carpathian Sich
- Carpatho-Ukraine
- Soviet annexation of Eastern Galicia and Volhynia
- Soviet annexation of Transcarpathia
- Hungarian irredentism
- Magyaron
