= Rusyns and Ukrainians in Czechoslovakia (1918–1938) =

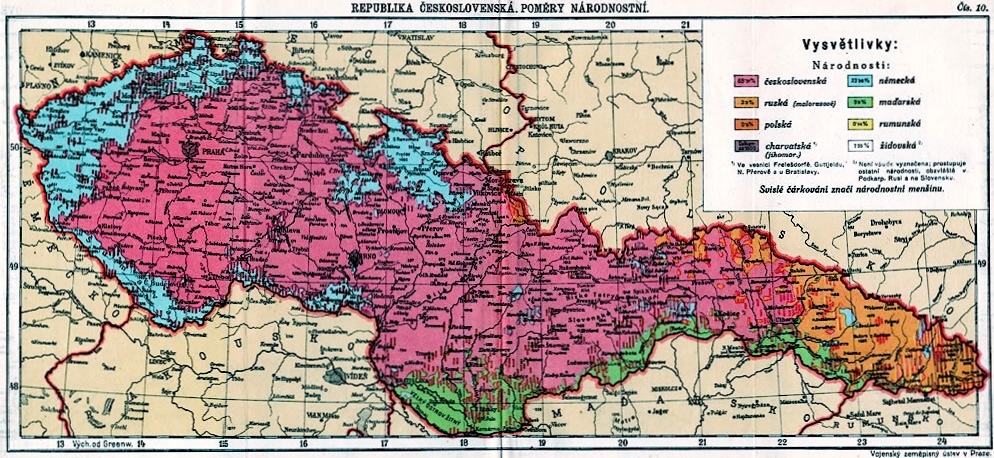
Ethnic map of Czechoslovakia in 1931

Rusyns and Ukrainians in Czechoslovakia during the period from 1918 to 1938, were ethnic Rusyns and Ukrainians of the First Czechoslovak Republic, representing the two main ethnic communities in the most eastern region of Czechoslovakia, known during that period as the Subcarpathian Rus.

== History ==
The region of Subcarpathian Rus was the economically poorest region of Czechoslovakia. In 1914, the region was referred to by one historian as "little more than a Magyar deer park". Its people were wretchedly poor, having for centuries supplemented the meagre living the mountainous area afforded with seasonal agricultural labor and service in the Hungarian infantry.

Subcarpathian Rus was a hotbed of secessionist sentiment throughout the inter-war period. These were manifested by strong cultural and linguistic links with the Ukrainians, in the Soviet Union and interwar Poland. There were also calls for Ukrainian autonomy within the Czechoslovak Republic, and calls for the formation of a Lemko-Rusyn Republic on the northern side of the Carpathians, attempted to unite with this faction.

During World War I, Rusyn leaders had reached an agreement with Tomáš Garrigue Masaryk to secure autonomy to Subcarpathian region within a future Czechoslovak state. The agreement received international sanction in the 1919 Treaty of Saint-Germain. The Paris Peace Conference had also stipulated earlier that year that Subcarpathian Rus be granted full autonomy and promised the territory a diet having legislative power in all matters of local administration. However, the constitution of 1920 limited the provision on autonomy, making reference to the requirements of the unity of the state. All legislation of Subcarpathian Rus was made subject to approval by the president of the republic, and the governor of Subcarpathian Rus was to be nominated by the president. As a result, even the constitutional provision for regional autonomy was never implemented; the regional diet of Subcarpathian Rus was never convened. The issue of autonomy became a major source of discontent. Other grievances included the placement of the western boundary—which left 150,000 Rusyns in Slovakia—and the large numbers of Czechs brought to Subcarpathian Rus as administrators and educators. Political life in Subcarpathian Rus was characterized by a proliferation of political parties and a diversity of cultural tendencies. All Czechoslovak political parties were represented, and a number of indigenous parties emerged as well. Of particular significance were the Ukrainophiles, Russophiles, Hungarians, and communists.

== Political movements ==
Ukrainophile and Russophile tendencies were strengthened by the large influx of émigrés following the war.

The Ukrainophiles were largely members of the Eastern Catholic Churches and espoused autonomy within Czechoslovakia. Some favored union with Soviet Ukraine. The Ukrainophiles were represented by the local Social Democrats and the National Christian Party led by Avgustyn Voloshyn. They were seen as more friendly towards the government.

The Russophile part of the population was largely Eastern Orthodox and also espoused regional autonomy. They were organized politically in the Carpatho-Russian Labour Party of Small Peasants and Landless (KTP), led by Andrey Gagatko; the Agricultural Federation (AZS), led by Andrej Brody; and the fascist-style Fencik Party. The Czechoslovak National Democracy was generally supportive of the Russophile movement, specifically the Russian National Party (RNP) and later the Russian National Bloc. In the 1929 election, the Russian National Bloc consisted of the RNP, AZS, KTP and the Russian National Union of Vasil Fedak. In the 1935 election, the "Russian Bloc" consisted of RNP and the Fencik Party.

Hungarians populated a compact area in southern parts of Subcarpathian Rus. They were represented by the Unified Magyar Party, which consistently received ten percent of the vote in the region and was in permanent opposition to the government.

The communists, strong in the poor province, attempted to appeal to the Ukrainian element by espousing union with Soviet Ukraine. In 1935 the communists polled 25 percent of the vote in Subcarpathian Rus. The elections of 1935 gave only 37 percent of the Rusyn vote to political parties supporting the Czechoslovak government. The communists, Unified Magyars, and autonomist groups polled 63 percent.

Results of parliamentary elections in Subcarpathian Rus'
Parties		1924	1925	1929	1935
	Communist	39.4%	30.8%	15.2%	25.6%
Russophiles	AZS	8.3%	11.7%	18.3%	14.9%
Russophiles	KTP	7.9%	6.3%	18.3%	3.6%
Russophiles	RNP	1.1%	1.3%	18.3%	9.3%
Hungarians	MNP	11.1%	11.8%	11.4%	11%
Hungarians	Others	2.3%	0.4%	–	–
Ukrainophiles	RKhP	4.4%	3%	3.4%	2.4%
Ukrainophiles	SDRPnPR	8.3%	7.4%	8.6%	9.6%
Jewish	ŽS	7.1%	7.8%	6.3%	9.6%
Jewish	ŽKS	3.9%	4.8%	29.1%	19.6%
Czechoslovaks	RSZML	5.9%	13.9%	29.1%	19.6%
Czechoslovaks	Others	0.5%	–	2.8%	2.8%

== See also ==
- Eparchy of Mukačevo and Prešov
- Greek Catholic Eparchy of Mukachevo

== Sources ==
- Bosl, Karl, ed. (1979). Die Erste Tschechoslowakische Republik als multinationaler Parteienstaat, (in German). Munich/Vienna: R. Oldenbourg Verlag. ISBN 3-486-49181-4.
- Línová, Sabina (2019). Politika a náboženství Podkarpatské Rusi v letech 1919–1929 (PDF). pp. 48, 53.
- Pekar, Athanasius B. (1979). The Bishops of the Eparchy of Mukachevo, with Historical Outlines. Pittsburgh: Byzantine Seminary Pres.
- Statistical Office of the Czechoslovak Republic (1936). Elections à la Chambre des Députés faites en mai 1935 (in Czech).
- Unger, Rosalyn (1982). "Historical Setting: Subcarpathian Ruthenia". Czechoslovakia, a Country Study. p. 38. Archived from the original on 24 January 2024.
