= Stefan Fentsik =

Stephan Fencik
- Стефан Фенцик
- Born: 13 November 1892; Velyki Luchky, Kingdom of Hungary, Austria-Hungary
- Died: 30 March 1946 (aged 53); Uzhhorod, Ukrainian SSR, Soviet Union
- Cause of death: Execution
- Political party: Russian National Autonomous Party
- Other political affiliations: Russian National Party
- Movement: Rusyn Autonomism, Galician Russophilia, Magyaron

Stefan Fentsyk also romanized as Stepan Fentsik (Rusyn: Стефан Фенцик) was a Rusyn priest, pedagogue, musical director, publicist, cultural activist, and Fascist politician. After his education, he acted as a Rusyn autonomous politician within both Czechoslovakia and the Kingdom of Hungary. He was executed by the Soviet Union for his refusal to cooperate with them on 30 March 1946.

== Early life and career ==
Fentsyk was born in the village of Velyki Luchky in Austria-Hungary. To a Greek Catholic priest Andriy Fentsyk and Yuliana Legeza. He was a cousin of Yevhen Fentsyk, a notable Rusyn a priest, poet, prose writer and publicist, and Irenei Legeza, a priest, writer and public figure. He first studied at a parish school in Velyka Toronia later attending two gymnasiums in Uzhhorod and Berehovo. After words he went on to study theology and philosophy at the University of Budapest (1910-1914, PhD., 1918) and the University of Vienna (1914-1916, Th.D., 1916). He also studied French and law in Paris, music at The University of Music in Vienna and Franz List Academy of Music (1918), and finally law at the Academy in Sarospatak (1918) and at the University of Debrecen (1922). While also being ordained as a Greek Catholic priest in 1918.

From 1916 to 1926 he began work in pedagogy in Uzhhorod at a Gymnasium, a Seminary, and a college. At this time, he worked for several musical groups in the region and published a two-part collection of Rusyn songs called Pisny podkarpatskykh rusynov.

== Czechoslovak era ==
In 1918 during the dissolution of Austria-Hungary Fentsyk was a member of the Uzhhorod National Council, which worked to have Subcarpathian Ruthenia annexed into Czechoslovakia and during an overnight train ride to Prague he wrote the lyrics to the Rusyn National Anthem "Subcarpathian Rusyns, Arise from Your Deep Slumber" and first published it in 1922.

After the creation of Czechoslovakia Fentsik became a leader of the Rusyn Russophilic movement, he was a founder and longtime secretary of the Russophilic Dukhnovych Society and was a leader within the Russian National Party. He served as chairman of a coalition of cultural organizations during the 1920's, the Subcarpathian Rusyn Popular Enlightenment Union, and as founding head and leader from 1930 to 1944 of the Dukhnovych Russian Scout movement, a Russophilic fascist youth movement, which he represented at numerous meetings of Russophilic and other international organizations throughout Europe. He published accounts of his international visits, both including an extended one among Rusyn immigrants in the United States (1934–1935) described in the book Uzhgorod-Amerika (1936). In 1931 he unsuccessfully tried to become the bishop of the Greek Catholic Eparchy of Mukachevo. In 1934 while visiting the US he was defrocked by the new bishop for "for the following reasons: 1. refusal of canonical obedience; 2. suspicion of schism; 3. a state of life unworthy of a priest".

By 1934 Fentsyk had become very involved in regional politics and maintained his long-standing opposition to Czechoslovakia which he argued had failed to give the various minorities of the country enough autonomy. During a trip to the United States Fentsyk was accused of anti-state activities by Czechoslovak authorities and when he returned to Czechoslovakia, he was arrested. In 1935 he founded the Russian National Autonomous Party, a fascist party which argued that the Rusyns where part of a Greater Russia alongside the Ukrainians and Russians. But in the 1935 Czechoslovak parliamentary election he was elected to serve as a deputy of the Russian National Autonomous Party and so was released. Fentsyk had come to be impressed by Italian Fascism and tried to found a "Carpatho-Russian Party" which he would be the "Supreme Leader" of but this amounted to nothing. All while he continued to publish newspapers arguing for an autonomous Caratho-Ukraine. During the 1937 Congress of the Subcarpathian Ruthenians, an ultimatum was adopted which demanded autonomy for the region within 60 days. Milan Hodža, the Czechoslovak prime minister has given the ultimatum by Fentsyk. During this era he was covertly supported by Poland, which sought to weaken their Czechoslovak enemies.

During the collapse of Czechoslovakia in 1938 a group of Rusyn separatist parliamentarians and Rusyn American representatives including Fentsyk negotiated with the Czechoslovak government for the formation of an autonomous Ruthenian government called the National Council of Subcarpathian Rus’. Following this agreement Fentsyk reached another agreement with the most powerful Rusyn autonomous leader Andriy Brody that he would serve within Brody's government as Minister of Economic Affairs. With his job being to determine the border between Slovakia and Carpatho-Ukraine. In this role Fentsyk pushed for a revanchist position and wanted Slovakia to cede the Presov Region to Carpatho-Ukraine due to its majority Rusyn population, all this accomplished was worsening relations between the two. Starting February of that same year, he began to form fascist paramilitary groups known as the Blackshirts in Berehove, Mukachevo and Radvanka.

Additionally, Fentsyk and Brody began loudly a frequently complaining about what they claimed was an overabundance of Czech school teachers and loudly calling for all Rusyns "from Poprad to the Tisza" to unify into "a unitary, free state". The Czechoslovak government could have been overlooked these provocations, but the government appeared to be working towards a referendum to annex both Subcarpathian Ruthenia and the Presov Region into Hungary, which was not something the Czechoslovak government could accept with the ongoing negotiations for the Munich Agreement.

== Hungarian collaboration ==
On October 26, 1938, Fentsyk and Brody were revealed by the Czechoslovaks of serving as paid agents of the Hungarian government and to avoid prosecution Fentsyk fled to Hungary via the Polish embassy and became a member of the Hungarian House of Representatives.The Hungarian government tasked him with organizing the Black Shirts. Based in the southern, Hungarian majority parts of Subcarpathian Rus' annexed by Hungary in the First Vienna Award, the Black Shirts entered what remained of Carpatho-Ukraine in order to dedestabalize the region politically as well as fighting alongside the Hungarians in their Invasion of Carpatho-Ukraine as part of a larger Hungarian hybrid war against Carpatho-Ukraine. After the Hungarian Invasion of Carpatho-Ukraine Fentsyk was appointed as a member of the House of Magnates and served from 1939-1944, as part of a larger Hungarian alliance with the Magyarons and Russophiles.

Fentsyk and the other Russophiles expected that the Hungarians would give Subcarpathian Ruthenia a significant degree of autonomy, but the Hungarians actually reduced the regions autonomy compared to the Czechoslovaks and Fentsyk and the other Ruthenian Nationalists in the Hungarian government held effectively zero power. This was because the Hungarian government did not fully trust the Russophiles and especially did not trust Fentsyk due to his ties to Russian Fascists and Greater Russian nationalism. He still advocated for autonomy for Subcarpathian Ruthenia, but he failed to achieve any results. In 1939, like other defrocked priests who collaborated with the Hungarians, Fentsyk was returned to his position as a Priest.

On New Years of 1939 Fentsyk made a visit to Hungarian Prime Minister Béla Imrédy, accompanied by various Magyaron officials. During this visit he said "[the Magyarons] represent 90% of the interests and desires of the people [of Carpatho-Ukraine]...The Transcarpathian people not only pay attention to, but also proclaim the idea [of Magyaron]".

== Soviet collaboration and death ==
When the Soviet Army liberated Carpathian Ruthenia, Fentsyk declined to flee and initially served as a translator at the Soviet headquarters. This arrangement ended when the Soviets believed they could work with Fentsyk to convince the Mukachevo Greek Catholic Diocese to switch from allegiance with Rome to allegiance with Moscow. Believing his ambition and desire to be a leading regional figure made him a good candidate for a new, cooperative, local priest to replace the old one. He flatly refused this offer and was arrested by the Soviet intelligence agency SMERSH on 31 March 1945, despite various attempts to get him to agree he continually refused even under torture. He was tried by a "people's court" and was executed on 30 March 1946 and buried in a cemetery in Uzhhorod.

After the fall of the Soviet Union, he was rehabilitated by a Ukrainian Court on 24 February 1992.
