= Galician Russophilia =

19th–20th-century political movement among Ukrainians and Rusyns in Galicia

Galician Russophilia (Ukrainian: русофільство, romanized: rusofil'stvo), also known in Poland and Ukraine as Moscophilia (Ukrainian: москвофільство, moskvofil'stvo) was a cultural and political movement in modern-day western Ukraine, which emerged during the 19th century. First becoming popular in the region of Carpathian Ruthenia (then part of the Kingdom of Hungary), it later spread to Galicia and Bukovina, both ruled by Austria-Hungary. Its ideology emphasized that since the Eastern Slavic people of Galicia were descendants of the people of Kievan Rus' (Ruthenians), and followers of Eastern Christianity, they were thus a branch of the Russian people. The movement was part of the larger Pan-Slavism that was developing in the late 19th century. Russophilia was largely a backlash against Polonisation (in Galicia), Romanianization (in Bukovina) and Magyarisation (in Carpathian Ruthenia) that was largely blamed on the landlords and associated with Roman Catholicism.

Russophilia has survived longer among the Rusyn minority, especially that in Carpathian Ruthenia, and the Lemkos of south-east Poland.

== Terminology ==
The Russophiles did not always apply the term to themselves and identified as "Russians", "Rusians", "Ruthenians" or "Rusyny" ("Rusyns"). Some of them used self-descriptions such as "Obshcherossy" ("Common Russians"), "Starorusyny" ("Old Ruthenians") or "Tverdorusyny" ("Hard Ruthenians") in order to stress their cultural and political orientation on Russia, and opposed themselves to supporters of a distinct Ukrainian identity, whom they derogatorily called "Ukrainophiles" or "khakhly". Ukrainian national circles (Ukrainian: народовці, literally "populists") in their turn called their Russophile opponents "Moscophiles" (from the name of Moscow) or "katsaps".

== Background ==
After the fall of the westernmost East Slavic state in 1349, most of the area of what is now Western Ukraine came under the control of Poland and Hungary, with Poland ruling Galicia and Hungary controlling Carpathian Ruthenia. The loss of independence began a period of gradual, centuries-long assimilation of much of the native elite into Polish and Hungarian culture. This elite adopted a national orientation in which they saw the native Rus population of Galicia as a branch of the Polish nation who happened to be of the Eastern Christian faith. They believed that the native language was merely a dialect of Polish, comparable to Mazovian, and that assimilation would be inevitable.

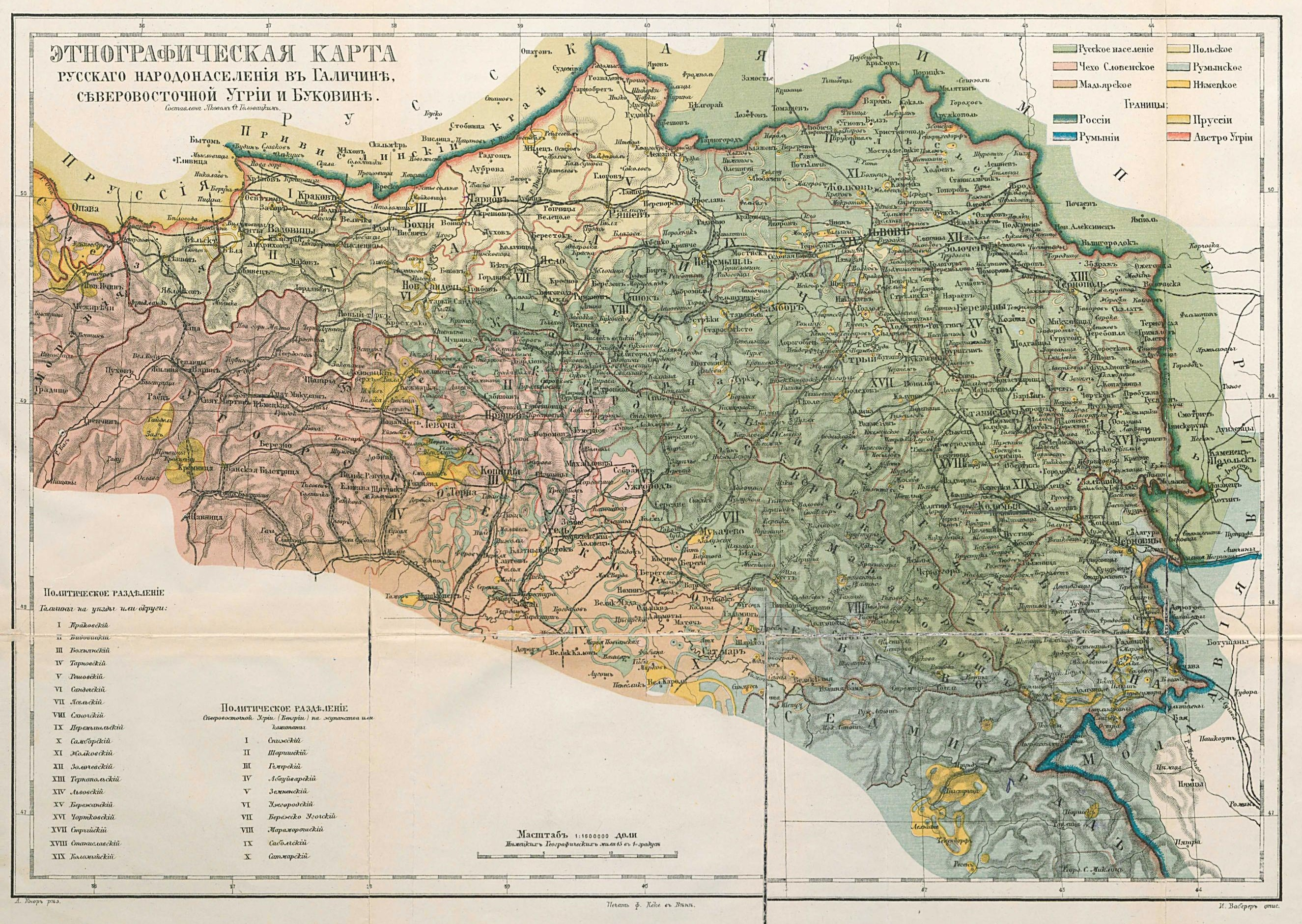
An 1878 Russian ethnographic map of Carpathian Ruthenia, Galicia and Bukovina, marking Ruthenians (green) as "Russians"

This process of Polonisation was, however, resented by the peasants, the clergy, and small minority of nobles who retained their East Slavic culture, religion or both. The latter two groups would form the nucleus of native national movements that would emerge with the loosening of Polish and Hungarian control in western Ukraine, which occurred when the entire region came under the control of the Austrian Habsburgs in the course of the Partitions of Poland. The Austrian Emperor emancipated the serfs, introduced compulsory education and raised the status of the Ruthenian priests to that of their Polish and Hungarian counterparts. Furthermore, they mandated that Ukrainian Catholic seminarians receive a formal higher education (previously, priests had been educated informally by their fathers), and organized institutions in Vienna and Lviv that would serve this function. This led to the appearance, for the first time, of a large educated social class within the Ukrainian population in Galicia. Austrian reforms led to a gradual social mobilization of the native inhabitants of Western Ukraine and the emergence of several national ideologies that reflected the natives' East Slavic culture and were opposed to that of Roman Catholic Poland and Hungary. This development was encouraged by the Austrian authorities because it served to undermine Polish or Hungarian control of the area. The cultural movements included: Russophilia, the idea that Galicia was the westernmost part of Russia and that the natives of Western Ukraine were, like all of the Russian Empire's East Slavic inhabitants, members of one Russian nation; Ruthenianism, the idea that the people of Western Ukraine were a unique East Slavic nation; and Ukrainophilia, the idea that the people of western Ukraine were the same as those of neighbouring lands in the Russian Empire but that both were a people different from Russians, known as Ukrainians (the name "Ukrainians" itself began to be accepted by Ruthenian Galicians around the 1890s, under the influence of Mykola Kostomarov and the Brotherhood of Saints Cyril and Methodius in central Ukraine).

Initially, there existed a fluidity between all three national orientations, with people changing their allegiance throughout their lives, and until approximately the turn of the 20th century members of all three groups frequently identified themselves by the ethnonym Ruthenians (Rusyny). Initially, the most prominent ideology was Ruthenianism, or Rutenstvo. Its proponents, referred to as "Old Ruthenians", were mainly wealthier or more influential priests and the remnants of the nobility who had not been Polonised, and were quite loyal to the Habsburgs, to whom they owed their higher social standing. While emphasizing their separateness from the Poles in terms of religion and background, these people nevertheless maintained an elitist attitude towards the peasantry. They frequently spoke the Polish language among themselves, and tried to promote a version of Church Slavonic with elements of the local Ukrainian vernacular as well as the Russian language as a literary language for western Ukraine. This language was never standardized, however. The language actually spoken by the common people was viewed with contempt. Old Ruthenians rejected both Ukrainophilism and Russophilism. The Ukrainian thinker Mykhailo Drahomanov wrote ironically of them, that "you Galician intellectuals really do think of creating some kind of Uniate Paraguay, with some kind of hierarchical bureaucratic aristocracy, just like you have created an Austro-Ruthenian literary language!" Old Ruthenianism dominated Galicia's cultural scene until the mid-19th century, when it was supplanted by Russophilia; many of the proponents of old Ruthenianism eventually became Russophiles.

== Ideology ==
The time has come . . . to cross our Rubicon and say openly so that everyone can hear it: We cannot be separated by a Chinese wall from our brothers and cannot stand apart from the linguistic, ecclesiastical, and national connection with the entire Russian world!

From Ivan Naumovich's Glimpse into the future, considered the most important manifesto of Galician Russophilism

The early Galician Russophile Nikolay Kmicykevich wrote an article in 1834 stating that the Russians were the same people from Western Ukraine to Kamchatka, from the White Sea to the Black Sea, and the language they spoke was the same Russian language. He wrote that the standard Russian language was more acceptable for modern writing and that the popular dialects in Ukraine were corrupted by Polish influence. These ideas were stimulated by the Russian pan-Slavist Mikhail Pogodin, who stayed in Lviv (called then Lemberg) in 1835 and 1839–1840 and who during this time influenced the local Ruthenian intelligentsia. No longer seeing themselves as representatives of a small Ruthenian nation of under three million people, weak in comparison to its neighbours, the Russophiles now saw themselves as the westernmost branch of the Great Russian people. A Russian orientation also played into the Russophile's elitist tendencies, because the Russian literary language which they tried to adopt (many continued to use the Polish language in their daily lives) set the Russophile priests and nobles apart from the Ukrainian-speaking peasants. Politically, the Russophiles came to advocate the idea of a union between a Galician Ruthenia and Russia.

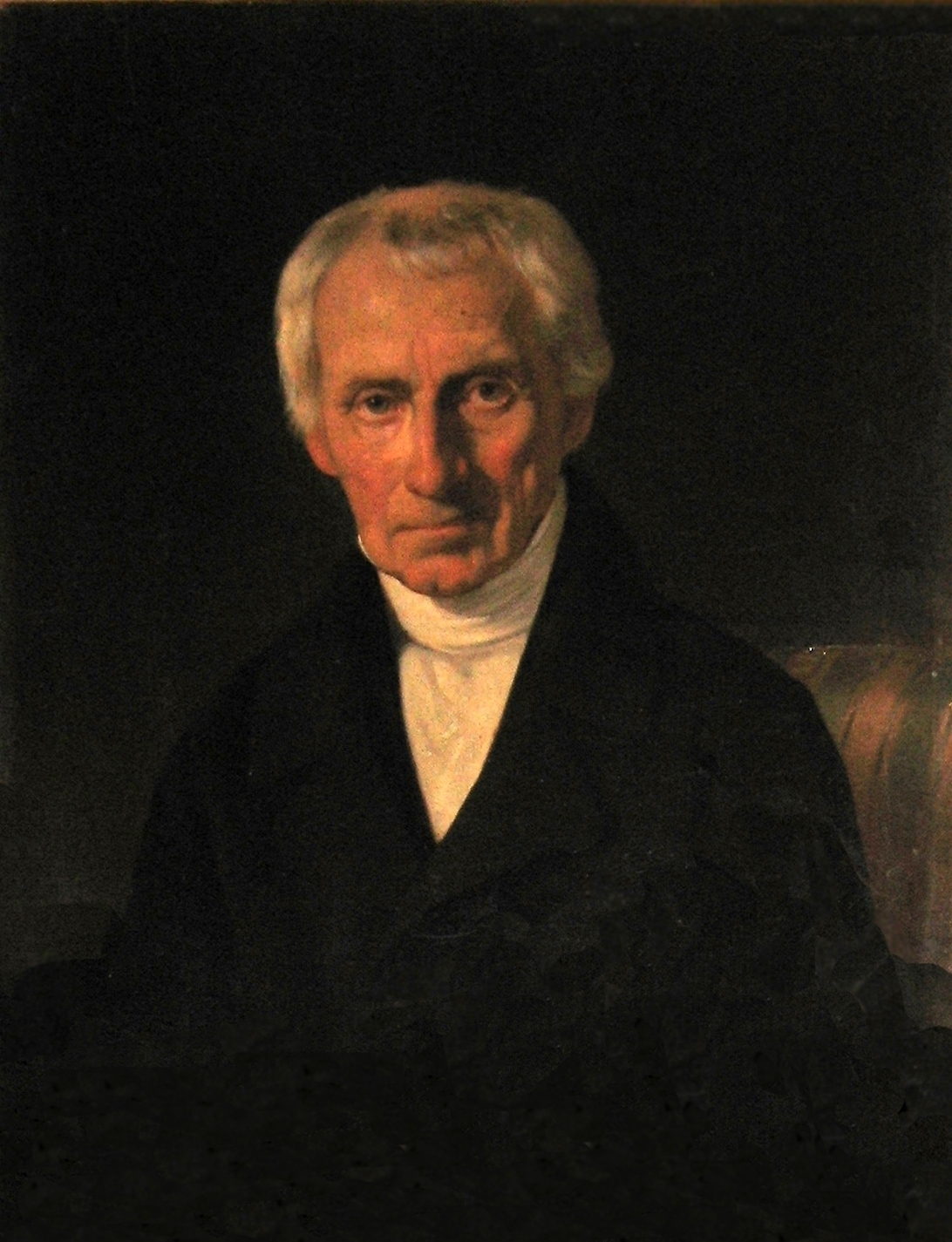
A portrait of Denys Zubrytsky by Alojzy Rejchan

Russophilia increased its popularity in Galicia following the Revolutions of 1848, as the Austrian government de facto transferred administrative power of the region to Polish nobility, ignoring demands of the Supreme Ruthenian Council. As a result, many members of that organ, including conservative members of the clergy, adopted a pro-Russian orientation, at the same time underlining their loyalty to the Austrian monarchy. One of the most active Galician Russophiles was the prominent historian, nobleman Denys Zubrytsky, who helped convert many members of the Galician elite to his cause. He was also the first to begin writing in standard Russian: as early as 1849 he started his main work, The History of the Ancient Galician-Russian Principality. In a letter to his friend Mikhail Pogodin, Zubrytsky claimed that his stated purpose was to acquaint his Galician people with Russian history and the Russian language. Indeed, the historiography of the medieval Kingdom of Galicia–Volhynia was largely begun by Galician Russophiles and served as the basis for their nation-building project (in contrast, the Ukrainophiles at that time focused on the history of the Cossacks). In terms of literature and culture, the Russophiles promoted Nikolai Gogol and Ivan Naumovich in contrast to Ukrainophile emphasis on Taras Shevchenko.

In terms of language, Galician Russophiles were strongly opposed to the adoption of the vernacular Ukrainian language spoken by peasants and instead supported the adoption of standard literary Russian. This opposition was such that they even welcomed the ban on the Ukrainian language in the Russian Empire in 1876. Reflecting their belief that the people of Ukraine played a special role in the greater Russian nation, the leading Russophile thinker Ivan Naumovich declared that the Russian language was derived from "Little Russian" and was only being readopted in Galicia. Indeed, Galician Russophiles wrote that one of the reasons for all East Slavs to adopt the Russian language was that the modern Russian language had been created in the 17th and 18th centuries by scholars from Ukraine.

Despite some democratic elements (such as promoting literacy among peasants) Galician Russophilia tended to be anti-democratic and reactionary, placing it at odds with the democratic trends in 19th-century society. For example, the Russophile leader Denis Zubrytsky defended serfdom both before and after the emancipation of Austrian Galician serfs in 1848.

There were also antisemitic strains in Russophilism. From the 1860s to the 1880s some peasants hoped that the Tsar would come to Galicia and slaughter the Poles and the Jews. During the Russian occupation of Galicia in 1914–1915, a Galician Russophile newspaper spread rumours of anti-Russian Jewish uprisings in order to justify antisemitic pogroms by Russian troops, and Russophiles working within the Russian administration united with right-wing Russian elements in urging the Russian government to solve the "Jewish question" by stripping Jews of Russian citizenship, expelling them to Germany and distributing their property (along with that of Poles) among the local Ukrainian (who Moscophiles considered "Russian") people. The latter appeals were ignored by the Russian military, who did not want excessive disruptions to the local economy during the war. Russophiles who had been installed by the Russian authorities as mayors in some towns proceeded to shut down Jewish schools.

== Rise and development ==
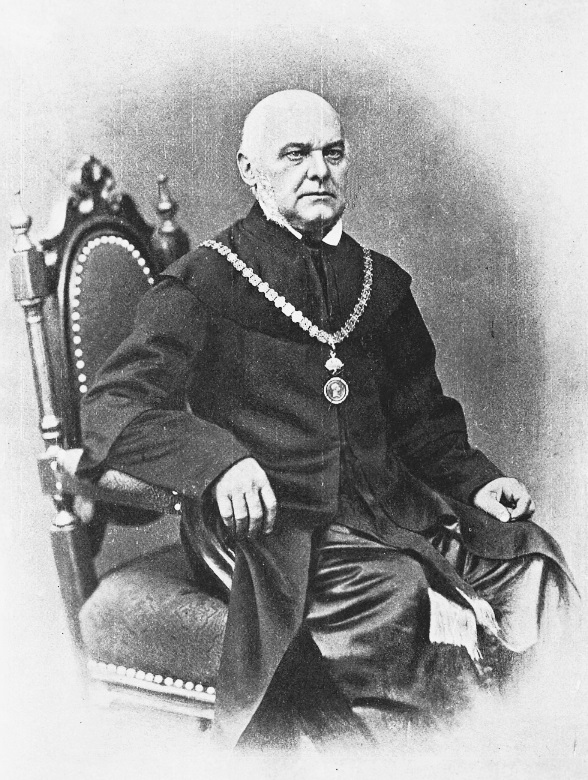
Yakiv Holovatsky, a prominent Russophile, as a professor at the Lviv University, 1864

Western Ukrainian Russophilia appeared in Carpathian Ruthenia at the end of the 18th century. At this time, several people from the region settled in Saint Petersburg, Russia, and obtained high academic positions. The best known of these was Vasilly Kukolnik (father of Russian playwright Nestor Kukolnik), a member of an old noble family who had studied in Vienna before coming to Russia. Vasilly's pupils included Grand Duke Constantine Pavlovich of Russia and Grand Duke Nikolai Pavlovich of Russia, the future Emperor Nicholas I of Russia. These émigrés, while adopting a sense of Russian patriotism, also maintained their ties to their homeland and tried to use their wealth to introduce Russian literature and culture to their region. When the Hungarians revolted against the Austrians in 1848, the local East Slavs, antagonistic toward the Hungarians who had dominated them, were deeply moved by the presence of the seemingly invincible Russian troops sent by Nicholas to help crush the rebellion. At this time, Austria supported the Russophile movement as a counterbalance to Polish and Hungarian interests, and under the leadership of the Russophile nobleman Adolf Dobriansky, the people of Carpathian Ruthenia were granted limited autonomy, although the region reverted to Hungarian control after a few years.

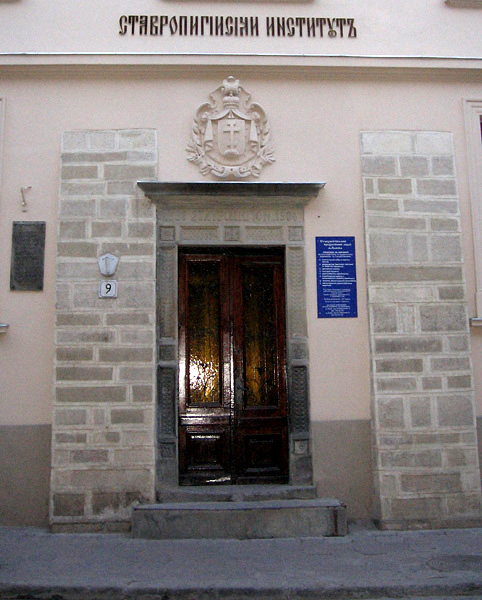
Historical building of the Stauropegion Institute in Lviv

In Galicia, Russophilia emerged as early as the 1830s, when "Society of scholars" was organized in Przemyśl and was stimulated in part by the presence in Lviv in 1835 and from 1839 to 1840 of Russian pan-Slavist Mikhail Pogodin who became acquainted with the local Ruthenian intelligentsia and became an influence on them. However, the movement did not come to dominate western Ukrainian society until the 1850s–60s. Many proponents of Ruthenianism became disenchanted with Austria and linked themselves with the giant and powerful Russian state. The relative rise of Russia's power in comparison to that of Austria during the 19th century also played a role in such feelings. Events of the 1860s helped to increase pro-Russian feelings in Galicia. Traditionally, the local Ruthenians had a naive belief that the Habsburg Emperor was on their side and that he would defend them against the Polish nobility. From the late 1850s, Austrian courts often sided with (primarily Polish) nobles in land disputes with peasants, during which forests and pastures that the peasants had traditionally been using were deemed the property of the nobles. This led to significant economic hardship for the peasants. While this was happening, the Russian tsar had emancipated the peasants in Russian-ruled Ukraine. In 1863–1864, an insurrection of Polish nobles in areas that included Russian-ruled Ukraine was brutally crushed by the Tsarist government, which in punishing the Polish rebels provided the Ukrainian peasants with relatively favorable compensation. Many Galicians began to approvingly contrast the Tsar's brutal treatment of the Polish nobles with the Austrians' seemingly taking the Polish side in the Polish-Ukrainian conflict. Many of them came to believe that the plight of the Ukrainians was improving more under the Tsars than it was under the Austrians. In the testimony of one Austrian-Ukrainian peasant, "if there is no justice in Vienna, we will find it in the Moskal."

During this time, the poet and scholar Yakiv Holovatsky, a member of the "Ruthenian Trinity", joined the Russophile movement. Soon thereafter, the Russophile priests of the St George Cathedral Circle came to dominate the local hierarchy of the Greek Catholic Church, thereby transforming that Church into an instrument of their cause. Russophiles took over Ruthenian academic institutions (such as the Stauropegion Institute, with its printing press and large collection of archives) and the venerable Ruthenian newspaper Slovo ('The Word'), and under their leadership, it became the most widely circulated newspaper among Western Ukrainians. In 1870, the Russophiles formed a political organization, the Ruthenian Council (Ruska Rada) which represented the population of Western Ukraine. From the 1860s until the 1880s Western Ukrainian political, religious, and cultural life came to be dominated by the Russophiles.

== Pre-war decline and fall ==
Within a generation of achieving dominance of Western Ukrainian life, however, the Russophiles were eclipsed by the Ukrainophiles, or so-called Populists (Narodovtsi). Originally coming from the same social stratum as the Russophiles (priests and nobles), but joined by the emerging secular intelligentsia, the Ukrainophiles were from a younger generation who unlike their fathers found enthusiasm for Taras Shevchenko rather than the Tsars, and embraced the peasantry rather than rejected it. This dedication to the people (the "bottom-up" approach) would prove successful against the Russophiles' elitist "top-down" orientation.

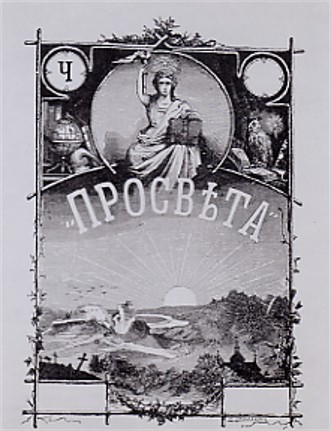
Early publication of the Ukrainophile Prosvita society

Many factors accounted for the collapse of the Russophile movement. The principal one was likely the Ukrainophiles' incredible capacity for organization. The Populists fanned out throughout the countryside in order to mobilize the masses to their cause. In 1868, the Lviv student Anatole Vakhnianyn organized and became the first head of the Prosvita organization, whose goal was to organize reading rooms and community theatres which became extremely popular among the peasants. In order to help the impoverished peasants, Ukrainophile activists set up co-operatives that would buy supplies in large quantities, eliminate middlemen, and pass the savings onto the villagers. Credit unions were created, providing inexpensive loans to farmers and eliminating the reliance on non-Ukrainian moneylenders. Russophiles belatedly tried to imitate such strategies but could not catch up. By 1914, Prosvita had 3,000 reading rooms while the Russophile version, the Kachkovsky Society (founded in 1874), had only 300. The Ukrainian co-operative union had 900 members, while the rival Russophile one had only 106. Prevented from publishing in the mainstream western Ukrainian newspapers by the Russophiles who controlled them, the Populists created their own. In 1880, Dilo ('Deed') was founded as a rival to the Russophile Slovo ("Word"), and due to the rising literacy of the Ukrainian population, its circulation surpassed that of its older rival.

A second important factor for the success of the Ukrainophiles was the exile from Dnieper Ukraine of a large number of well-educated and talented eastern Ukrainian writers and scholars, such as the writer Panteleimon Kulish, the former professor of Kiev's University of St. Vladimir, economist and philosopher Mykhailo Drahomanov, and especially the historian Mykhailo Hrushevsky, who headed a newly established department at the University of Lviv. Many of these figures settled or lived for a time in Lviv. In contrast, no prominent Russian intellectuals came to Galicia in order to help the local Russophile cause. This phenomenon led to the ironic observation of Drahomanov that the Ukrainophiles were actually more in touch with contemporary Russian cultural and intellectual trends than were the Russophiles despite the latter group's love for Russia. Moreover, while educated Ukrainophiles were coming to Galicia from the Russian Empire, local Russophiles in Galicia experienced a "brain drain" as many of them left western Ukraine for positions in Russia. Many of the classics teachers needed as a result of Russian educational reforms promoted by Dmitry Tolstoy in the 19th century were Galicians. From among the local intelligentsia, Ivan Franko showed the literary potential of the vernacular Ukrainian language. The local declining number of Russophiles could not compete with the talent of these Ukrainophile cultural figures and scholars. Possibly as a result of the Polish-Ruthenian agreement of 1890 which allowed Ukrainian culture and education in Galicia, Ukrainian language students rose sharply in number. Hrushevsky envisioned Galicia as a refuge for the Ukrainian national movement and the Galician Ruthenians as Ukrainians of the 20th century. The 1890 agreement was crucial in helping Ukrainian national identity flourish in Galicia earlier than it did in the Russian Empire's territories where it was suppressed.

Other factors helped Ukrainophilia triumph over Russophilia in Galicia: the Polish-dominated high society of Galicia was deeply anti-Russian in response to the Russian suppression of Polish uprisings, hence, the Galician Polish gentry set an anti-Russian tone for polite society while remaining sympathetic to the Ukrainophile movement.

1898 edition of Taras Shevchenko's Kobzar published by Shevchenko Scientific Society in Lviv

Help for the Ukrainophile cause from eastern Ukraine also took the form of generous financial assistance from wealthy Ukrainian landowners. Due to restrictions against Ukrainian printing and the Ukrainian language imposed by the tsarist government in eastern Ukraine, eastern Ukrainian noble or Cossacks officer families who had not become Russified sent money to Galicia in order to sponsor Ukrainophile cultural activities there. These people, enjoying gentry status, were generally much wealthier than the priests and priests' sons who dominated the local Galician movements. The amount sent by these private individuals from Russian-ruled Ukraine to Ukrainophile causes likely equalled the subsidies sent by the Russian government to Galician Russophiles. For example, Yelyzaveta Myloradovich, a noblewoman from Poltava, donated 20,000 Austrian crowns to the Shevchenko Scientific Society.

The Austrian government also contributed significantly to the Ukrainophiles' victory. Initially, Austria had supported Russophilia as a counterbalance to the Poles and Hungarians. During the latter part of the 19th century, as Austria-Hungary and Russia became rivals, the Austrian authorities became alarmed by the Russophiles' activities. To maintain the loyalty of the Ukrainian population, the Austrian authorities made concessions to Ukrainian causes, such as expanding the Ukrainian educational system, and in 1893 made the Ukrainophile version of the vernacular Ukrainian language the language of instruction. Doing so effectively shut the Russophiles out of the educational system. During the 1880s the Austrians put many Russophiles on trial for treason or espionage. These trials were widely publicized, and served to discredit the Russophiles among the Ukrainian people, most of whom continued to be loyal to the Austrian Emperor. One of the prosecutors was Kost Levytsky, who later became an important Ukrainian politician. The Austrians also deported an editor of the Russophile newspaper Slovo and deposed the Russophile head of the Greek Catholic Church, Metropolitan Joseph Sembratovych.

In 1899, Count Andrey Sheptytsky became new head of the Greek Catholic Church. A Polonised nobleman from an old Ukrainian family, he adopted the Ukrainian language and a Ukrainophile orientation. Although Sheptytsky did not interfere in priests' personal activities and writings, he slowly purged the Church's hierarchy of Russophiles. Despite drawing some Ukrainophiles' criticism for the slow progression of his changes, under Sheptytsky's leadership the Church gradually ceased being a bastion of Russophilism and instead became a staunchly Ukrainophile one.

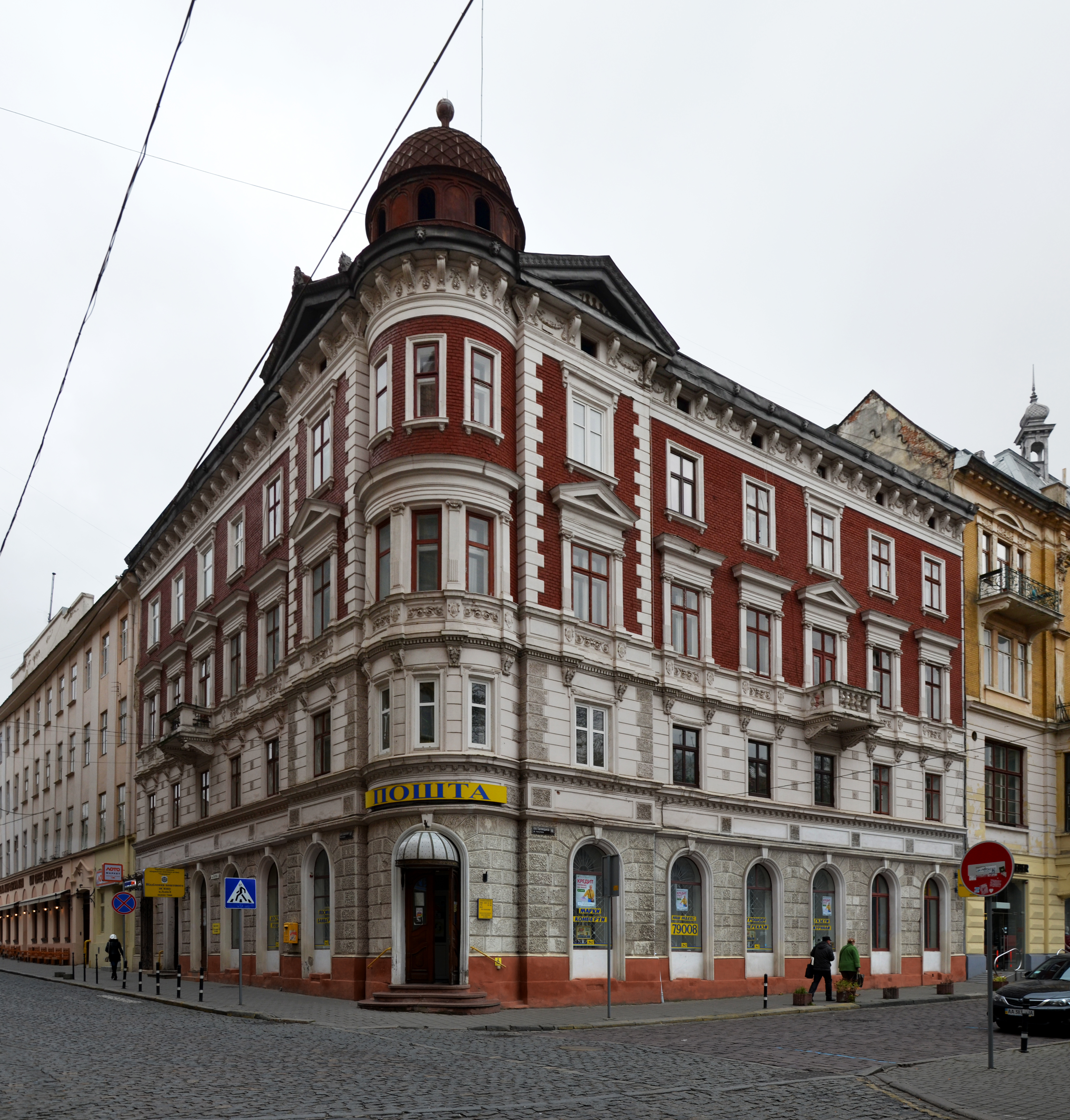
Former residence of the Russophile Kachkovsky Society in Lviv

Lacking support within their community and from the Austrian government, the remaining Russophiles turned to outsiders for support and became more radical in their politics. They founded the Russian National Party, called for complete identification with Russia and promoted the conversion of the western Ukrainian people to Orthodoxy. The Russophiles now largely depended on financing from the Russian government and Russian private sponsors (the Galician-Russian Benevolent Society was established in Saint Petersburg in 1908) and from ultraconservative Galician Polish aristocrats. The Polish ultraconservatives had become alarmed by the social mobilization of the Ukrainian peasants and sought to use the Russophile movement as a way of dividing the Ukrainian community. They were also united with the Russophiles in opposition to a proposed alliance between Ukrainophiles and politically moderate Poles. Polish support provided the Russophiles with some advantages during elections, some advantages for Russophile priests in obtaining parishes, and tolerance towards Russophile political activities. The Russophiles also attempted, with some limited success, to exploit the differences between Ukrainian petty gentry and peasants. The gentry were somewhat more likely to support Russophilia than were peasants. A noble candidate in the elections of 1911, Ivan Kulchytsky, declared "now we have recovered our sight and shall not allow the bastards to trick us with Ukraine…. You should know that from now on we do not give a damn for Ukraine and have returned to the historical road. From now on we are Russians."

Help from Russian and Polish patrons largely failed to prevent the Russophile decline. By the early 20th century, the Russophiles became a minority in Galicia. Within the Church, they were nicknamed "bisons," in scholar Himka's words an "ancient, shaggy species on the verge of extinction." Of nineteen Ukrainian periodicals published in Galicia in 1899, sixteen were Ukrainophile in orientation, only two were Russophile in orientation and one was neutral. In the 1907 elections to the Viennese parliament, the Ukrainophiles won 22 seats while the Russophiles won five. But the Russophiles, due to Polish interference, won elections to the Galician parliament the same year by taking 11 seats, the Ukrainophiles 10. In 1913, 30 Ukrainophile and only 1 Russophile delegate were sent to the Galician Diet. There were certain regional patterns in the support for Russophilism, in that it was most popular in the extreme western parts of eastern Galicia, particularly in the Lemko region of centred on the city of Przemyśl. This region, closest to Polish ethnographic territory, may have been most receptive to Russophilia's radical differentiation of Ukrainians/Ruthenians from Poles.

== World War I and afterwards ==
Immediately before the outbreak of World War I, the Austrian and Hungarian governments held numerous treason trials of those suspected of Russophile subversion. When the Austrians were driven from Galicia in August 1914, they avenged themselves upon suspected Russophiles and their families. Russophiles were punished for allegedly seeking to separate Galicia, Northern Bukovina and parts of northern Hungary from Austria-Hungary and attaching them to Russia, of seeking volunteers for the Russian army, and of organizing a pro-Russian paramilitary group known as the Russkie Druzhiny – a Russophile counterpart to the Ukrainophile pro-Austrian Ukrainian Sich Riflemen. Hundreds of suspected Russophiles were shot, and thirty thousand were sent to the Talerhof concentration camp, where approximately three thousand died of exposure. The camp was closed by Blessed Emperor Charles I of Austria, 6 months into his reign.

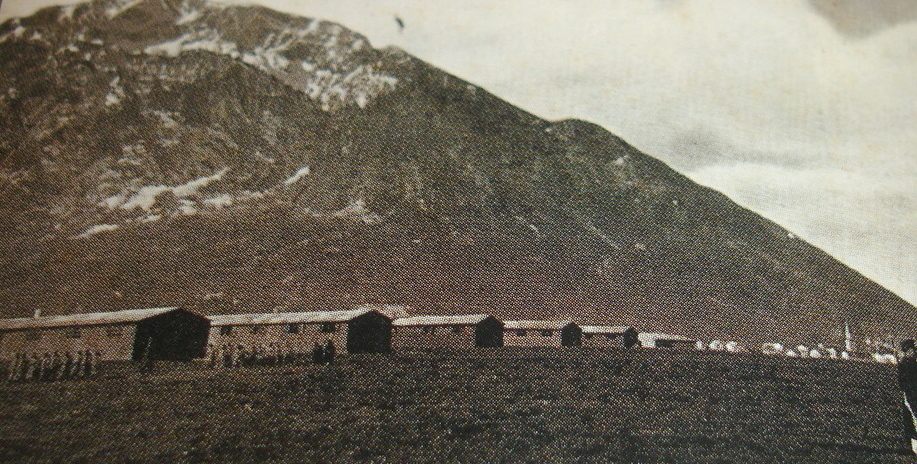
Talerhof Concentration Camp, where 30,000 alleged Russophiles were interned by Austria during World War I

The Russian administration of Galicia lasted from August 1914 until June 1915. Russian Grand Duke Nicholas issued a manifesto proclaiming that the people of Galicia were brothers who had "languished for centuries under a foreign yoke" and urged them to "raise the banner of United Russia." During this time, with the help of local Russophiles, the Russian administration, aware that the Ukrainophiles were loyal to the Austro-Hungarian Empire and that they had organized the Ukrainian legion of the Austro-Hungarian army, engaged in a harsh persecution of the Ukrainophile leaders and their ideology. Ukrainian schools were forcibly converted to Russian-language instruction, reading rooms, newspapers, co-operatives and credit unions were closed, and hundreds of community leaders were arrested and exiled under suspicion of collaboration. The popular head of the Ukrainian Greek Catholic Church, Metropolitan Andrey Sheptytsky, was arrested and exiled to Russia. Although Nicholas II issued a decree forbidding forceful conversion from Uniatism to Orthodoxy, except in cases where 75% of the parishioners approved, the ultimate goal was the liquidation of the Ukrainian Catholic Church. In addition to its head, hundreds of priests were exiled to Russia and replaced by Orthodox priests, who urged the parishioners to convert to Orthodoxy. The behaviour of the Russian authorities was so heavy-handed that it was denounced as a "European scandal" in the Russian Duma by the Russian statesman Pavel Milyukov. The Russians were aided in their suppression of Ukrainian culture by local Russophiles and by Polish anti-Ukrainian figures such as Lviv professor Stanisław Grabski. Such actions angered most of the local Ukrainian population.

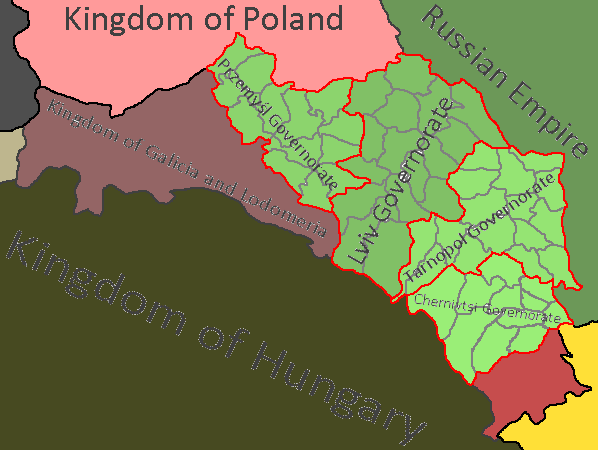
Subdivisions of the General Government

Russia organised Galicia into four governorates:

- Lvov Governorate
- Ternopol Governorate
- Chernovtsy Governorate
- Peremyshl Governorate

When Austria regained Galicia in June 1915, most of the remaining Galician Russophiles and their families retreated alongside the Russian army in fear of reprisals. Approximately 25,000 of them were resettled near Rostov-on-Don. Among those that did not leave, the Austrians arrested and sentenced to death approximately thirty noted Russophiles, including two members of parliament, Dmytro Markov and Volodymyr Kurylovich (their sentences were commuted to life imprisonment and they were released in 1917), as well as Metodyj Trochanovskij. Kost Levitsky, a prominent Ukrainophile leader and the future president of the West Ukrainian National Republic, appeared as a prosecutor during the trials against the Russophiles.

When civil war broke out in Russia, some Galician Russophiles then fought in the ranks of the White Army, specifically under Lavr Kornilov, in the hope that Galicia would become part of a democratic White Russia.

After the collapse of Austria–Hungary, the Ukrainians of Galicia proclaimed the West Ukrainian National Republic. Between 70 and 75 thousand men fought in its Ukrainian Galician Army. They lost their war and the territory was annexed by Poland. However, the experience of proclaiming a Ukrainian state and fighting for it significantly intensified and deepened the Ukrainian orientation within Galicia.

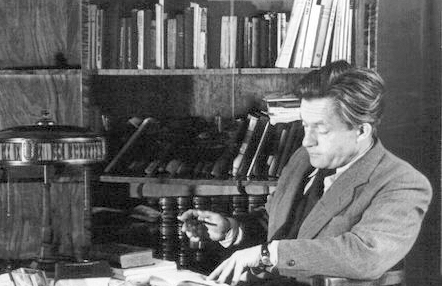
A 1947 photo of Yaroslav Halan, a prominent Communist activist and writer from Western Ukraine, who stemmed from a Russophile family

The Russophile movement barely clung on during the interwar period, supported by the Polish government which funded and granted Russophiles some institutions such as the Stauropegion Institute (which was returned to Russophiles in 1922 after it had been given to the Ukrainophiles in 1915) and which subsidized the movement in order to try to divide Ukrainian society. This had little effect beyond the Lemko regions in the extreme west, and since the interwar era, Galicia has been the centre of Ukrainian nationalism.

Some Russophiles became advocates for the unification of Western Ukrainian territories with Soviet Ukraine and, thus, sympathetic to the Soviet Union. Writer Olha Kobylianska, who openly endorsed the Bolshevik Revolution and was an opponent of the Union of Bukovina with Romania, was a strong advocate for the secession of Bukovina from Romania and its unification with Soviet Ukraine, as part of the Soviet Union.

Russophilia disappeared in western Ukraine during and after Soviet rule. The Soviet government declared Rusyns to be a subgroup of Ukrainians and saw the "reunification" of Western Ukraine with the Ukrainian SSR as a major achievement. The Organisation of Ukrainian Nationalists and the Ukrainian Insurgent Army were most active in Galicia and after 1990 it became a stronghold of the moderate nationalist National Democracy and far-right parties like Svoboda.

== Rusynophilia ==
The Russophile tradition persisted in the portions of Galicia west of the Dukla Pass, resulting in the formation of the Lemko-Rusyn Republic. Metodyj Trochanovskij continued to espouse the Rusyn national identity, up to the start of World War II. The Republic later tried to join Czechoslovakia but was annexed by Poland. Karpatska Rus', a Rusyn language newspaper published in the United States, avoided any suggestion that the Lemkos were a branch of the Ukrainians. Ukrainophiles founded the Komańcza Republic and the Hutsul Republic, all of these republics ceased to exist by 1920.

The conflict between Russophiles and Ukrainophiles remained dominant among Rusyn parties under the First Czechoslovak Republic. Hungary and Poland began to give financial support to the Autonomous Agrarian Union of Andrej Bródy and the Russian National Autonomous Party to weaken the Ukrainian nationalist and national democratic movement. In 1938, Carpathian Ruthenia gained its autonomy under the Prime Minister Andrej Bródy but was deposed on 11 October 1938, when he was revealed to be a Hungarian agent. He was succeeded by Ukrainophile Avgustyn Voloshyn who renamed the region to Carpatho-Ukraine.

Results of Chamber of Deputies elections in Subcarpathian Rus'
Parties		1924	1925	1929	1935
	Communist	39.4%	30.8%	15.2%	25.6%
Russophiles	AZS	8.3%	11.7%	18.3%	14.9%
Russophiles	KTP	7.9%	6.3%	18.3%	3.6%
Russophiles	RNP	1.1%	1.3%	18.3%	9.3%
Hungarians	MNP	11.1%	11.8%	11.4%	11%
Hungarians	Others	2.3%	0.4%	–	–
Ukrainophiles	SDRPnPR	8.3%	7.4%	8.6%	9.6%
Ukrainophiles	RKhP	4.4%	3%	3.4%	2.4%
Czechoslovaks	RSZML	5.9%	13.9%	29.1%	19.6%
Czechoslovaks	Others	0.5%	–	2.8%	2.8%

Calls for a Lemko autonomous region in Poland persisted at least until 1989, with a Rusyn rather than Russian orientation.

In recent times Rusyn communities in Slovakia became a stronghold for national populist and left-wing parties. In the 2002 parliamentary election, nationalist populist HZDS (26.42%), Communist Party of Slovakia (22.95%) and Smer (14%) were the largest parties in communes with a high Rusyn population. In the 2019 presidential election, Smer's Maroš Šefčovič and Štefan Harabin had a positive correlation with Greek Catholic and Eastern Orthodox communities. In the 2024 European Parliament election, Smer won 35% of the Rusyn vote followed by the far-right Republic Movement (15%) and the social democratic Hlas with 12%.

The Russophile Party of Regions in Ukraine had been sympathetic to the Rusyn cause and made the Rusyn language a recognised minority language in the 2012 law "On the Principles of State Language Policy". In 2012, the Party of Regions won the plurality in modern Zakarpattia Oblast with 30.9% but their Hungarian support played a role in their performance. Meanwhile, the three opposition parties Batkivshchyna, UDAR and Svoboda got 56% combined and Rusyn identity is in decline and there are only some localities in which people who identified as Rusyn in the 2001 Ukrainian census crossed 10%. After the Euromaidan in 2014 which saw the collapse of said party, the law was cancelled for a while and a new wave of Ukrainisation began. In 2019, the law had been replaced by the Law of Ukraine "On protecting the functioning of the Ukrainian language as the state language" which declares Ukrainian the "State (official) language in Ukraine".

== Political organizations ==
- Autonomous Agrarian Union (1924–1939, Czechoslovakia)
- Carpatho-Russian Labour Party of Small Peasants and Landless (1919–1939, Czechoslovakia)
- Russian Executive Committee (Poland)
- Russian National Autonomous Party (1935–1946, Czechoslovakia)
- Russian National Party (1900–1939)
- Russian Peasant Organization (1921–1939, Poland)

== See also ==
- All-Russian nation
- Little Russian identity
- Conversion of Chełm Eparchy
- Russian occupation of Eastern Galicia, 1914–15
- Stauropegion Institute
- Talerhof
