= Josef Kaminský =

Slovak politician

Josef Kaminský (1878, Rakovec nad Ondavou – 1944, Uzhhorod) was a Slovak politician in interwar Czechoslovakia. He died in 1944. He worked as a newspaper editor. He was elected to the Czechoslovak Chamber of Deputies in the 1924 Užhorod electoral district by-election, the sole candidate of the Carpathian Republican Peasants Party elected.
