= Jaromír Nečas =

Czech politician (1888–1945)

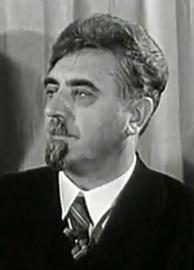
Jaromír Nečas in 1938

Jaromír Nečas (17 November 1888 in Nové Město na Moravě – 30 January 1945 in Merthyr Mawr) was a Czech politician. He was one of the leading figures in the Social Democratic Workers' Party in Subcarpathian Rus'. He was elected to the Czechoslovak National Assembly in 1924 and 1925 from the Užhorod constituency (which had nine parliamentary seats), as a candidate of the joint list of the Subcarpatian and Czechoslovak social democratic parties.
