= 1924 Užhorod by-election =

Election in Czechoslovakia district

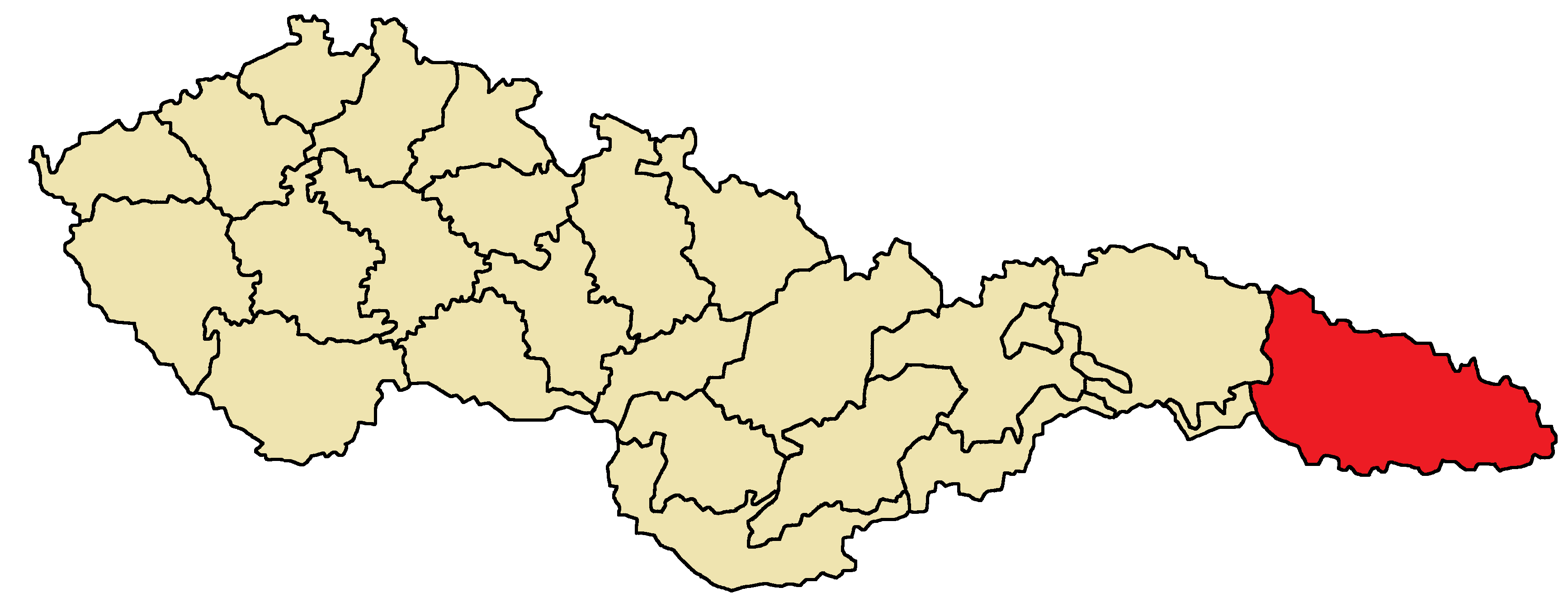
Užhorod electoral district

Elections for deputies to the Czechoslovak parliament from the Užhorod electoral district (i.e. Subcarpathian Ruthenia) were held on 16 March 1924 (to the assembly elected in the 1920 Czechoslovak parliamentary election). Nine members of the Chamber of Deputies and four senators were elected.

== Background ==
As borders in Europe shifted at the end of World War I, the Ruthenian region of north-eastern Hungary was awarded to the new Czechoslovak Republic. Subcarpathian Rus' (also referred to as Carpathian Ruthenia, Transcarpathian Ruthenia, Transcarpathian Ukraine, etc., today constituting the Zakarpattia Oblast of Ukraine) hosted about 3.5% of the population of the Czechoslovak Republic. It was the least economically developed part of the Republic.

The concepts of national identity of its Slavic population varied, some saw themselves as Russians, some defined themselves as Ukrainians and some argued that they constituted a separate Ruthenian nation. Some 14% of the population was Jewish.

Elections for representatives to the Czechoslovak parliament from Subcarpathian Rus' had been delayed for some time, as the area had been placed under a joint military-civilian administration. Considering chaotic situation in the area with unstable borders, Romanian occupation until mid-1920 of large parts of the area and the lack of a regional assembly, the Czechoslovak government decided to delay voting for parliamentarians from Subcarpathian Rus'. On 16 September 1923 local elections were held in the area. Transitioning into civilian governance under the Czechoslovak Republic, Dr. Antonín Beskid was appointed governor of Subcarpathian Rus'. On 23 February 1924 the Czechoslovak government reported to the League of Nations was about to be held on 16 March and that the Czechoslovaks would report the results to the League of Nations by June 16 the same year.

== Parties ==
Thirteen parties participated in the polls.

=== Communist Party of Czechoslovakia ===
The Communist Party had a strong Jewish following in Subcarpathian Rus'. In the September 1923 village council elections in Subcarpathian Rus' the Communist Party had received less than 10% of the vote. For the 1924 by-election Communist Party ran an active campaign in spite of the prevailing repressive climate, with arrests of their agitators and ban on communist meetings. According to government sources the Communist Party held more mass meetings than any of the other parties in the fray.

=== Indigenous Autonomous Party ===
On 19 February 1924 opposition sympathizers held a meeting in Berehove, at which the list for the (Hungarian) Ruthenia Indigenous Autonomous Party was set. For the Chamber of Deputies the meeting nominated (in order on the list) Endre Korláth (Užhorod), Ákos Árky (Užhorod), Miklós Jaczik (Užhorod), István Polchy (Berehove), Lajos Szabó (Mukačevo), Bálint Tóth (Nove Selo), József Eperjessy (Užhorod), Pál Turda (Tekovo), János Földes (Časlovci), Ferenc Nagyidai (Perekresztye) and Zsigmond Boross (Užhorod). For the Senate the candidates nominated were Ferenc Egry (Maloye Geyovtse), Sándor Hatfaludy (Nyizsnyaja Apsa), Gyula Jaross (Perečín), János Spolarits (Veľká Sevljuš), Lajos Ács (Tyachovo) and Mihály Weisz (Verkhniy Koropets).

== Results ==
=== Chamber of Deputies ===
All in all, parties supporting the Czechoslovak government obtained 40% of the vote.

The deputies elected were József Gáti, Josef Kaminský, Endre Korláth, Iván Kurtyák, Iván Mondok, Jaromír Nečas, Andrij Hahatko, Emanuel Safranko, Vaszil Scserecki and Nyikolaj Szedorják.

Party	Votes	%	Seats
Communist Party of Czechoslovakia	100,242	39.43	5
Indigenous Autonomous Party	28,113	11.06	1
Autonomous Agrarian Union	21,161	8.32	1
Social Democratic Workers' Party in Subcarpathian Rus'–Czechoslovak Social Democratic Workers Party	20,998	8.26	1
Carpatho-Russian Labour Party of Small Peasants and Landless–Czechoslovak Socialist Party	20,068	7.89	1
Jewish People's Party	17,941	7.06	0
Carpathian Republican Peasants Party	15,058	5.92	0
Bread Producers Party	11,107	4.37	0
Jewish Democratic Party	9,914	3.90	0
Independent Hungarian Social Democratic Party	2,828	1.11	0
Russian National Party–Czech National Democrats	2,780	1.09	0
Hungarian Civic Party	2,748	1.08	0
Smallholders Party	1,242	0.49	0
Total	254,200	100.00	9

=== Senate ===
The senators elected were Ivan Bodnar (Communist), Endre Csehy (Communist), Ferenc Egry (Hungarian) and Béla Riskó (AZS).

Party	Votes	%	Seats
Communist Party of Czechoslovakia	82,273	38.71	2
Indigenous Autonomous Party	24,944	11.74	1
Autonomous Agrarian Union	20,015	9.42	1
Carpatho-Russian Labour Party of Small Peasants and Landless–Czechoslovak Socialist Party	16,753	7.88	0
Social Democratic Workers' Party in Subcarpathian Rus'–Czechoslovak Social Democratic Workers Party	16,605	7.81	0
Jewish People's Party	15,850	7.46	0
Carpathian Republican Peasants Party	12,242	5.76	0
Bread Producers Party	10,717	5.04	0
Jewish Democratic Party	5,918	2.78	0
Independent Hungarian Social Democratic Party	2,364	1.11	0
Russian National Party–Czech National Democrats	2,358	1.11	0
Hungarian Civic Party	2,477	1.17	0
Total	212,516	100.00	4

== Aftermath ==
In the rest of Czechoslovakia the key vote bank of the Communist Party was found amongst industrial labourers, but in this region industrial workers were a smaller part of the electorate than in other areas. Thus the result reflected wide-spread discontent amongst poor peasants in the area. It also appeared that the party did well amongst the Hungarian and Jewish minorities. In his report to the fifth congress of the Communist International Grigory Zinoviev stated that

Hitherto, even in agrarian countries, Communist parties have displayed remarkable inability in the matter of capturing the peasantry. [...] You know the result of the election in Carpathian-Russia. Many Czech comrades, Tausig, Gati, and others, particularly local comrades worked heroically and exposed themselves to great danger. I have the impression, however, that the Czech party on the whole does not appreciate the importance of the peasants' question in Czecho-Slovakia, and this proves the importance of being able to work among the peasants. [...] Instead of concerning themselves with "high politics," most of our Communist parties must be intent on carrying on Communist work among masses, forming Communist factory nuclei and adopting a correct attitude towards national and peasant question.

In response to the communist election victory, the Czech right-wing press demanded that the election be declared invalid.

Neither of the Jewish parties won any seat, as the Jewish vote was split between two parties.
