= Czechization =

Cultural change in which something non-Czech is made to become Czech

Czechization or Czechisation (also Bohemization; Czech: čechizace, počeštění, bohemizace; German: Tschechisierung) is a cultural change in which something ethnically or linguistically non-Czech becomes Czech.

This concept is especially relevant in relation to the Germans of Bohemia, Moravia and Czech Silesia as well as the Poles of Trans-Olza who have come under increased pressure of Czechization after the breakup of Austria-Hungary and the formation of a Czechoslovak nation state in 1919 (see Germans in Czechoslovakia (1918-1938)); to a smaller extent, it has also occurred with Slovaks and Rusyns.

== Czechization involving Germany/Germans ==
With the expulsion of the majority of Germans and the partial resettlement of previously German-speaking parts of Czechoslovakia by Czechs, these territories became czechized after World War II.

"In June 1905, the German language paper Bohemia of Prague reported czechization in Saxony, Germany after a great influx of Czech workers had czechified the town of Ostritz. According to Saxon officials, the reports were greatly exaggerated. They conceded that while Czech speakers in Saxon communities were fewer than popularly supposed, they were nevertheless worth watching."

== See also ==
- Demographics of Czechoslovakia
- Demographics of the Czech Republic
- Germans in Czechoslovakia (1918-1938)
- Poles in Czechoslovakia
- Ruthenians and Ukrainians in Czechoslovakia (1918-1938)
- Slovaks in Czechoslovakia (1918–1938)
