= Russian occupation of Eastern Galicia (1914–1915) =

On August 18, 1914, the Russian Empire invaded the Austrian Crownland of Galicia. On August 19, the Imperial Russian Army defeated the Austro-Hungarian Army, advanced 280–300 kilometers into the territory of Austria-Hungary and captured most of eastern Galicia. The principal city, Lemberg (Lviv) fell into Russian hands on September 3. Eastern Galicia had a population of approximately 4.8 million people.

Greek Catholic Ukrainians made up approximately 65% of the population of Eastern Galicia while Poles made up 22% of the population. It was the last large Eastern Slavic territory and the last historic part of the medieval state of Kievan Rus' to fall under Romanov rule. The Russian Empire controlled and administered this territory of Austria-Hungary from September 1914 until June 1915. Throughout the occupation, the Tsarist officials pursued a policy of integrating Galicia with the Russian Empire, forcibly Russifying local Ruthenians, and persecuting both Jews and Greek Catholics.

== Background ==
The territory of eastern Galicia had once been an integral part of the medieval state of Kievan Rus' before existing as an independent kingdom and principality until 1349. From the mid 14th century until 1772 it had been ruled by Poland. Following the First Partition of Poland in 1772 it became a part of the Austrian Empire (see Austrian Partition). The Austrian government emancipated the Ukrainian peasants from serfdom, introduced a rudimentary educational system, and raised the status of Ukrainian Catholic priests in a way that made them equal to Roman Catholic priests. These reforms ensured the loyalty of most of the Ukrainian population to the Austrian state. When the Austrian Empire was reorganized as Austria-Hungary eastern Galicia continued to be under Austria's jurisdiction and remained this way until the Empire's collapse following World War I.

According to the 1900 Austrian census Eastern Galicia had a population of 4.8 million people, of whom approximately 65% were Ukrainian, 22% Polish and 13% Jewish. Rivalries between the ethnic groups and between political factions within those ethnic groups would shape the occupation policies of the Russian administration.

Although a minority, prior to World War I the Poles wielded considerable political power due to their domination of the province prior to Austrian rule and the near monopoly of power within the local government. Much of the land was owned by Polish aristocrats and Poles were a majority of the population in the territory's largest city and cultural capital, Lviv.

Eastern Galicia's Ukrainians predominated in rural areas and were primarily peasants or priests. Historically, the Ukrainians of eastern Galicia had had an ideological rivalry between Ukrainophiles – people who considered themselves to be part of the Ukrainian nation – and Russophiles – those who believed that Ukraine was an artificial creation and that Ukrainians were part of the Russian nation. Russophiles dominated western Ukrainian society in the mid 19th century but by the beginning of the First World War had been eclipsed by the Ukrainophiles. No longer widely popular within their own community, the Russophiles depended on support from Russia (such as from the Galician-Russian Benevolent Society based in St. Petersburg) and from Polish aristocrats who used their movement to split Ukrainian society. This support notwithstanding, both Russophiles and Ukrainophiles were opposed to the Poles whom they considered to be historical oppressors. However, the Russophiles were loyal to Russia and hoped that the war would bring about the integration of eastern Galicia with Russia while the Ukrainophiles, in contrast, were loyal to Austria and hoped that the war would bring about a dismemberment of the Russian Empire and the emergence of an independent Ukraine in its territory. Both factions within the Ukrainian community were bitterly opposed to each other.

Galicia's Jews, seeing the Habsburg dynasty as their protectors and considering the Russian state to be antisemitic, were generally quite loyal to Austria during the war.

On the eve of World War I, with war against Russia looming, the Austrian authorities began a wave of persecution against the Russophiles. Hundreds were arrested, and Russophile organizations and newspapers were shut.

Former Russian Interior Minister Pyotr Durnovo was an outspoken opponent of the annexation of eastern Galicia. Writing in February 1914, he claimed that the people had for the most part lost all connection to the Russian fatherland, and that in addition to a "negligible handful" of Russophile Ukrainian Galicians, Russia would take in large numbers of Poles, Jews, and Ukrainophile Ukrainians. Durnovo wrote that currently Ukrainian separatism was not a threat to Russia but that annexing a territory with many Ukrainian nationalists could plant seeds within Russia for a dangerous movement and that this might have unexpected consequences. Despite this warning, most Russian political figures across the political spectrum supported annexing eastern Galicia. Mikhail Rodzianko, chairman of the State Duma, declared that war against a common enemy would unite all nationalities within Russia, a sentiment echoed by the liberal politician Alexander Kerensky.

== Russian rule ==
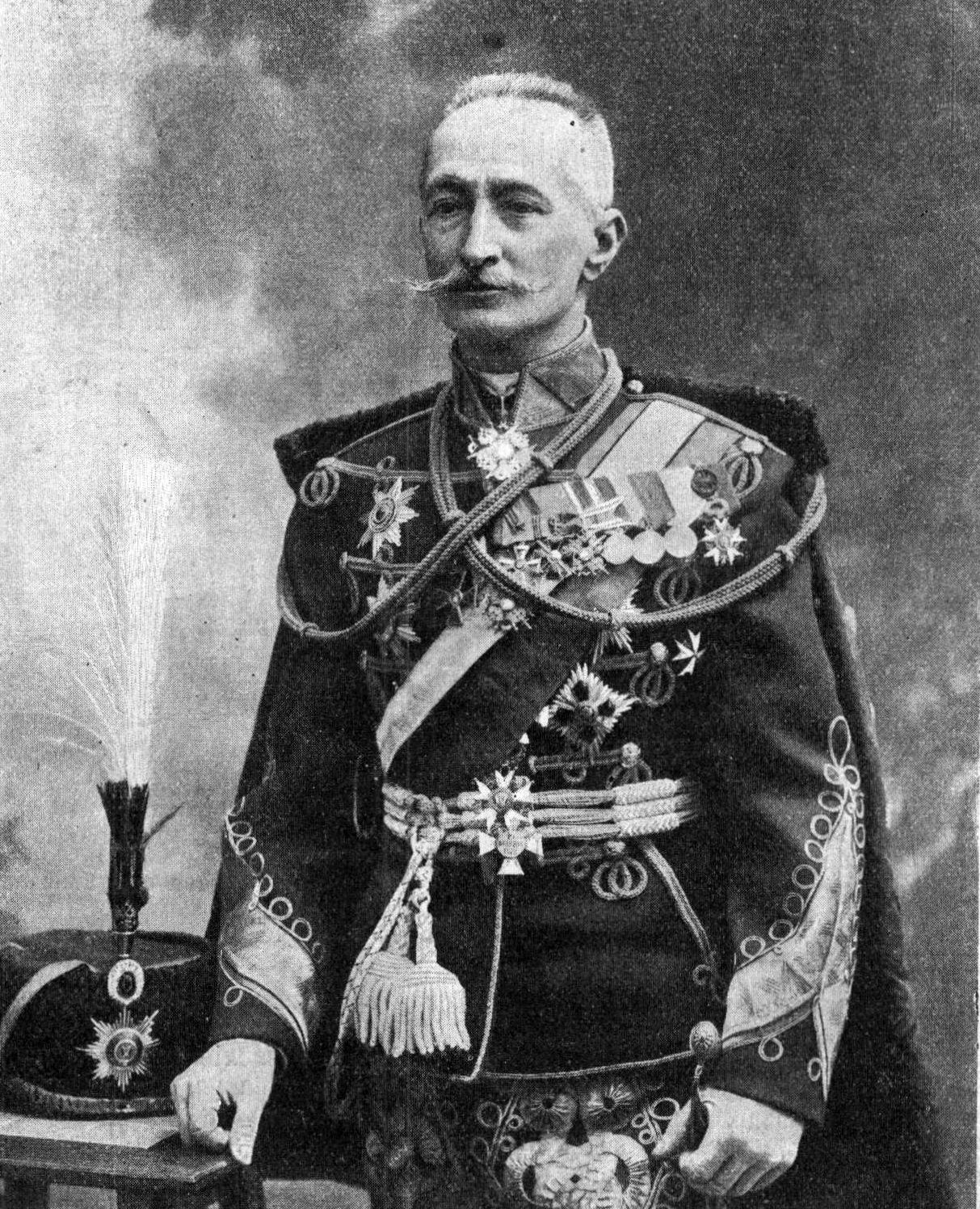
Aleksei Brusilov, Commander of Russian forces occupying Galicia

In his first orders to the Russian troops crossing into eastern Galicia, General Aleksei Brusilov, commander of the Russian forces, proclaimed "We are entering Galicia, which despite its being a constituent part of Austria-Hungary, is a Russian land from time immemorial, populated, after all, by Russian people (russkim zhe narodom). The Russian commander-in-chief, Grand Duke Nicholas issued a manifesto portraying the people of Galicia as brothers who had "languished for centuries under a foreign yoke" and urging them to "raise the banner of United Russia."

Initially, General Aleksei Brusilov and Army Chief of Staff Nikolai Yanushkevich played a large role in formulating Russian policies in eastern Galicia. The first governor General was Sergei Sheremetev. He cooperated closely with Poles loyal to Russia and pursued a pro-Polish policy that included the opening of Polish schools. This aroused the outrage of local Russophiles, who successfully pushed for his removal. Sheremetev's replacement, Count Georgiy Bobrinsky, would govern eastern Galicia for approximately nine months until the Russian retreat in June 1915.

The Russian administration in Galicia was marked by tension between General Brusilov and Count Bobrinsky on the one hand, and local Galician Russophiles, the Russian Orthodox Church, and Russian extremists both within the local administration and from Russia itself on the other hand. While all of these groups saw the Russification and integration of Galicia with Russia as their ultimate goal, Brusilov and Bobrinsky wanted to avoid any disturbances immediately behind the Russian front, and thus sought to moderate Russian policies in order to prevent the possibility of insurrection. The latter groups, on the other hand, wanted to pursue Russification as quickly as possible. This conflict was reflected in the fact that Galician Russophile newspapers closed by the Austrians were only allowed to resume working after considerable delay: Bobrinsky's administration often censored them due to their perceived extremist or inflammatory writings.

=== Political organization ===
Commander of the Russian Army Grand Duke Nicholas in Lviv in front of Russian medical workers

General Brusilov's initial orders were for Austrian laws to remain in effect and for Austrian officials to continue their duties – in the name of the Russian tsar instead of the Austrian emperor – as long as they would not be suspected of possible treason to the new Russian authorities. This policy proved difficult, because many Austrian officials had fled, and because the loyalty to Russia of those who remained was in doubt. Initially local Galician Russophiles were used to staff positions. However, in time the bureaucracy came to be staffed overwhelmingly by officials transferred in from neighboring regions of the Russian Empire. As often happens in such reassignments, the bureaucrats of the neighboring regions took advantage of the opportunity to transfer out those with the least amount of ability, experience or education as well as those who caused trouble. As a result, in addition to understaffing the Russian administration in Galicia suffered from poor quality in personnel. Many of the transferees belonged to right-wing Russian nationalist parties who espoused anti-Semitism as well as hostility towards Ukrainians and Poles.

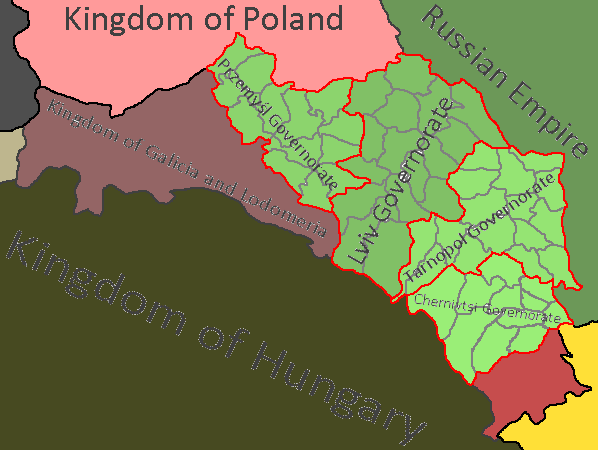
Subdivisions of the General Government

In late 1914, Lemberg, Ternopil and Chernivtsi regions were designated as separate guberni:

- Lvov Governorate
- Ternopol Governorate
- Chernovtsy Governorate
- Peremyshl Governorate

=== Educational policy ===
In mid-September 1914 all schools in eastern Galicia were temporarily shut down pending the introduction of Russian-language instruction. The Russian government then subsidized special Russian-language courses for Galician teachers. Maria Lokjhvitskaya-Skalon, the founder of several educational institutions in St. Petersburg, arrived in Galicia to help in this effort by organizing courses in the Russian language, Russian literature and Russian history. Much of the work involved in Russifying the schools was coordinated by the Galician-Russian Benevolent Society. Many scholarships were set up for Galician "Russophile comrades" who wanted to attend Russian-language universities.

=== Anti-Catholicism ===
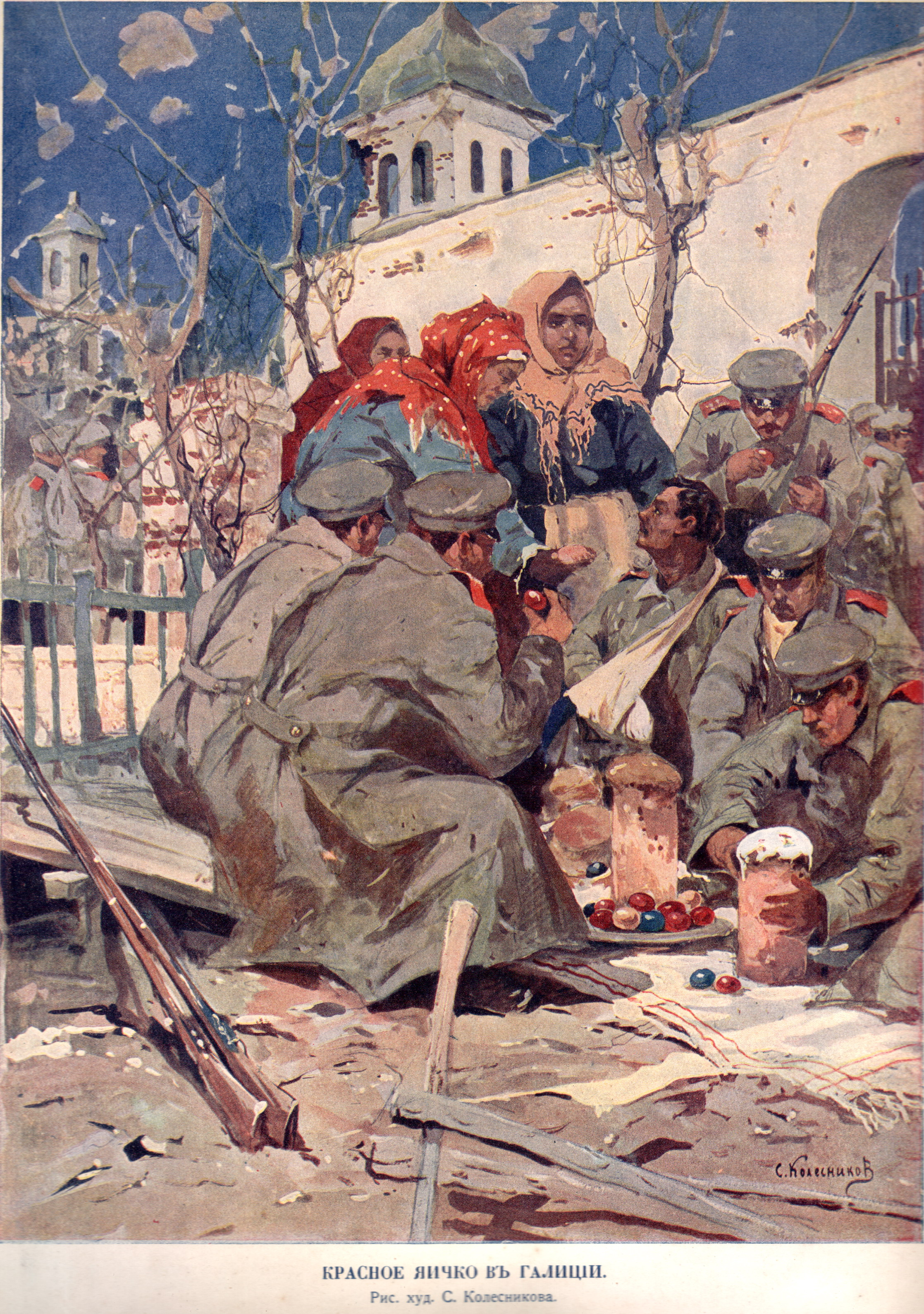
Easter in Galicia. Painting by S. Kolesnikov. 1915

Soon after Russian soldiers crossed into eastern Galicia, the Holy Synod of the Russian Orthodox Church met in a special session to discuss how to organize the religious life of the "Russian population" of Galicia. Evlogii, the archbishop of Volynia and Zhytomir, was appointed to lead Orthodox missionary work in Galicia. The ultimate Russian goal with respect to the Ukrainian Catholic Church that dominated Ukrainian religious life in Galicia was its complete destruction. The popular head of the Ukrainian Greek Catholic Church, Metropolitan Andrey Sheptytsky, perceived as a "father figure" by most Galician Ukrainians, was arrested and imprisoned in an Orthodox monastery for delinquent priests in Suzdal. The Metropolitan's imprisonment caused angry questions to be raised by members of the Opposition in the Duma and diplomatic protests from both the Vatican and the United States. While Tsar Nicholas II issued a decree forbidding forced conversions from Catholicism to Orthodoxy, except in cases where 75% of the parishioners approved, hundreds of Ukrainian Catholic priests were exiled to Siberia and replaced by Orthodox priests, who then demanded that the parishioners to convert to Orthodoxy and speak only Russian. Tsarist authorities were so obsessed with converting Byzantine Catholics to Orthodoxy that army chief Russian Grand Duke Nicholas complained that ammunition trains desperately needed by the Russian army were being commandeered for the purpose of transporting Russian priests into Galicia. More than anything else, Russian persecution of the Ukrainian Catholic Church turned Galician peasants and even formerly Russophile intellectuals against the occupation.

=== Policies toward local nationalities ===
The Russian authorities referred to the local majority as Galician Russians and actively opposed those who maintained a Ukrainian orientation. Thousand of Ukrainian political and cultural figures were arrested and deported. All Ukrainian bookstores were closed and a ban was instituted on Ukrainian-language works printed abroad. Local Russophiles played a significant role in identifying those in the Ukrainian population who could be considered traitors to the Russian authorities.

East Galicia's Jewish population were assumed by the Russian authorities to be loyal to Austria and were therefore treated as potential spies and traitors. The Jewish community's publications were censored, and Jews faced arrest and deportation. Jews were taken as hostages in order to prevent alleged spying for Austria by the Jewish community. In February 1915 the Russian authorities banned Jews from moving into eastern Galicia and banned all publication and correspondence in the Yiddish language.

== Reaction ==
The behavior of the Russian authorities was so heavy-handed that it was denounced as a "European scandal" in the Russian Duma by the Russian statesman Pavel Milyukov. Between 1914 and 1915, Jewish newspapers throughout Austria vividly described Russian policy as barbaric and described gruesome details of alleged Russian atrocities against Jews. Zionists in particular identified Jewish and Austrian aims against the common Russian enemy.

== Aftermath ==
When Austria regained Galicia in June 1915, most of the remaining Russophiles and their families retreated alongside the Russian army in fear of reprisals. "Galician Russians" were granted exemptions by the Russian government to the traditional 5-year residency requirement for Russian citizenship, and approximately 25,000 of them were resettled near Rostov-on-Don. In addition, many Jews and ethnic Germans were accused of being spies and deported east. The flood of refugees was so great that they blocked the roads, interfering with Russian military movements. Among the Russophiles who stayed in Galicia, the Austrians arrested and sentenced to death approximately thirty noted Russophiles, including two members of the Austrian parliament, Dmytro Markov and Volodymyr Kurylovich (their sentences were commuted to life imprisonment and they were released in 1917), as well as Metodyj Trochanovskij. Kost Levitsky, a prominent Ukrainophile leader and the future president of the West Ukrainian National Republic, appeared as a prosecutor during the trials against the Russophiles.

After the Austro-Hungarian Army recaptured Galicia, the Crown Prince (the future Charles I of Austria) praised Galicia's Jews for their loyalty to the House of Habsburg during the occupation.

Following the evacuation of the Russian administration from Galicia to Kiev, Governor General's Bobrinsky's staff conducted a review of their policies in order to identify mistakes that they had made. The review concluded that the main source of difficulties was the "low educational and moral levels" of Russian officials sent to Galicia and that the pace of educational and cultural reforms was too quick and too brutal. Russian newspapers in Kiev concurred, and appealed for greater tolerance of the Ukrainian language, religion and culture.

=== Plans for future annexation ===
The Russian government sought recommendations in order to better solidify Russian rule should Galicia be retaken by Russian forces and annexed to Russia once again. Experts' conclusions varied. Aleksi Gerovsky suggested using positive methods of encouraging the Russian language and culture rather than repressive ones against Ukrainian-language institutions, and land and economic reform that would benefit Ukrainian peasants at the expense of Polish landlords and Jewish businessmen whose loyalty the tsarist authorities doubted anyway. It was felt that such reforms would undercut Ukrainophiles' appeals among the peasantry and would engender among Ukrainians a feeling that the Russians were their economic liberators. V. Svatkovskii, a spy based in Switzerland, felt that symbolically uniting Galicia with Ukrainians in the Russian Empire and playing upon anti-Polish sentiments rather than land reform would best gain Galicians' loyalty. Mikhail Tyshkevich, a prominent landowner in Kiev region, felt that making concessions on national rather than land reform issues would be helpful. He suggested that the tsar's son Aleksei be declared "Hetman of Little Russia," that portraits of him wearing a traditional Ukrainian costume be distributed in Ukraine, and that the Russian government ought to publish an official newspaper in the Ukrainian language. While all manifestations of political separatism ought to be stamped out, Ukrainian national aspirations should be supported. In Tyshkevich's words, "punish Mazepa but don't persecute Khmelnytsky." Such concessions on cultural matters, Tyshkevich felt, would create enough loyalty among the people to make economic reforms unnecessary. After having sent a telegram to the tsar declaring his loyalty to him, Nicholas II responded with a message thanking him, "and also the group of Ukrainian gathered in Switzerland, for the feelings expressed." This had been the first time that the tsar had used the word "Ukrainians" rather than Little Russians.

Drawing on these recommendations, the Russian government determined that in the future while the Russian language would remain the official language, Ukrainian would be permitted on a regional basis. The new administration was to be composed of strictly military personnel who would not be concerned with religious matters, and nor would it have a Russian nationalistic orientation. When the easternmost part of Galicia was briefly recaptured by the Russians in 1916, however, the Russians found that the region was economically devastated by the Russian scorched-earth policy during the previous retreat, as well as by the war, and that the population had become quite hostile towards the Russians and loyal towards the Austrians. Ukrainian and Polish schools were allowed to remain open and calls from Russian nationalistic circles within Russia to shut them down were ignored by the occupation authorities.

== See also ==
- Soviet annexation of Eastern Galicia and Volhynia

== Sources ==
- Mark Von Hagen. (2007). War in a European borderland: occupations and occupation plans in Galicia. Seattle: University of Washington Press ISBN 0-295-98753-7.
- Paul Robert Magocsi. (1996) A History of Ukraine University of Toronto Press ISBN 0-8020-0830-5.
