= Russian National Autonomous Party =

Political party in Czechoslovakia

Russian National Autonomous Party Руська національно-автономна партія
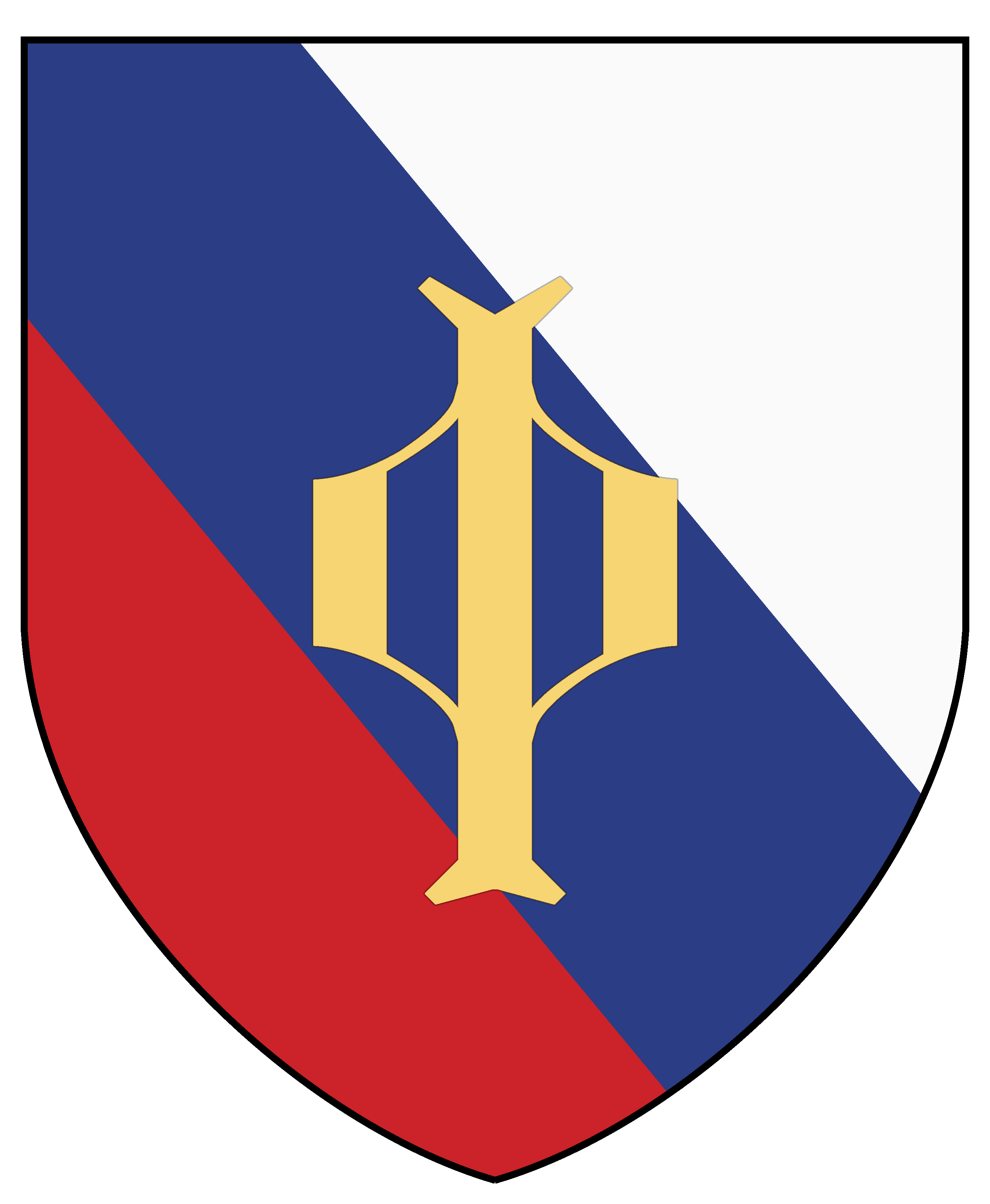
- Leader: Stefan Fentsik
- Founded: 1935
- Dissolved: 30 March 1946
- Paramilitary wing: Guard of the Blackshirts
- Ideology: Rusyn nationalism Fascism; Pan-Slavism; Neo-Slavism; Anticommunism; Antisemitism; Corporatism; Galician Russophilia
- Political position: Far-right
- Slogan: "Subcarpathian Rus for the Carpatho-Russians!"

Russian National Autonomous Party (Rusyn: Руська національно-автономна партія, romanized: Ruska natsionalno-avtonomna partia, Czech: Ruská nacionálně-autonomní strana) also called the Russian National Party was a political party established by ethnic Rusyns during the First Czechoslovak Republic. It was founded by Štepan Fencik, just ahead of the 1935 Czechoslovak parliamentary election, in March 1935 in Mukachevo. Fencik was elected to parliament. The party published Nash puť ('Our Path').

The party advocated for full political autonomy of Subcarpathian Rus' within the Second Czechoslovak Republic. Politically, it displayed antisemitic and far-right characteristics. In the programmatic declarations of the party, it demanded recognition of the Carpatho-Russian national minority, support of Slavic ideas and genuine democracy. The party received significant covert support from Hungary and Poland as all three had an interest in the weakening of Czechoslovakia.

The party was part of a broader Czechoslovak and Europe wide trend of increasing radicalization during the 1930's.

== Ideology ==
The parties program was adopted on March 31 1935. The first chapter was the political and legal section. In this section the party demanded a large degree of autonomy for Subcarpathian Ruthenia, the "Establishing of correct borders with Slovakia" which meant territorial expansion, demanding that all power within the region would be handed over to the governor, that local elections be held to the Sejm of the region, that local residents be appointed to official positions.

The second chapter demanded that the role of Russian in all aspects of regional life be expanded. specifically, that records in public authorities, courts, schools and military units of the region be kept in Russian, as well as the issuing of Russian language laws.

The third chapter was the "National and Cultural Part", here the party demanded the expansion of cultural rights for the region, the opening of theaters, libraries, a Subcarpathian University and a radio station. Here the party also conveyed against Czechization and anti-nationalism, called on the people of the region to "strengthen their nationalism", and declared their friendship with the other peoples of Czechoslovakia. These positions were largely a result of the support they received from Hungary and Poland.

Throughout the parties history, there was a gradual increase in the usage of antisemitic rhetoric.
