= Social Democratic Workers' Party in Subcarpathian Rus' =

Social Democratic Workers' Party in Subcarpathian Rus' Соціал-демократична робітнича партія на Підкарпатській Русі
- Leader: Jacko Ostapčuk
- Founded: 1919
- Dissolved: 1930
- Merged into: Czechoslovak Social; Democratic Workers' Party
- Ideology: Social democracy Democratic socialism Ukrainophilia
- Political position: Left-wing
- International affiliation: Labour and Socialist International

The Social Democratic Workers' Party in Subcarpathian Rus' (Ukrainian: Соціал-демократична робітнича партія на Підкарпатській Русі, Sotsial-demokratichna robitnicha partiya na Pidkarpats'kiy Rusi; Czech: Sociálně demokratická strana dělnická na Podkarpatské Rusi) was a social democratic political party in Carpathian Ruthenia (or Subcarpathian Rus') in Czechoslovakia. The party was founded in 1919. At the party congress in September 1922 the party adopted a party programme which acknowledged the inclusion of Carpathian Ruthenia as an autonomous region in the Czechoslovak Republic. The party obtained the support of the Gregory Žatkovich, the first governor of Subcarpathian Rus, during his tenure 1920–1921.

The main difference between the party and the Czechoslovak Social Democratic Workers Party (ČSDSD) was that ČSDSD supported the government in Prague, whilst the Subcarpathian party opposed it as the government did not support the formation of an autonomous region of all Rusyn-inhabited areas.

== Organization and leadership ==
The party had around 3,500 members. The party organization was based on individual memberships. The party activists came from working and middle-class background, recruiting members from the Rusyn, Hungarian, Jewish and Czech communities. The highest organ of the party was the party congress. The party established several cooperatives and trade unions, particularly in the lumber industry.

Leading members of the party included Jacko Ostapčuk, Julian Révaý, Jaromír Nečas, Dmytro Nimčuk, Stephan Kločurak and János Horváth.

== Elections ==
In the Czechoslovak National Assembly elections, the party contested the elections in the Užhorod constituency (which had nine parliamentary seats) in alliance with ČSDSD. The joint list won one of the nine Užhorod seats in the 1924, 1925 and 1929 elections; getting 23,800 votes (9.4% of the votes in Užhorod) in 1924, 18,200 votes (7.4%) in 1925 and 22,900 votes (8.6%) in 1929. In the 1924 and 1925 elections, the seat was won by Jaromír Nečas of the Social Democratic Workers Party in Subcarpathian Rus, in 1929 the seat was won by Julius Husnaj of the ČSDSD.

== Merger into ČSDSD ==
The party sent five delegates to the Prague joint conference of the Social Democratic parties in the Czechoslovak Republic January 28–29, 1928. The party congress of the Social Democratic Workers Party in Subcarpathian Rus held in Chust on December 22, 1929 decided to merge the party into the ČSDSD. The merger became effective in 1930, as the party became a territorial organization of ČSDSD.

== Press ==
The party published four weekly newspapers; Vpered (initially published in Rusyn from 1921, later in Ukrainian language; edited by Klocurak) was published from Užhorod, Hlas východu (Czech language, published 1928–1932) published from Užhorod, Ruszinszkoi Népszava (Hungarian language, edited by Horváth) and Szabadság (Hungarian language, published from Berehovo).

== International affiliation ==
The party was a member of the Labour and Socialist International from 1923 onwards.
