= Autonomous Agrarian Union =

Political party in Subcarpathian Rus', Czechoslovakia

The Autonomous Agrarian Union (Russian: Автономный Земледельческий Союз, romanized: Avtonomy Zemledchesky Soyuz), abbreviated AZS (Russian: АЗС) was a political party in Czechoslovakia, which fought for autonomy for Subcarpathian Rus' within the Second Czechoslovak Republic. The party was founded as the Subcarpathian Agrarian Union (Russian: Подкарпатский Земледельческий Союз, abbreviated ПЗС). The party published Russkij vestnik. It was represented in the Czechoslovak parliament by Ivan Kurtyak^{(ru)}.

The party was one of the more prominent Rusyn parties in Czechoslovakia. The party gathered support from farmers, teachers and pro-Rusyn members of Greek Catholic clergy. The supporters of the party included many landowning farmers who had been supportive of Hungarian rule and pro-Hungarian intellectuals and priests. The party functioned as a vehicle for pro-Hungarian positions in the Czechoslovak political scene, receiving financial subsidies from Hungary and was also russophile.

In the 1924 and 1925 elections, the party contested on its own. In the 1924 by-election (when voters in Subcarpathia were able to elect delegates to the Czechoslovak parliament for the first time) the party got 21,161 votes, whilst in the 1925 election the party received 28,799 votes. Ahead of the 1929 Czechoslovak parliamentary election it formed an electoral bloc, the Russian National Bloc, together with the National Democrats and two minor Rusyn parties. The Russian National Bloc got 48,509 votes.

On November 26, 1930, Kurtyak presented a parliamentary motion for autonomy for Subcarpathian Rus'. The proposal gained support from the members of parliament of the German National Party, German National Socialist Workers Party and Hungarian parties.

After Kurtyak's death in 1933, his seat was taken over by the editor Andrej Bródy. In the 1935 Czechoslovak parliamentary election, the party contested in coalition with the Slovak National Party. The bloc did not pass the threshold to win any seats in parliament. It received 44,982 votes.
