= Russian National Party =

Russian National Party Русская Народная Партія
- Leader: Ivan Zhidovsky
- Founded: 1900
- Dissolved: 1939
- Headquarters: Lviv (1900-1914); Uzhhorod
- Newspaper: Narodnaja gazeta
- Ideology: Galician Russophilia; Regionalism
- National affiliation: Czechoslovak National Democracy (1924–1934)

The Russian National Party or Russian People's Party (Russian: Русская народная партия), founded in 1900, was a political party created by Western Ukrainian Russophiles in the Austro-Hungarian Kingdom of Galicia and Lodomeria to represent their interests. It represented radicalization among western Ukrainian Russophiles towards the end of the 19th and beginning of the twentieth centuries, promoting the standard literary Russian language without local linguistic features and conversion to Russian Orthodoxy. The Russian National Party had ties to Russian nationalist parties in the Russian Empire and received subsidies from the Russian government. Its members actively helped the Russian administration during its rule in western Ukraine during the first world war.

The party remained active in Czechoslovakia. RNP leader Anton Beskid became governor of Carpathian Ruthenia in 1924. RNP cooperated with the National Democrats and ran with them in 1924, 1925, in 1929 as part of the Russian National Bloc and in 1935.

In parliamentary elections, it was a member of the Ukrainian parliamentary association of Austria-Hungary.

- 1907 Cisleithanian legislative election
- 1911 Cisleithanian legislative election
