= Carpatho-Russian Labour Party of Small Peasants and Landless =

Carpatho-Russian Labour Party of Small Peasants and Landless Карпаторусская Трудовая Партия Малоземельных и Безземельных
- Leader: Andrey Gagatko
- Founded: 1919
- Dissolved: 1939?
- Newspaper: Russkaja zemlja
- Ideology: Popular socialism Narodnism; Agrarian socialism Galician Russophilia
- Political position: Centre-left

The Carpatho-Russian Labour Party of Small Peasants and Landless (Russian: Карпаторусская Трудовая Партия Малоземельных и Безземельных, Karpatorusskaja trudovaja partija malozemelnych i bezzemelnych, Czech: Karpatoruská trudová strana malorolníků a bezzemků) was a political party centered in Subcarpathian Rus' region, within the Second Czechoslovak Republic. It was founded in 1919. The party had a 'Greater Russian' orientation. It was led by Andrey Gagatko, who was elected in 1924 to the parliament. The party published Russkaja zemlja.

The party contested the 1924, 1925 and 1935 elections in electoral coalitions with the Czechoslovak National Social Party. In 1929, the party joined the Russian National Bloc and contested elections as part of an electoral bloc led by the Czechoslovak National Democrats.

The party advocated the separation of church and state. It was opposed to the Greek Catholic Church and supported Eastern Orthodoxy.

== Bibliography ==
- Němcová, Markéta (2000). "Strany rusínské menšiny" [Parties of the Ruthenian minority]. In Pavel Marek; et al. (eds.). Přehled politického stranictví na území českých zemí a Československa v letech 1861-1998 [Overview of political parties in the territory of the Czech lands and Czechoslovakia in the years 1861-1998] (in Czech). Olomouc: Katedra politologie a evropských studií FFUP. pp. 245–247. ISBN 80-86200-25-6.
