= Ruthenian Peasants Party =

Ruthenian Peasants Party Руська хліборобська партія
- Leader: Avgustyn Voloshyn
- Founded: 1920
- Dissolved: 1924 (as independent party)
- Succeeded by: Christian People's Party
- Headquarters: Uzhhorod
- Newspaper: Svoboda
- Ideology: Ukrainophilia; Conservatism; Christian democracy Christian nationalism
- Religion: Greek Catholicism
- National affiliation: Czechoslovak People's Party (1924–1938)

Ruthenian [Bread-producing] Peasants Party (Rusyn: Руська хліборобська партія, romanized: Ruska khliborobska partiya), also known as the Ruthenian National Christian Party, was a political party in Czechoslovakia. The party was founded in 1920. The most prominent personality in the party was Avgustyn Voloshyn, a renowned linguist from Uzhhorod. The party published the weekly newspaper Svoboda.

In 1923, the party changed name to Christian People's Party (Rusyn: Християнсько-народна партія, romanized: Christijansko-narodna partija). In 1924, the party merged into the Czechoslovak People's Party. The Czechoslovak People's Party kept the name "Christian People's Party" in Subcarpathian Rus'.
