= Užhorod electoral district (Czechoslovakia) =

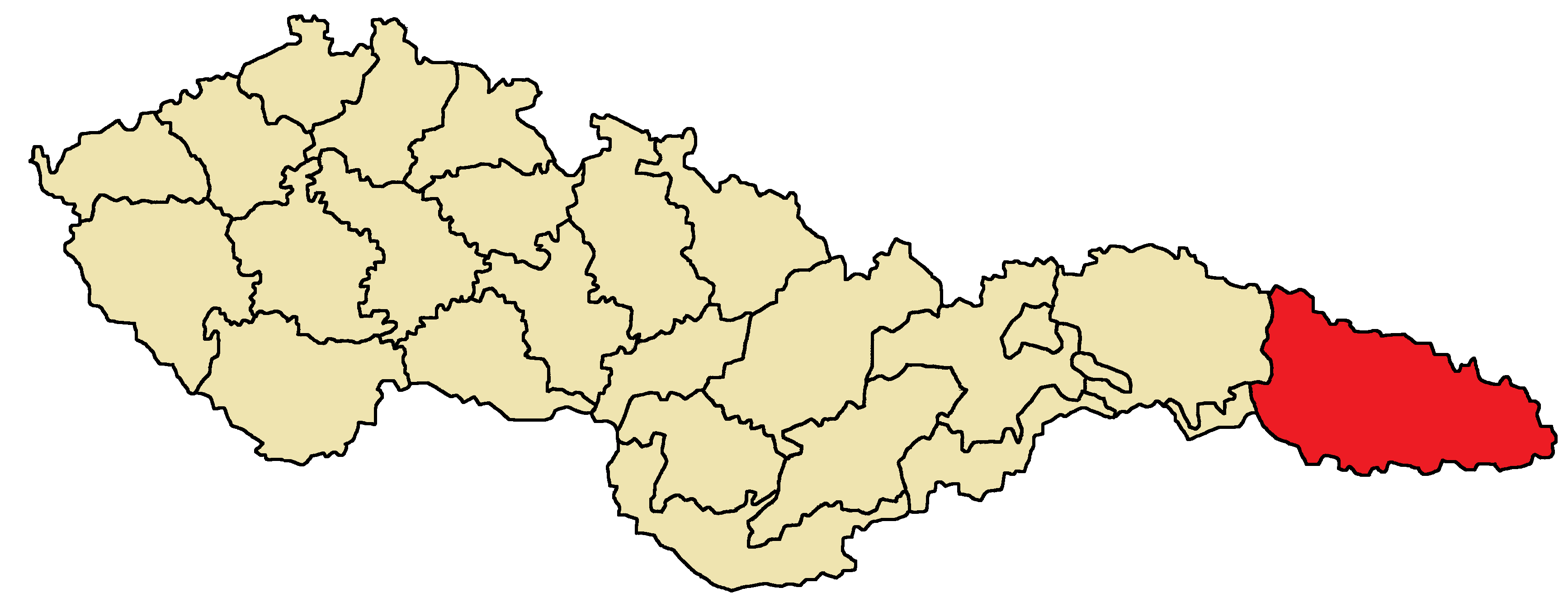
Užhorod electoral district

The Užhorod electoral district was a parliamentary constituency in Czechoslovakia for elections to the Chamber of Deputies and the Senate. The constituency covered all of Subcarpathian Ruthenia. The electoral district elected nine deputies in all elections held in the constituency during the First Czechoslovak Republic. The numbers of electors per each parliamentary seat was the highest in the Užhorod compared to all other electoral districts.

The constituency was created as the 23rd electoral district to the Chamber of Deputies for the areas of Subcarpathian Ruthenia by the Act of February 29, 1920. Amongst the Senate constituencies, the Užhorod electoral district carried the number 13. As of February 1921 Czechoslovak authorities estimated that the electoral district had a total population of 605,731. When the 22nd Těšín electoral district was abolished the Užhorod constituency was given the number 22.

Elections for deputies from Subcarpathian Ruthenia were held in 1924 (to the assembly elected in the Czechoslovak parliamentary election, 1920). The Communist Party emerged victorious in spite of the prevailing repressive climate, with arrests of their agitators and ban on communist meetings.

Between the 1924 vote and the 1925 election the borders of the constituency were changed.
