= 1925 Czechoslovak parliamentary election =

← 1920	15 November 1925	1929 →
- Chamber of Deputies
- All 300 seats in the Chamber of Deputies; 151 seats needed for a majority
Party	Leader	Vote %	Seats	+/–
RSZML	Antonín Švehla	13.66	45	+17
KSČ	Josef Haken	13.14	41	New
ČSL	Jan Šrámek	9.72	31	−2
ČSDSD	Antonín Hampl	8.88	29	−45
ČSNS–KTPMB	Václav Klofáč	8.57	28	+4
BdL	Franz Spina	8.04	24	+13
HSĽS	Andrej Hlinka	6.88	23	New
DSAP	Ludwig Czech	5.79	17	New
DCVP	Karl Hilgenreiner	4.42	13	+3
ČŽOS	Rudolf Mlčoch	4.02	13	+7
ČsND	Karel Kramář	4.00	13	−6
DNP		3.39	10	
DNSAP	Hans Knirsch	2.37	7	
OKSZP	Géza Szüllő	1.38	4	−1
AZS	Ivan Mockoš	0.50	1	New
PSL–PSPR	Jan Buzek	0.42	1	New
This lists parties that won seats. See the complete results below.
- Senate
- All 150 seats in the Senate; 76 seats needed for a majority
Party	Leader	Vote %	Seats	+/–
RSZML	Antonín Švehla	13.80	23	+9
KSČ	Josef Haken	12.70	20	New
ČSL	Jan Šrámek	10.14	16	−2
ČSDSD	Antonín Hampl	8.82	14	−27
ČSNS–KTPMB	Václav Klofáč	8.47	14	+4
BdL	Franz Spina	8.29	12	+6
HSĽS	Andrej Hlinka	6.84	12	New
DSAP	Ludwig Czech	5.96	9	−7
DCVP	Karl Hilgenreiner	4.74	7	+3
ČŽOS	Rudolf Mlčoch	4.22	6	+3
ČsND	Karel Kramář	4.20	7	−3
DNP		3.52	5	
DNSAP	Hans Knirsch	2.30	3	
OKSZP	Géza Szüllő	1.41	2	0
This lists parties that won seats. See the complete results below.
Chamber of Deputies results.
Prime Minister before	Prime Minister after
Antonín Švehla; RSZML	Antonín Švehla; RSZML

Parliamentary elections were held in Czechoslovakia on 15 November 1925. The result was a victory for the Republican Party of Farmers and Peasants, which won 45 seats in the Chamber of Deputies and 23 seats in the Senate. Voter turnout was 90.1% in the Chamber election and 77.3% for the Senate.

== Results ==
=== Chamber of Deputies ===
Party	Votes	%	Seats	+/–
Republican Party of Farmers and Peasants	970,940	13.66	45	+17
Communist Party of Czechoslovakia	934,223	13.14	41	New
Czechoslovak People's Party	691,095	9.72	31	–2
Czechoslovak Social Democratic Workers' Party	631,403	8.88	29	–45
Czechoslovak Socialist Party–Carpatho-Russian Labour Party	609,153	8.57	28	+4
Farmers' League–Zipser German Party–Hungarian National Party	571,765	8.04	24	+11
Hlinka's Slovak People's Party	489,111	6.88	23	New
German Social Democratic Workers' Party	411,365	5.79	17	+4
German Christian Social People's Party	314,438	4.42	13	+3
Czechoslovak Traders' Party	286,058	4.02	13	+7
Czechoslovak National Democracy	284,601	4.00	13	–6
German National Party	240,918	3.39	10	–
German National Socialist Workers' Party	168,354	2.37	7	–
Provincial Christian-Socialist Party	98,337	1.38	4	–1
Jewish Party	98,845	1.39	0	0
National Labour Party	97,938	1.38	0	–
Autonomous Agrarian Union	35,699	0.50	1	New
Slovak National Party	35,435	0.50	0	–12
Polish People's and Workers Union	29,884	0.42	1	New
Czechoslovak Agrarian and Conservative Party	27,768	0.39	0	New
West Slovak Christian Social Party	17,285	0.24	0	New
Jewish Economic Party	16,936	0.24	0	New
Czechoslovak Cottiers and Smallholders Party	14,434	0.20	0	–
German Free Social Party	11,344	0.16	0	New
Independent Communist Party	7,813	0.11	0	New
Regional Agrarian Party	4,546	0.06	0	New
Civic Party	4,240	0.06	0	New
Union of Christian Rural Peoples	2,389	0.03	0	New
Entrepreneur Party of Subcarpathian Ruthenia	1,094	0.02	0	New
Total	7,107,411	100.00	300	+19
Registered voters/turnout	7,885,822	–		
Source: Nohlen & Stöver, Statistical Office

=== Senate ===
Party	Votes	%	Seats	+/–
Republican Party of Farmers and Peasants	841,647	13.80	23	+9
Communist Party of Czechoslovakia	774,454	12.70	20	New
Czechoslovak People's Party	618,033	10.14	16	–2
Czechoslovak Social Democratic Workers' Party	537,470	8.82	14	–27
Czechoslovak Socialist Party–Carpatho-Russian Labour Party	516,250	8.47	14	+4
Farmers' League	505,597	8.29	12	+6
Hlinka's Slovak People's Party	417,206	6.84	12	New
German Social Democratic Workers' Party	363,310	5.96	9	–7
German Christian Social People's Party	289,055	4.74	7	+3
Czechoslovak Traders' Party	257,171	4.22	6	+3
Czechoslovak National Democracy	256,360	4.20	7	–3
German National Party	214,589	3.52	5	–
German National Socialist Workers' Party	139,945	2.30	3	–
Provincial Christian-Socialist Party	85,777	1.41	2	0
Jewish Party	51,513	0.84	0	0
National Labour Party	87,917	1.44	0	New
Slovak National Party	31,657	0.52	0	–6
Autonomous Agrarian Union	30,767	0.50	0	New
Czechoslovak Agrarian and Conservative Party	29,244	0.48	0	New
Polish People's and Workers Union	25,746	0.42	0	New
West Slovak Christian Social Party	17,521	0.29	0	New
Hungarian Agrarian Party of Slovakia	4,050	0.07	0	New
Entrepreneur Party of Subcarpathian Ruthenia	1,438	0.02	0	New
Total	6,096,717	100.00	150	+8
Registered voters/turnout	7,885,822	–		
Source: Statistical Office
