= Buzek =

Buzek (Czech feminine: Buzková) is a Czech and Polish surname. In Czech, the surname originated as a pet form of the given name Budislav. In Polish, as a pet form of the names starting with 'Budzi-': Budzisław, Budziwoj, etc., as well as of the name/nickname Buza. Notable people with the surname include:

- Agata Buzek (born 1976), Polish actress
- Hans Buzek (1938–2026), Austrian footballer
- Ivana Buzková (born 1985), Czech figure skater
- Jan Buzek (1874–1940), Polish politician
- Jerzy Buzek (born 1940), Polish politician
- Józef Buzek (1873–1936), Polish economist
- Petr Buzek (born 1977), Czech ice hockey player
- Petra Buzková (born 1965), Czech lawyer and politician
