= Budislav =

Budislav may refer to:

- Budislav (Svitavy District), a village in the Pardubice Region, Czech Republic
- Budislav (Tábor District), a village in the South Bohemian Region, Czech Republic
- Budislav (given name), Slavic masculine given name
