= Emanuel Chobot =

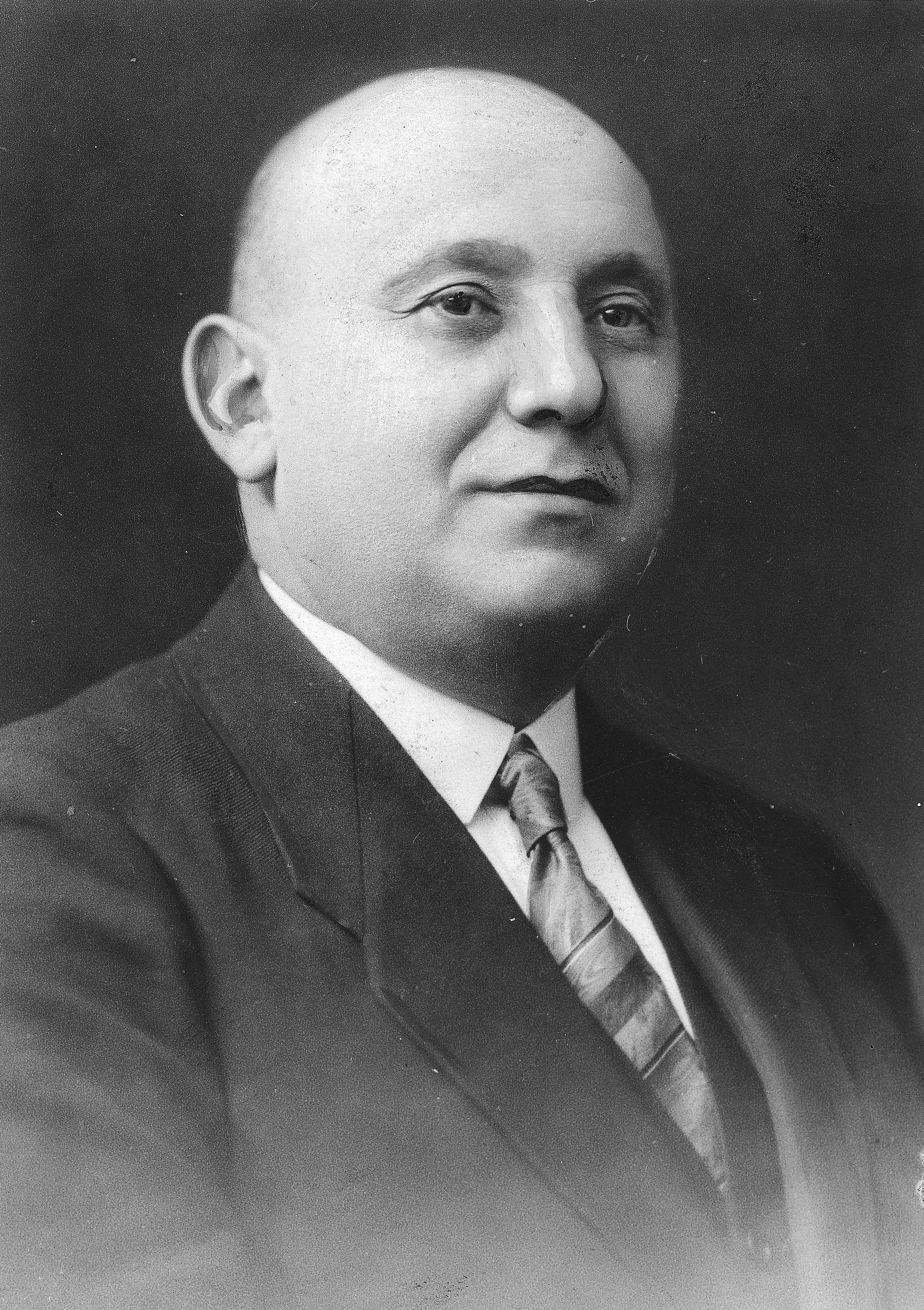
- Emanuel Chobot

Member of the National Assembly of Czechoslovakia
- In office 1929–1935

Personal details
- Born: 1 January 1881 Orłowa, Austria-Hungary
- Died: 7 June 1944 (aged 63) Ostrava, Nazi Germany
- Party: Polish Socialist Workers Party
- Occupation: Trade unionist

Emanuel Chobot (Polish pronunciation: [ɛmaˈnu.ɛl ˈxɔbɔt]; 1 January 1881 – 7 June 1944) was a Polish trade union activist and politician. He was the chairman of the Polish Socialist Workers Party, the social democratic party active amongst the Polish minority in Czechoslovakia. He was also the Director-General of the Consumers Association 'Gec' in Moravská Ostrava.

== Personal life ==
Chobot was the son of Józef Chobot (a coal miner by profession) and Barbara Uher. He graduated from primary school in Orłowa and worked as a coal miner in Łazy and (1895–1898) and Orłowa (1898–1907). He was married to Franziska Onderek. He lived at Nádražní 96, Moravská Ostrava.

== Trade unionism and cooperative movement ==
Chobot joined the miners movement. He was a member of the miners union 'Prokop' and the Miners' Union of Moravia, Silesia and Galicia (later transformed into the Miners' Union of Austria). Chobot led the Třinec branch of the Union of Metalworkers. Chobot was also active in the cooperative movement. He served as deputy chairman of the District Health Fund in Cieszyn in 1910–1912. From 1912 he led the Ostrava branch of the Austrian consumers' cooperative movement. During the First World War, he led the Polish Workers Association 'Siła'.

== Parliamentarian ==
Chobot was elected Member of Parliament in the 1929 Czechoslovak parliamentary election, representing the electoral coalition of the Polish minority parties and the Jewish Party. Chobot was one of two Polish parliamentarians elected on behalf of this coalition, the other being Jan Buzek of the Polish People's Party.
