= 1931 Polish census =

Poland's second census during the interwar period

Polish census of 1931
- Mother tongue in Poland, based on 1931 census
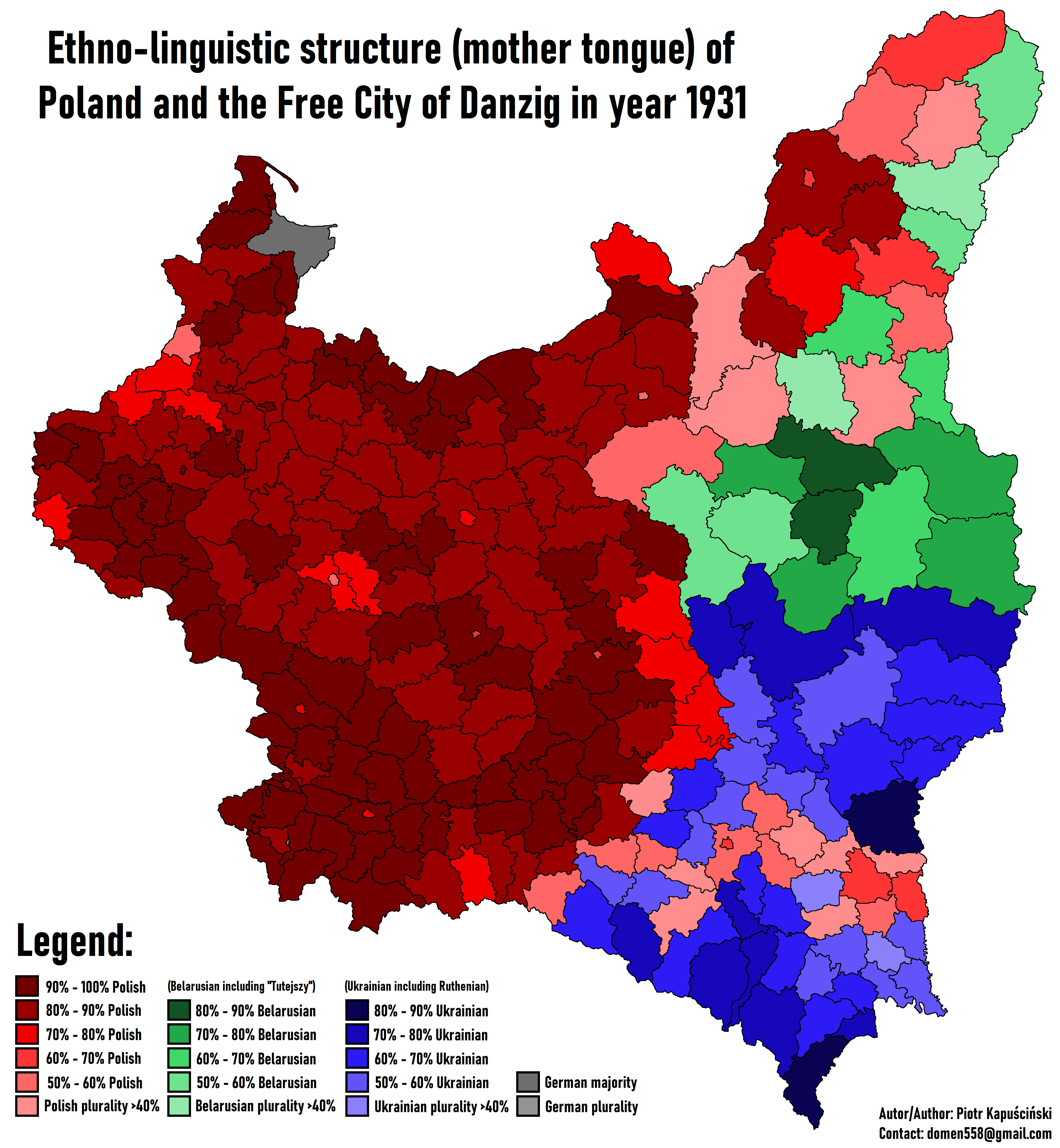
- Media related to Polish census of 1931 at Wikimedia Commons

The Polish census of 1931 or Second General Census in Poland (Polish: Drugi Powszechny Spis Ludności) was the second census taken in sovereign Poland during the interwar period, performed on December 9, 1931, by the Main Bureau of Statistics. It established that Poland's population amounted to almost 32 million people (over 6 million more than in the previous census of 1921).

The census was organised following the rules established by an act of the Polish Parliament of October 14, 1931. In contrast to the earlier census of 1921, the 1931 census did not count national minorities and detailed information on types of farms, leaving only the question of the overall area of land owned by the citizen. The part related to education was expanded to include questions of ability to read and write.

The results of the census were being published in 39 volumes between 1936 and 1939 in a publishing series titled "Statistics of Poland". A list of all settlements in Poland was also prepared, but only a part related to Wilno Voivodeship was published.

== Population by mother tongue and faith ==
The population was categorized by mother tongue i.e. the primary language in the following categories: Polish, Ukrainian, Ruthenian (i.e. Rusyn), Belarusian, Russian, Lithuanian, German, Yiddish, Hebrew, Local, Other, and Not Declared. The category "Local" (Polish: tutejszy) versus "Other" (Polish: inny) was hotly debated after the fact, because a number of significant languages were not on the list, e.g., Romani, Armenian, and/or what might constitute transitional language e.g. Polesian, Kashubian and others. Neither the 1921 Polish Census, nor the 1910 Austrian Galician Census had surveyed the Ukrainian language, which was novel for a census in the region.

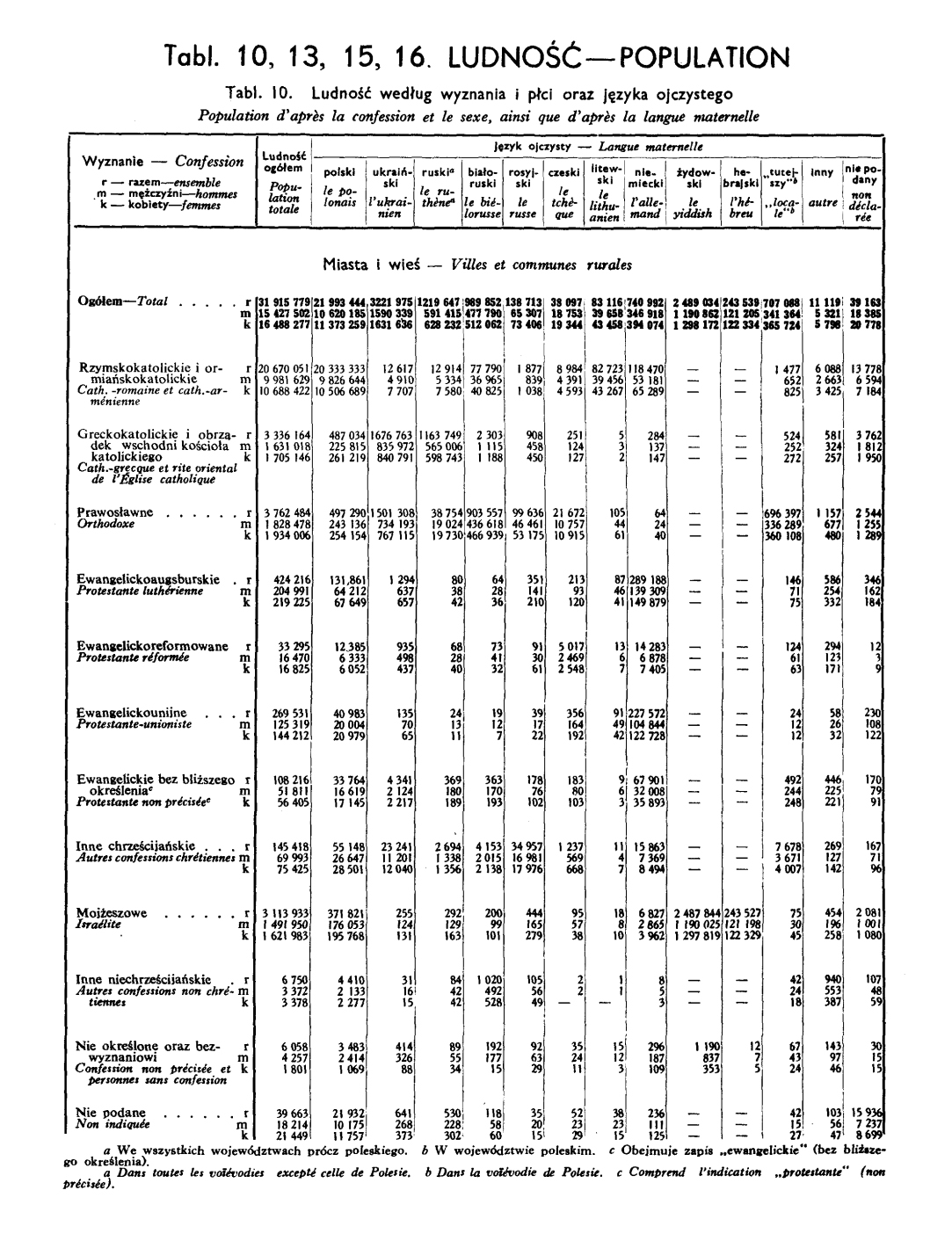
1931 Census of Poland Table 10 "Ludnosc- Population", pg.15

Population by first language
1. Total: 31,915,779
2. Polish: 21,993,444
3. Ukrainian: 3,221,975
4. Ruthenian: 1,219,647
5. Belarusian: 989,852
6. Russian: 138,713
7. Czech: 38,097
8. Lithuanian: 83,116
9. German: 740,992
10. Yiddish: 2,489,034
11. Hebrew: 243,539
12. Local: 707,088
13. Other: 11,119
14. Not Declared: 39,163

Population by faith
1. Total: 31,915,779
2. Roman Catholic: 20,670,051
3. Greco Catholic: 3,336,164
4. Orthodox: 3,762,484
5. Protestant Lutheran: 424,216
6. Protestant Reformed: 33,295
7. Protestant Unite: 269,531
8. Protestant (gen.): 108,216
9. Other Christian: 145,418
10. Judaism: 3,113,933
11. Other non-Christian: 6,750
12. Non-believers: 6,058
13. Not Declared: 39,663

The population was also categorized by religion. Most Jews spoke Yiddish, and many spoke Polish and Russian. These were categorized as two groups. Statistical differences existed between Ruthenians and Ukrainians. Ruthenians nationwide were 96.5% Greek Catholic but only 3.2% Orthodox, compared to Ukrainians who were almost equally divided at 52.4% Greek Catholic and 46.6% Orthodox. Most Ruthenian speakers lived in Lwow, Tarnopol and Stanislaw provinces. In Tarnopol and Stanislaw provinces, the majority of the population was Greek Catholic.

=== By cities ===
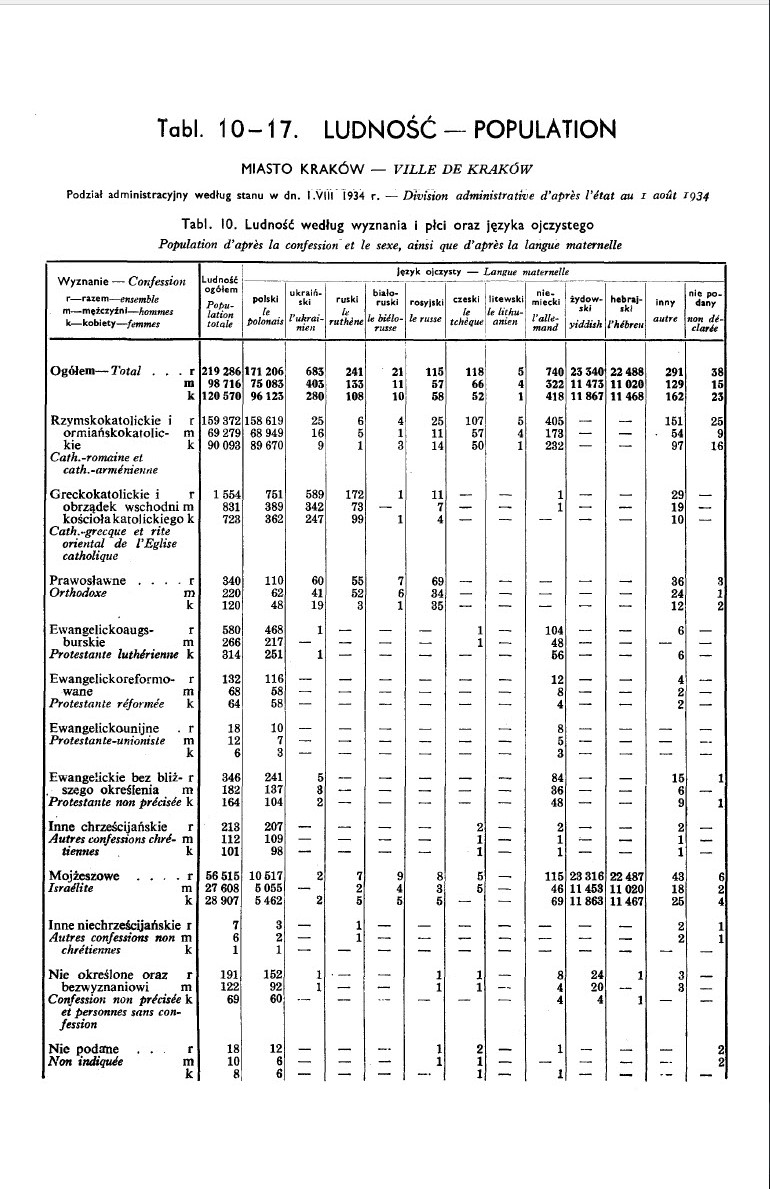
1931 Census of Poland, Miasto Kraków, table 10 Ludnosc-Population-pg.11

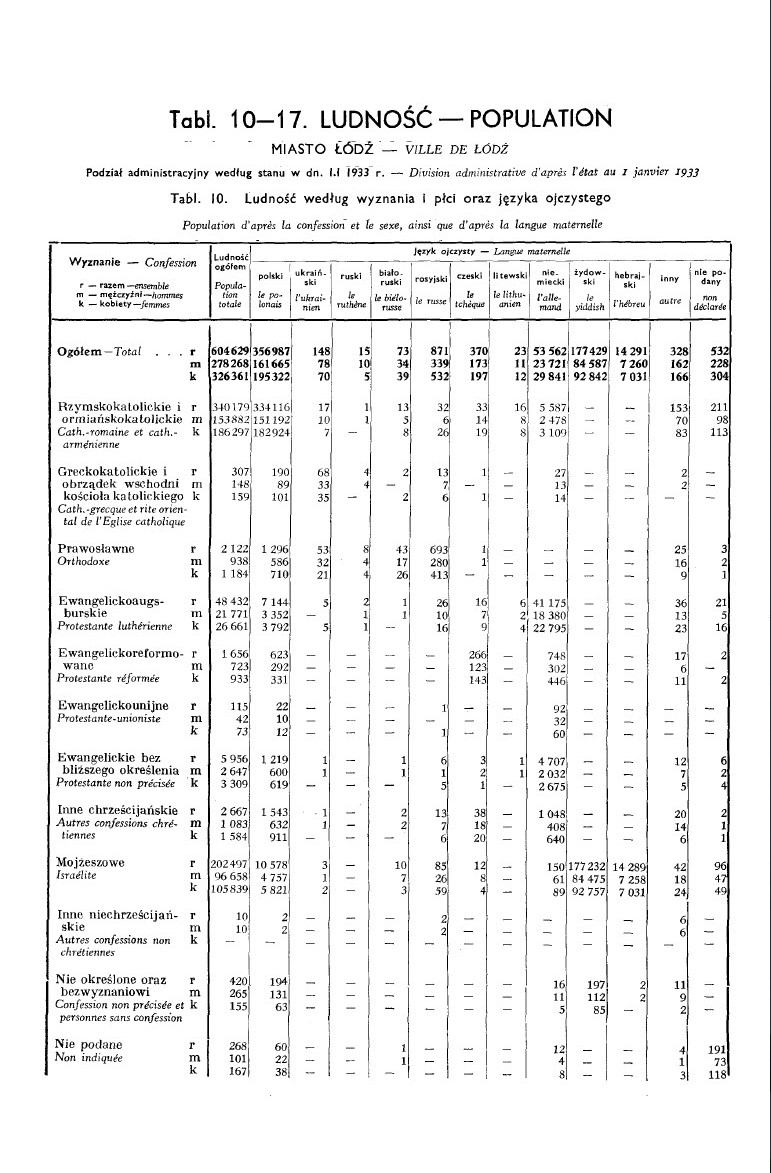
1931 Census of Poland, Miasto Łódź, table 10 Ludnosc-Population-pg.14

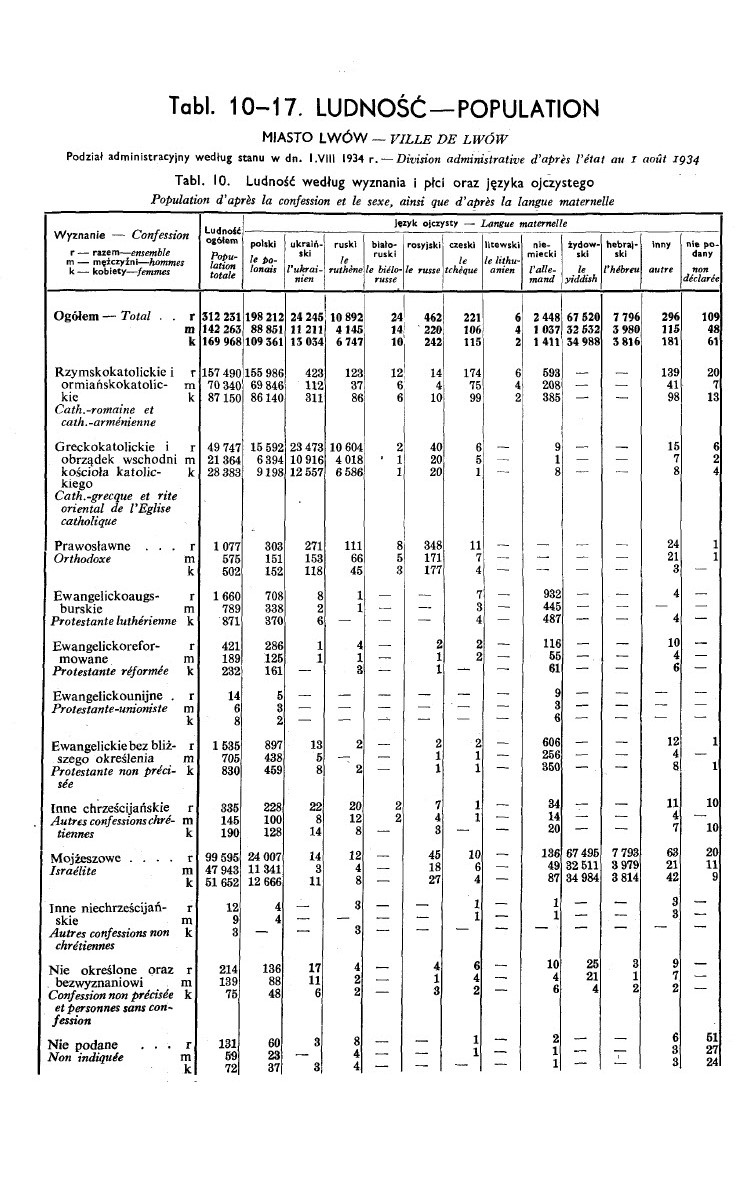
1931 Census of Poland, Miasto Lwow, table 10 Ludnosc-Population-pg.11

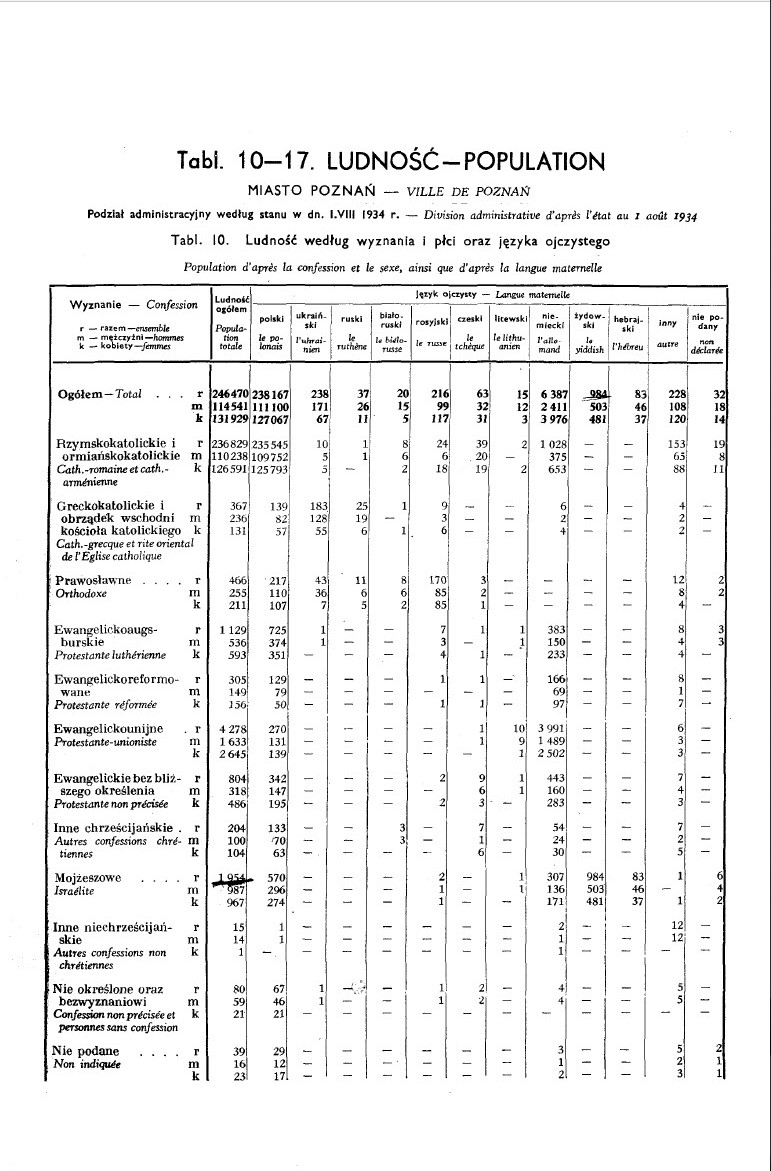
1931 Census of Poland, Miasto Poznań, table 10 Ludnosc-Population-pg.11

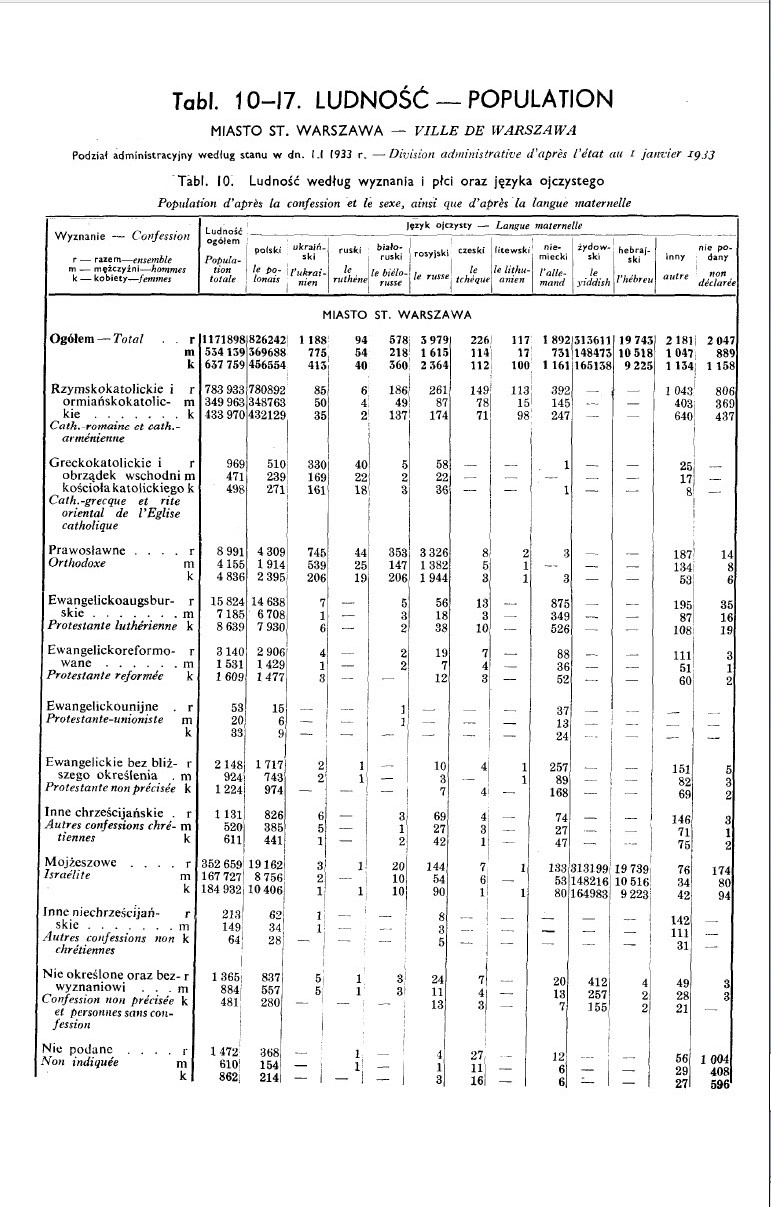
1931 Census of Poland, Miasto Warsaw, table 10 Ludnosc-Population-pg.18

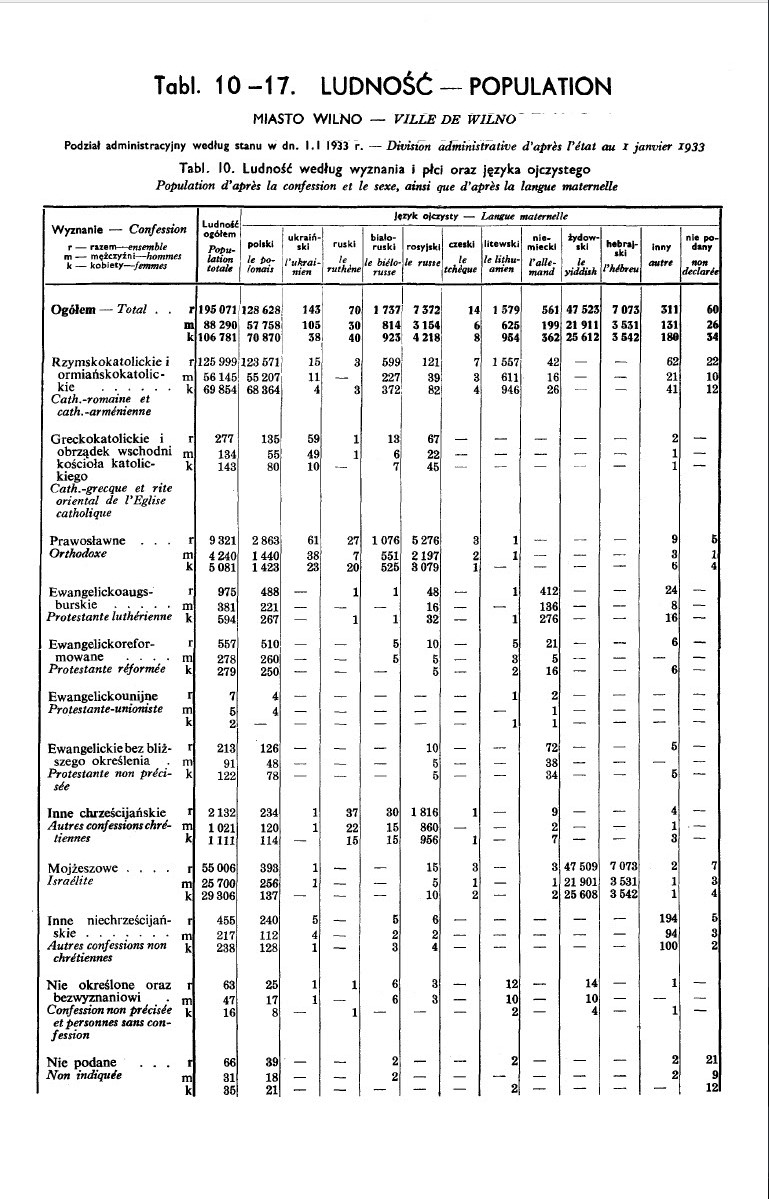
1931 Census of Poland, Miasto Wilno, table 10 Ludnosc-Population-pg.11

=== By voivodships ===
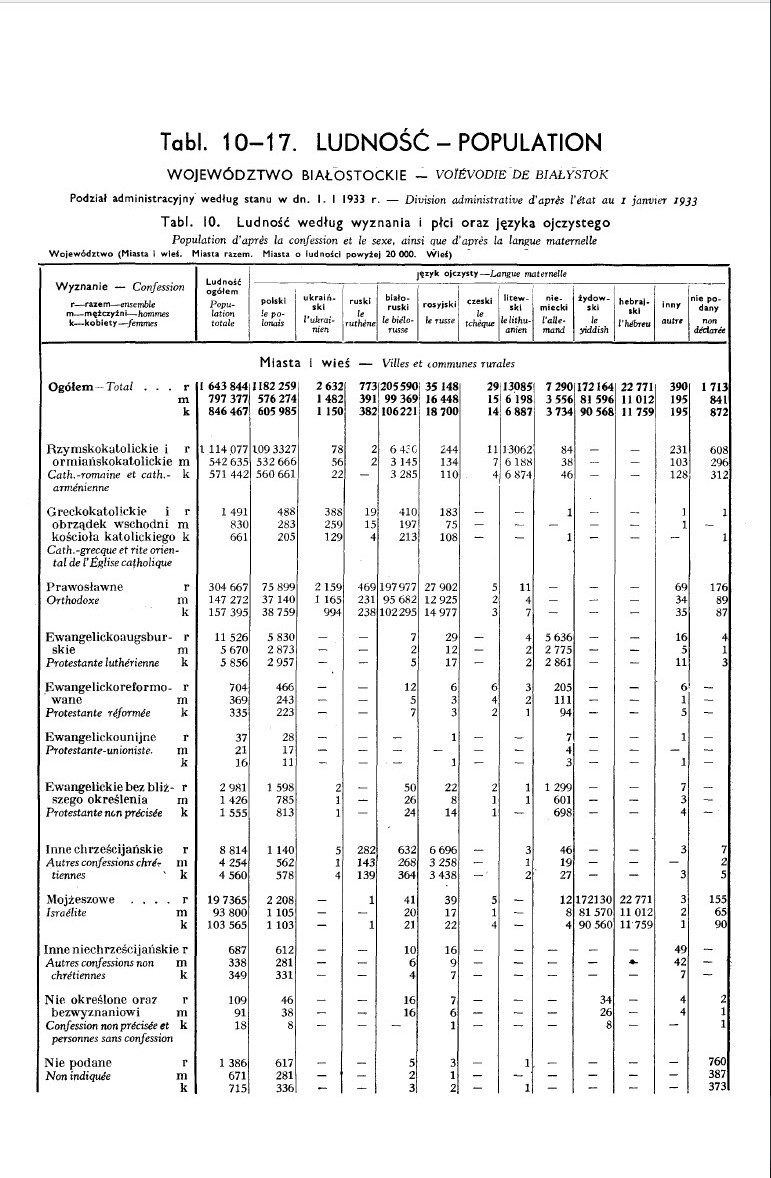
1931 Census of Poland, Bialostock Voivodship, table 10 Ludnosc-Population-pg.23

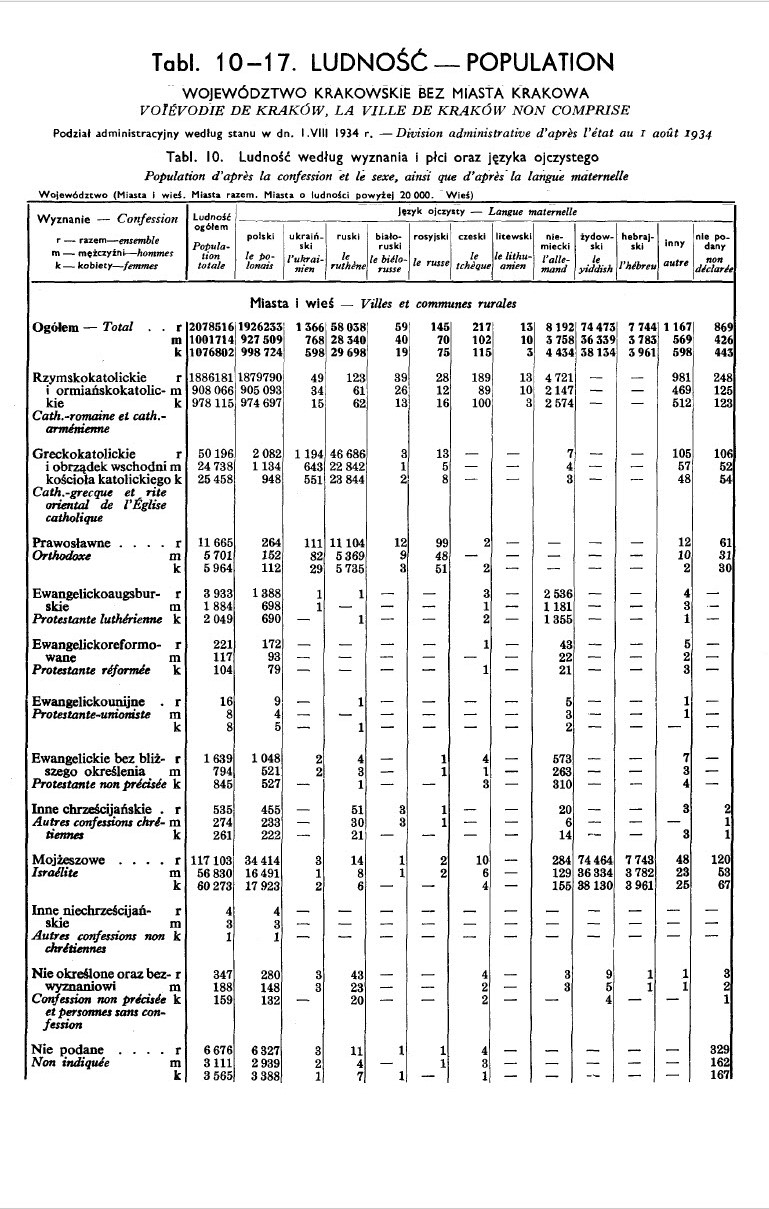
1931 Census of Poland, Kraków Voivodship, table 10 Ludnosc-Population-pg.26

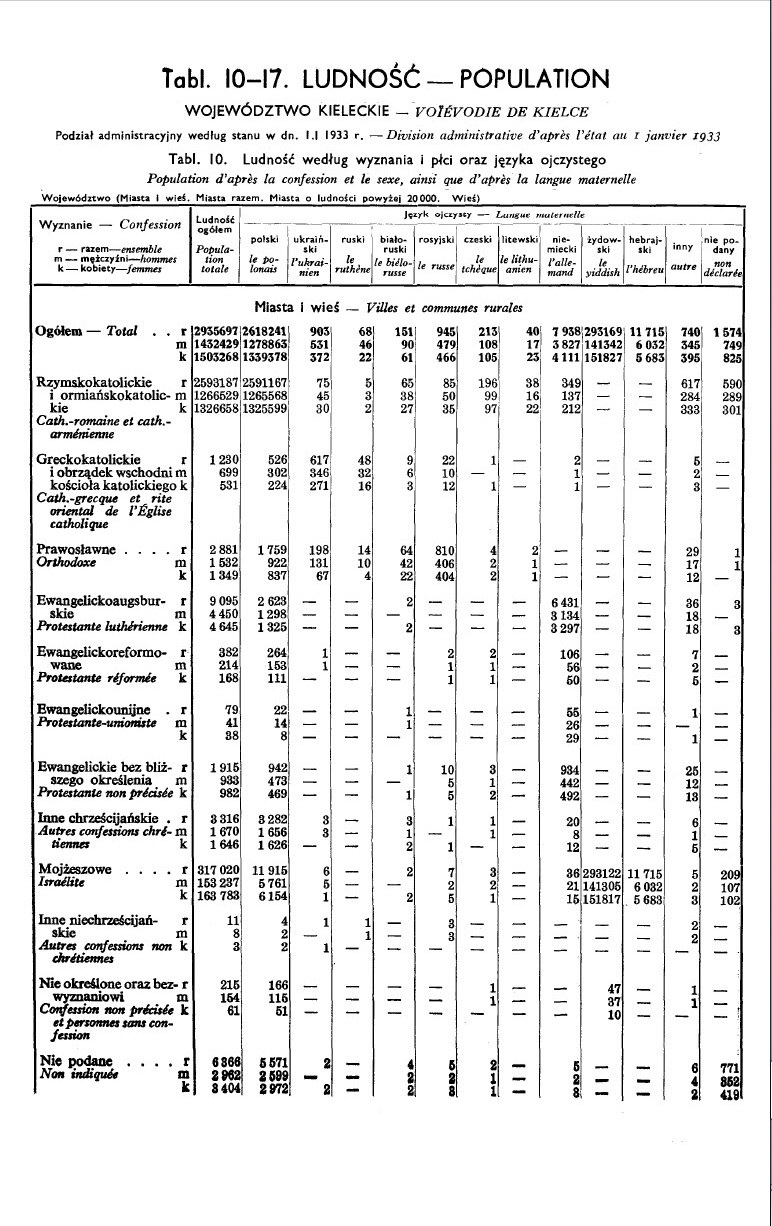
1931 Census of Poland, Kielce Voivodship, table 10 Ludnosc-Population-pg.28

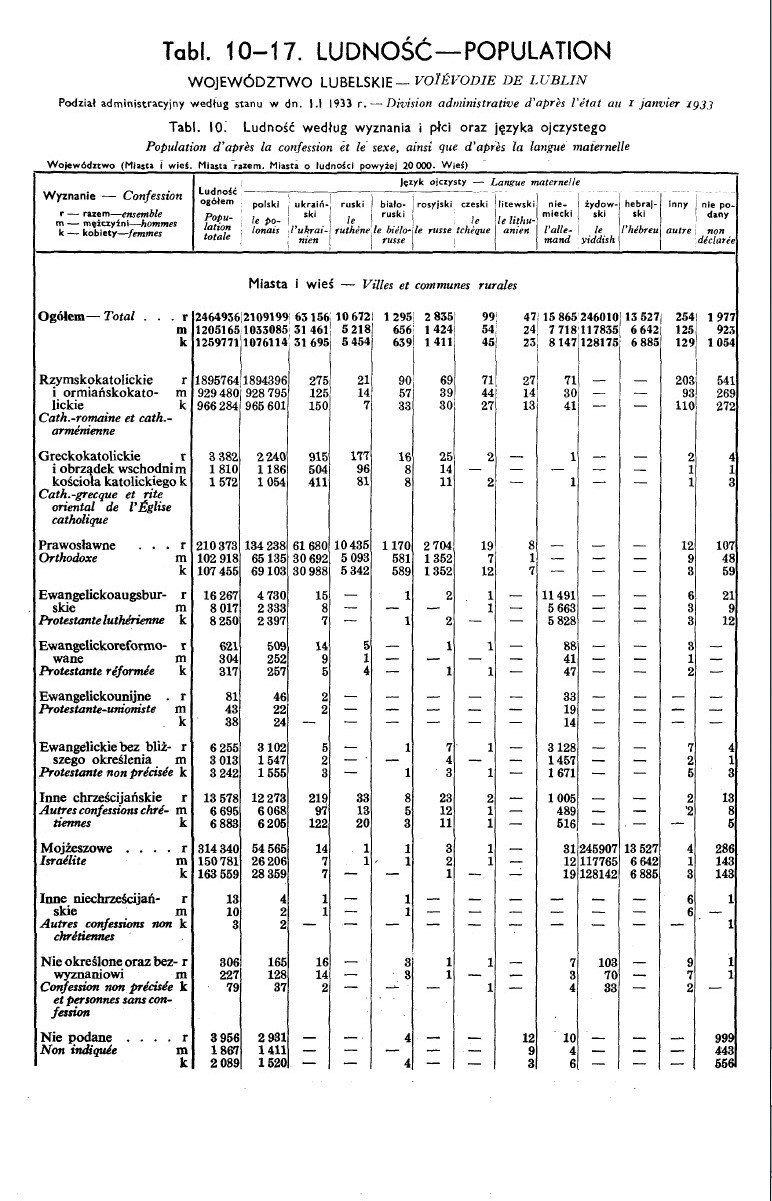
1931 Census of Poland, Lublin Voivodship, table 10 Ludnosc-Population-pg.26

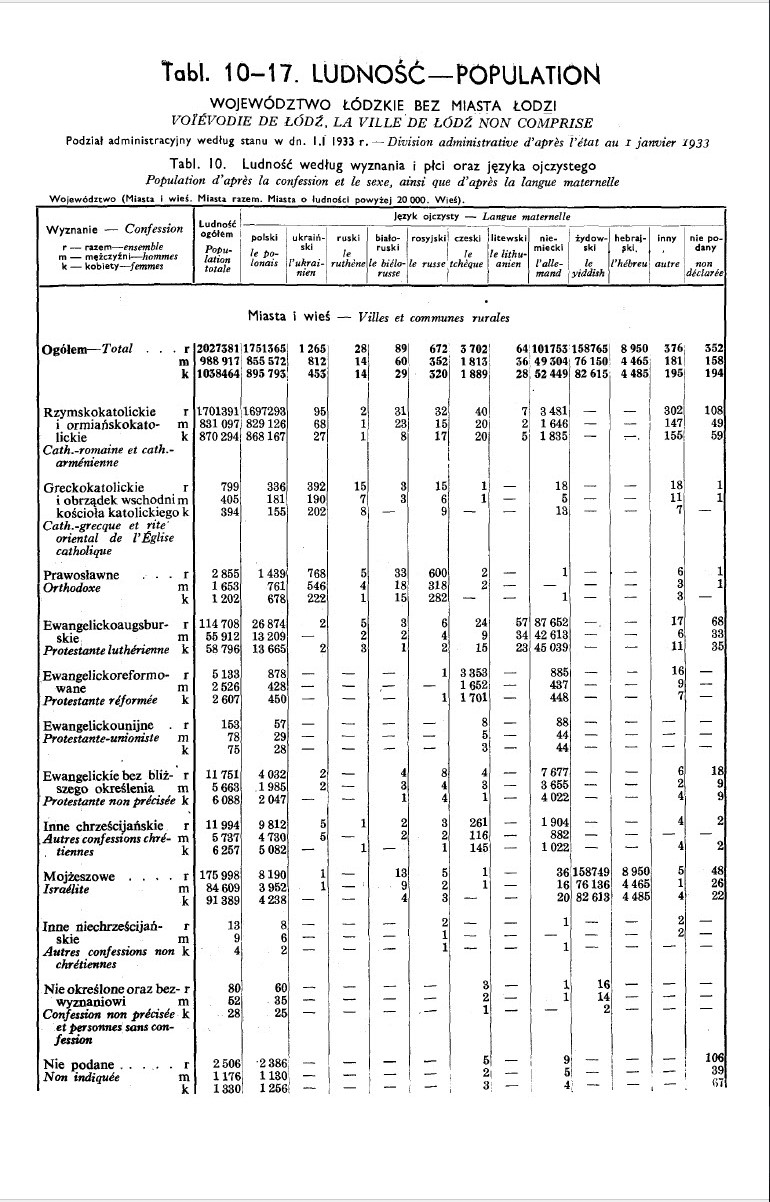
1931 Census of Poland, Łódź Voivodship, table 10 Ludnosc-Population-pg.23

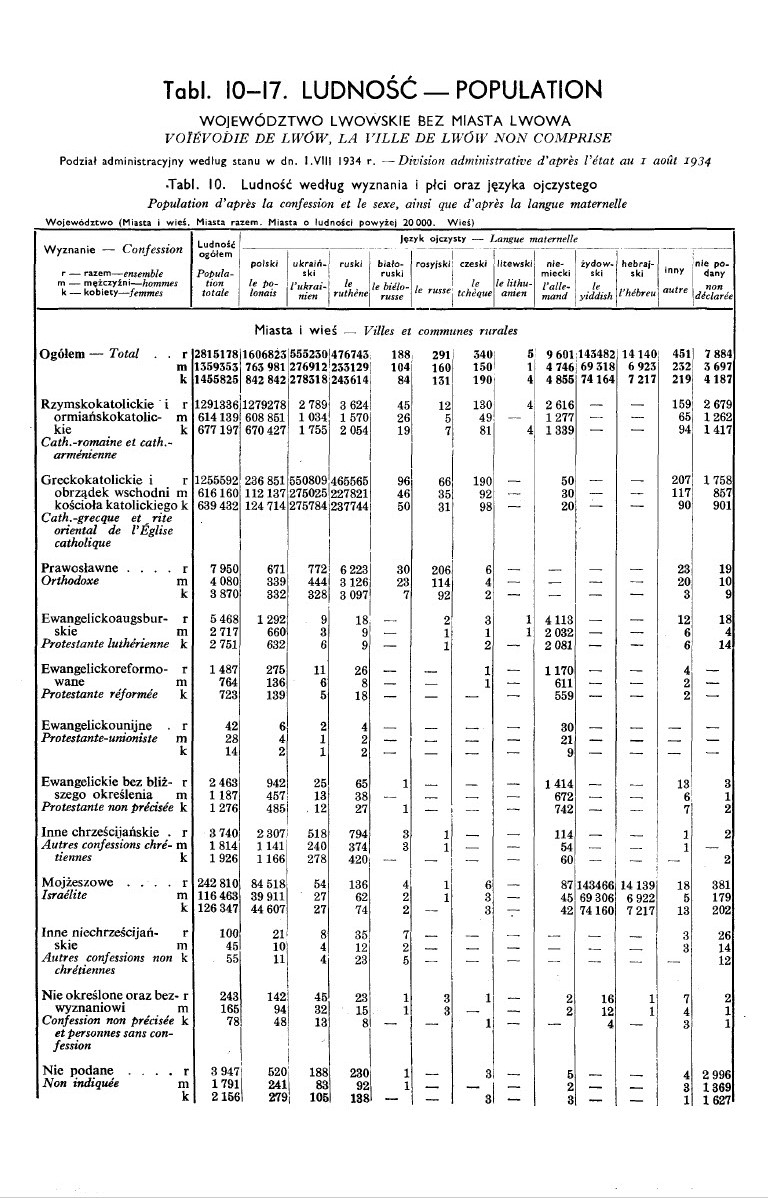
1931 Census of Poland, Lwow Voivodship, table 10 Ludnosc-Population-pg.32

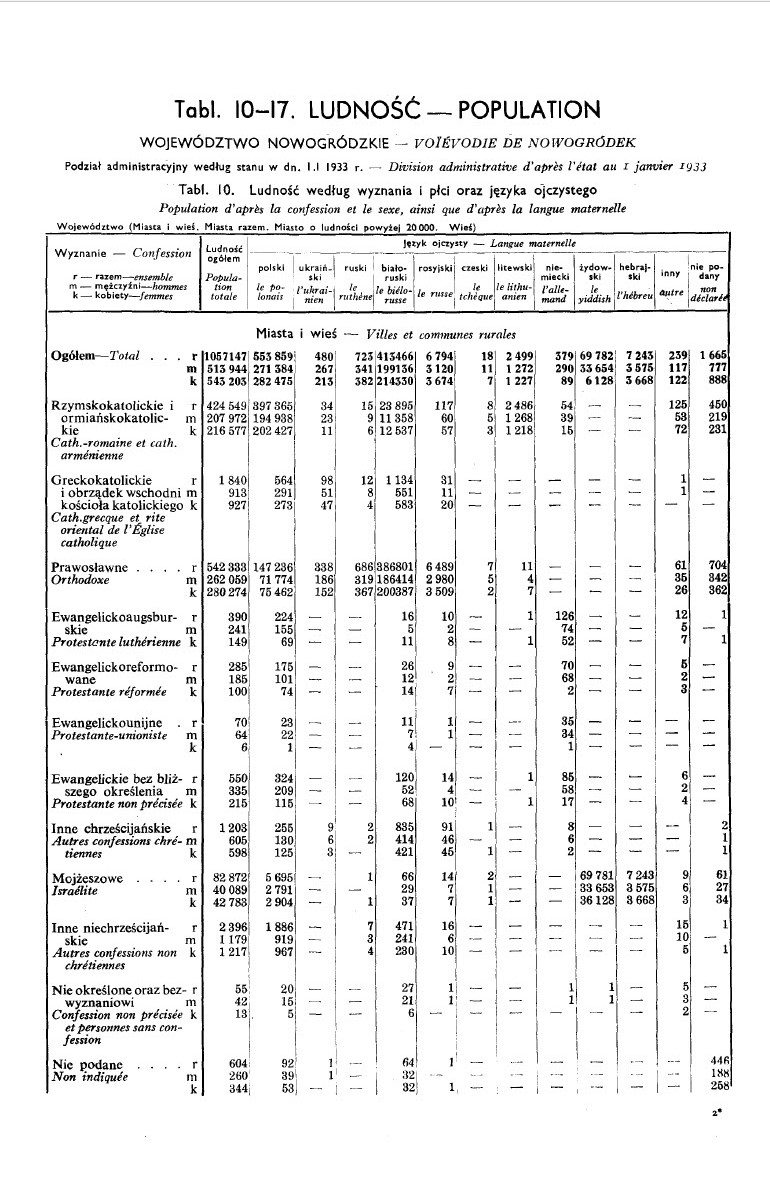
1931 Census of Poland, Nowogrodek Voivodship, table 10 Ludnosc-Population-pg.19

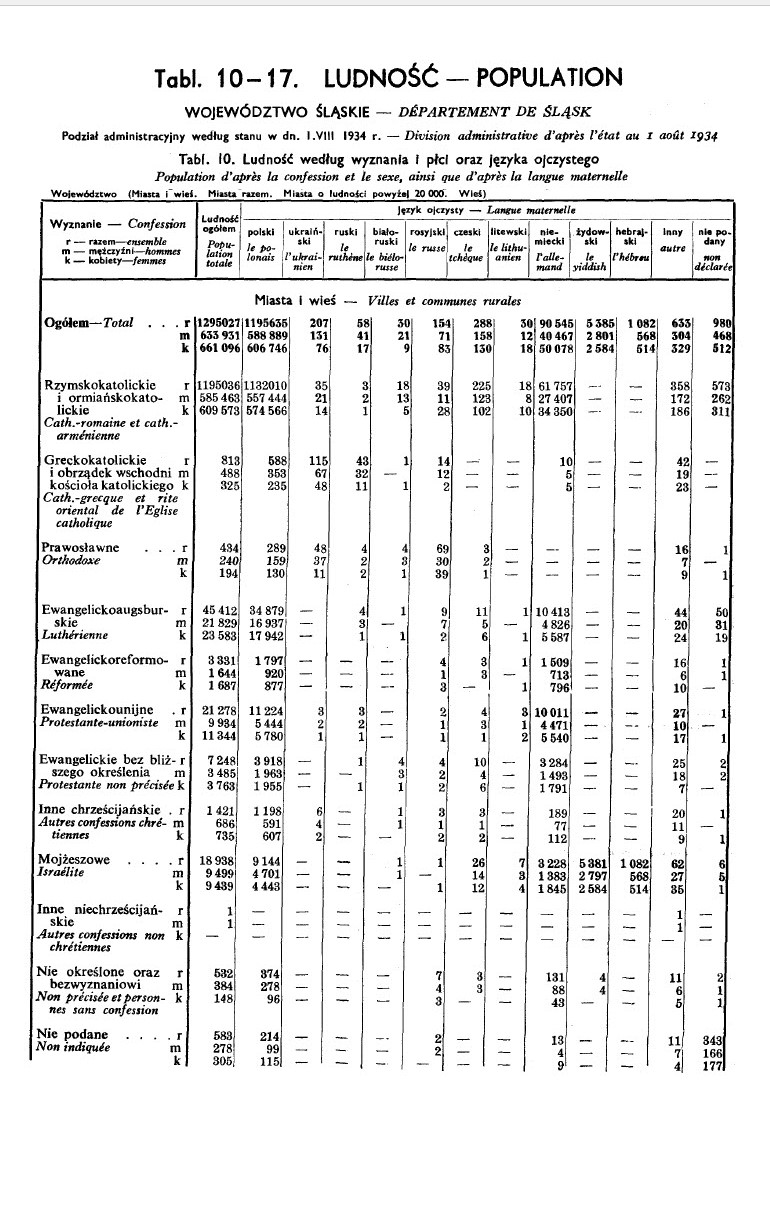
1931 Census of Poland, Slaskie Voivodship, table 10 Ludnosc-Population-pg.20

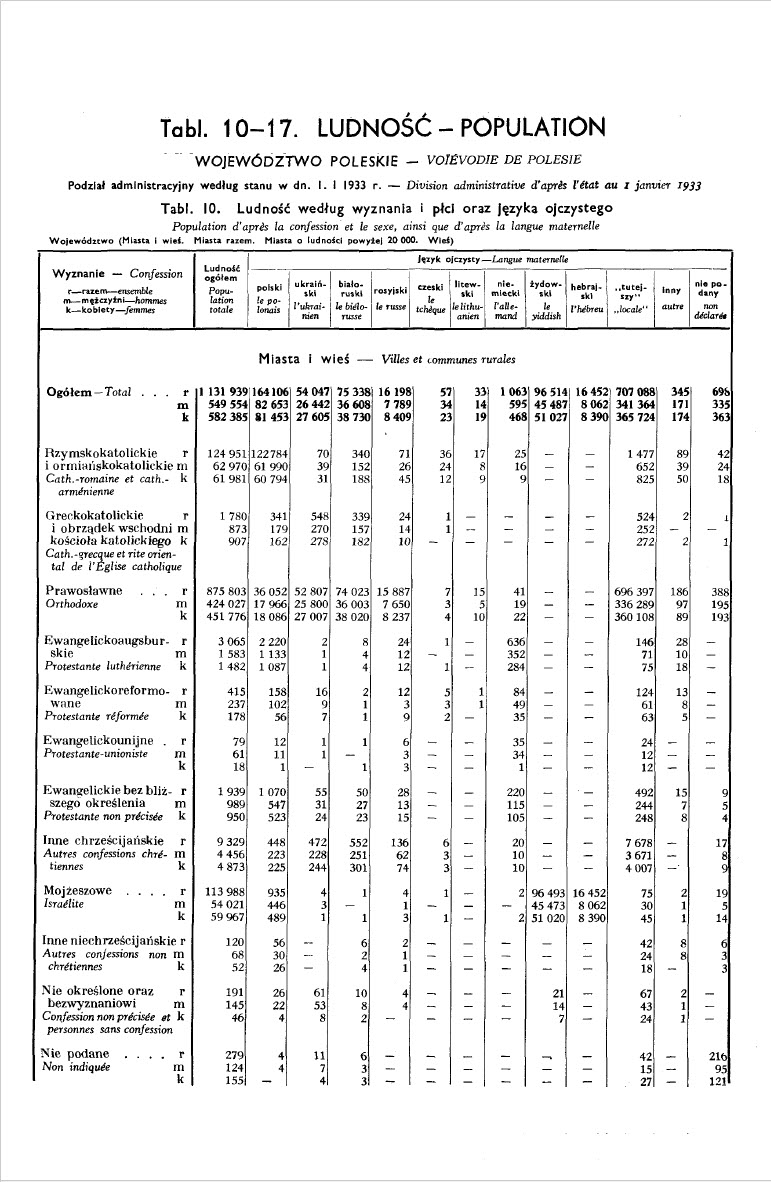
1931 Census of Poland, Polesie Voivodship, table 10 Ludnosc-Population-pg.20

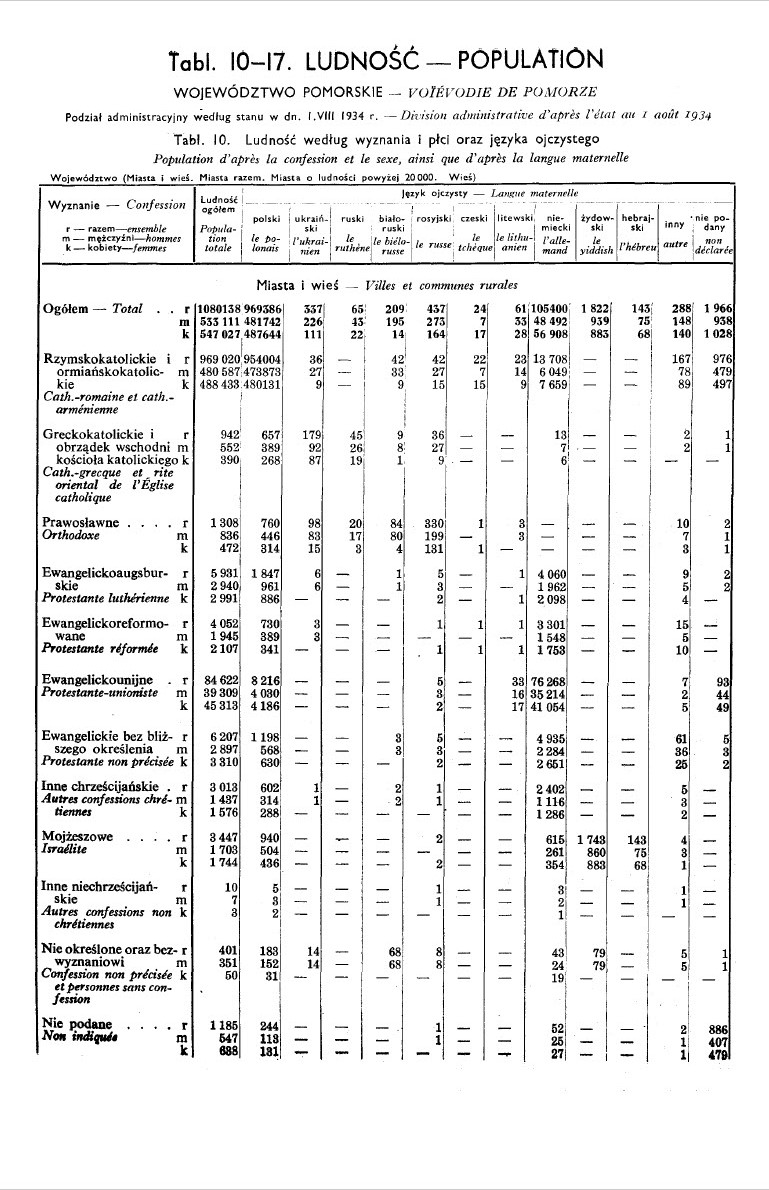
1931 Census of Poland, Pomorski Voivodship, table 10 Ludnosc-Population-pg.26

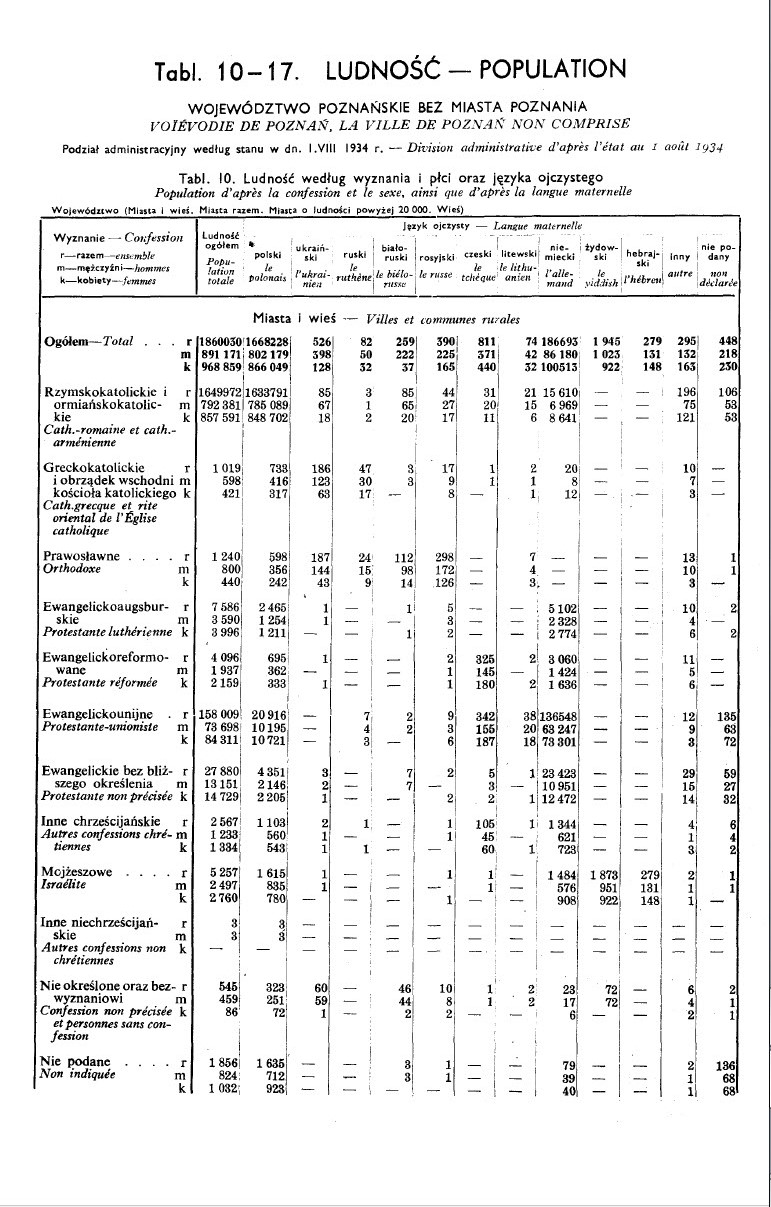
1931 Census of Poland, Poznań Voivodship, table 10 Ludnosc-Population-pg.32

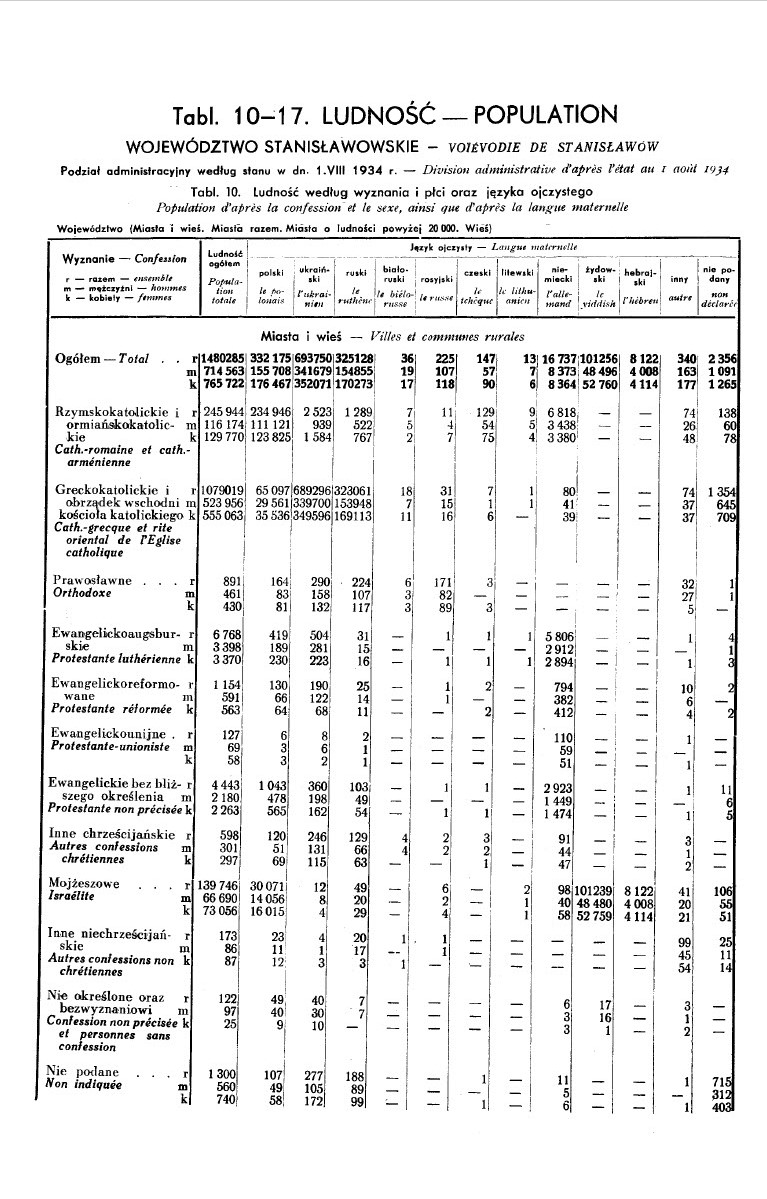
1931 Census of Poland, Stanislaw Voivodship, table 10 Ludnosc-Population-pg.22

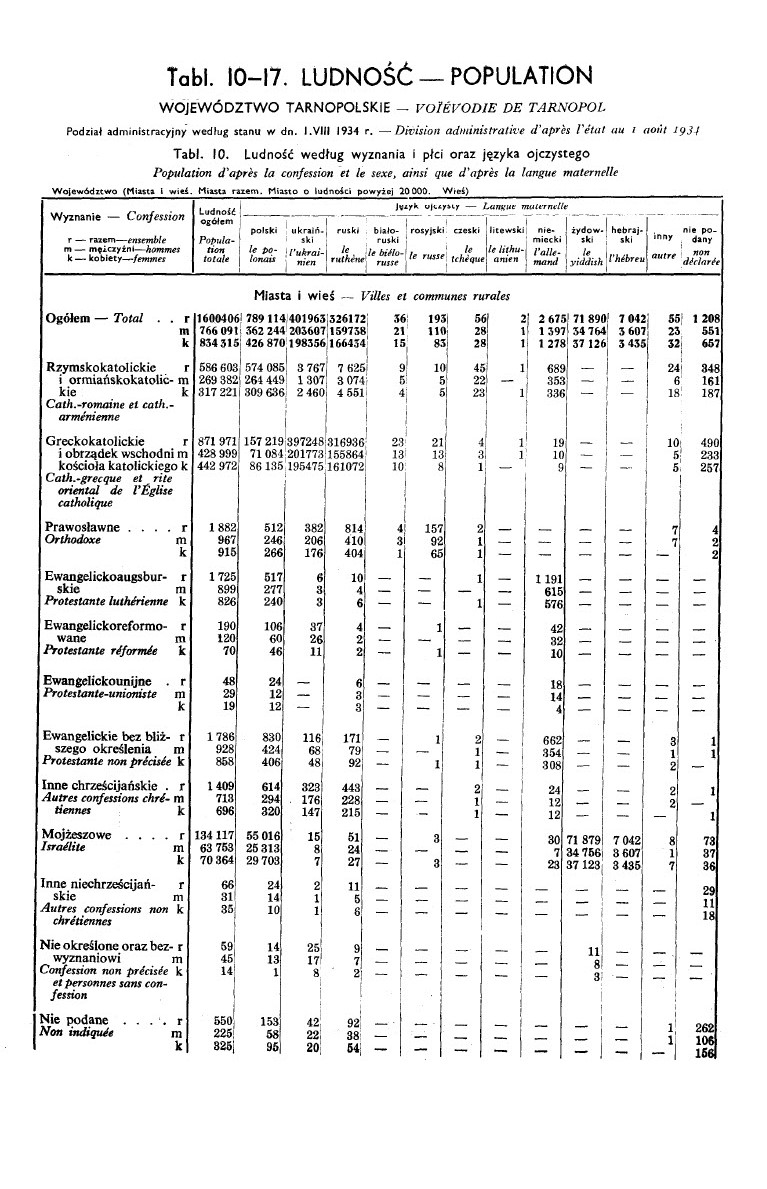
1931 Census of Poland, Tarnopol Voivodship, table 10 Ludnosc-Population-pg.26

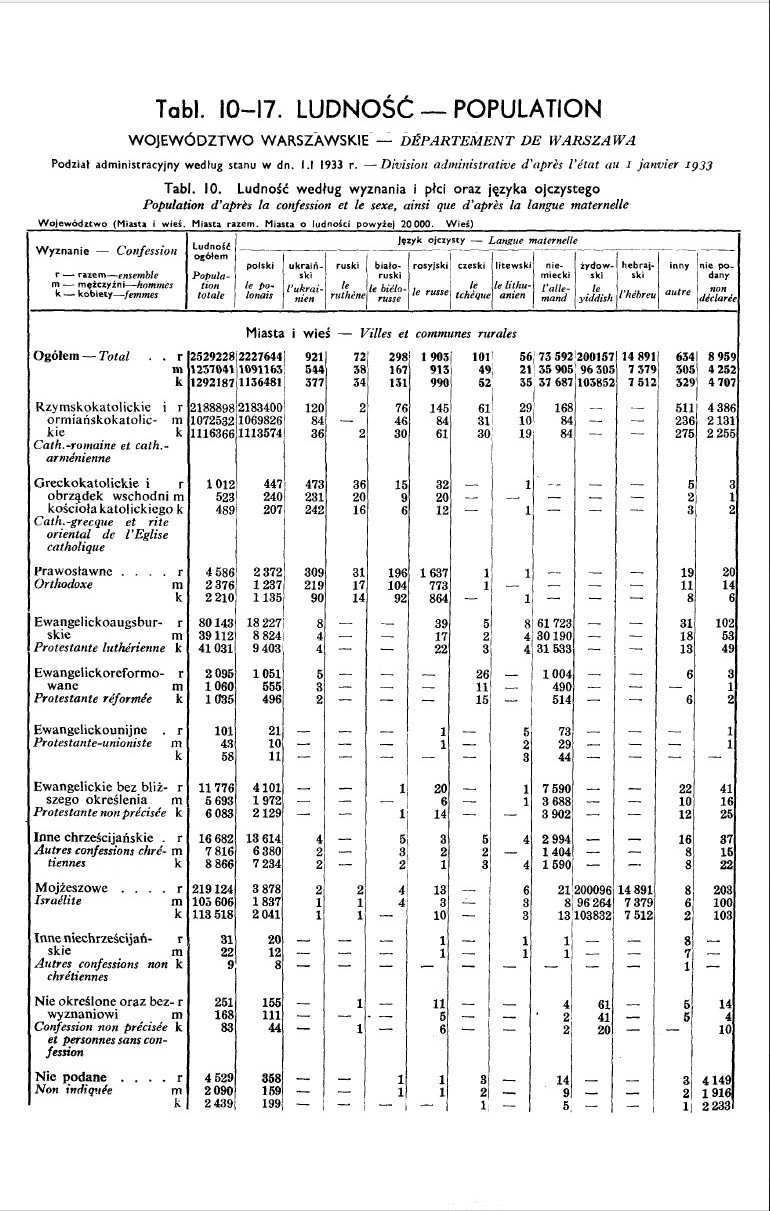
1931 Census of Poland, Warsaw Voivodship, table 10 Ludnosc-Population-pg.30

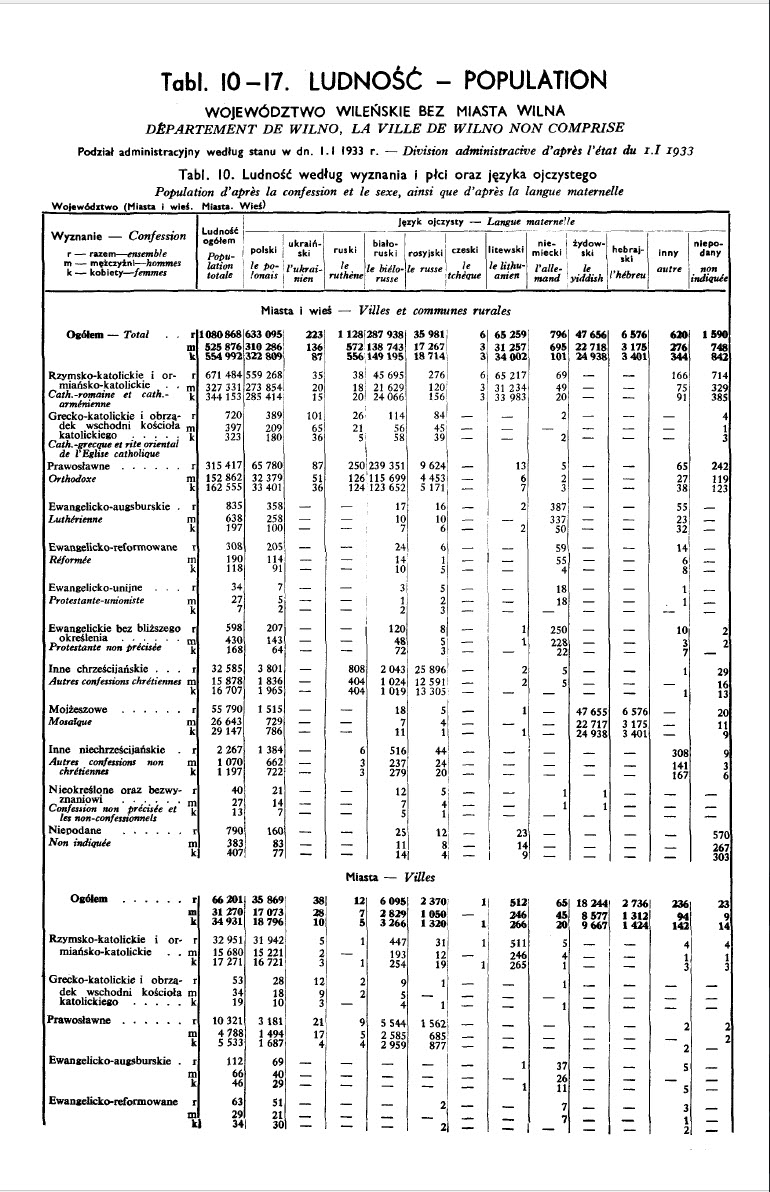
1931 Census of Poland, Wilno Voivodship, table 10 Ludnosc-Population-pg.10

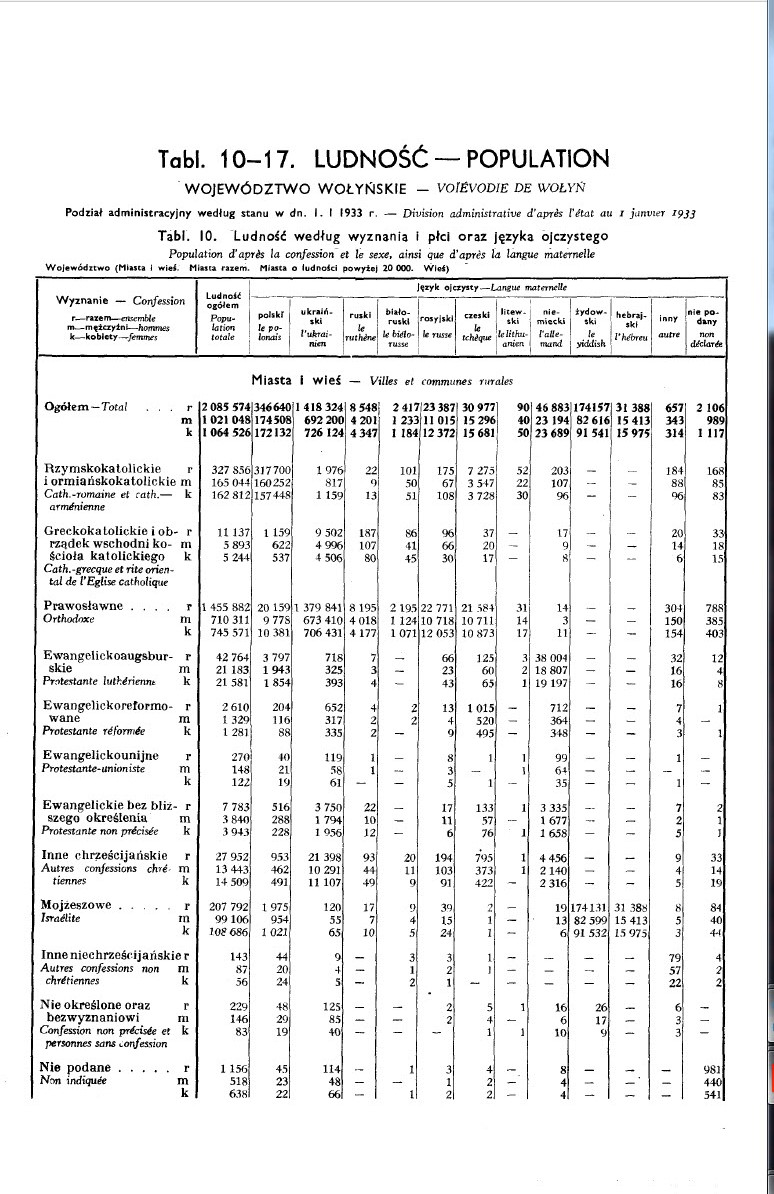
1931 Census of Poland, Wolyn Voivodship, table 10 Ludnosc-Population-pg.22

=== Mother tongue question ===
Polish-speakers in Poland in 1931.

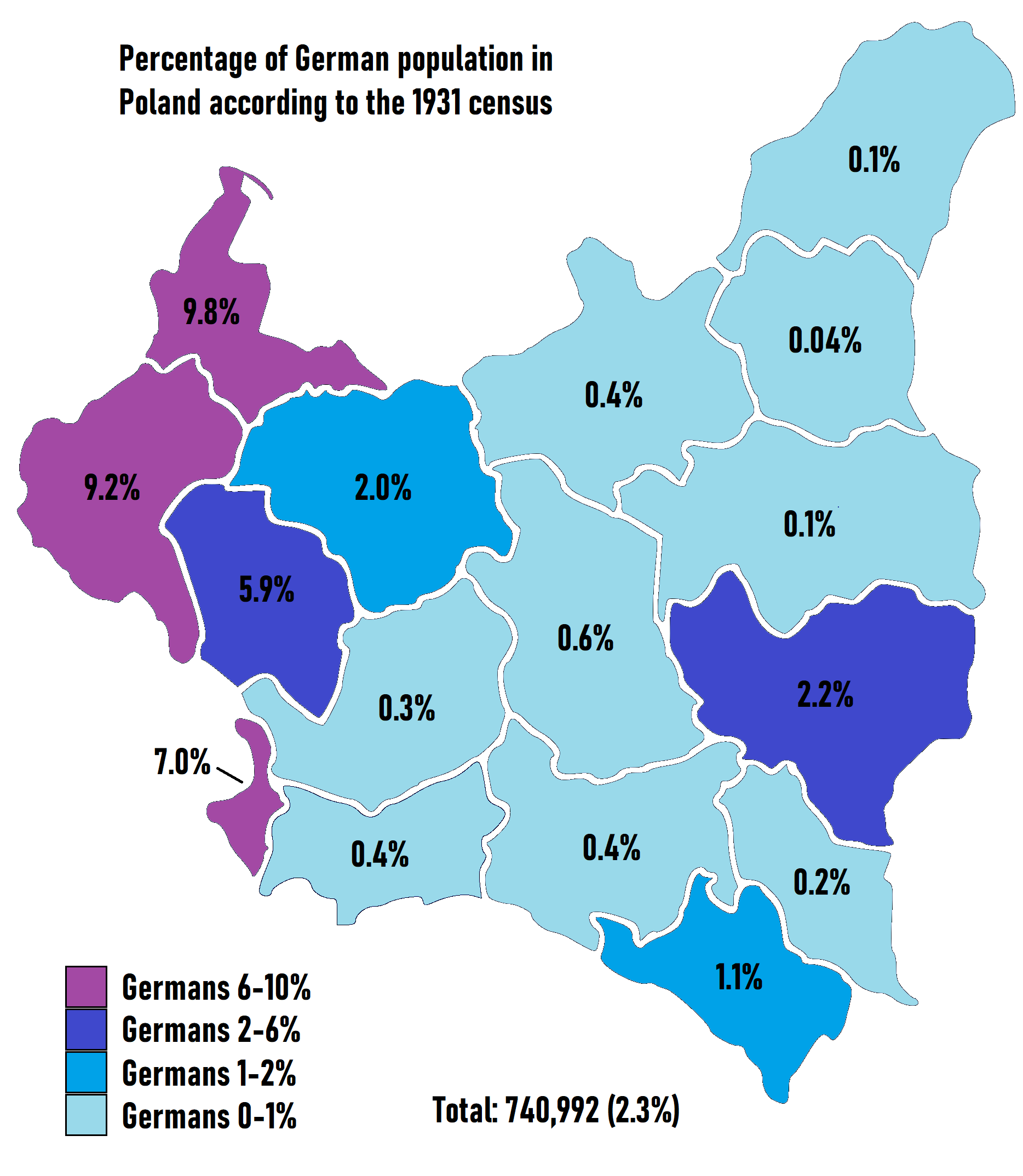
Germans in Poland in 1931.

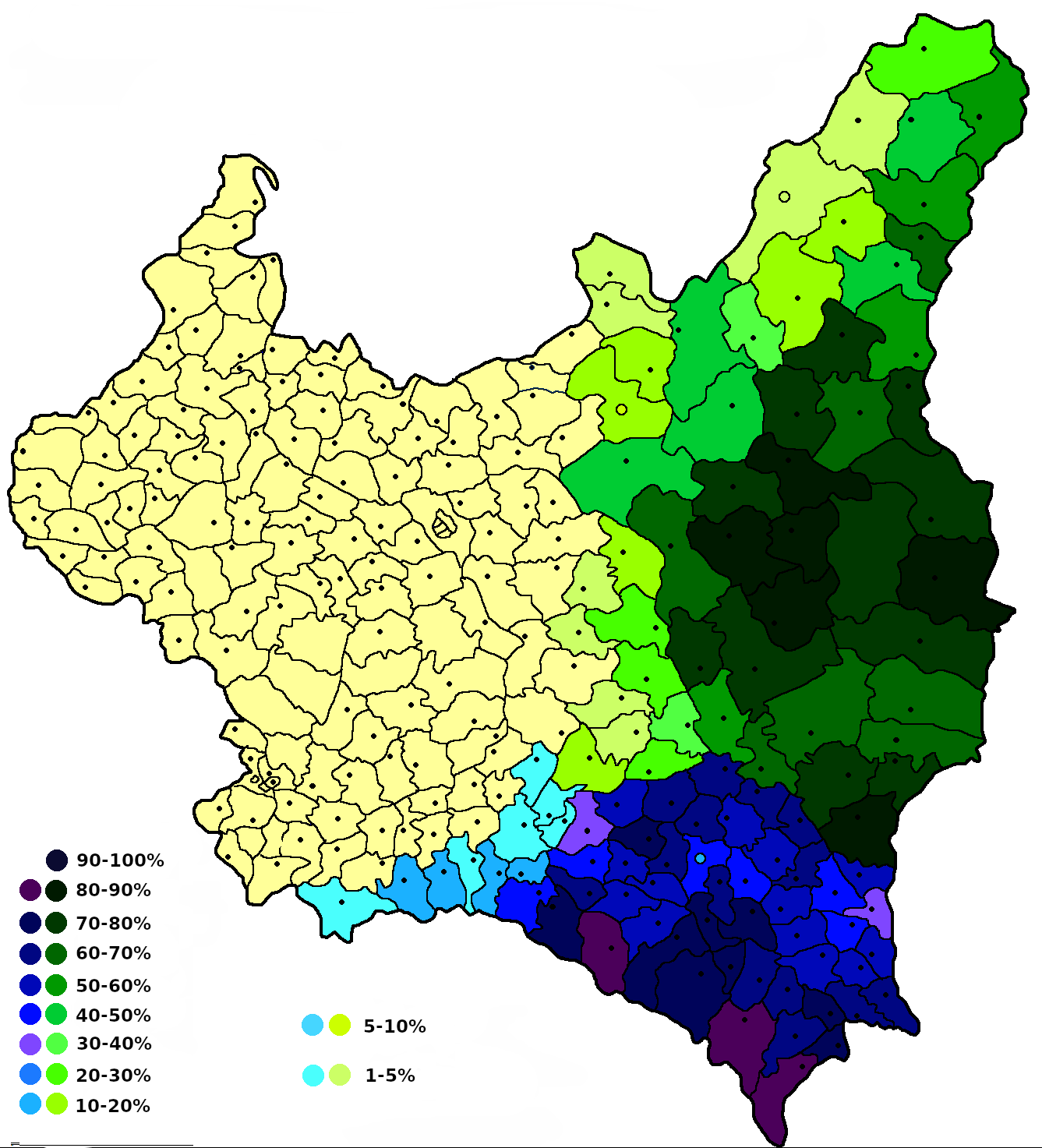
Orthodox Christians (green) and Greek Catholics (blue) in Poland in 1931.

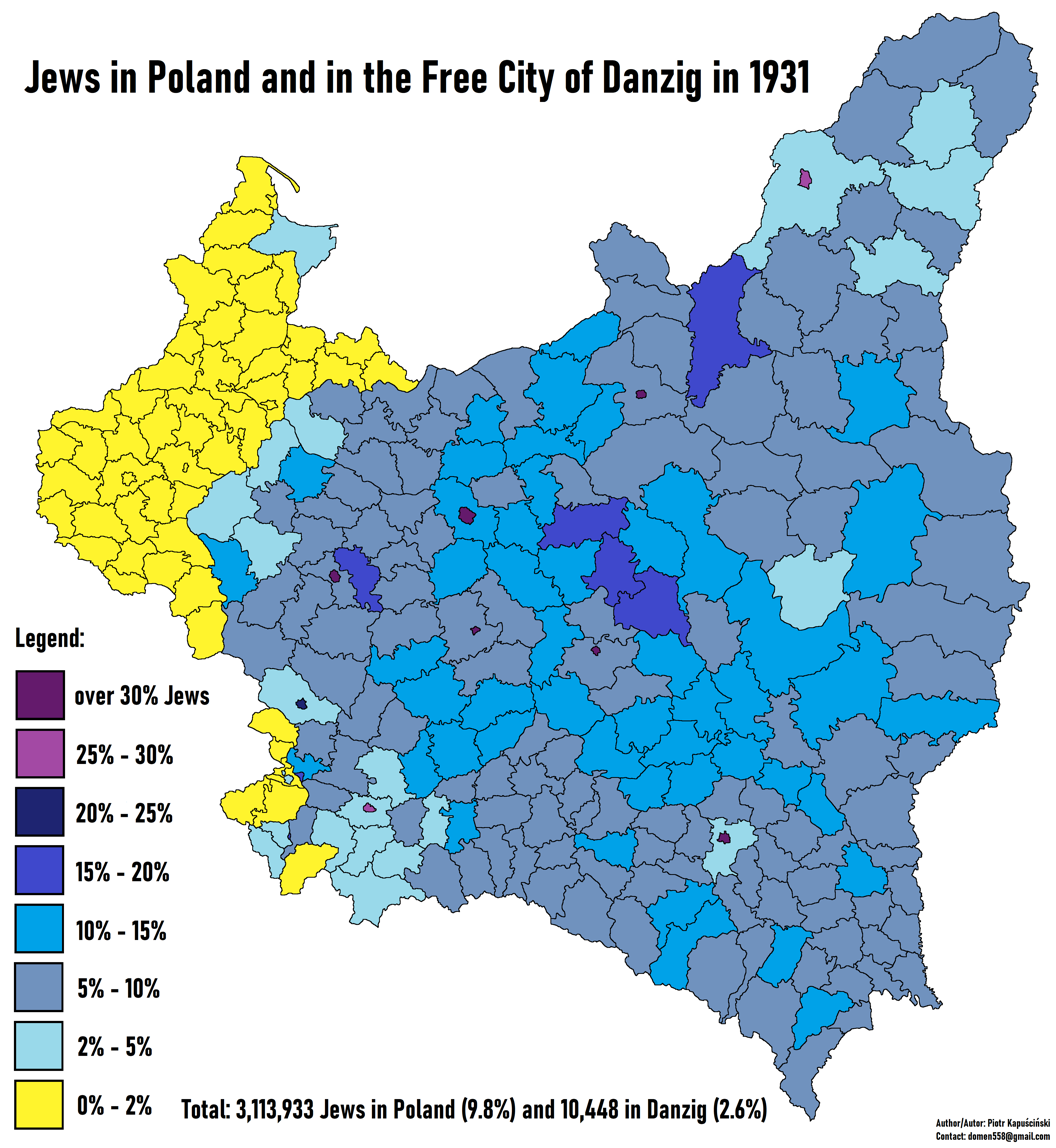
Jews in Poland in 1931.

The census used the concept of mother tongue and religion to classify the respondents, rather than nationality. The 1921 census had included a nationality question which was replaced in the 1931 census by the "mother tongue" question; this change was consistent with prior census policy of Russia, Germany and Austria surveying Polish lands. Many residents were bilingual or trilingual. Moreover, many Jews by religion - almost 12% - considered Polish to be their mother tongue in 1931. However, a higher percent of Jews by religion - over 25% - considered themselves to be ethnically (or in terms of national identity) Poles, according to the previous census of 1921. Thus the number of Jews by mother tongue increased as a percentage of the population in the 1931 survey, relative to the number of Jews as a nationality in the 1921 Census.

This situation created a difficulty in establishing the true number of ethnic non-Polish citizens of Poland. Some authors used the language criterion to attempt to establish the actual number of minorities, which was difficult considering that over 707,000 people in Polesia declared that they spoke "local" rather than any other language. Other authors used approximation based on both language and declared religion. After World War II in Soviet bloc countries the interpretation of the census was used for political purposes, to underline the officially-supported thesis that pre-war Poland incorporated areas where the non-Polish population made up the majority of inhabitants. For this purpose some authors combined all non-Polish speakers in South-Eastern Poland (namely Ukrainians, Belarusians, Rusyns, Hutsuls, Lemkos, Boykos and Poleszuks) into one category of "Ruthenians"). In fact, the census had counted speakers of Belarusian, Ukrainian, Russian, and Ruthenian languages as separate categories

Some authors contend that the change in questions asked by the census officials was due to the Polish government's wish to minimise the presence of minorities and represented an attempt to maximize the effects of a decade of educational policies stressing the Polish language. However, Timothy Snyder notes that following Josef Pilsudski's 1926 coup,'"state assimilation" rather than "national assimilation" was Polish policy; citizens were to be judged by their loyalty to the state, not by nationality.' Tadeusz Piotrowski called the 1931 census official but "unreliable" for determining ethnicity, and relying upon Jerzy Tomaszewski's "adjusted census figures" stated that Belarusians outnumbered ethnic Poles in Nowogródek Voivodeship and Polesie Voivodeship, but Poles outnumbered Belarusians in Wilno Voivodeship and Białystok Voivodeship. During McCarthyism, a 1954 study of the Polish population by the United States Census Bureau accepted Soviet post-war ethnography that "in presenting the results, the Central Statistical office emphasized the central role played by the Polish ethnic group by increasing the number of minority groups, and thus reducing the size of a given group, shown in the results. Ukrainian and Ruthenian were tabulated as separate languages, although Ukrainian was simply the newer name for Ruthenian, used by the more politically conscious and nationalistic elements." However, Polish General Census Commissioner, Dr. Rajmund Buławski, had stated at the time of the census that both the "Ukrainian" and "Rusyn" languages had been surveyed in parallel to avoid a negative impact on the census results due to objections from the "Old Ruthenians" to the novel categorization of their language as "Ukrainian", because they wished to disassociate themselves from it. The United States Census Bureau report also charged that in the Province of Polesie, the census authorities returned most of the inhabitants "there as speaking 'local languages'"., and declared them to have been "Belarusians".

After World War II the pre-war chairman of the Polish census statistical office Edward Szturm de Sztrem was quoted by communist sources to have admitted that the returned census forms had been interfered with by the executive. This it was claimed, affected particularly those forms from the south-eastern provinces. The extent of the tampering is not known. Another English language account stated that he admitted "that officials had been directed to undercount minorities, especially those in the eastern provinces". However, Szturm de Sztrem's alleged confession has never been produced.
