= Konská (Třinec) =

- municipal part of the Czech Republic
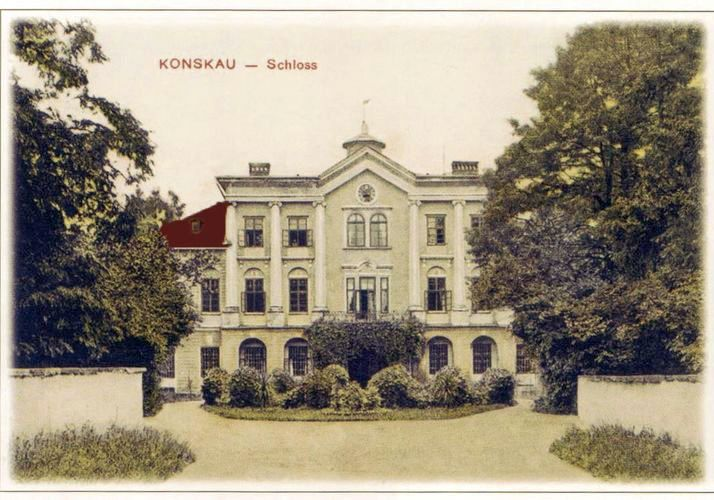

- Coordinates: 49°41′15″N 18°38′00″E
- Country: Czech Republic

Area
  - Total: 7.364 km^{2} (2.843 sq mi)

Population (26 March 2021)
  - Total: 1,635
  - Density: 220/km^{2} (580/sq mi)

Konská (Polish: Końska, German: Konskau) is a village in Frýdek-Místek District, Moravian-Silesian Region, Czech Republic, on the Olza River. It was a separate municipality but later became administratively a part of the town of Třinec. It has a population of 1,598 (1 January 2008). The village lies in the historical region of Cieszyn Silesia.

The name of the village is of cultural origins describing a village specialised in herding horses (Polish: koń).

== History ==
The settlement was first mentioned in a Latin document of Diocese of Wrocław called Liber fundationis episcopatus Vratislaviensis from around 1305 as item in Conka. It meant that the village was in the process of location (the size of land to pay a tithe from was not yet precised). The creation of the village was a part of a larger settlement campaign taking place in the late 13th century on the territory of what will be later known as Upper Silesia.

Politically the village belonged initially to the Duchy of Cieszyn, formed in 1290 in the process of feudal fragmentation of Poland and was ruled by a local branch of Piast dynasty. In 1327 the duchy became a fee of the Kingdom of Bohemia, which after 1526 became part of the Habsburg monarchy.

The village became a seat of a Catholic parish, mentioned in the register of Peter's Pence payment from 1447 among 50 parishes of Cieszyn deanery as Kanzkowicz. After 1540s Protestant Reformation prevailed in the Duchy of Cieszyn and a local Catholic church was taken over by Lutherans. It was taken from them (as one from around fifty buildings) in the region by a special commission and given back to the Roman Catholic Church on 21 March 1654.

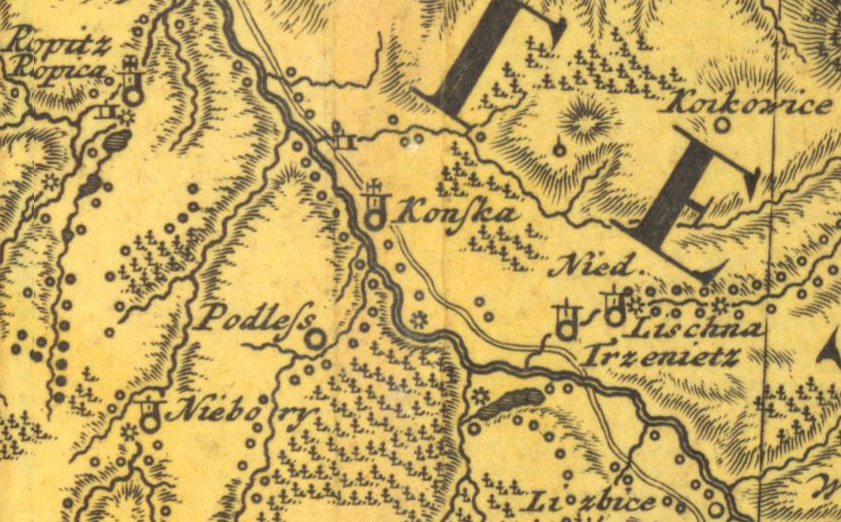
Konská on a map from 1736

After Revolutions of 1848 in the Austrian Empire a modern municipal division was introduced in the re-established Austrian Silesia. The village as a municipality was subscribed to the political and legal district of Cieszyn. According to the censuses conducted in 1880, 1890, 1900 and 1910 the population of the municipality grew from 1,590 in 1880 to 2,346 in 1910 with a dwindling majority being native Polish-speakers (from 95.9% in 1880 to 85% in 1910) accompanied by a growing German-speaking minority (from 26 or 1.7% in 1880 to 321 or 13.9% in 1910) and Czech-speaking (between 1.1% and 4%). In terms of religion in 1910 majority were Protestants (55.6%), followed by Roman Catholics (43.2%), Jews (21 or 0.9%) and 9 people adhering to another faiths. The village was also traditionally inhabited by Cieszyn Vlachs, speaking Cieszyn Silesian dialect.

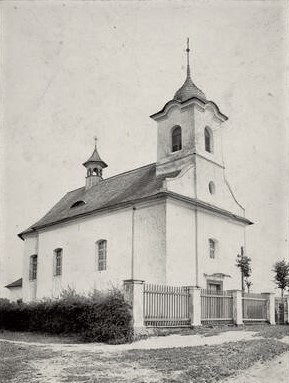
Church in Konská in the 1920s

After World War I, fall of Austria-Hungary, Polish–Czechoslovak War and the division of Cieszyn Silesia in 1920, it became a part of Czechoslovakia. Following the Munich Agreement, in October 1938 together with the Zaolzie region it was annexed by Poland, administratively adjoined to Cieszyn County of Silesian Voivodeship. It was then annexed by Nazi Germany at the beginning of World War II. In 1939, the Germans deported the local Polish wójt and the local Polish parish priest to concentration camps (see Nazi crimes against the Polish nation). The Germans operated a forced labour subcamp of the Nazi prison in Cieszyn in Konska. After the war it was restored to Czechoslovakia.

It was a large and important village in the past but during the communist era it was largely damaged by Třinec Iron and Steel Works. Many houses and properties were taken over by Třinec Iron and Steel Works and later destroyed. There is a château in the village, now practically devastated, owned by the steel works.

== People ==
Most famous native of Konská is Jan Kubisz, a Polish educator and poet. Other famous natives include Józef Buzek, a Polish economist and politician, Jan Buzek, a Polish physician and politician, Paweł Kubisz, a Polish poet and journalist and Adam Wawrosz, a Polish writer. Prime Minister of Poland Jerzy Buzek spent his childhood also in this village.

== See also ==
- Polish minority in the Czech Republic
- Zaolzie
