= Farmers' League =

Former Czechoslovak political party

Farmers' League Bund der Landwirte
- Founded: January 1919
- Dissolved: November 1938
- Merged into: Sudeten German Party
- Newspaper: Deutsche Landpost
- Youth wing: Landjugend
- Ideology: Agrarianism; Conservatism; Activism; German nationalism
- Colours: Green

Party flag

Farmers' League (German: Bund der Landwirte, BdL, Czech: Německý svaz zemědělců) was an ethnic German agrarian political party in Czechoslovakia. Ideologically the party was moderately conservative, having its base in the Sudetenland countryside. The party was led by Franz Spina. Landjugend was the youth wing of the party. In the 1920 election, the party won 11 seats (3.9% of the nationwide vote).

In the 1925 election, BdL won 24 parliamentary seats (8% of the vote). Following the election, BdL joined the Czechoslovak government. Spina became a national minister. After having entered the government the party began cooperation with the Czechoslovak agrarians.

In the 1929 election, the BdL parliamentary presence was halved. The party got 12 seats, having got 4% of the national vote.

After the DNP and DNSAP had been banned in October 1933, the political atmosphere in Sudetenland changed. The BdL came under pressure from rightwing radicals in Landjugend, and formed a movement called Landstand led by Gustav Hacker (the leader of Landjugend). Landstand was formed with the intention of enabling cooperation with the Sudetendeutsche Heimatfront (SHF). Through the creation of Landstand, it is possible that BdL sought to pre-empt competition from SHF in the Sudetenland countryside. BdL hoped to achieve a division of labour between Landstand and SHF, thinking that SHF would mobilize urban populace and BdL/Landstand would retain their dominance over rural German politics. These overtures to the SHF caused rifts in the Czechoslovak government. The DSAP (German Social Democrats), who were also in the government, were particularly worried and called upon BdL to differentiate themselves from 'the fascists'. In the end, BdL was side-lined as the Czechoslovak agrarians began to cooperate directly with SHF. Landstand became a short-lived movement.

In the 1935 election, BdL gathered 1.7% of the national vote. The party got five parliamentary seats. The party suffered badly from the competition from the Sudeten German Party (SdP), the new incarnation of SHF. After the election, BdL began to reorient itself towards cooperation with democratic forces, declaring their support to Edvard Beneš as president just before the election. But the party suffered continuously from defections from its ranks.

In the new scenario, BdL was divided into two fractions. One led by Hacker, who had become chairman of the party, and another led by Spina. After the Anschluß of Austria, Hacker called on all BdL members to join SdP. The situation in BdL became more and more chaotic. On March 22, 1938, Hacker proclaimed himself as the 'plenipotentiary' of BdL, and went on to declare the party to merged into SdP. The Spina-led fraction tried to regroup, but failed to reconstruct the BdL.
