= Józef Buzek =

Polish statistician and politician (1873–1936)

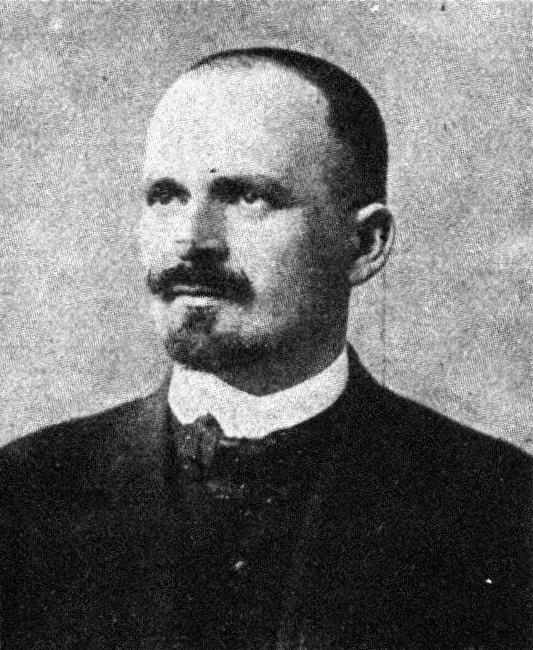
- Józef Buzek in 1907

Director of the Central Statistical Office of Poland
- In office 1918–1929
- Preceded by: -
- Succeeded by: Edward Szturm de Sztrem

Member of the Sejm
- In office 1919–1922

Member of the Polish Senate
- In office 1922–1927

Personal details
- Born: 16 November 1873 Końska, Austria-Hungary
- Died: 22 September 1936 (aged 62) Cieszyn, Poland
- Occupation: Economist, statistician

Józef Buzek (16 November 1873 – 22 September 1936) was a Polish lawyer, economist, statistician and politician.

== Biography ==
Buzek was born on 16 November 1873 in the village of Końska to a peasant's family. He graduated from state gymnasium in Cieszyn in 1894. He then studied law at the Jagiellonian University in Kraków and in Vienna, eventually earning a law degree at Jagiellonian University in 1899 and habilitation at Lwów University in 1902. Buzek was also politically active and was a deputy in the Imperial Council in Vienna from 1907 to 1918. He worked as a statistician in Vienna and was a chairman of Statistic Office in Lwów. He was the first director of the Polish Central Statistical Office from 1918 to 1929. Buzek was a member of the Sejm (1919–1922) and the Senate (1922–1927). Buzek wrote many books about statistics, national and political issues.

Józef Buzek is related to Jan Buzek and Jerzy Buzek, Polish politicians.

== Works ==
- Proces wynarodowienia w świetle nowszej statystyki narodowościowej państw europejskich (1903)
- Historya polityki narodowościowej rządu pruskiego wobec Polaków : od traktatów wiedeńskich do ustaw wyjątkowych z r. 1908 (1909)
- Rozwój stanu szkół średnich w Galicyi w ciągu ostatnich lat 50 (1859–1909) (1909)
- Administracya gospodarstwa społecznego : wykłady z zakresu nauki administracyi i austryackiego prawa (1913)
- Pogląd na wzrost ludności ziem polskich w wieku XIX (1915)
- Projekt konstytucji państwa polskiego i ordynacji wyborczej sejmowej oraz uzasadnienie i porównianie projektu konstytucji państwa polskiego z innemi konstytucjami (1918)
- Główne zasady polityczne ordynacji wyborczej do Sejmu i Senatu : studjum krytyczno-porównawcze (1922)
- Problemat równowagi budżetu państwowego w świetle statystyki finansowej (1923)
- Główne zasady politycznego programu agrarnego w dziedzinie handlowo-celnej : referat wygłoszony na posiedzeniu klubu posłów i senatorów P. S. L. w dniu 27 listopada 1925 r. (1925)
- Program gospodarczy Rzeczypospolitej i środki naprawy obecnych stosunków w rolnictwie (1927)

Government offices
Preceded by -	Director of the Central Statistical Office of Poland; 1918–1929	Succeeded by Edward Szturm de Sztrem
