= Czechoslovak Agrarian and Conservative Party =

Czechoslovak Agrarian and Conservative Party Československá strana agrární a konservativní
- Leader: Karel Prášek
- Founded: 1925
- Dissolved: 1925
- Split from: Republican Party of Farmers and Peasants
- Ideology: Conservatism; Agrarianism
- Political position: Right-wing

The Czechoslovak Agrarian and Conservative Party (ČSAK, Czech: Československá strana agrární a konservativní) was a conservative and agrarian political party in Czechoslovakia existed in year of 1925. Party was led by former chairman of the Republican Party of Farmers and Peasants Karel Prášek. Party dissolved in same year after failed to gain any seats in the 1925 Czechoslovak parliamentary election.
