= National Labour Party (Czechoslovakia, 1925) =

National Labour Party Národní strana práce
- Leader: Jaroslav Stránský
- Founded: September 1925
- Dissolved: February 1930
- Split from: ČsND
- Merged into: ČSNS
- Headquarters: Prague, Czechoslovakia
- Ideology: Liberalism; National liberalism
- Political position: Centre to centre-left
- Colours: Azure

The National Labour Party (Czech: Národní strana práce) was a liberal party created in September 1925 in Czechoslovakia. It was created from the split of the left-liberal part of Czechoslovak National Democracy. Central personalities of the party were Jan Herben and party chairman Jaroslav Stránský. In 1925 parliamentary elections party got only 1.38% of the votes. Since 1926, the party cooperated with, and in 1930 merged with the Czechoslovak National Socialist Party.

The party was supported by public figures like Karel Čapek and Ferdinand Peroutka.

== See also ==
- History of Czechoslovakia
