= Polish Socialist Workers Party =

Interwar socialist party in Czechoslovakia

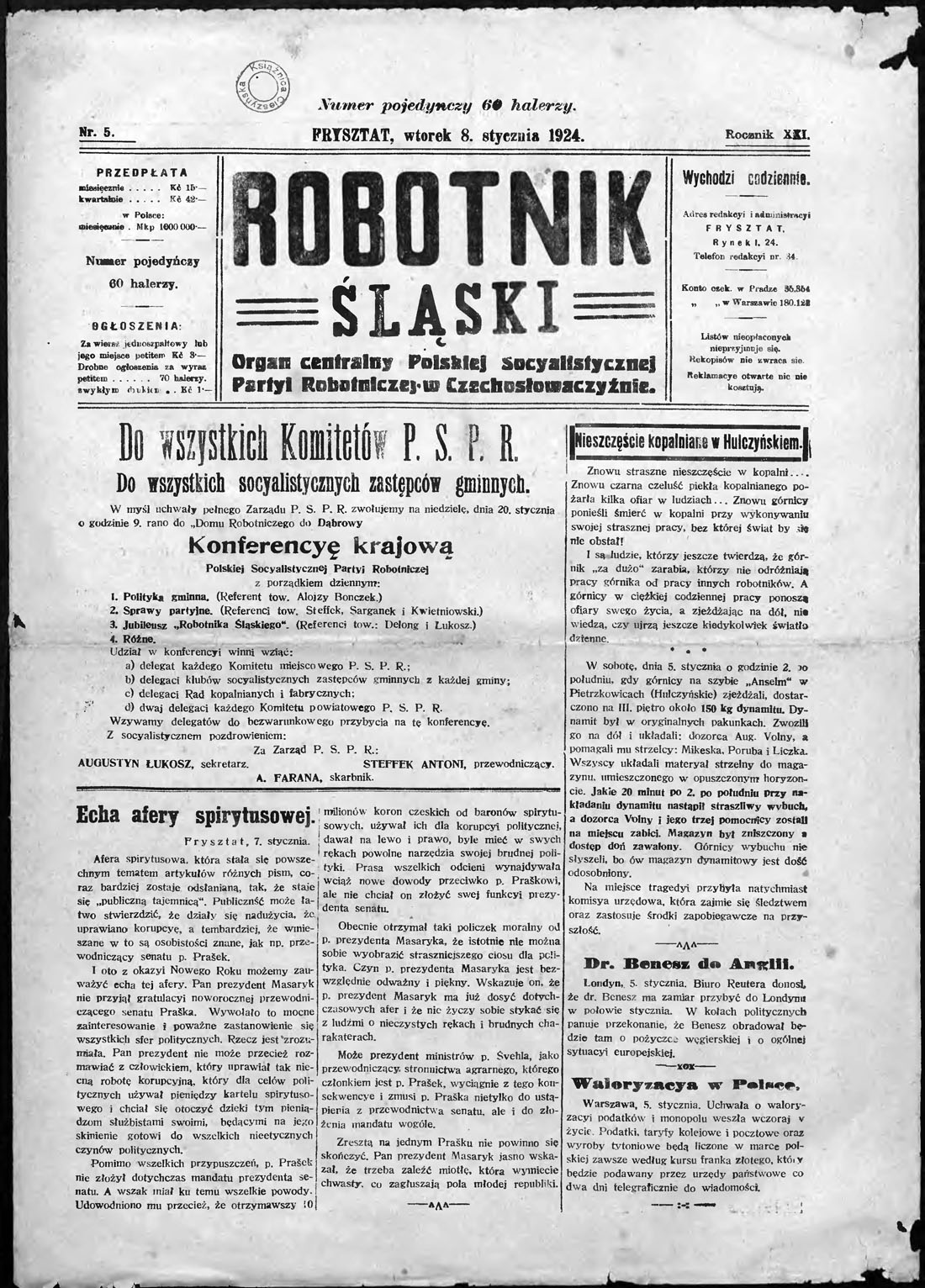
Front page of the Robotnik Śląski newspaper, 8 January 1924

Polish Socialist Workers Party (Polish: Polska Socjalistyczna Partia Robotnicza, PSPR) was a political party in Czechoslovakia founded in February 1921, based amongst Polish workers. The party was active in trade union struggles, mainly mobilizing miners and workers in heavy industries. The chairman of the party was Emanuel Chobot. Other prominent members of the party were Antoni Steffek and Wiktor Sembol. The party closely cooperated with the Czechoslovak Social Democratic Party. The party published the newspaper Robotnik Śląski ('Silesian Worker') from Fryštát.

In September 1921 internal conflicts in the party led to secession of the left-wing activists, who supported ideas of Comintern and joined the Communist Party of Czechoslovakia.

In the 1929 parliamentary election, Chobot was elected member of parliament. The party had contested the election in alliance with other Polish parties and the Jewish Party. Ahead of the 1935 parliamentary election, the party had reached an agreement with the Czechoslovak Social Democratic Party.

Before the 1935 elections, there was an internal debate between those who favoured a renewal of the Polish bloc electoral tactic of 1925 and 1929 and those who wanted a common list with Czechoslovak Social Democrats. Augustyn Łukosz, who was in favour of the first position, was excluded from the party in August 1934. The alliance with the Czechoslovak Social Democrats did not succeed to send a member of the Polish party to the Parliament. After the elections, Łukosz founded a new party, the Polish Social Democratic Party (PPSD), and in 1937 the PPSD merged with the Polish People's Party.

As of 1928, the party claimed a membership of 2,100, out of whom 150 were women. The youth organization of the party claimed a membership of 1,500. The party held party congresses every two years. The party was a member of the Labour and Socialist International between 1923 and 1938. It was represented by Chobot in the Executive of the International 1931–1938, he shared his seat with Johann Kowoll of DSAP.
