= Reichverbandes des Bundes der deutschen Landjugend =

German youth organization

Reichverbandes des Bundes der deutschen Landjugend (R.d. B.d.d.L.j.), generally called Landjugend ('Country Youth'), was an ethnic German youth movement in interbellum Czechoslovakia, politically related to the Farmers' League. The organization was founded in 1919. By 1922, Landjugend had 16,000 members.
