= Edward Szturm de Sztrem =

Polish statistician

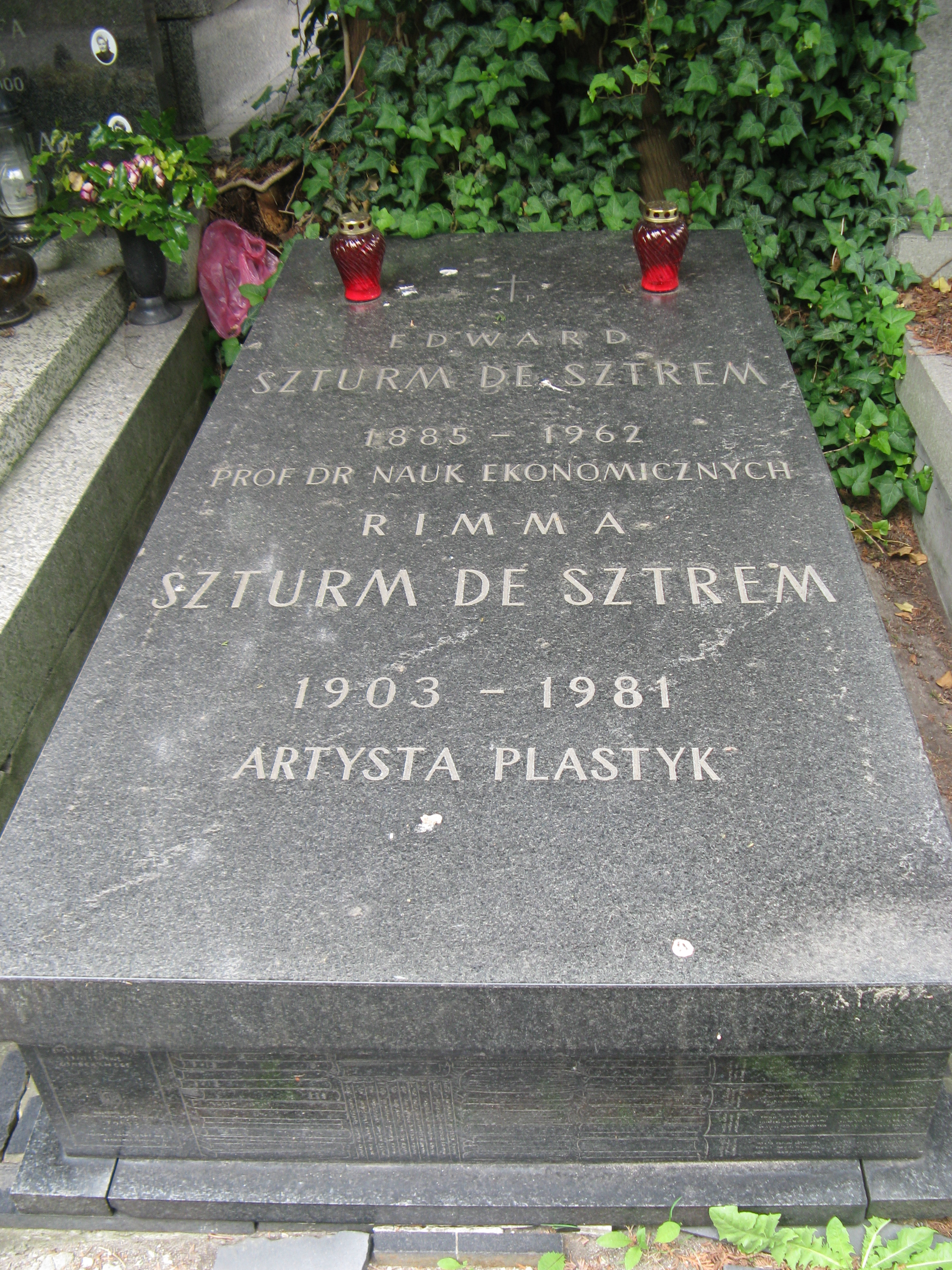
Grave of Szturm de Sztrem at Powązki Cemetery in Warsaw

Edward Szturm de Sztrem (18 July 1885 in Saint Petersburg – 9 September 1962 in Warsaw) was a Polish statistician and demographer. From 1929 till the German invasion of Poland in 1939 he was the director of the Polish Central Statistical Office, succeeding Józef Buzek. In 1937 he became the president of the newly founded Polish Statistical Society. He was a lecturer in the Wolna Wszechnica Polska before the war, and after the war, in the Main School of Planning and Statistics.

== Publications ==
- Kształtowanie się cen na ważniejsze artykuły rolne w Polsce, 1927
- Atlas statystyczny Polski, 1941
- Elementy demografii, 1956
