= Budislav (Svitavy District) =

- Municipality
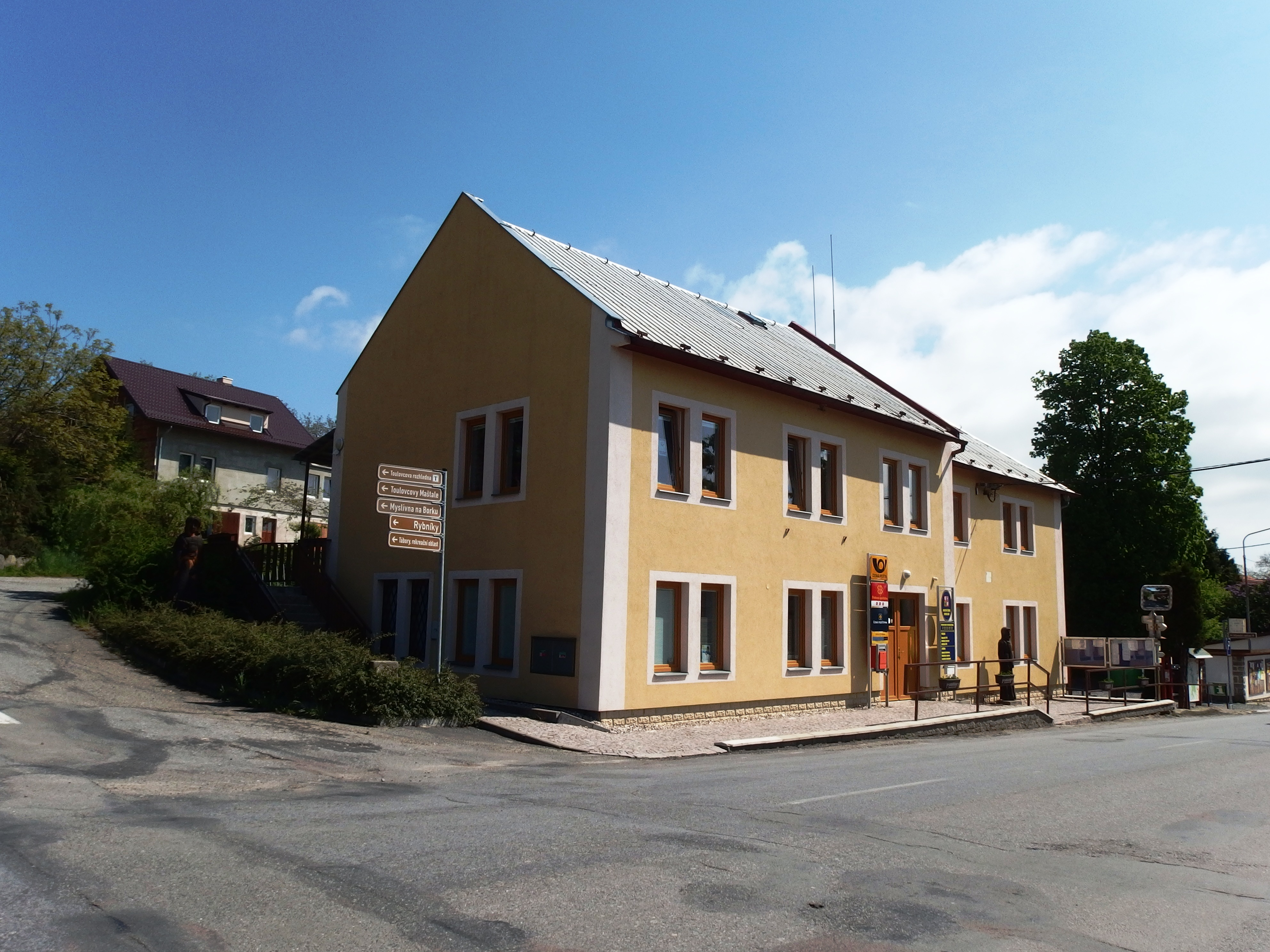
- Municipal office

- Flag Coat of arms

- Location in the Czech Republic
- Coordinates: 49°48′5″N 16°10′29″E
- Country: Czech Republic
- Region: Pardubice
- District: Svitavy
- First mentioned: 1313

Area
  - Total: 8.06 km^{2} (3.11 sq mi)
- Elevation: 520 m (1,710 ft)

Population (2026-01-01)
  - Total: 511
  - Density: 63.4/km^{2} (164/sq mi)
- Time zone: UTC+1 (CET)
  - Summer (DST): UTC+2 (CEST)
- Postal code: 569 65
- Website: www.obecbudislav.cz

Budislav is a municipality and village in Svitavy District in the Pardubice Region of the Czech Republic. It has about 500 inhabitants.

== Etymology ==
The name is derived from the personal name Budislav.

== Geography ==
Budislav is located about 21 kilometres (13 mi) west of Svitavy and 37 km (23 mi) southeast of Pardubice. It lies on the border between the Upper Svratka Highlands and Svitavy Uplands. The highest point is at 645 m (2,116 ft) above sea level. The Desná Stream flows through the municipality. Inside the built-up area is a system of two fishponds, supplied by a tributary of the Desná.

== History ==
The first written mention of Budislav is from 1313. It was probably founded in the 13th century. The village was acquired by the town of Litomyšl in 1480. After that, records of further history are lacking.

In the mid-18th century, while non-Catholic religious practice was banned, multiple people from Budislav and surrounding villages went abroad and others were put on trial for heresy. After the issuance of the Patent of Toleration in 1781 by Emperor Joseph II, evangelicals achieved religious freedom. In 1806, evangelicals founded their own cemetery in a locality called Na Klínku.

== Demographics ==
Historical population

Year	Pop.	±%
1869	1,423	—
1880	1,270	−10.8%
1890	1,186	−6.6%
1900	1,085	−8.5%
1910	1,115	+2.8%

Year	Pop.	±%
1921	1,041	−6.6%
1930	998	−4.1%
1950	697	−30.2%
1961	702	+0.7%
1970	606	−13.7%

Year	Pop.	±%
1980	501	−17.3%
1991	435	−13.2%
2001	435	+0.0%
2011	449	+3.2%
2021	446	−0.7%

Source: Censuses

== Transport ==
There are no railways or major roads passing through the municipality.

== Sights ==
Among the protected cultural monuments in the municipality is a Neoclassical gamekeeper's lodge, a monument to Soviet soldiers, and a 1930s guesthouse building that is an architecturally valuable example of modernism.

The main landmark of Budislav is the Church of Divine Love. It is heart-shaped and stands on a rocky lookout. Its construction began in 1994, but due to financial reasons, construction was interrupted and the church was consecrated only in 2004. It is an ecumenical church, serving people of all faiths.
