= Budislav (given name) =

Budislav is a given name. Notable people with the name include:

- Budislav Grga Angjelinović (1886–1946), Croatian politician and lawyer
- Budislav Šoškić (1925–1979), Montenegrin politician
- Budislav Vukas (born 1938), Croatian jurist
