= Jan Buzek =

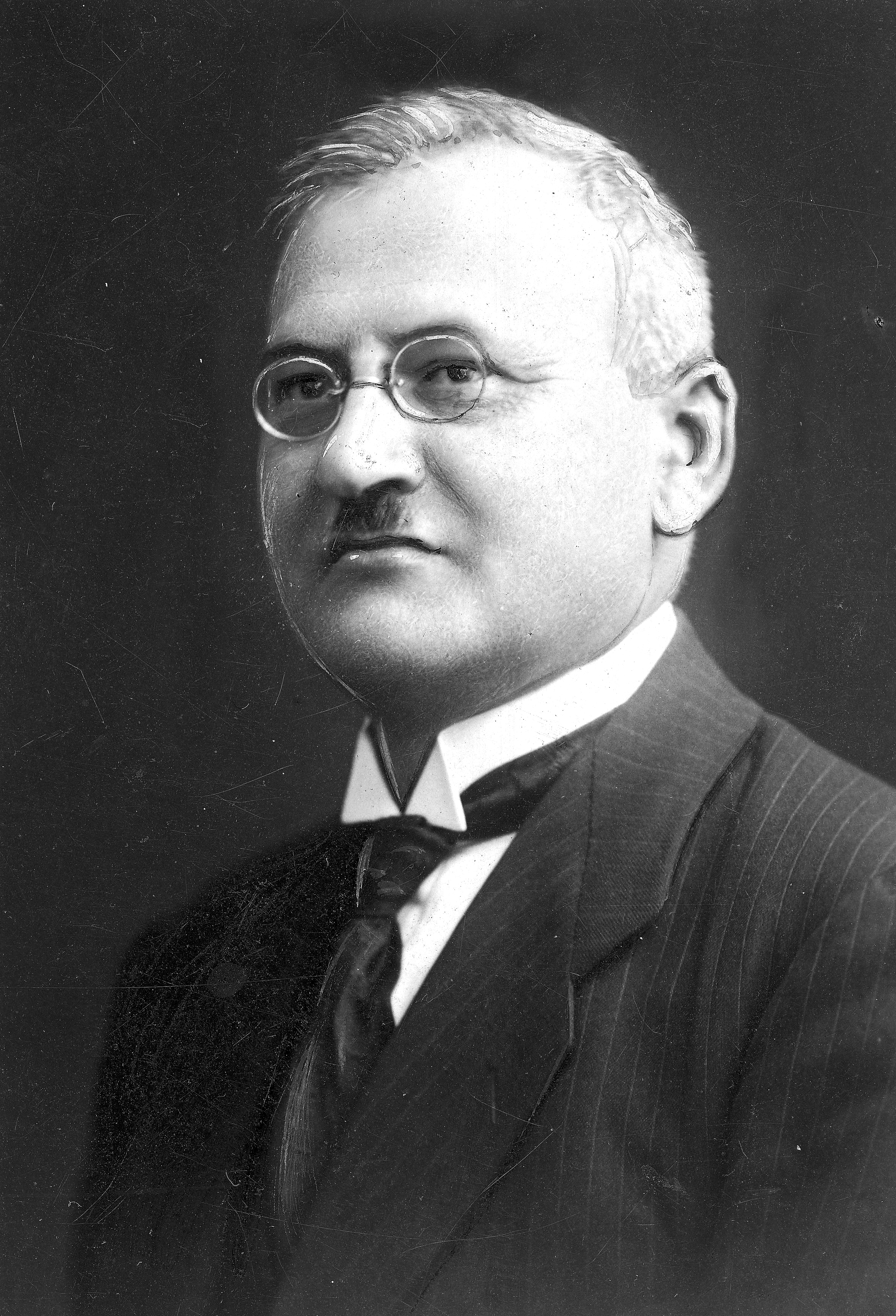
- Portrait, 1929

Member of the National Assembly of Czechoslovakia
- In office 1929–1935

Personal details
- Born: 27 March 1874 Końska, Austria-Hungary
- Died: 24 November 1940 (aged 66) Dachau, Nazi Germany
- Resting place: Bystřice
- Party: Polish People's Party
- Children: Jan, Władysław
- Education: Jagiellonian University
- Occupation: Physician

Jan Jerzy Buzek (27 March 1874 – 24 November 1940) was a Polish physician, activist and politician. He came from the region of Trans-Olza.

== Biography ==
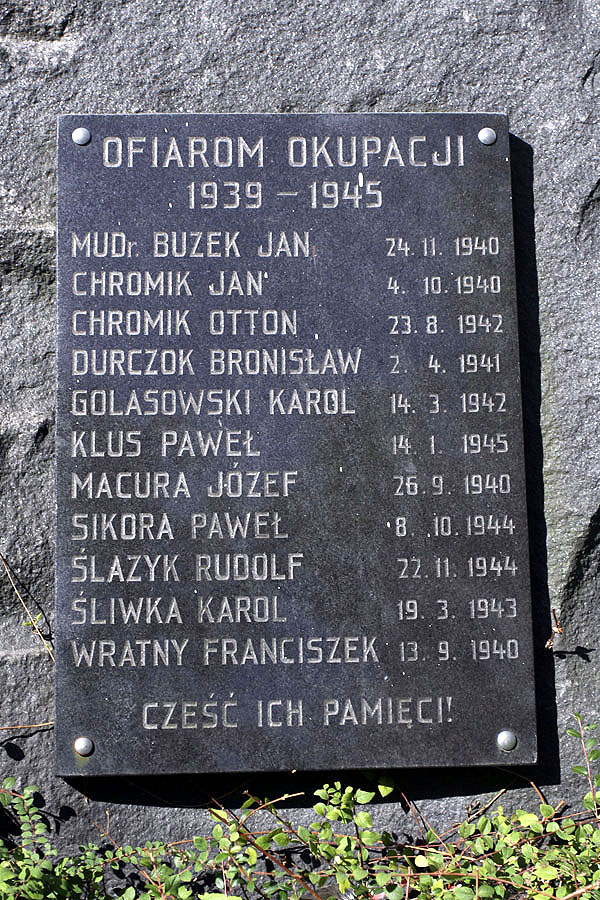
Jan Buzek commemorated on the memorial plaque to victims of World War II in Doubrava

Buzek was born in Końska as a son of a peasant. He graduated from primary school there, and later from the German gymnasium in Cieszyn. He later decided to study medicine at Jagiellonian University in Kraków and graduated in 1901. In 1902 he became a municipal and miners' doctor in the coal mining village of Doubrava. He worked in Orlová, where he helped to found the Juliusz Słowacki Polish Grammar School. In World War I he served in the Austrian Army as a doctor.

Buzek also lectured at various schools. From a young age he was active in Polish cultural and educational organizations, eventually becoming chairman of many of them, including Związek Harcerstwa Polskiego (The Polish Scouting and Guiding Association) in Czechoslovakia. He was a co-founder of the Polish People's Party, a Polish political party in Czechoslovakia of a Protestant and liberal character. In 1931 Buzek became a leader of this party. He was a member of the National Assembly of Czechoslovakia in Prague from 1929 to 1935. As a deputy, Buzek defended the rights of the Polish minority, often cooperating with another Polish deputy, socialist Emanuel Chobot.

After the outbreak of World War II, Buzek was arrested by Nazi authorities on 12 April 1940 and on 28 April incarcerated by the Nazis in the Dachau concentration camp. He was transferred on 5 June to Mauthausen-Gusen camp, and on 15 August again to Dachau concentration camp. Before arrest his weight was 118 kg, before his death 45–50 kg. He died in Dachau on 24 November 1940 from exhaustion. Before death he said to his fellow inmate:

I looked 40 years to the eyes of death, but today nobody will help me. I was saving people, best how I could; but today nobody will save me. My left eye is blind.

He wished his ashes to be laid at a cemetery in Bystřice, in the grave of his first wife Anna, his first love. He is buried there.

His second wife was Jadwiga Dyboska, the daughter of Antoni Dyboski.
