= Polish People's Party (Czechoslovakia) =

Polish People's Party Polskie Stronnictwo Ludowe
- Abbreviation: PSL
- Founded: 1922
- Dissolved: 1937
- Merged into: Polska Partia Ludowa
- Ideology: Christian democracy Agrarian socialism Agrarianism
- Political position: Centre-left
- Religion: Protestantism

Polish People's Party (Polish: Polskie Stronnictwo Ludowe, PSL) was a political party in Czechoslovakia founded in autumn 1922, based amongst Polish middle-class Protestants. The chairman of the party was doctor Jan Buzek. Other prominent party activists were pastor Józef Berger and journalist Jarosław Waleczko. In the 1929 parliamentary election, Buzek was elected member of parliament. He joined the Czechoslovak Social Democratic parliamentary group. The party published the weekly newspaper Ewangelik from Český Těšín (Czeski Cieszyn) and Prawo ludu as a party newspaper.
