= Order of Tomáš Garrigue Masaryk =

Order of the Czech Republic

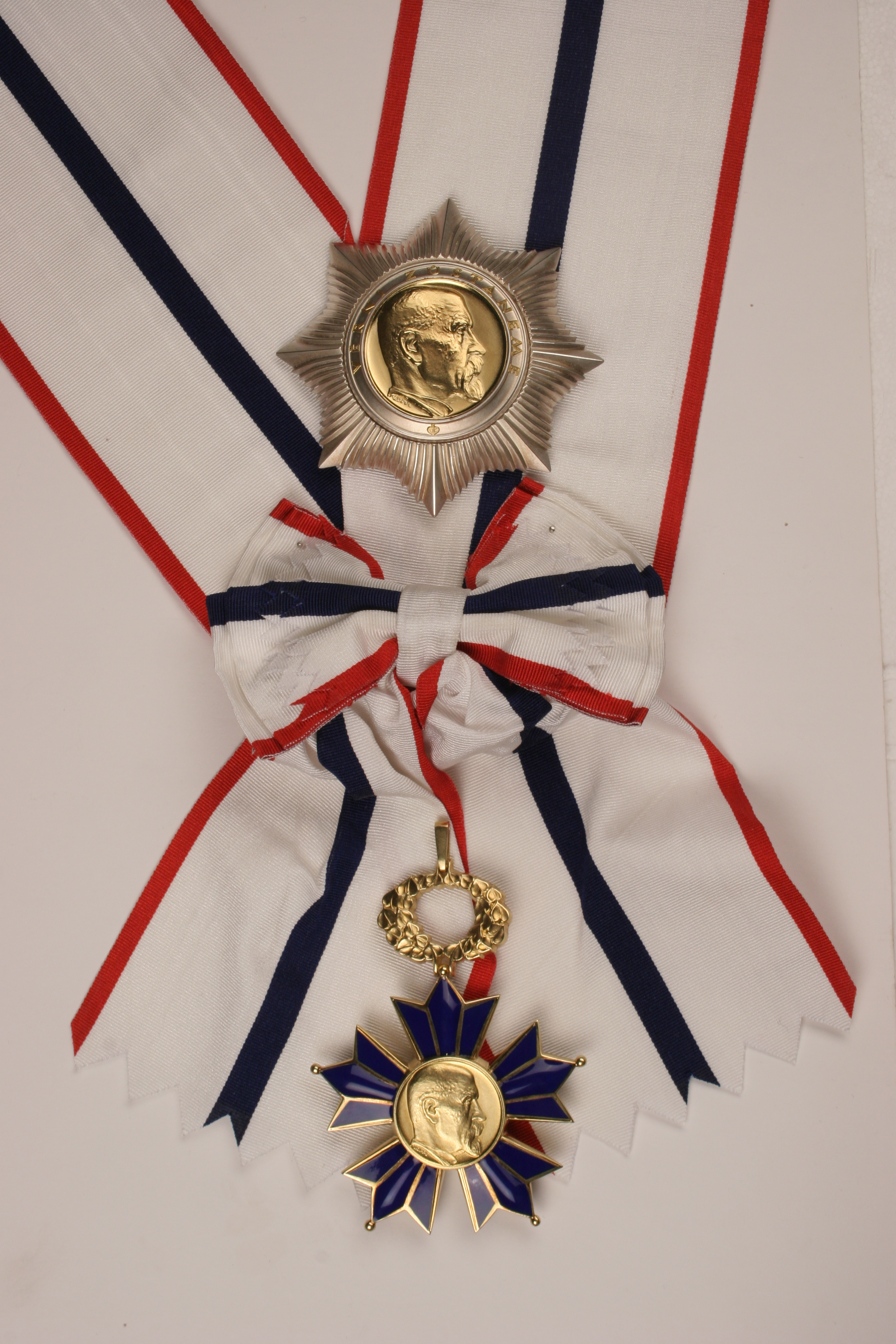
- Badge, ribband, and star of the First Class

Awarded by the President of the Czech Republic
- Type: Order
- Grades: Grand Cross; Grand Officier; Commander; Officer; Knight

Precedence
- Next (higher): Order of the White Lion
- Next (lower): Medal of Heroism
- Ribbon bar for the Grand Cross

The Order of Tomáš Garrigue Masaryk (Czech: Řád Tomáše Garrigua Masaryka) is an Order of the Czech Republic and the former Czechoslovakia. It was established in 1990 after the Velvet Revolution, and re-established in 1994 (following the dissolution of Czechoslovakia). The President of the Czech Republic awards it to individuals who have made outstanding contributions to the development of democracy, humanity and human rights. Unlike in the past, it is awarded to the Czech citizens and foreigners alike. The order has five classes, of which class I is the highest. The order is named in honor of Tomáš Garrigue Masaryk, an advocate of Czechoslovak independence and the first President of Czechoslovakia.

== Design ==
The insignia was designed by Vladimír Oppl. The badge is a blue enameled star-shaped ornament with Masaryk's portrait placed in the center. A medallion placed centrally on the reverse of the badge bears the Greater Coat of Arms of the Czech Republic encircled by a white ring with the inscription "VĚRNI ZŮSTANEME" ("We Shall Remain Faithful"), the motto of the Order.

== Ribbon bars ==
Order of Tomáš Garrigue Masaryk ribbon bars
	ČSFR (1990–1992)	Czech Republic (since 1994)
I. Class		
II. Class		
III. Class		
IV. Class		
V. Class		

== Recipients ==
=== Czechoslovakia ===
==== 1991 ====
- Cardinal Josef Beran, in memoriam, class I
- Josef Čapek, h.c., in memoriam, class I
- Václav Černý, in memoriam, class I
- Rudolf Firkušný, class I
- Milan Hodža, in memoriam, class I
- Milada Horáková, in memoriam, class I
- Janko Jesenský, in memoriam, class I
- Dušan Jurkovič, in memoriam, class I
- Záviš Kalandra, in memoriam, class I
- Rafael Kubelík, class I
- Jan Masaryk, Dr.h.c., in memoriam, class I
- Jan Palach, in memoriam, class I
- Ján Papánek, class I
- Jan Patočka, in memoriam, class I
- Ferdinand Peroutka, in memoriam, class I
- Daniel Rapant, in memoriam, class I
- Fedor Ruppeldt, in memoriam, class I
- Jaroslav Seifert, in memoriam, class I
- Rostislav Sochorec, in memoriam, class I
- Milan Šimečka, in memoriam, class I
- Svätopluk Štúr, in memoriam, class I
- Dominik Tatarka, in memoriam, class I
- Cardinal František Tomášek, class I
- Jan Zajíc, in memoriam, class I
- Tomáš Baťa, class II
- Prokop Drtina, in memoriam, class II
- Rudolf Fraštacký, in memoriam, class II
- Pavol Peter Gojdič, in memoriam, class II
- Josef Grňa, in memoriam, class II
- Egon Hostovský, in memoriam, class II
- Roman Jakobson, in memoriam, class II
- Jiří Kolář, class II
- Jindřich Kolovrat, class II
- Martin Kvetko, class II
- Jan Lang, class II
- Jozef Lettrich, in memoriam, class II
- Bohuslav Martinů, in memoriam, class II
- Anastáz Opasek, class II
- Hubert Ripka, in memoriam, class II
- František Schwarzenberg, class II
- Koloman Sokol, class II
- Jaroslav Stránský, in memoriam, class II
- Jan Šrámek, in memoriam, class II
- Vavro J. Šrobár, in memoriam, class II
- Jan Zahradníček, in memoriam, class II
- Petr Zenkl, in memoriam, class II
- Josef Zvěřina, in memoriam, class II
- Samuel Belluš, class III
- Johann Wolfgang Brügel, in memoriam, class III
- Jan Čep, in memoriam, class III
- Ivo Ducháček, in memoriam, class III
- Karel Engliš, in memoriam, class III
- Jozef Felix, in memoriam, class III
- Viktor Fischl (Avigdor Dagan), class III
- Bedřich Fučík, in memoriam, class III
- Alexandr Heidler, in memoriam, class III
- Václav Hlavatý, in memoriam, class III
- Vincent Hložník, class III
- Fedor Hodža, in memoriam, class III
- Vladimír Holan, in memoriam, class III
- Josef Hora, in memoriam, class III
- Ota Hora, class III
- Jindřich Chalupecký, in memoriam, class III
- Ján Jamnický, in memoriam, class III
- Štefan Janšák, Dr.h.c., in memoriam, class III
- Zdeněk Kalista, in memoriam, class III
- Imrich Karvaš, in memoriam, class III
- Božena Komárková, class III
- Ivan Krasko, in memoriam, class III
- Leopold Lahola, in memoriam, class III
- František Lederer, in memoriam, class III
- Cyprián Majerník, in memoriam, class III
- Ivan Medek, class III
- Václav Neumann, class III
- Jaroslav Pecháček, class III
- Přemysl Pitter, in memoriam, class III
- Karel Plicka, in memoriam, class III
- Alfréd Radok, in memoriam, class III
- Milan Rúfus, class III
- Josef Šafařík, class III
- František Švantner, in memoriam, class III
- Eduard Táborský, class III
- Zdeněk Urbánek, class III
- Jan Vladislav, class III
- Jiří Weil, in memoriam, class III
- Otto Wichterle, class III
- Rudolf Briška, in memoriam, class IV
- Oskár Ferianc, in memoriam, class IV
- Ctibor Filčík, in memoriam, class IV
- Alexander Hirner, in memoriam, class IV
- Ján Jesenský, in memoriam, class IV
- Jiří Král, class IV
- Anna Kvapilová, class IV
- Michal Lukniš, in memoriam, class IV
- Ján Mikleš, class IV
- Jarmila Novotná-Daubek, class IV
- Gustáv Papp, class IV
- Bernadeta Pánčiová, class IV
- Bohumil Sekla, in memoriam, class IV
- Ester Šimerová-Martinčeková, class IV
- Jan Šimsa, class IV
- Jaroslav Werstadt, in memoriam, class IV
- Peter Zaťko, in memoriam, class IV

==== 1992 ====
- Ivan Dérer, in memoriam, class I
- Alfred Fuchs, in memoriam, class I
- Jozef Gregor-Tajovský, in memoriam, class I
- Kamil Krofta, in memoriam, class I
- Ivan Markovič, in memoriam, class I
- Štefan Osuský, in memoriam, class I
- Lev Sychrava, in memoriam, class I
- Přemysl Šámal, in memoriam, class I
- Jaroslav Šimsa, in memoriam, class I
- Josef Štemberka, in memoriam, class I
- Vladislav Vančura, in memoriam, class I
- Vladimír Pavol Čobrda, in memoriam, class II
- Vojta Beneš, in memoriam, class II
- Zdeněk Bořek-Dohalský, in memoriam, class II
- Fedor Houdek, in memoriam, class II
- Václav Majer, in memoriam, class II
- Jozef Országh, in memoriam, class II
- Samuel Štefan Osuský, in memoriam, class II
- Antonín Pešl, in memoriam, class II
- Albert Pražák, in memoriam, class II
- Vojtěch Preissig, in memoriam, class II
- Emanuel Rádl, in memoriam, class II
- Juraj Slávik, in memoriam, class II
- Anton Štefánek, in memoriam, class II
- Jan Uher, in memoriam, class II
- Ján Ursíny, in memoriam, class II
- Růžena Vacková, in memoriam, class II
- Ján Bečko, in memoriam, class III
- Ján Bulík, in memoriam, class III
- František Dvorník, in memoriam, class III
- Julius Firt, in memoriam, class III
- Vladimír Grégr, in memoriam, class III
- Vlasta Kálalová, in memoriam, class III
- František Kovárna, in memoriam, class III
- František Kriegl, in memoriam, class III
- Božena Kuklová-Štúrová, in memoriam, class III
- Ján Lichner, in memoriam, class III
- Antonín Mandl, in memoriam, class III
- František Němec, in memoriam, class III
- Josef Palivec, in memoriam, class III
- Josef Patejdl, in memoriam, class III
- Františka Plamínková, in memoriam, class III
- Marie Provazníková, in memoriam, class III
- Václav Talich, in memoriam, class III
- Štěpán Trochta, in memoriam, class III
- Květoslava Viestová, in memoriam, class III
- Františka Zeminová, in memoriam, class III
- Stanislav Broj, in memoriam, class IV
- Ludwig Czech, in memoriam, class IV
- Josef Ludvík Fischer, in memoriam, class IV
- Želmíra Gašparíková, in memoriam, class IV
- Anna Gašparíková-Horáková, in memoriam, class IV
- Helena Koželuhová, in memoriam, class IV
- Karel Kučera, in memoriam, class IV
- Zdeněk Němeček, in memoriam, class IV
- Václav Paleček, in memoriam, class IV
- Bohumil Přikryl, in memoriam, class IV
- Ladislav Radimský, in memoriam, class IV
- Bohuslav Reynek, in memoriam, class IV
- Josef Rotnágl, in memoriam, class IV
- Evald Schorm, in memoriam, class IV
- Jan Slavík, in memoriam, class IV
- Karel Steinbach, in memoriam, class IV
- Grigorij Žatkovič, in memoriam, class IV

=== Czech Republic ===
==== 1995 ====
- Karel Čapek, in memoriam, class I
- Ladislav Feierabend, in memoriam, class I
- Karel Otčenášek, class I
- Ladislav Rašín, in memoriam, class I
- Pavel Tigrid, class I
- Charles A. Vanik, class I
- René Wellek, class I
- Bernard Braine, class II
- Karel Hrubý, class II
- František Langer, in memoriam, class II
- Karel Poláček, in memoriam, class II
- Mojmír Povolný, class II
- Wolfgang Scheur, class II
- Antonín A. Weber, in memoriam, class II
- Vilém Brzorád, in memoriam, class III
- Josef Fischer, in memoriam, class III
- Ladislav Hejdánek, class III
- Zdeněk Rotrekl, class III

==== 1996 ====
- Jan Opletal, in memoriam, class I
- Rudolf Kirchschläger, class I
- Juscelino Kubitschek de Oliveira, in memoriam, class I
- Blahoslav Hrubý, in memoriam, class II
- Antonín Hřebík, in memoriam, class II
- Milena Jesenská, in memoriam, class II
- Dominik Pecka, in memoriam, class II
- Max van der Stoel, class II
- Jakub Čermín, class III
- Eugéne V. Faucher, class III
- Viktor Fischl, class III
- Slavomír Klaban, class III
- Radomír Luža, class III
- Anton Otte, class III
- Bohumil Vít Tajovský, class III
- Ludvík Vaculík, class III
- Jiří G. Corn, in memoriam, class IV
- Antonín Remeš, in memoriam, class IV

==== 1997 ====
- Gorazd, Orthodox Bishop of Bohemia and Moravia-Silesia, in memoriam, class I
- Olga Havlová, in memoriam, class I
- František Halas, in memoriam, class II
- Rudolf Battěk, class III
- Otta Bednářová, class III
- Jaroslav Drábek, in memoriam, class III
- Josef Fišera, class III
- Richard Glazar, class III
- Oto Mádr, class III
- Radim Palouš, class III
- Karel Pecka, in memoriam, class III
- Colonel (ret.) Luboš Hruška, class V
- Dagmar Skálová, class V

==== 1998 ====
- Zbigniew Brzezinski, PhD., class I
- Jeane Kirkpatrick, PhD., class I
- Henry A. Kissinger, PhD., class I
- Jaroslav Kvapil, in memoriam, class II
- Mikuláš Lobkowicz, class II
- Václav Renč, in memoriam, class II
- Richard Belcredi, class III
- Stanislav Drobný, class III
- Viktor M. Fic, class III
- Emil Filla, in memoriam, class III
- Antonín Huvar, class III
- Václav Hyvnar, class III
- Vlasta Chramostová, class III
- Rudolf Karel, in memoriam, class III
- Major General Jaroslav Kašpar-Pátý, in memoriam, class III
- Jiří Kovtun, class III
- Jan Milíč Lochman, class III
- Václav Malý, Auxiliary Bishop of Prague, class III
- Jaroslav Opat, class III
- Vilém Prečan, class III
- Vladimír Sís, in memoriam, class III
- Jakub S. Trojan, class III
- Emanuel Viktor Voska, in memoriam, class III
- Marie Dubinová, class IV
- Zdena Mašínová, in memoriam, class IV
- Jaroslav Mezník, class IV
- Jaromír Šavrda, in memoriam, class IV
- Tomáš Špidlík, class IV (21 Oct. 2003 Cardinal)
- Bedřich Utitz, class IV
- Nicholas Winton, class IV

==== 1999 ====
- Josef Karel Matocha, archbishop of Olomouc, in memoriam, class I
- Oldřich Černý, class III
- Přemysl Janýr, in memoriam, class III

==== 2000 ====
- Rudolf Jílovský, in memoriam, class II
- Josef Lux, in memoriam, class II
- Jiří Horák, class III
- Milan Machovec, class III
- Jaroslav Musial, class IV
- Michael Novak, class III
- Miloš Tomčík, class IV
- Hans Dieter Zimmermann, class IV

==== 2001 ====
- Robert Badinter, class I
- Ryszard Siwiec, in memoriam, class I
- Vojtěch Dundr, in memoriam, class II
- Václav Chytil, in memoriam, class III
- Jindřich Vaško, in memoriam, class III
- Barbara Coudenhove-Kalergi, class IV
- Petr Adamus, class IV
- Karel Vrána, class IV
- František Lízna, SJ., class V

==== 2002 ====
- Cardinal Miloslav Vlk, Archbishop of Prague and Metropolitan Bishop of Bohemia, class II
- Luboš Dobrovský, class III
- Richard Feder, in memoriam, class III
- Zdeněk Kessler, class III
- Jacques Rupnik, class III
- Karel Schwarzenberg, class III
- Karol Sidon, Rabbi of Prague and Chief Rabbi of the Czech Republic, class III
- Pavel Smetana, Moderator of the Evangelical Church of Czech Brethren, class III
- Dagmar Burešová, class IV
- Ladislav Lis, in memoriam, class IV

==== 2003 ====
- Václav Havel, class I (conferred by the parliament)
- Mary Robinson, class I
- Willy Spühler, in memoriam, class I
- Elena Bonner, class II
- Sergei Kovalev, class II
- Luisa Abrahams, class III
- Miroslav Kusý, class III
- Emil Ludvík, class III
- Lubomír Voleník, in memoriam, class III
- Adam Michnik, class III
- Antonín Sum, class III
- Jaroslav Škarvada, class III
- Antje Vollmer, class III

==== 2004 ====
- Colonel (ret.) Arnošt Kubík, class III
- Lieutenant General (ret.) Tomáš Sedláček, class III
- Colonel (ret.) Otokar Vinklář, class III
- Josef Zlámal, O. Melit. Prior, class III

==== 2005 ====
- Brigadier General (ret.) Josef Hercz, class I
- Major General (ret.) Stanislav Hlučka, class I
- Martin František Vích, class III

==== 2006 ====
- Naděžda Kavalírová, class I
- Brigadier General (ret.) Miroslav Štandera, class I
- Matylda Čiháková, class II
- Captain Václav Kojzar, in memoriam, class II
- Michael Josef Pojezdný, class II
- Karel Skalický, class IV

==== 2007 ====
- Vladimír Bystrov, class II
- Jiří Formánek, class II
- František Zahrádka, class III

==== 2008 ====
- Jakub Blacký, class II
- Bohuslav Bubník, class II
- Jan Graubner, class II
- Josef Lesák, class II
- Jaroslav Grosman, class III
- František Wiendl, class III

==== 2009 ====
- Anděla Dvořáková, class
- Josefina Napravilová, class III
- František Šedivý, class II
- Josef Veselý, class III
- Pavel Žák, class IV

==== 2014 ====
- Hana Hegerová, class I
- Miroslav Zikmund, class I

==== 2024 ====
- Bill Clinton, class I
