= Mělkovice =

- Village
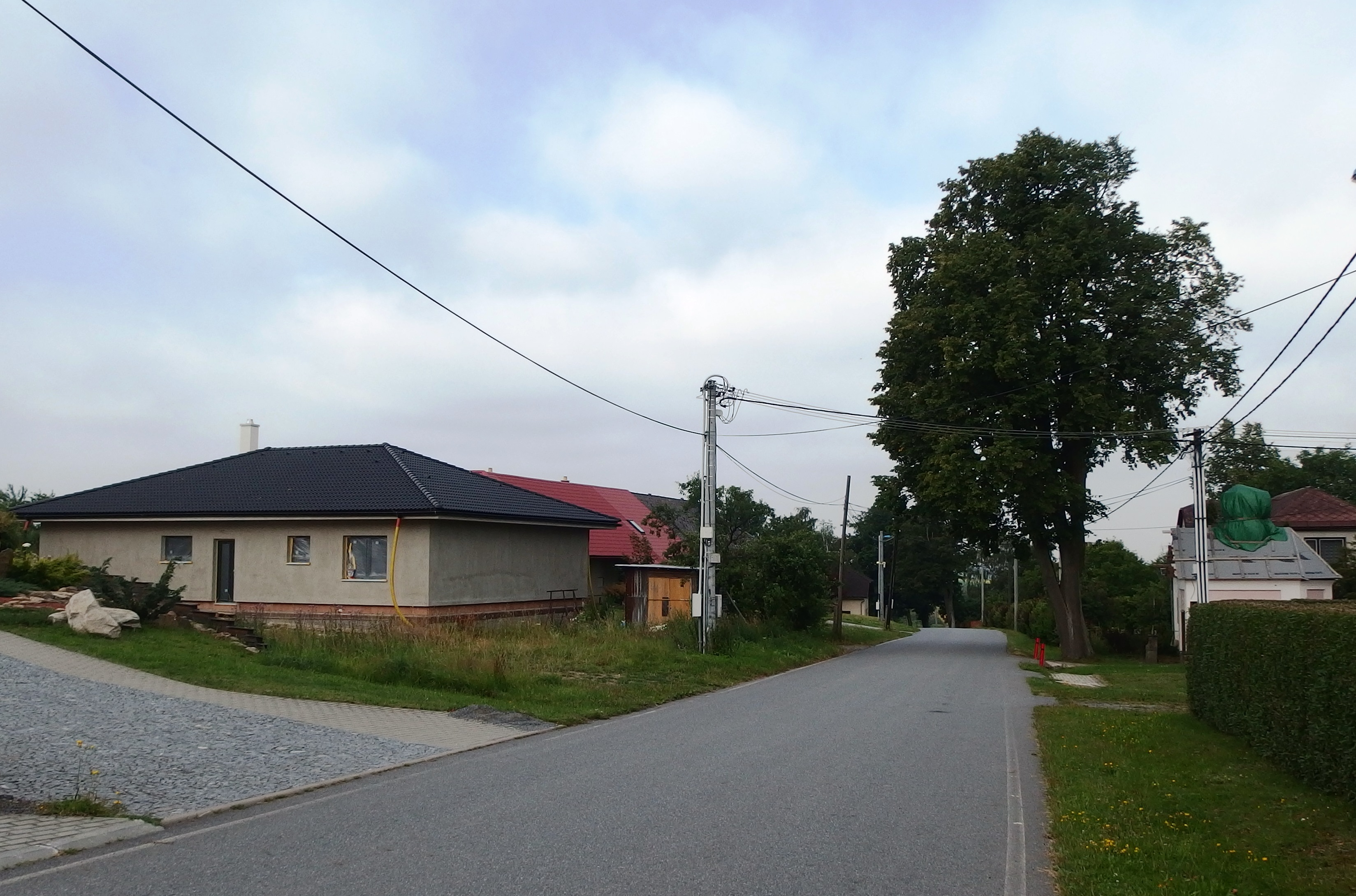
- Main road in the village

- Location in the Czech Republic
- Coordinates: 49°33′34″N 15°59′5″E
- Country: Czech Republic
- Region: Vysočina
- District: Žďár nad Sázavou
- Municipality: Žďár nad Sázavou
- First mentioned: 1407

Area
  - Total: 3.59 km^{2} (1.39 sq mi)
- Elevation: 645 m (2,116 ft)

Population (2021)
  - Total: 127
  - Density: 35.4/km^{2} (91.6/sq mi)
- Time zone: UTC+1 (CET)
  - Summer (DST): UTC+2 (CEST)
- Postal code: 591 01
- Website: melkovice.cz

Mělkovice (German: Melkowitz) is a village and municipal part of Žďár nad Sázavou in Žďár nad Sázavou District in the Vysočina Region of the Czech Republic. It has about 120 inhabitants. It is located in the eastern part of the town's territory.

== History ==
The first written mention of Mělkovice is in a local urbarium from 1407. Further mentions date from the 16th century. Since 1670s, the land was administered by local manorial lords, which sold the land after the dissolution of Žďár Monastery.

Since 1850, Mělkovice has been a municipal part of Žďár nad Sázavou.

== Demographics ==
Historical population

Year	Pop.	±%
1890	95	—
1900	80	−15.8%
1910	97	+21.2%
1921	–	—
1930	78	—

Year	Pop.	±%
1950	–	—
1961	84	—
1970	76	−9.5%
1980	73	−3.9%
1991	62	−15.1%

Year	Pop.	±%
2001	63	+1.6%
2011	86	+36.5%
2021	127	+47.7%

Source: Censuses

== Transport ==
The I/19 road from Žďár nad Sázavou to Boskovice runs next to the village.

The railway line from Žďár nad Sázavou to Tišnov passes next to Mělkovice, but there is no train station.

== Sights ==
There are no protected cultural monuments in the municipality. In the centre of the village is the Chapel of Saint Anne, reconstructed in 1998.
