= Peter Zaťko =

Peter Zaťko may refer to:

- Peter Zaťko (economist) (1903–1978), Slovak economist
- Peter Zaťko (wheelchair curler) (born 1983), Slovak wheelchair curler

== See also ==
- Peiter Zatko, American network security expert, programmer, and hacker
