= Koloman Sokol =

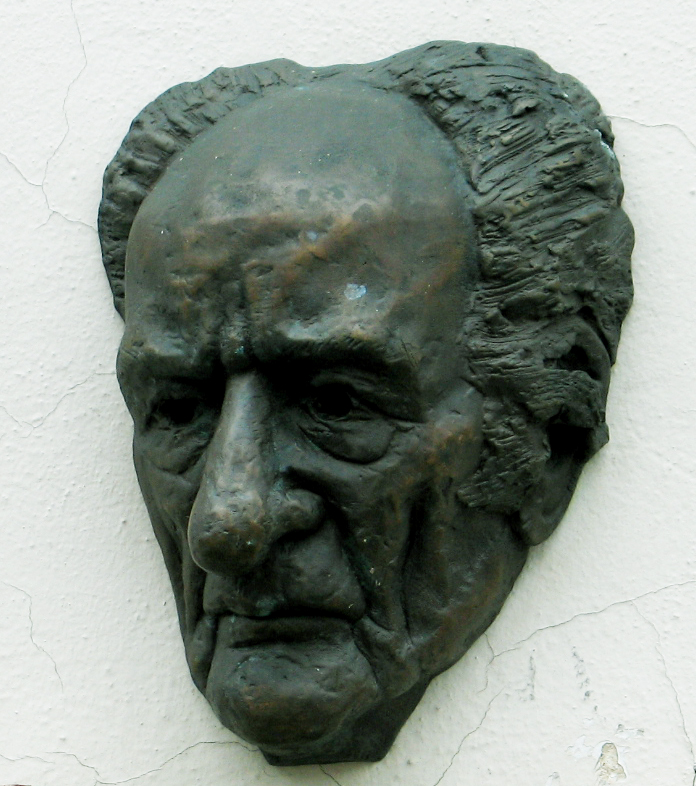
Koloman Sokol

Koloman Sokol (12 December 1902 – 12 January 2003) was one of the most prominent Slovak painters, graphic artists and illustrators. He was a founder of modern Slovak graphic art.

== Biography ==
Koloman Sokol was born in Liptovský Mikuláš. He attended the private schools of Eugen Krón in Košice and Gustáv Mallý in Bratislava, as well as the Academy of Fine Arts in Prague, where he studied under Max Švabinský and Tavik Frantisek Simon. In Czechoslovakia, he became a member in the SČUG Hollar, an association of Czechoslovak graphic artist. Following a brief period of study with František Kupka in Paris, he accepted an invitation from the Mexican Ministry of Culture and Education to teach his work. He became a professor of graphic techniques at the Escuela de las Artes del Libro, which he helped found in 1938, and at the University of Mexico City from 1937 to 1941.

Between 1942 and 1946 he lived in New York City. In 1946 he returned to Slovakia, where he taught at the Slovak University of Technology and at the Comenius University. In 1948 (when the Communists took power in Czechoslovakia) he left for the United States again. He settled in Bryn Mawr, a suburb of Philadelphia. From the 1960s he lived reclusively and created a special symbolical-mythological style during this period. In the 1990s he lived in Tucson, Arizona, where he died at the age of 100.

== Style ==
Sokol's work was inspired by Vincent van Gogh, Käthe Kollwitz, George Grosz, and strongly by the expressionism of the Die Brücke Group. Initially, he concentrated on graphic techniques, which he later enriched by drawing and painting in Mexico. His paintings are often dramatic in presentation which led to the belief that he created a Slovak variation of expressionism at a European level. He remained true to the limits of graphic art in terms of form and shape. Artistic, ethnic, and social aspects merge in his work. Although the primary motive of his works was man, social motives dominate his expressive work and this tendency equates to the hard and harsh style of his engravings and drawings. His works frequently depicted suffering, penury and human pain. He also created numerous woodcuts.

== Works ==
His most important works are:

- Za cieľom - baníci (Towards the goal - miners)
- Traja králi (The Three Magi)
- Bača (Shepherd)
- Nárek (Lamentation)
- Nový mexický zákon (New Mexican Act)
- Bitka žien (Women's Fight)
- Matka s dieťaťom (A mother with child)
- Na ceste (On the road)
- Stretnutie (Meeting)
- Odsúdená (Condemned)
- Starý pltník (The old raftsman)
- V ateliéri (In the studio)
- V uličke (In a little street)

== Honours ==
- Slovakia : Grand Cross (or 1st Class) of the Order of the White Double Cross (2003)
- Czech Republic : Order of Tomáš Garrigue Masaryk
