= Gustáv Papp =

Gustáv Papp (28 September 1919 – 7 October 1997) was a Slovak operatic tenor who had an active international career during the 1940s through the 1980s. He was notably a leading artist at the Slovak National Theatre in Bratislava from 1948 through 1987. He made a number of recordings made on the Supraphon label and also worked for many years as a medical doctor.

== Biography ==
Born in Čierny Balog, Papp studied medicine at the University of Bratislava and passed his medical exams, becoming a Doctor of Medicine in 1944. For many years he worked as a doctor in addition to performing. While specializing in general surgery he became increasingly interested in opera and eventually entered the Bratislava Conservatory in 1940 where he studied singing with D. Žuravlevová through 1947. He later pursued further studies at the Vienna Music Academy.

Papp made his professional opera debut in 1948 at the Slovak National Theatre (SNT) as Don José in Georges Bizet's Carmen. He returned frequently to the theatre through 1955 as a guest artist and then was a member at the house from 1955 through 1987. His extensive stage repertoire at the SNT encompassed mainly heroic tenor roles from the Italian and German repertories and a total of 21 Slovak opera roles. He notably created roles in the world premieres of several operas by composer Ján Cikker, including the title roles in Juro Jánošík (1954) and Beg Bajazid (1957) and parts in Vzkriesenie (1962) and Zo života hmyzu (1987). Some of his other stage roles included Básnik in Peter Zvon's Tanec nad plačom, Ondrej Zimoň in Eugen Suchoň's Krútňava, Prince Vasiliy Ivanovich Shuysky in Modest Mussorgsky's Boris Godunov, and the title role Giuseppe Verdi's Otello.

On the international stage Papp was a member at the opera house in Leipzig, Germany from 1960 to 1966. He also portrayed a number Wagnerian heroes as a guest artist at the Semperoper in Dresden. He was highly esteemed concert singer and gave successful concert tours throughout Belgium, Czechoslovakia, Hungary, Italy, the Soviet Union, and Yugoslavia. In 1966, he was awarded the USSR State Prize and in 1968 he was named a Meritorious Artist. In 1991 he was decorated with the Order of Tomáš Garrigue Masaryk by the State of Czechoslovakia.

After his retirement from the stage in 1987, Papp worked as a voice teacher in Bratislava for many years. He was married to Eva Pappová. He died in Bratislava.

== Bibliography ==
- Karl Josef Kutsch, Leo Riemens: Großes Sängerlexikon. Elektronische Ausgabe der dritten, erweiterten Auflage. Bern und München 1999/2000. Directmedia, Berlin 2004, ISBN 3-89853-433-2, Article: Papp, Gustáv, Tenor. (German)
