= Oto Mádr =

Czech Roman Catholic priest, theologian (1917-2011)

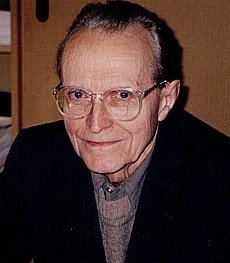
Oto Mádr

Mons. ThDr. Oto Mádr, dr. h. c. (15 February 1917 – 27 February 2011) was a Czech Roman Catholic priest, theologian, university professor, long-time political prisoner and the chief editor of Theological Texts (Czech: Teologické texty).

== Life ==
Mádr studied at the Archbishop's high school in the Bubeneč district of Prague, before continuing his education at the Charles University School of Theology (1936–1939). He was ordained as a priest in 1942 and began as a parish priest. After the end of World War II, he continued his study of moral theology at the Gregorian University in Rome (1948–1949). He then returned to Czechoslovakia, where he was awarded the title of Doctor of Theology for his study on the works of Francisco Suárez. He remained active in the management of his parish, but also worked as a high-school teacher and was a prominent figure in the circles of Catholic Action. He was a youth pastor in the church of The Most Holy Saviour in 1950. He was arrested in May 1951 and sentenced to life imprisonment for alleged espionage for the Vatican and organization of illegal religious activity, in a miscarriage of justice.

After release on probation in 1966, he worked in various blue-collar jobs. He returned briefly in 1968 to the Charles University School of Theology and was fully rehabilitated in 1970 (his rehabilitation was cancelled in 1975, and renewed in 1990). He was sent to a parish in the border areas in 1970 (Dolní Žandov near Cheb), and he returned to Prague only as a pensioner in 1978.

However, he did not retire from his theological work, and was one of the main organizers of the Catholic samizdat. He continued in his collaboration with exiles, maintained relationships with foreign visitors, and participated in the preparation of secretly ordained priests and in the organization of theological colloquia at home. He was one of the main advisers to František Tomášek (from 1968), writing a couple of fundamental texts for him, which Tomášek published under his name.

Mádr published the journal Theological Texts (Czech: Teologické texty) from 1978, first as samizdat, then after the Velvet Revolution as a normal revue. He published tens of books in samizdat, mainly translations.

He returned to the Charles University School of Theology with his friend Josef Zvěřina in 1990, but after Zvěřina's death the same year he was again removed, returning permanently only after a change in the leadership of the school in 2002. He received an honorary degree in 1991 from the University of Bonn and was awarded the Order of Tomáš Garrigue Masaryk III. class in 1997. He was a canon of the Vyšehrad chapter from 1999.

== Work ==
Aside from hundreds of articles, reviews and specialized essays in journals and compilations in the Czech Republic as well as abroad, he published these books:

- 1992: The Word About This Time [Slovo o této době]. Zvon, Praha
- 1993: Wie Kirche nicht stirbt. Leipzig
- 2003: To the core of the matter: current reflections from years 1993-2003 [K jádru věci: aktuální reflexe z let 1993-2003]. Vyšehrad, Praha
- 2007: In the struggles for the God's issues [V zápasech za Boží věc]. Vyšehrad, Praha, ISBN 978-80-7021-876-1.
