= Josefina Napravilová =

Czech humanitarian

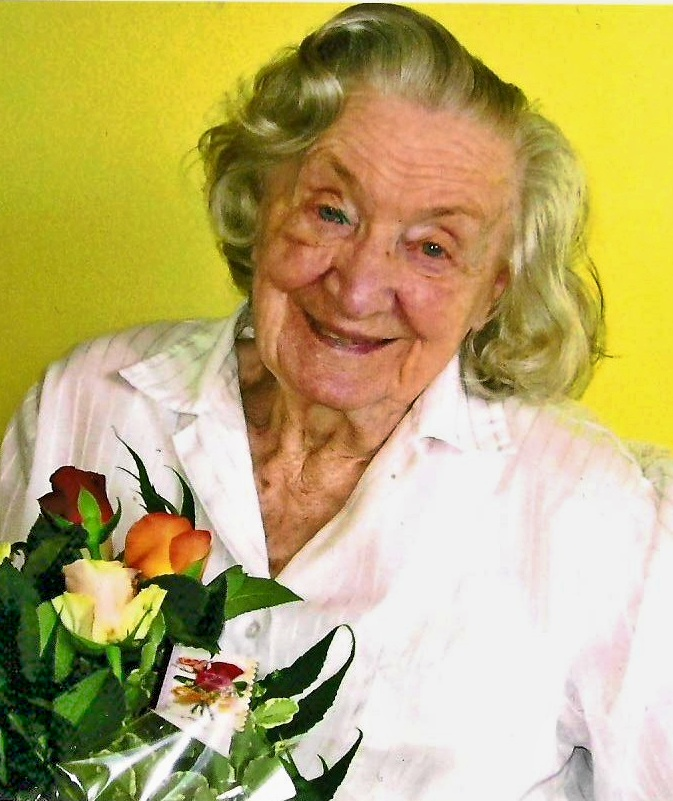
- Born: 21 January 1914; Plzeň, Austria-Hungary
- Died: 19 February 2014 (aged 100); Tábor, Czech Republic
- Known for: reuniting children after WWII

Josefina Napravilová (21 January 1914 – 19 February 2014) was a Czech humanitarian. She worked with child refugees after the Second World War. She was awarded the Order of Tomáš Garrigue Masaryk in 2009.

== Biography ==
Napravilová was born in Plzeň in 1914. She started her most remarkable work after the Second World War when she began reuniting Czech children with their families after they had been separated by actions in the war. She would wander into camps and call out the Czech words for Mum and Dad to find out who answered.

She reunited between thirty and forty children. Amongst these was Vaclav Hanf who had the dubious claim of being one of the few children to survive the extermination of the village of Lidice in June 1942. He had been taken to Germany to be adopted by a German family at the age of eleven. He returned to find his village razed to the ground, his parents murdered but his sisters were miraculously alive. Other children had been moved to Germany after their parents had either been executed for involvement with the resistance or sent to concentration camps.

In 1947 she moved to Vienna, where husband had been given stolen property. He only lived a short time and she worked for the International Refugee Organization, where she was again assisting refugees but this time from communism. She moved to Canada in 1947 and after a career in banking she returned to her home country after the fall of the Soviet empire and she went to live in Bechyně. Her wartime exploits only came to notice because Vaclav Hanf remembered her pivotal role in his life.

In 1995 she was awarded the Order of Tomáš Garrigue Masaryk Class III in 2009.

Napravilová lived to see her 100th birthday and died the following month in Tábor in 2014.
