= Gustáv Mallý =

Slovak painter (1879–1952)

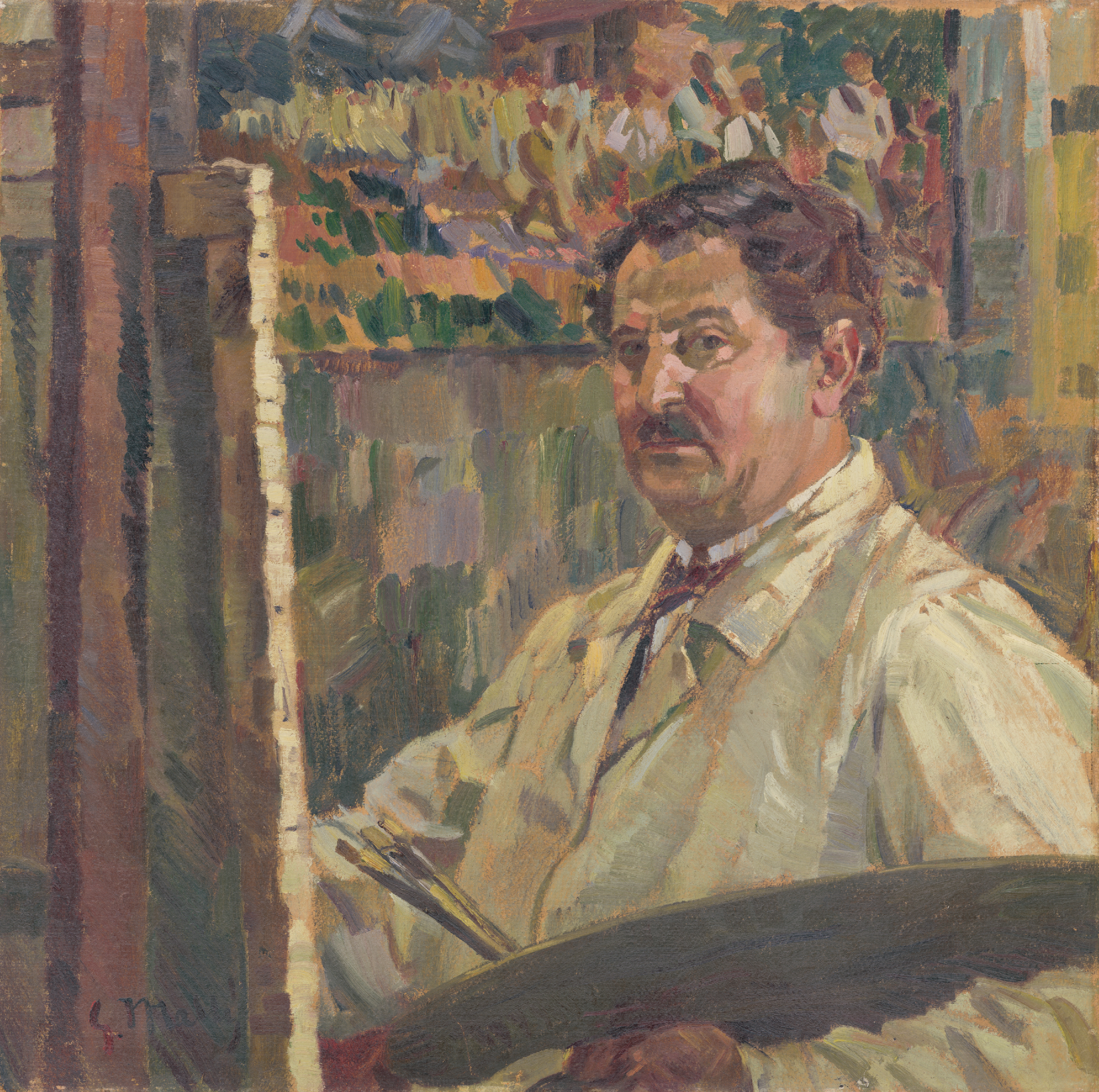
Self-portrait (1924)

Gustáv Mallý (21 May 1879 – 3 August 1952) was a Slovak painter. He worked in the Academic and Expressionist styles.

== Biography ==
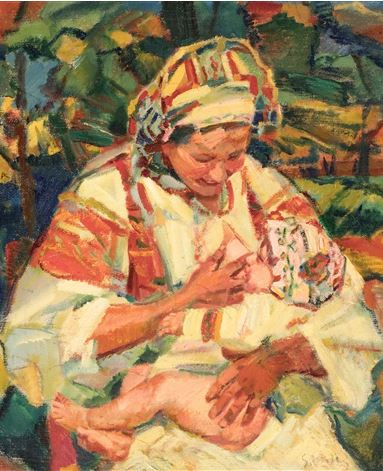
Mother and Child

Gustáv Mallý was born on 21 May 1879 in Vienna. His father was a tradesman, working in Austria. At the age of seven, his family returned home and settled in Skalica. From 1894 to 1896, he received his first artistic training in Prague with Karel Záhorský, a Czech portrait and mural painter. This was followed by two years at the School of Applied Arts, and completed by two years at the Dresden Academy of Fine Arts.

From 1901 to 1902, he made a study trip to the United States. Upon returning home, he got married and settled in Trlinok (now Vinosady). In 1903, together with Jaroslav Augusta and Emil Pacovský, he founded a group of Hungarian-Slovakian artists, based in Žilina, and organized their first exhibition.

In 1908, he moved his family to Pezinok. Three years later, he established a private art school in Bratislava. His notable students included Ľudovít Fulla, Koloman Sokol, Ján Mudroch, Ján Želibský, Cyprián Majerník, Lea Mrázová and Ester Šimerová-Martinčeková.

He was one of the founders of the Union of Slovak Artists (1919), based in Martin. Two years later, he helped create the Slovak Art Forum in Bratislava. His first major exhibit outside of Slovakia was held in Warsaw in 1933, where he was awarded honorable mention.

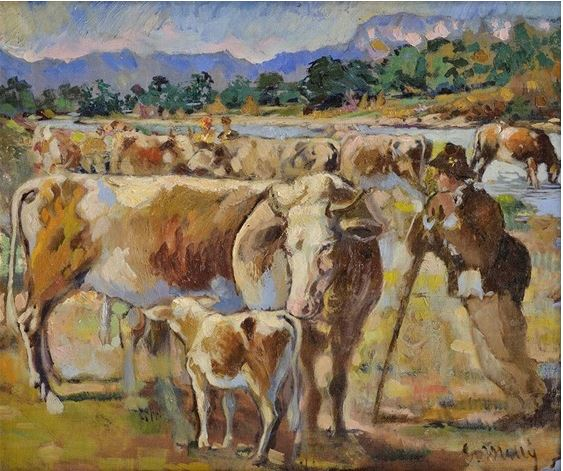
Herder Watering His Cows

In 1941, thanks to a nomination by his fellow artist Martin Benka, he was appointed head of the drawing and painting department at the Slovak University of Technology. He was promoted to Professor of visual education at Comenius University in 1946, but was forced to resign three years later, due to poor health. He died on 3 August 1952 in Bratislava, at the age of 73.

Many of his works may be seen at the Slovak National Gallery.
