= Měnín =

- Municipality
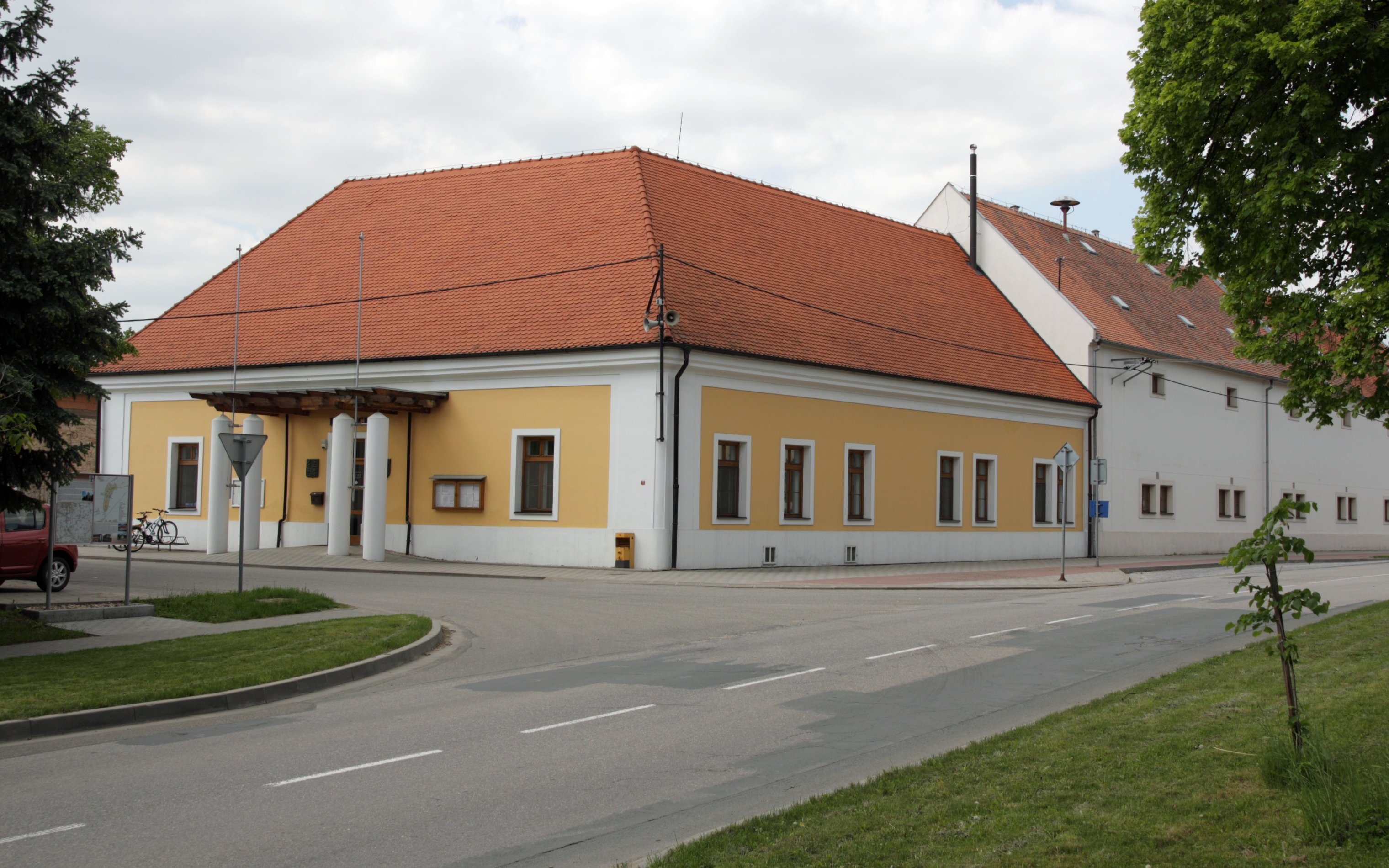
- Municipal office

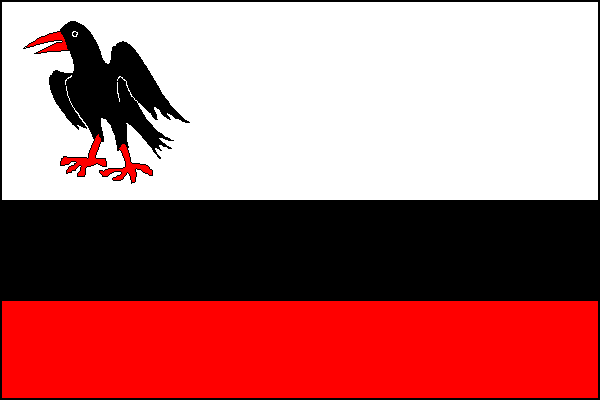
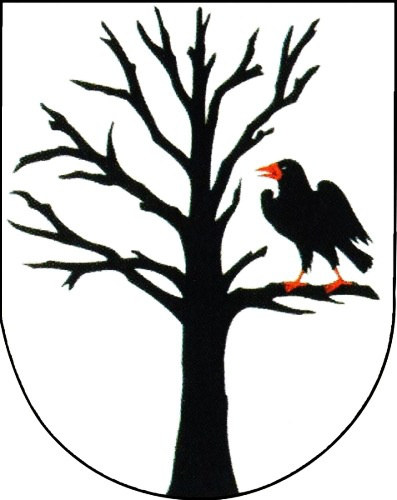
- Flag Coat of arms

- Location in the Czech Republic
- Coordinates: 49°4′57″N 16°41′39″E
- Country: Czech Republic
- Region: South Moravian
- District: Brno-Country
- First mentioned: 1240

Area
  - Total: 21.16 km^{2} (8.17 sq mi)
- Elevation: 188 m (617 ft)

Population (2026-01-01)
  - Total: 1,902
  - Density: 89.89/km^{2} (232.8/sq mi)
- Time zone: UTC+1 (CET)
  - Summer (DST): UTC+2 (CEST)
- Postal code: 664 57
- Website: www.menin.cz

Měnín (German: Mönitz) is a municipality and village in Brno-Country District in the South Moravian Region of the Czech Republic. It has about 1,900 inhabitants.

Měnín lies approximately 15 kilometres (9 mi) south of Brno and 199 km (124 mi) south-east of Prague.

== Demographics ==
Historical population
Year	Pop.	±%
1869	954	—
1880	1,111	+16.5%
1890	1,147	+3.2%
1900	1,264	+10.2%
1910	1,352	+7.0%
1921	1,351	−0.1%
1930	1,430	+5.8%
1950	1,378	−3.6%
1961	1,470	+6.7%
1970	1,503	+2.2%
1980	1,500	−0.2%
1991	1,578	+5.2%
2001	1,664	+5.4%
2011	1,696	+1.9%
2021	1,848	+9.0%
Source: Censuses

== Notable people ==
- Mojmír Povolný (1921–2012), lawyer and politician
- Jaroslav Konečný (1945–2017), handball player
