= Marie Provazníková =

Czech educator (1890–1991)

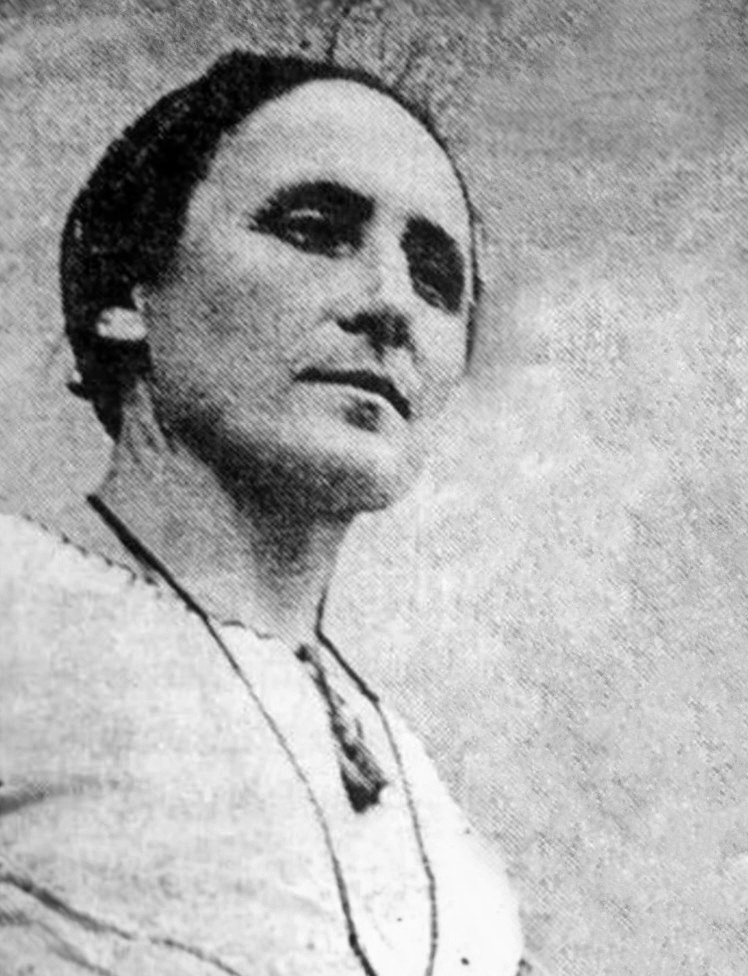
- Provazníková before 1932
- Born: Marie Kaloušová; 24 October 1890; Prague, Austria-Hungary
- Died: 11 January 1991 (aged 100); Schenectady, New York, United States
- Occupation: Sports coach
- Spouse: František Provazník
- Children: Alena Polesná (nee Provazníková)

Marie Provazníková (24 October 1890 – 11 January 1991) was a Czechoslovak sports official active in the Sokol movement.

== Background ==
Marie Provazníková was born in Prague.

== Career ==
Provazníková was a coach of the Czechoslovak women's gymnastics team at the 1948 Summer Olympics in London where her team won the gold medal.

On 18 August 1948, she decided to defect, because of "lack of freedom" in her homeland brought about by the February coup.

After a few months' stay in London she moved to the United States and resided there for the rest of her life, teaching PE and organizing Sokol units in the United States and internationally.

She lived to see the 1989 Velvet revolution and greeted with enthusiasm the revival of the Czechoslovak Sokol movement after four decades of Communist suppression.

== Death ==
Provazníková died at the age of 100 in Schenectady, New York.

== Awards ==
In 1948, Provazníková won a gold medal in women's gymnastics.

In 1992 she was awarded the Order of Tomáš Garrigue Masaryk, in memoriam, class III.

== Publications ==
- (Co-authored by PECHLÁTOVÁ, Z.) Cvičení žen na kladinách. In: PECHLÁTOVÁ, Z. et al. Cvičení družstev ČOS v Lille v květnu 1921. Praha: Čsl. obec sokolská, 1921. 55 p. Sbírka sokolských veřejných vystoupení; I.
- Příprava na závody žen a dorostenek při IX. sletu všesokolském 1932. V Praze: Československá Obec Sokolská, 1931. 168 p. Knihovna cvičitelů sokolských; Volume 55.
- Dvanáct cvičebních hodin v tělocvičně. V Praze: Československá Obec Sokolská, 1931. 218 p. Knihovna cvičitelů sokolských; Vol. 52.
- Příprava na závody žen a dorostenek: poprvé vydáno k IX. sletu všesokolskému 1932: schváleno náčelnictvem žen ČOS na schůzi dne 27. listopadu 1931. 2nd ed. V Praze: Československá obec sokolská, 1932. 168 p. Knihovna cvičitelů sokolských; vol. 55.
- (Co-authored by PELIKÁN, J.) Napodobivá cvičení nejmladšího žactva (od 6 do 9 let). V Praze: Československá obec sokolská, 1932. 43 - [I] p. Sbírka společných cvičení IX. sletu všesokolského v Praze r. 1932; No. 8.
- Prostná v příkladech. V Praze: Československá obec sokolská, 1933. 193 p. Knihovna cvičitelů sokolských; Vol. 62.
- Dvanáct cvičebních hodin v tělocvičně. 2nd ed. Praha: Česká obec sokolská, 1933. 219 p. Knihovna cvičitelů sokolských; vol. 52.
- (Co-authored by ROUBÍČKOVÁ, R., CIRPS, A.) Ženy a brannost: ochrana domácnosti při leteckém útoku. V Brně: Akce pro kulturní a politické uvědomování žen, [1937]. 24 p.
- Branná výchova sokolských žen. V Praze: Československá obec sokolská, 1937. 109, [II] p.
- Branná výchova sokolských žen. 2nd ed. V Praze: Československá obec sokolská, 1937. 110 p.
- Příprava žen v jednotách a v župách k X. všesokolskému sletu v Praze 1938. V Praze: Československá obec sokolská, 1938. 54, [2] p. Pokyny k X. všesokolskému sletu v Praze 1938; [No. 11]. Introduction by M. Provazníková
- Příprava dorostenek k X. všesokolskému sletu v Praze 1938. V Praze: Československá obec sokolská, 1938. 61, [1] p. Pokyny k X. všesokolskému sletu v Praze 1938; [No. 5]. Introduction by M. Provazníková
- Začátečnice: Cvičení žen a dorostenek I. stupně výcviku v zařízené tělocvičně. V Praze: Knihkupectví a nakladatelství Obce sokolské, 1939. 110 p.
- Táboření sokolských dorostenek a žen. Praha: Nakladatelství Obce sokolské, 1939. 169 p.
- (Co-authored by KOVÁŘOVÁ, L.) Příprava na závody žen středního a vyššího oddílu. V Praze: Knihkupectví a nakladatelství ČOS, 1940. 125 - [II] p.
- Podaly jste mi ruce, mé sestry. V Praze: Marie Provazníková, 1940. 23, [ii] p.
- Druhý stupeň cvičení žen a dorostenek v zařízené tělocvičně. V Praze: Knihkupectví a nakladatelství Obce sokolské, 1940. 120, [IV] p.
- Studentka Věra. 1st ed. Praha: V. Šeba, 1947. 134 p.
- Rádce sokolských činovníků. New York: Ústředí čsl. sokolstva v zahraničí, 1974. 67, v p.
- PROVAZNÍKOVÁ, M., ed. and ŠKVOR, J., ed. 11. všesokolský slet v Praze 1948. 1st ed. Curych: Konfrontace, 1976. 99 p. Knižnice Konfrontace.
- (Co-authored by ZABKA, N. B.) Gymnastic activities with hand apparatus for girls and boys: (ages 6-12 years). 4th printing. [Minneapolis, Minnesota]: [Burges publishing company], 1977. 7, 123 p.
- (Co-authored by TYRŠ, M.) Výklad Tyršovy soustavy a názvosloví; Doplněno článkem Miroslava Tyrše O tělocvičné soustavě sokolské. 1st ed. Salem: self-published, 1985. 125 p.
- To byl Sokol. München: České Slovo, 1988. 252 p.
- To byl sokol [audiobook]. Praha: Knihovna a tiskárna pro nevidomé K. E. Macana, 1991. 1 zvuková deska (12:20:47).
