= Cyprián Majerník =

Slovak painter (1909–1945)

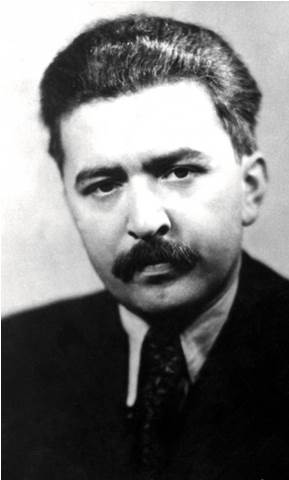
Cyprián Majerník in 1944

Cyprián Majerník (24 November 1909 – 4 July 1945) was a Slovak painter. He worked in Prague and was associated with the "Generation of 1909".

== Biography ==
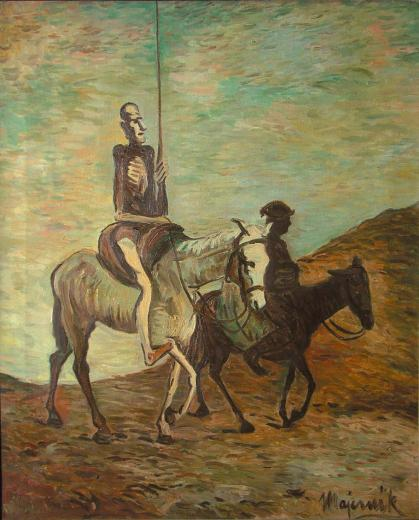
Don Quixote and Sancho Panza

Majerník was born on 24 November 1909 in Veľké Kostoľany. He had his primary education in Pezinok then, in 1924, attended the secondary school in Košice, where he studied economics. After deciding on art as a career, he went to Bratislava to take private lessons from the Expressionist painter Gustáv Mallý. After acquiring the basics, he enrolled at the Academy of Fine Arts, Prague, where he studied under Josef Loukota and Jakub Obrovský. Upon graduation, he settled in Prague.

In 1932, Majerník took a brief trip to Paris, where he came under the influence of Marc Chagall and Giorgio de Chirico. In Prague, he became part of a circle of painters that included Ján Želibský, Ján Mudroch and Jakub Bauernfreund. Although he centered his career there, he made numerous trips to Slovakia to visit his family and hold exhibitions.

About this time, Majerník was diagnosed with multiple sclerosis. Nevertheless, his work was energized by his opposition to Fascism. By 1942, this was virtually his only theme, as he protested the prison camps, death marches and other evils perpetrated by the Nazi régime. The figure of Don Quixote was a recurring motif of continued resistance, despite overwhelming odds against success.

Following the Soviet liberation of Prague in May, 1945, the Umělecká beseda (an artists' association) gave Majerník a certificate of political reliability. At that time, he also married his long-time companion, Karla, and applied for an apartment permit. Not long after on 4 July 1945, he committed suicide by jumping from a window. It is unknown what the immediate cause may have been, but he had recently experienced short bouts of depression, related to the increasing difficulty involved in holding and manipulating brushes.

A major retrospective was held the following year. In 1991, he was posthumously awarded the Order of Tomáš Garrigue Masaryk by President Václav Havel. A showing in honour of his 100th birthday was presented at Mirbach Palace in 2009.

Majerník is buried at Vyšehrad Cemetery. In 2011, there was a scandal when his grave was purchased by businessman Tomáš Rosen, but after the case was covered in the media, the grave was bought back and since 2015 the grave has been under the patronage of the city of Martin, Slovakia.

== Selected paintings ==
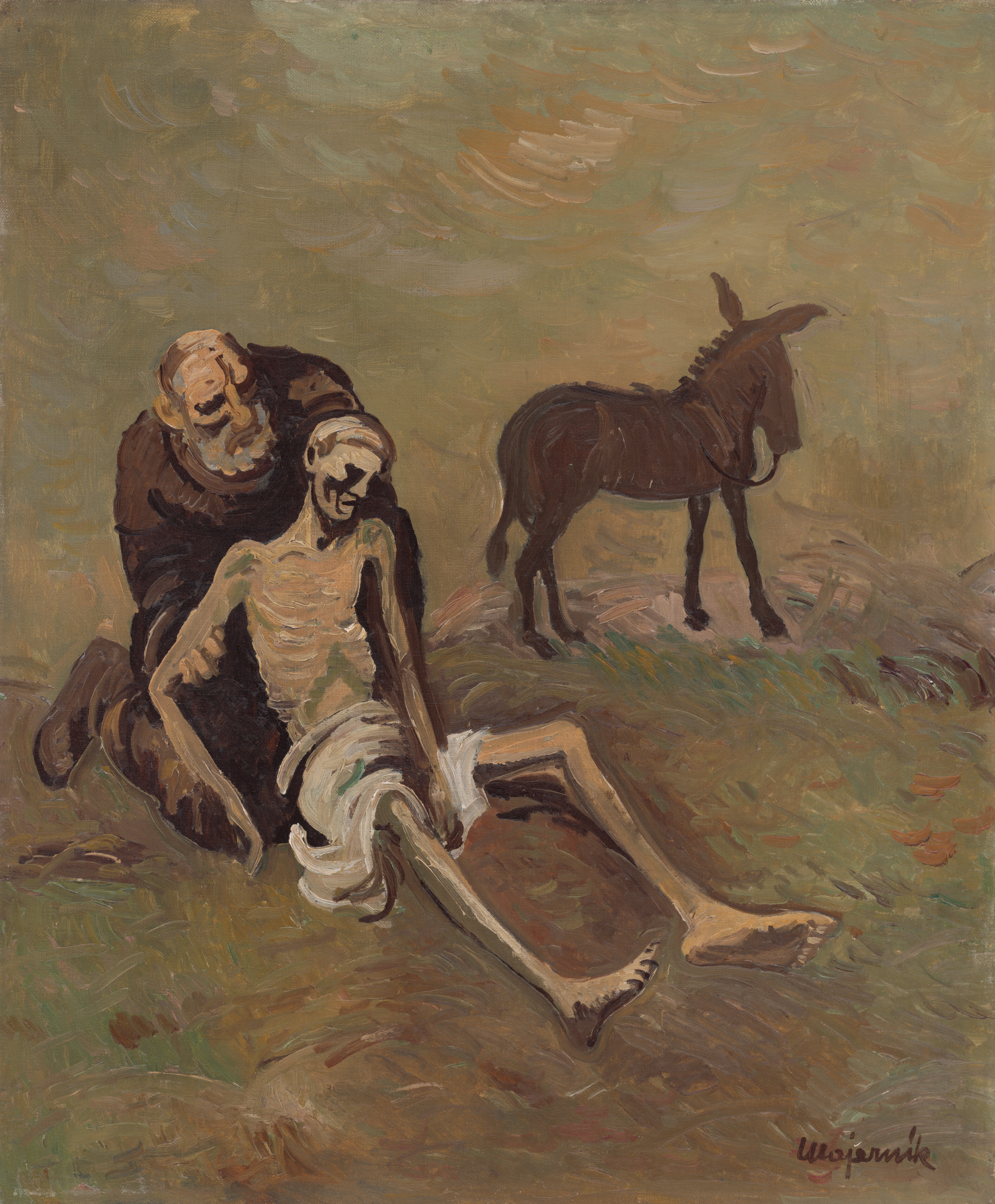
The Good Samaritan

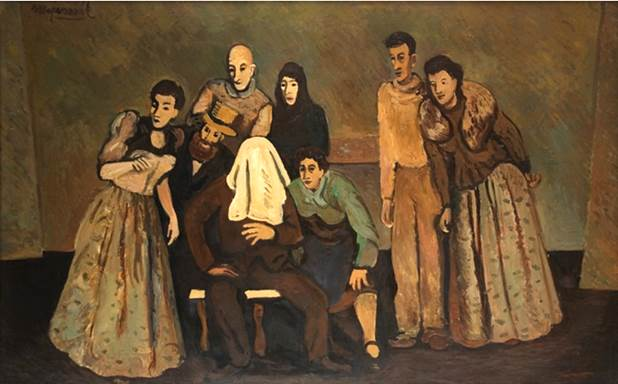
The Clairvoyant

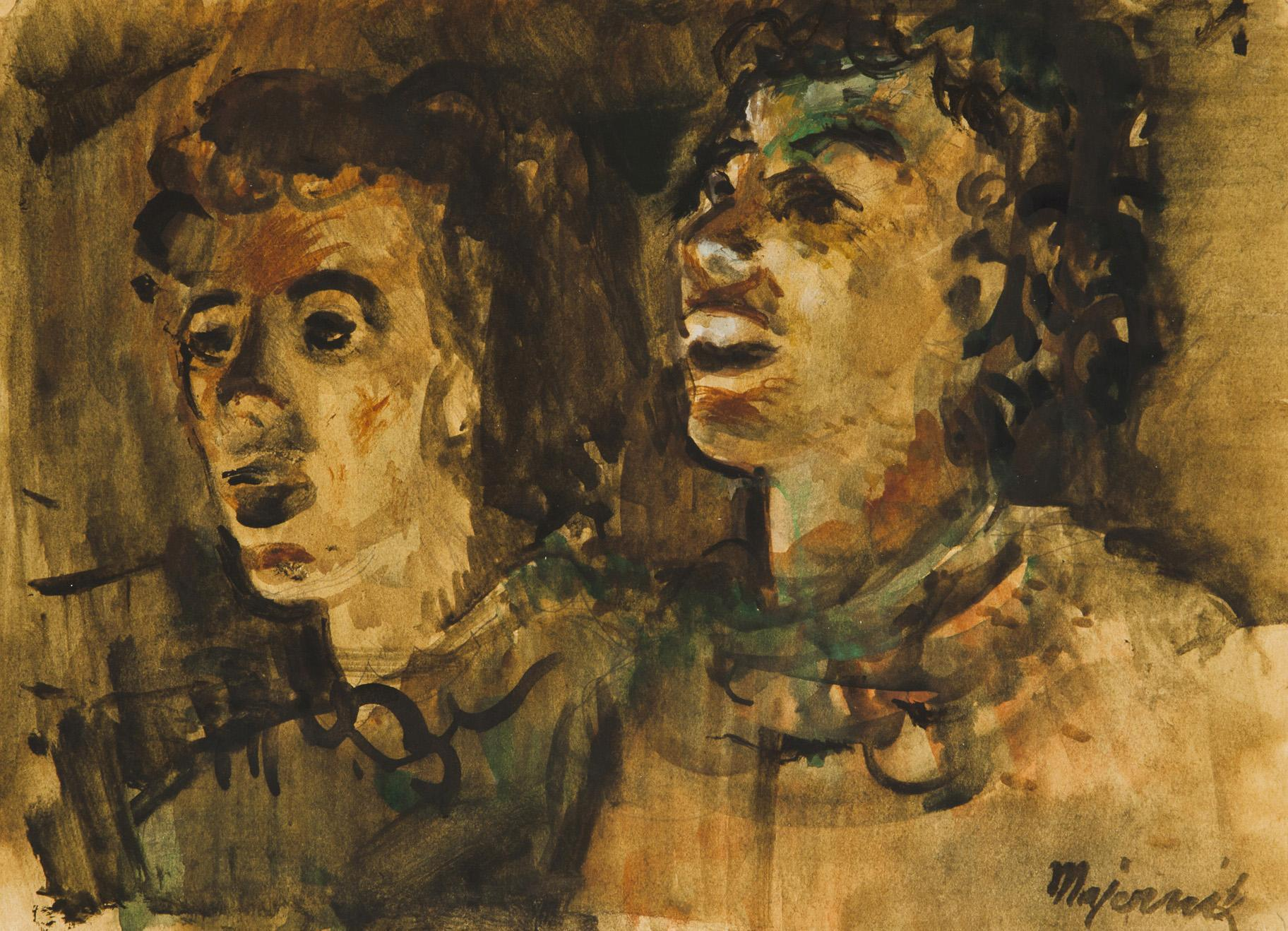
Singers

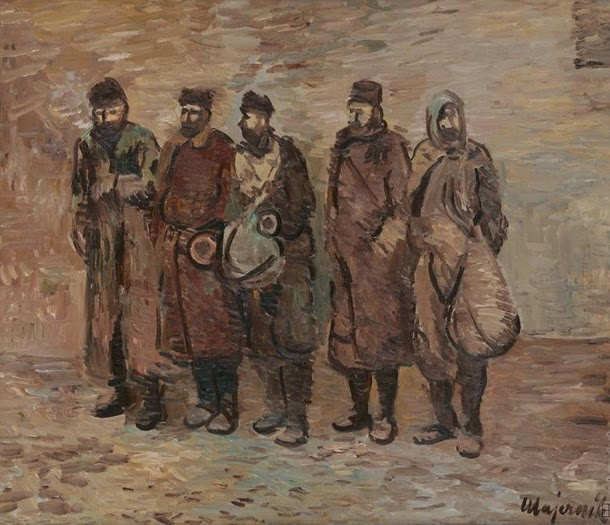
Prisoners
