= Mojmír Povolný =

Czech-born American academic

- Born: Mojmír Povolný; November 25, 1921; Měnín, Czechoslovakia
- Died: August 21, 2012 (aged 90); Appleton, Wisconsin, U.S.
- Occupations: President of Free Czechoslovakia (1974-1993), Emeritus Professor of Government at Lawrence University (1958-1987)
- Awards: Order of Tomáš Garrigue Masaryk

Academic background
- Education: Masaryk University School of Law (J.D.), University of Chicago (Ph.D.)

Academic work
- Institutions: Lawrence University

Mojmír Povolný (November 25, 1921 – August 21, 2012) was a Czech lawyer and politician. He was a professor of government at Lawrence University in Appleton, Wisconsin, from 1958 to 1987. He began his academic career with a J.D. degree from Masaryk University School of Law in Czechoslovakia. On August 21, 2012, Povolný died at home in Appleton. In the earlier part of his life, he was politically exiled for devoting a majority of his life to liberating Czechoslovakia from Communist and Soviet occupation. Povolný's service to Czechoslovakia was recognized by President Václav Havel in 1995 when he was presented with the Order of Tomáš Garrigue Masaryk.

== Personal life and education ==
Mojmír Povolný was born in Měnín, a Moravian village in what is now the Czech Republic, on November 25, 1921. He spent five years in elementary school, before going to a gymnasium, or prep school, for eight years. When Povolný finished gymnasium and was of age to attend university, the country was occupied by Nazi Germany and universities had been closed by the Germans. He worked in a factory until after the conflict, when he then went to university. Povolný took part in the Beneš Party's democratic youth movement during his college studies. In 1947, he earned a Juris Doctor degree in 2½ years from Masaryk University School of Law in Brno, Czechoslovakia. Shortly after graduation, he served as the executive secretary of its Economic Council in Prague for about one year. From 1974 to 1993, Povolný was the President of the Council of Free Czechoslovakia. In 1948, shortly after the Communist coup d'état in April, Povolný fled to Paris.

While Povolný was in Paris, he studied international law at the Institute of Higher International Studies and worked as an assistant for the European Director of the Carnegie Endowment for International Peace. In 1950, he migrated to the United States and received his PhD in international relations from the University of Chicago in 1954. In 1957, he joined the faculty at Lawrence University where he taught government for 30 years. He received an honorary degree from Masaryk University in 1992.

Mojmír married his wife Joyce on July 15, 1956, and had two children (David and Daniel), ten grandchildren and four great-grandchildren.

== Academic career ==
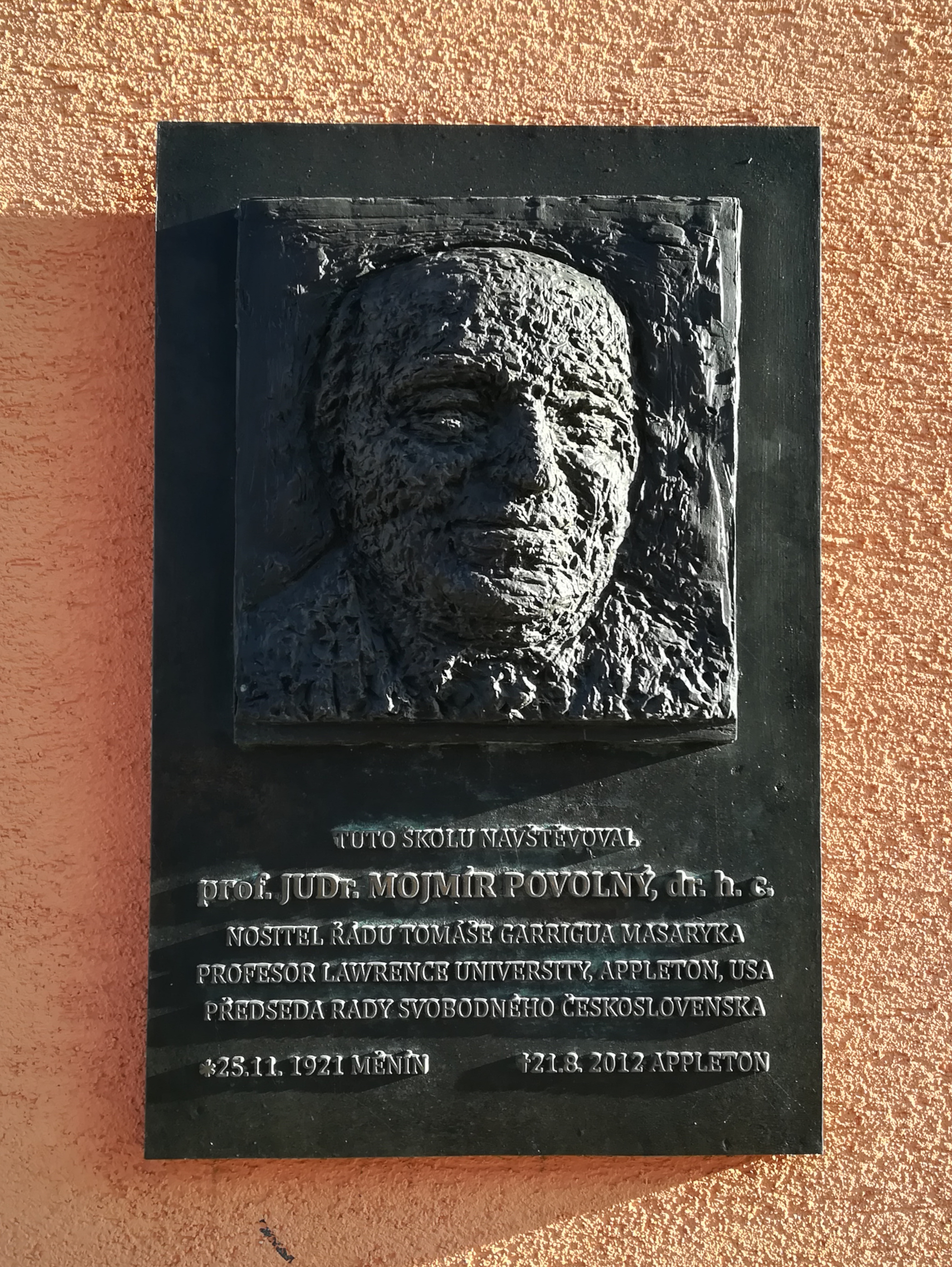
Plaque commemorating Mojmír Povolný at Měnín elementary school.

Povolný began his academic career in Czechoslovakia, where he earned J.D. degree from Masaryk University School of Law. After arriving in the United States, he earned a Ph.D. in international relations at the University of Chicago and later taught there for one year (1956–57) before becoming a professor of government at Lawrence University in Appleton, Wisconsin, from 1958 to 1987. During winter 1958, he commuted from Chicago to teach a course in politics at Lawrence University while also teaching at the University of Chicago three times a week before he began teaching full-time at Lawrence in September the same year.

During his career at Lawrence, Povolný taught courses in international politics, international law, international organizations and Soviet politics, but he was also heavily involved in the college in other ways. He became the chair of The Select Committee on Planning in 1969, where he was a key figure in restructuring the institutional plan for liberal arts education at Lawrence. He led more than 50 Lawrence University mentees during his tenure, and was honored with the Lawrence University Award for Excellence in Teaching in 1986.

On his retirement in 1987, Povolný was praised for his service as an "academic dean, department chair, wise counselor to presidents, confidant to colleagues, pedagogical innovator, scholar, and, above all, generous guide and teacher to students" and the university made two dedications in honor of his retirement. One was The Mojimir Povolny Prize in Government, an award annually granted to an outstanding senior in the government department. Secondly, an annual lecture series named in his honor that was purposed to highlight the improvement of global cooperation was established in 1987. Notable speakers include the journalist Peter Copeland and the former Wisconsin Department of Natural Resources Secretary George Meyer. The Lawrence University Povolny Lecture Series encourages student engagement with the ethical dimensions surrounding political science and government. In the lectures, presenters debate topics such as politics, economics and culture in a global world view, and work to find a balance between government control and corporate freedom to prevent harm to the environment while keeping business competitiveness intact.

== Involvement in Czech politics ==
From 1947 to 1948, Povolný carried out his role as "executive secretary of its Economic Council in Prague" with the Beneš Party's democratic youth movement. After the communist takeover of Czechoslovakia and the Communist coup d'état, Povolný escaped the country with the help of supportive representatives of the Communist secret police in April 1948.

=== Involvement in Czech politics while in United States ===
After escaping Czechoslovakia to the United States, Povolný continued to be involved in its politics.

Shortly after his flight from Czechoslovakia, he and a few of his former and current students created a magazine and wrote memoranda, appealing to a wide range of organizations from the United Nations down to any small ones for help against the Communist regime in Czechoslovakia.

In 1974, Povolný was elected as Chair of the Council of Free Czechoslovakia in New York City and held that chair until the fall of the communist regime in during the Velvet Revolution in 1989. This council was set up in order to help with the liberation of Czechoslovakia from communism. At the end of his time as chairman, he returned to the Czech Republic to help with the reconstruction of Czechoslovakia's civil society at the request of the Czech government. Part of the effort was to establish political science in the Czech Republic after November 1989.

In the early 1990s, Povolný became a member of the Board of Consultants of the President of the Republic and on, October 28, 1995, was presented with the Tomáš Garrigue Masaryk Order, the Czech Republic's highest civilian honor, for "his service to democracy and human rights".

In addition, Povolný wrote a book that analyzed the contribution of exiled organizations in the 1970s and 1980s to support domestic dissent.
