= Lisková =

- Municipality
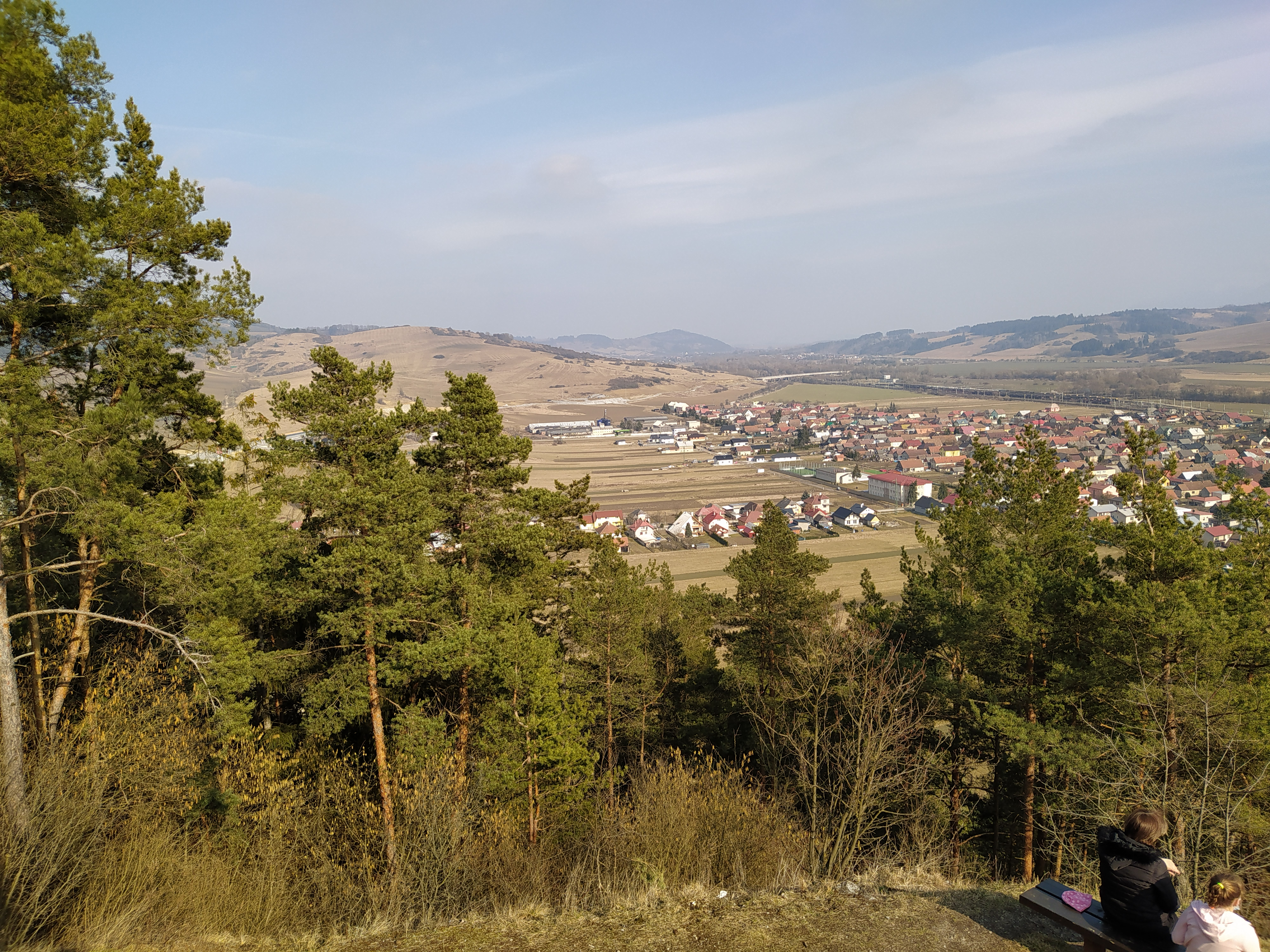

- Flag

- Location of Lisková in the Žilina Region Location of Lisková in Slovakia
- Coordinates: 49.09°N 19.35°E
- Country: Slovakia
- Region: Žilina Region
- District: Ružomberok District
- First mentioned: 1252

Area
  - Total: 15.53 km^{2} (6.00 sq mi)
- Elevation: 484 m (1,588 ft)

Population (2025)
  - Total: 1,986
- Time zone: UTC+1 (CET)
  - Summer (DST): UTC+2 (CEST)
- Postal code: 348 1
- Area code: +421 44
- Vehicle registration plate (until 2022): RK
- Website: www.liskova.sk

Lisková (Hungarian: Liszkófalu) is a village in the Ružomberok District of north-central Slovakia. It lies at an elevation of 484 m and has an area of 15.95 km^{2}. It had a population of 2,077 in 2011.

== Geography ==
The municipality lies at an altitude of 484 metres (1,588 ft) and covers an area of 15.53 km^{2} (6.00 sq mi) (2025).

== History ==
In historical records the village was first mentioned in 1252. Of interest is Lisková Cave, a 1,900 m Guttenstein limestone formation from the middle Triassic. A cultic statuette of a horned bull was found in the cave. Other finds include the remains of a copper-age secondary burial (Lengyel culture), stone tools, and a mammoth tooth. The finds included the forehead of a human skull, which was destroyed in 1956. The remains were the first evidence of Pleistocene settlement in the territory of present-day Slovakia.

== Population ==
Population statistic (10 years)
| Year | 1995 | 2005 | 2015 | 2025 |
|---|---|---|---|---|
| Count | 2093 | 2127 | 2105 | 1986 |
| Difference | | +1.62% | −1.03% | −5.65% |

Population statistic
| Year | 2024 | 2025 |
|---|---|---|
| Count | 1999 | 1986 |
| Difference | | −0.65% |

It has a population of 1986 people (31 December 2025).

=== Ethnicity ===
Census 2021 (1+ %)
| Ethnicity | Number | Fraction |
|---|---|---|
| Slovak | 2027 | 98.35% |
| Not found out | 26 | 1.26% |
| Total | 2061 | |

In year 2021 was 2061 people by ethnicity 2027 as Slovak, 26 as Not found out, 13 as Czech, 12 as Other, 4 as Russian, 2 as Hungarian, 1 as Serbian, 1 as Rusyn, 1 as Polish and 1 as Moravian.

Note on population: The difference values of population numbers in the table "Population statistic" and in the sections "Ethnicity" & "Religion" is caused by the use of various statistical methods.

=== Religion ===
Census 2021 (1+ %)
| Religion | Number | Fraction |
|---|---|---|
| Roman Catholic Church | 1585 | 76.9% |
| None | 215 | 10.43% |
| Evangelical Church | 198 | 9.61% |
| Not found out | 21 | 1.02% |
| Total | 2061 | |

In year 2021 was 2061 people by religion 1585 from Roman Catholic Church, 215 from None, 198 from Evangelical Church, 21 from Not found out, 16 from Greek Catholic Church, 10 from Ad hoc movements, 3 from Other and not ascertained christian church, 3 from Christian Congregations in Slovakia, 2 from Jewish community, 2 from Eastern Orthodox Church, 2 from Other, 1 from Calvinist Church, 1 from Paganism and natural spirituality, 1 from Hinduism and 1 from Buddhism.

== Notable people ==
Notable people that were born or lived in Lisková include:

- Vavro Šrobár (1867–1950), doctor and politician
