= Anton Štefánek =

Slovak politician and sociologist

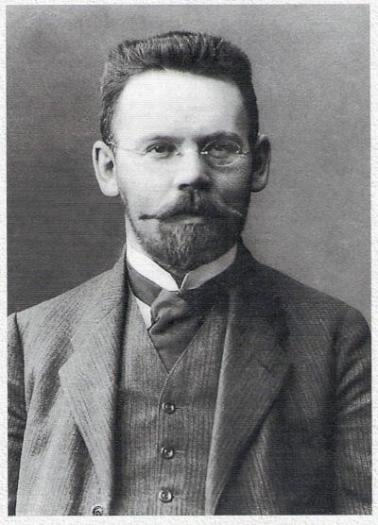

Member of the Revolutionary Assembly
- In office 1918–1920

Deputy of the Czechoslovak National Assembly
- In office 1925–1935

Minister for the unification of laws and organisation of information
- In office 1929–1929

Senator of the Senate of Czechoslovakia
- In office 1935–1939

Professor of Applied Sociology, Comenius University
- In office 1937–1945

Rector of Comenius University
- In office 1945–1949

Personal details
- Born: 15 April 1877 Veľké Leváre, Kingdom of Hungary
- Died: 29 April 1964 (aged 87) Žiar nad Hronom, Czechoslovakia

Anton Štefánek (15 April 1877 – 29 April 1964) was a Slovak politician and sociologist who was involved in the campaign for Czech and Slovak unity and independence from the Austro-Hungarian Empire. He was an important promoter of the concept of Czechoslovakism and served for 14 years in the Czechoslovak National Assembly and the Senate of Czechoslovakia in the 1920s and 1930s. He also pursued an academic career at Comenius University in Bratislava, culminating in his serving as rector of the university for several years after the Second World War. He was forced into retirement a year after the Czechoslovak coup d'état of 1948.

== Early life and political career ==
Štefánek was born in Veľké Leváre what was then the Kingdom of Hungary and is now in western Slovakia. Educated in Vienna, he began a career in political journalism with the publication Hlas (The Voice), edited by Vavro Šrobár. He later edited Slovenský týždenník and Slovenský denník with Milan Hodža. Initially a member of the Slovak National Party, he dedicated himself to agrarian issues and worked with Šrobár and Pavol Blaho to promote Czech and Slovak unity and raise the cultural and political awareness of Slovak peasants in their towns and villages.

He lived in Prague for most of the First World War and was involved with the Maffie, an underground operation of the Czechoslovak National Council in the Czech and Slovak lands. After the war he joined the Revolutionary National Assembly and worked to organise Slovak schools following the establishment of Czechoslovakia. He represented the Republican Party of Farmers and Peasants in the Czechoslovak National Assembly as a deputy between 1925 and 1935 and subsequently as a senator from 1935 to 1939. He became a member of the Republican Executive Committee in 1925 and served in 1929 as the Czechoslovak minister of education and culture and also as minister for the unification of laws.

== Academic career ==
In 1937 Štefánek became professor of applied sociology at the Philosophical Faculty of Comenius University in Bratislava. In his academic career Štefánek was a follower of Tomáš Garrigue Masaryk, the sociologist and philosopher who went on to be the founder and first President of Czechoslovakia. Štefánek promoted Czechoslovakism and specialised in identifying the differences between the Czech and Slovak peoples. He participated in the anti-fascist resistance during the Second World War, in which Šrobár was also involved, before becoming rector of the university in 1945. He was forced for political reasons to retire in 1949, a year after the Communist Party seized power. He died in relative obscurity in 1964 in Žiar nad Hronom, "unjustly forgotten" as Eduard Nižňanský puts it. He was posthumously awarded the Order of Tomáš Garrigue Masaryk in 1992 by post-Communist Czechoslovakia.
