= František Šedivý =

Czech resistance fighter (1927–2021)

- Born: 2 July 1927; Zadní Třebaň, First Czechoslovak Republic
- Died: 23 February 2021 (aged 93)
- Occupations: Resistance fighter Writer

František Šedivý (2 July 1927 – 23 February 2021) was a Czech resistance fighter, political prisoner, and writer. He served as Vice-President of the Confederation of Political Prisoners of the Czech Republic.

== Biography ==
Šedivý was expelled from secondary school during the German occupation of Czechoslovakia in World War II and began working in a Junkers factory in 1944. He was an active participant in the resistance against the Nazis at that time. After the 1948 Czechoslovak coup d'état, which led to the installation of the Czechoslovak Socialist Republic, he helped smuggle refugees across the border in the Bohemian Forest into Bavaria. In the early 1950s, he was arrested for revealing the identity of a secret agent and sentenced to 14 years in prison, which he largely spent in uranium mines in Jáchymov. He was paroled in February 1964.

In 1989, Šedivý became involved in the Konfederace politických vězňů České republiky (Confederation of Political Prisoners of the Czech Republic) and served as its first Vice-President. He also chaired the Klub dr. Milady Horákové, and became a member of PEN International.

On 28 October 2009, he was inducted into the Order of Tomáš Garrigue Masaryk by President Václav Klaus for outstanding achievements and contributions to democracy and human rights. On 31 May 2008, he was given honorary citizenship to his hometown, Zadní Třebaň. He received the same honor from Řevnice on 7 May 2010.

František Šedivý died on 23 February 2021 at the age of 93.
