= Vavrišovo =

- Municipality
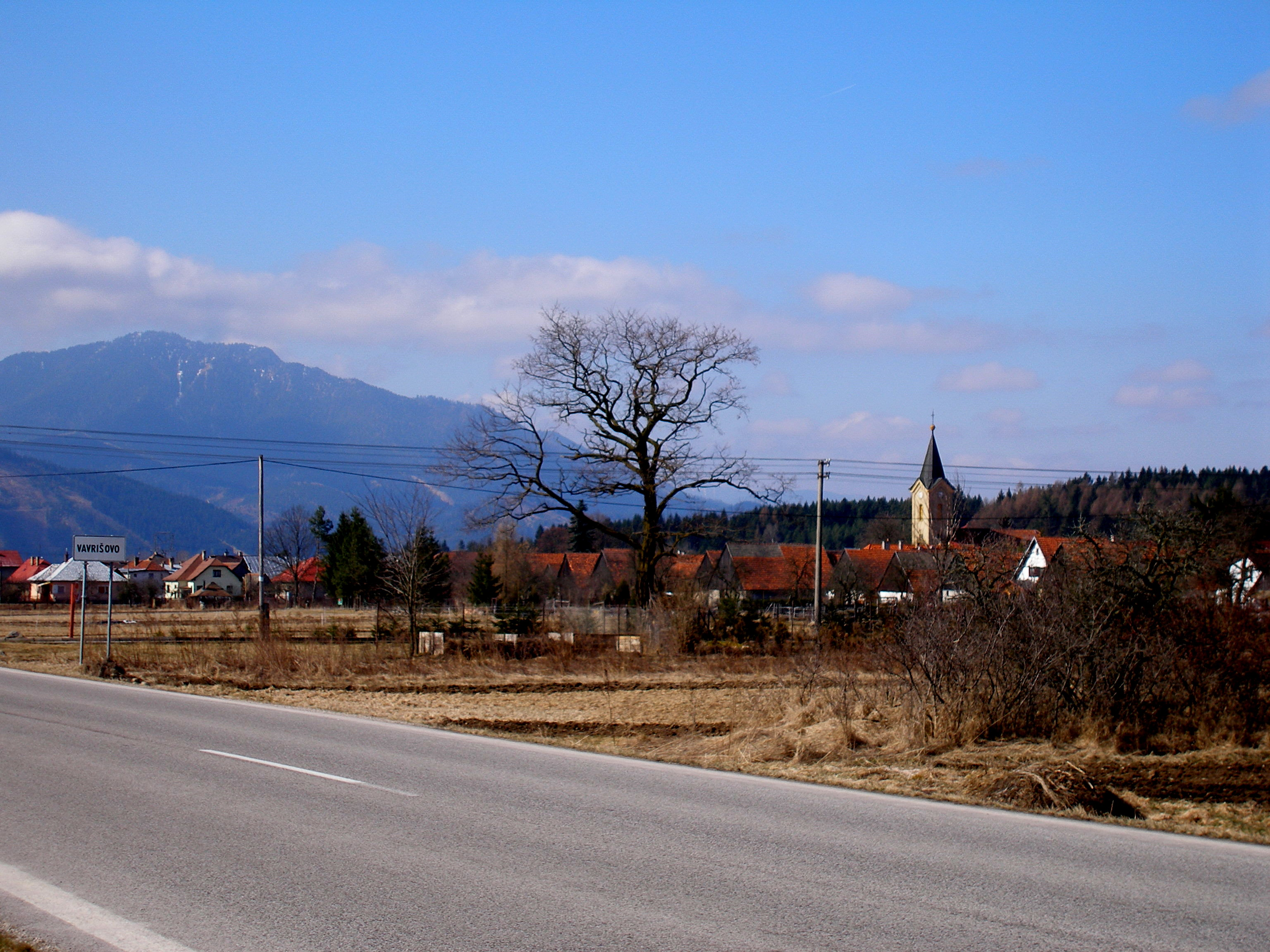

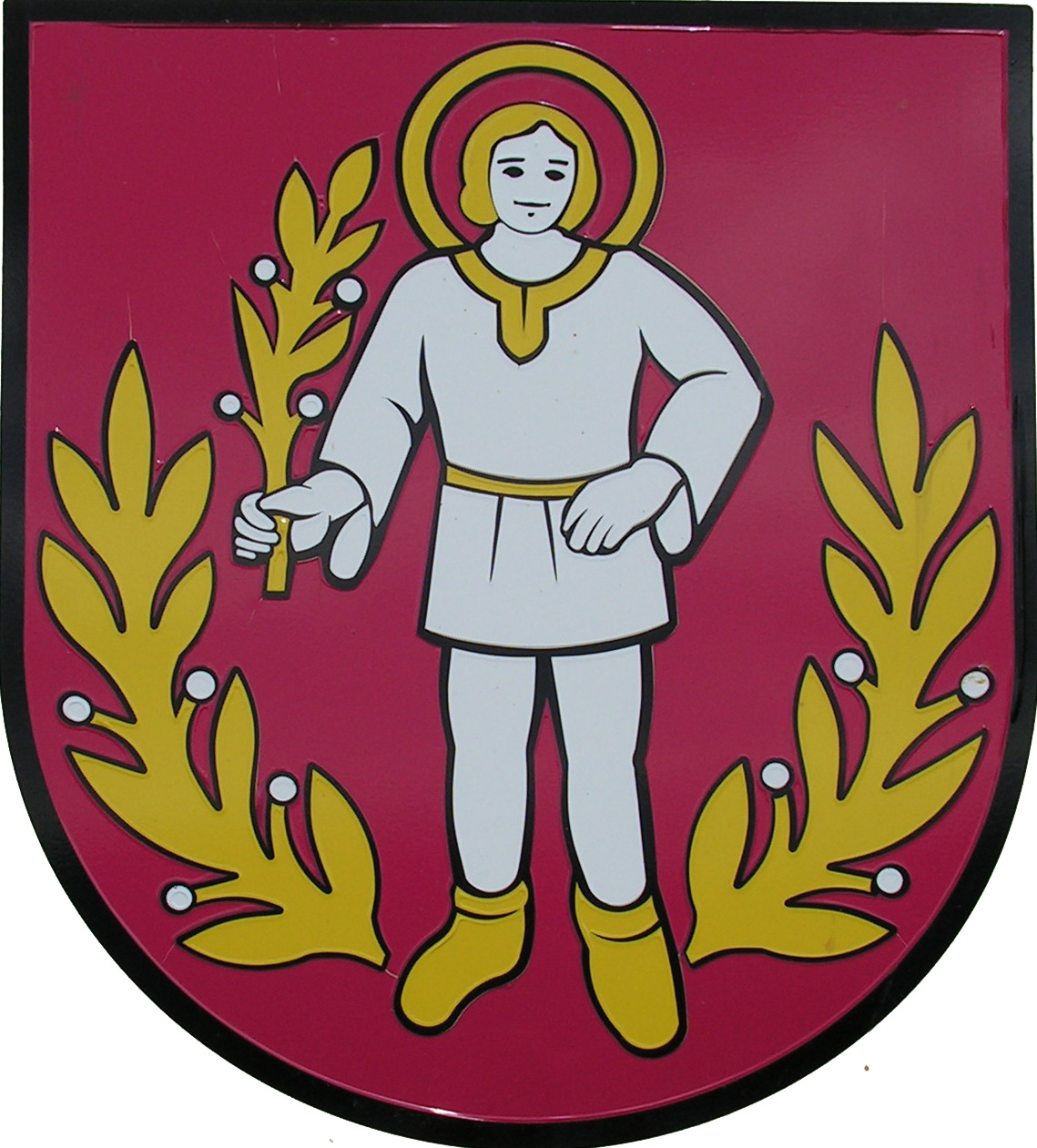
- Flag Coat of arms

- Location of Vavrišovo in the Žilina Region Location of Vavrišovo in Slovakia
- Coordinates: 49.07°N 19.77°E
- Country: Slovakia
- Region: Žilina Region
- District: Liptovský Mikuláš District
- First mentioned: 1286

Area
  - Total: 9.90 km^{2} (3.82 sq mi)
- Elevation: 699 m (2,293 ft)

Population (2025)
  - Total: 688
- Time zone: UTC+1 (CET)
  - Summer (DST): UTC+2 (CEST)
- Postal code: 324 1
- Area code: +421 44
- Vehicle registration plate (until 2022): LM
- Website: www.vavrisovo.sk

Vavrišovo (Hungarian: Vavrisó) is a village and municipality in the Liptovský Mikuláš District in the Žilina Region of northern Slovakia.

== History ==
The village was first mentioned in historical records in the year 1231.

During the late 17th century resistance developed among the nobility and serfs against the Habsburg government, especially after the Bratislava Diet in 1687, which passed measures that limited professional interests and privileges of the nobility. General hatred resulted in Rákóczi's War of Independence, an uprising led by Francis II Rákóczi.

In 1704, Rákoczi's rebel band (Kuruc) entered Slovakia. The village of Vavrišovo Kokava was burned during the ensuing war. In 1708, the Kuruc army suffered defeat at the Battle of Trencin, and this was a turning point in the war. The locality was involved in the Liptov campaign of August 1709. One of the last battles of the rebellion took place around the village of Vavrišovo.

Before the establishment of independent Czechoslovakia in 1918, Vavrišovo was part of Liptó County within the Kingdom of Hungary. From 1939 to 1945, it was part of the Slovak Republic.

== Richtari (Vogts) of Vavrisovo 1784-1931 ==
- 1784 Mišo Hrkot
- 1785 Mišo Chlebo
- 1787 Ďuro Karas
- 1801 Jano Paštrnák
- 1787 Ďuro Tomčík
- 1805 Ján Vongrej
- 1813 Jano Paštrnák
- 1816 Jánoš de Benyó
- 1819 Ján Kazár
- 1819 Ondrej Grešo
- 1822 Ján Kazár
- 1826 Matej Janotka
- 1826-1830 Mišo Peteraj
- 1829 Mišo Murtin
- 1830 Mišo Marek
- 1831 Mišo Mojžiš
- 1837 Adam Šramo
- 1841 Martin Slabej
- 1845 Matej Plávka
- 1854 Matej Vongrej
- 1855 Jozef Mikuláš
- 1859 Ondrej Plávka
- 1861-1863 Matej Plávka
- 1864 Michal Slabej
- 1866-1867 Michal Orech
- 1870 Matej Vongrej
- 1871 Marek
- 1872 Pavel Števček
- 1872 Michal Mojžiš
- 1876-1878 Pavel Mojžiš
- 1880-1882 Matej Šramo
- 1882-1884 Ondrej Janotka
- 1885-1886 Ján Kováč
- 1889-1890 Adam Peteraj
- 1890 Ondrej Peteraj
- 1891-1899 Ján Králik
- 1900-1904 Peter Krivoš
- 1904-1909 Ján Králik
- 1909-1913 Ján Majerík
- 1913-1921 Peter Kochol
- 1921 Ján Ondrej Beňo
- 1925 Ján Mojžiš
- 1929 Peter Kochol
- 1932 Matej Stupka
- 1938 Peter Šimovček
- 1939 Michal Sochor - Komisár

== Mayors of Vavrisovo 1944- ==
- 1944 František Iľanovský
- 1944 Peter Šimovček
- 1945 Ján Dzuriak
- 1946 Ján Janotka
- 1948 Jozef Jurík
- 1950 Michal Jančuška
- 1953 Jaroslav Krajčí
- 1957 Michal Vongrej
- 1960 Ján Karas
- 1964 Matej Trepáč
- 1971 Ján Janotka - 1971-1990
- 1990 Vladimír Grešo
- 1991 Ján Janotka
- 2010 Ľubomír Račko
- 2015 Ľubica Chlebová

== Geography ==
The municipality lies at an altitude of 699 metres (2,293 ft) and covers an area of 9.90 km^{2} (3.82 sq mi) (2025).

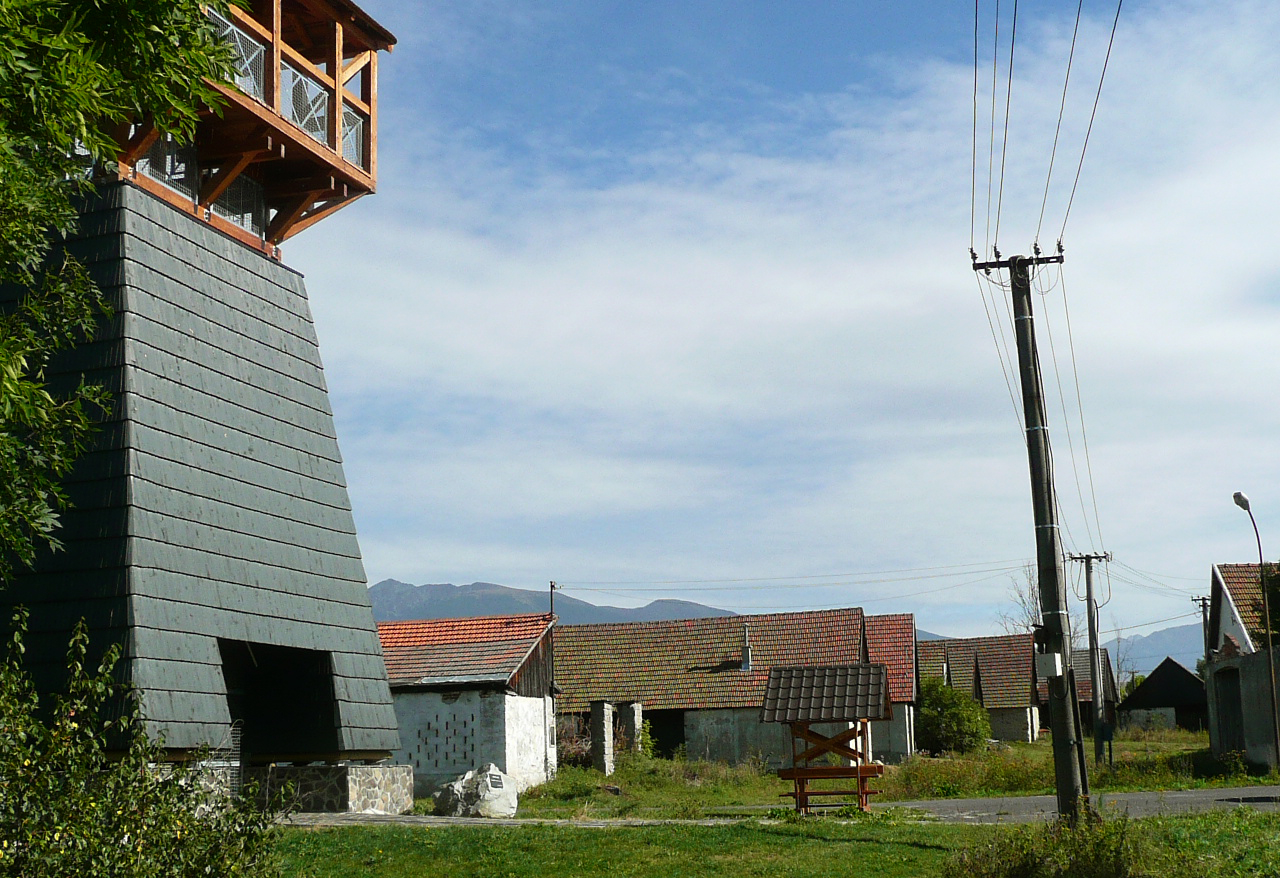
The recently opened museum

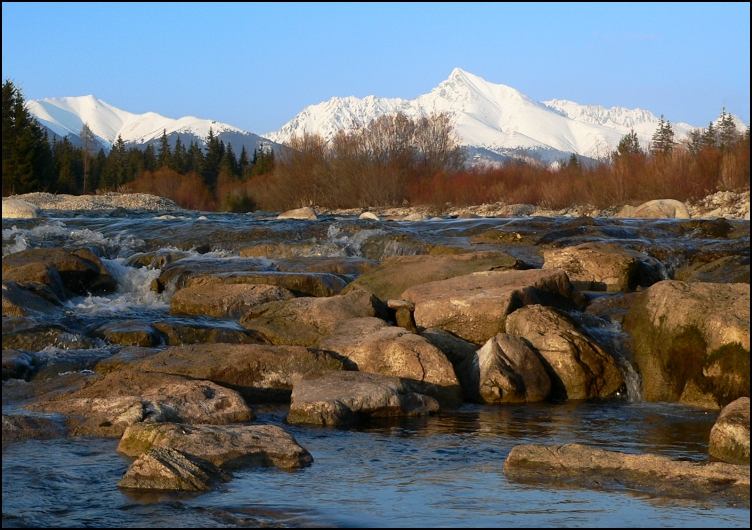
View of Kriváň from the Belá river outside Vavrišovo

== Population ==
Population statistic (10 years)
Year	1995	2005	2015	2025
Count	515	616	674	688
Difference		+19.61%	+9.41%	+2.07%

Population statistic
Year	2024	2025
Count	689	688
Difference		−0.14%

It has a population of 688 people (31 December 2025).

=== Ethnicity ===
Census 2021 (1+ %)
Ethnicity	Number	Fraction
Slovak	652	97.16%
Not found out	11	1.63%
Czech	8	1.19%
Romani	8	1.19%
Total	671	

In year 2021 was 671 people by ethnicity 652 as Slovak, 11 as Not found out, 8 as Czech, 8 as Romani, 2 as Austrian, 2 as German, 2 as English, 1 as Ukrainian, 1 as Rusyn, 1 as Hungarian and 1 as Other.

Note on population: The difference values of population numbers in the table "Population statistic" and in the sections "Ethnicity" & "Religion" is caused by the use of various statistical methods.

=== Religion ===
Census 2021 (1+ %)
Religion	Number	Fraction
Evangelical Church	289	43.07%
None	188	28.02%
Roman Catholic Church	133	19.82%
Baptists Church	17	2.53%
Greek Catholic Church	12	1.79%
Not found out	10	1.49%
Ad hoc movements	10	1.49%
Total	671	

In year 2021 was 671 people by religion 289 from Evangelical Church, 188 from None, 133 from Roman Catholic Church, 17 from Baptists Church, 12 from Greek Catholic Church, 10 from Not found out, 10 from Ad hoc movements, 4 from Eastern Orthodox Church, 2 from Other and not ascertained christian church, 2 from Other, 1 from Old Catholic Church, 1 from Paganism and natural spirituality, 1 from Jehovah's Witnesses and 1 from Christian Congregations in Slovakia.

== Notable people ==
- Peter Zaťko (economist) (1903–1978), economist
