= Božena Komárková =

Czech philosopher and theologian (1903-1997)

Božena Komárková (28 January 1903, Tišnov – 27 January 1997, Brno) was a Czech philosopher and theologian.

Most of her work remained unknown both in the Czech Republic and abroad till the Velvet Revolution, since Nazi and communist regimes persecuted her and tried to isolate her from society.

In 2003 a selection of Komárková's essays was published in English under the title Human Rights and the Rise of the Secular Age.
