= Vavro Šrobár =

Slovak politician and doctor

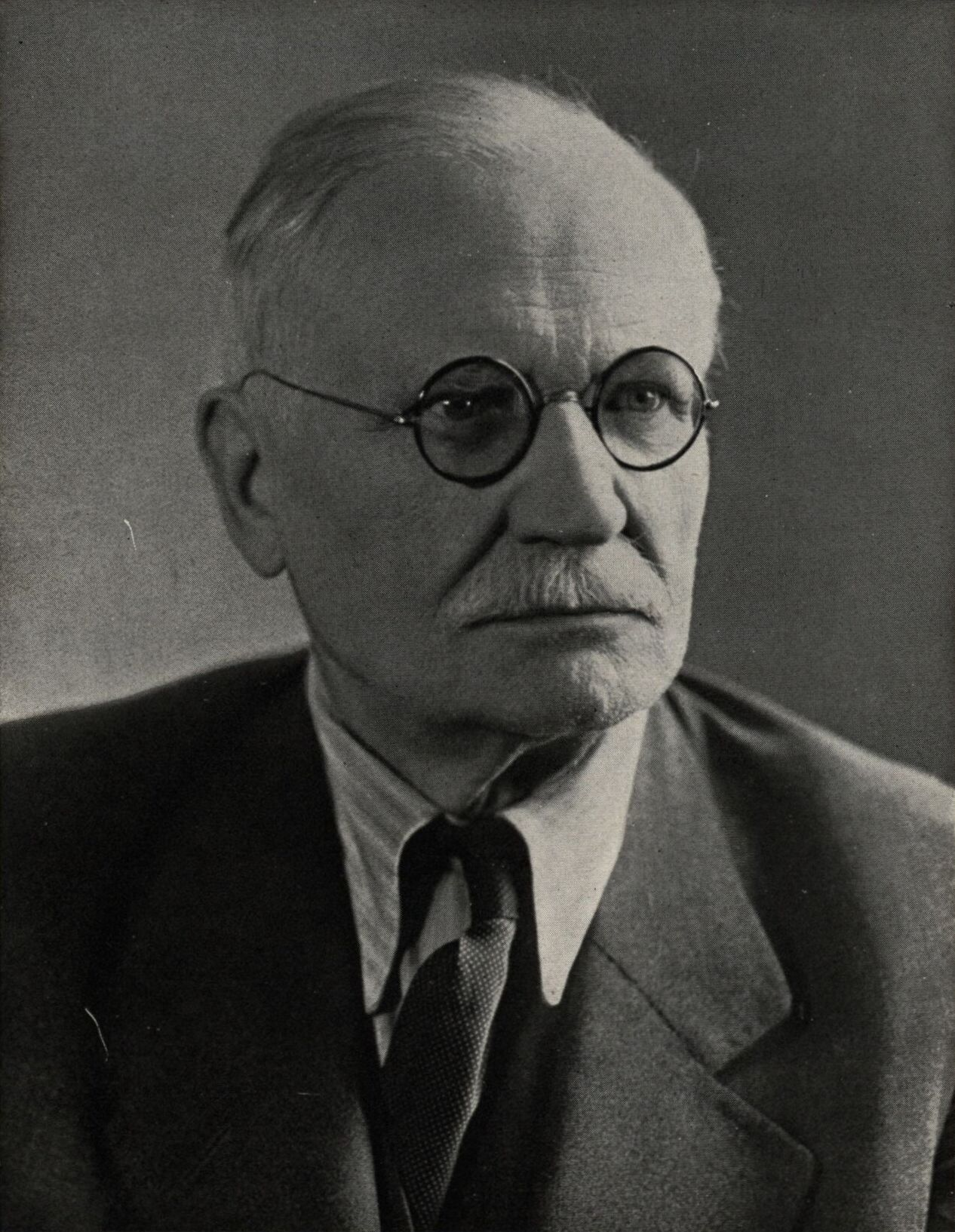
- Vavro Šrobár, 1948

Minister of Health and Sports
- In office 14 November 1918 – 15 September 1920
- President: Tomáš Garrigue Masaryk
- Prime Minister: Karel Kramář; Vlastimil Tusar
- Preceded by: Office established
- Succeeded by: Ladislav Prokop Procházka

Minister for the Administration of Slovakia
- In office 14 November 1918 – 25 May 1920
- President: Tomáš Garrigue Masaryk
- Prime Minister: Karel Kramář; Vlastimil Tusar
- Preceded by: Office established
- Succeeded by: Ivan Dérer

Minister of Unification
- In office 25 May 1920 – 15 September 1920
- President: Tomáš Garrigue Masaryk
- Prime Minister: Vlastimil Tusar
- Preceded by: Milan Hodža
- Succeeded by: Vladimír Fajnor
- In office 25 February 1948 – 6 December 1950
- President: Edvard Beneš; Klement Gottwald
- Prime Minister: Klement Gottwald; Antonín Zápotocký
- Preceded by: Mikuláš Franek
- Succeeded by: Office abolished

Minister of Education and National Enlightenment
- In office 26 September 1921 – 7 October 1922
- President: Tomáš Garrigue Masaryk
- Prime Minister: Jan Černý; Edvard Beneš
- Preceded by: Josef Šusta
- Succeeded by: Rudolf Bechyně

Minister of Finance
- In office 5 April 1945 – 2 July 1946
- President: Edvard Beneš
- Prime Minister: Zdeněk Fierlinger
- Preceded by: Josef Kalfus
- Succeeded by: Jaromír Dolanský

Personal details
- Born: Vavrinec Ján Šrobár; 9 August 1867 Lisková, Kingdom of Hungary, Austria-Hungary
- Died: 6 December 1950 (aged 83) Olomouc, Czechoslovakia
- Party: Slovak National and Peasant Party; Republican Party; Democratic Party; Freedom Party
- Education: Charles University

Vavrinec Ján Šrobár, known as Vavro Šrobár (9 August 1867 – 6 December 1950) was a Slovak medical doctor and politician. He was a major figure in Slovak politics in the interwar period.

Šrobár played an important role in the creation of Czechoslovakia in 1918 following the collapse of the Austro-Hungarian Empire and served in a variety of ministerial roles between the wars. He also served for many years as a representative in the Czechoslovak parliament and was a tenured professor in the history of medicine. Šrobár retired from public life before the outbreak of the Second World War, but following the war he resumed a ministerial career in the re-established Czechoslovak government in the five years before his death.

== Early life and education ==
Born in Lisková (then part of the Kingdom of Hungary), he was educated between 1878 and 1882 at the gymnasium in Ružomberok where only the Hungarian language – which he did not speak – was used as the language of education. He moved to the German-speaking gymnasium at Levoča between 1882 and 1883 before moving on, between 1883 and 1886, to the gymnasia at Banská Bystrica and Přerov in Moravia, from which he ultimately graduated. As he was a Slovak he was not permitted to graduate from gymnasia in Upper Hungary (corresponding mostly to present-day Slovakia). From 1888 to 1898 Šrobár studied medicine at Charles University in Prague, where he chaired the student organisation Detvan.

== Political emergence ==
After graduating he returned to Ružomberok and became the founder and chief editor of the journal Hlas ("The Voice"), published by and in support of progressive young Slovak intellectuals who opposed the Slovak National Party's conservative approach to politics. He was a supporter and acquaintance of Tomáš Garrigue Masaryk, the sociologist and philosopher who went on to be the founder and first President of Czechoslovakia. After unsuccessfully running for a seat in the Diet of Hungary, his agitation on behalf of Slovak causes led to him being imprisoned for a year in 1906 along with Andrej Hlinka, on the grounds of "instigation against the Magyar nationality". He had continued to work as a doctor and in 1909 he published Ľudová obrázková zdravoveda ("Illustrated Guide to Public Health").

Slovak aspirations towards independence continued to simmer during the First World War, accompanied by the rise of an agrarian movement with which Šrobár was involved. Along with Anton Štefánek and Pavol Blaho, he visited Slovak villages to promote the course of Czech and Slovak unity and to provide both a political and a cultural education to the peasants. He also involved himself with the Czechoslovak National Council (CNR), an émigré organisation led by Edvard Beneš that campaigned abroad for an independent Czechoslovak state. He acted as a representative for the Maffie, the CNR's underground operation in the Czech lands and Slovakia. By the end of the war the Austro-Hungarian Empire was beginning to disintegrate and on 1 May 1918 Šrobár proclaimed the Slovak people's right to self-determination and to create a common state with the Czechs. He was arrested by the Hungarian authorities and imprisoned until October 1918 when the empire collapsed.

== Career in inter-war Czechoslovakia ==
Šrobár was appointed the Slovak chairman of the CNR and signed the new Czechoslovak state's proclamation of independence, which was read out in Prague on 28 October. He was the only Slovak involved. He was not by any means a major political figure in Slovakia at the time and his involvement only a few days after his release from prison was quite fortuitous, as he later recalled:

Around 24 October an unclear and vague unrest caught hold of me. [...] On Monday 28 October I got off the train [...] I made my way to the editorial office of the Nat. Listy, where I met Štefánek. [...] 'We have been waiting for you for three days.' [...] In front of the Obecny dom [town hall] there was a huge crowd. [...] Through the whole night and the following days we put down the [institutional] requirements of the state.

The CNR had not, in fact, given any thought to issuing an official invitation to the Slovaks (whose own Slovak National Council would issue its own declaration of independence two days later, unaware of the CNR's actions) but as Šrobár was well known to Masaryk and the other Czech leaders he was accepted as a representative of Slovakia. The oversight was indicative of the Czech leaders' drive to create a Czech-led Czechoslovakia, with the Slovaks relegated to a subordinate role.

Over the following two months Šrobár founded the provisional government of Slovakia and became both the Czechoslovak minister of health and the minister for the administration of Slovakia. He retained both posts until 1920 and contributed significantly to the establishment of Czechoslovak rule in Slovakia, exercising virtually dictatorial powers on behalf of the Prague government. It was Šrobár's decision to make the former Austrian city of Pressburg – now Bratislava – the administrative capital of Slovakia, despite only 15% of its pre-war population being Slovaks. He also chose who would represent Slovakia on the newly established Revolutionary National Assembly. Only 54 of its 256 members were from Slovakia, and of those only 41 were ethnic Slovaks. Lutherans outnumbered Catholics – the majority denomination in Slovakia – by three to one, reflecting Šrobár's pro-Lutheran leanings but angering the Slovak Catholic clergy and increasing ethnic and religious tensions in the new state. He dissolved the Slovak National Council on 8 January 1919 as part of a centralising drive, for which he was widely criticised, and a year later Slovakia itself was abolished as an administrative unit under the new constitution.

Šrobár served as a member of the Czechoslovak parliament between 1918 and 1925, representing the Slovak National Republican and Peasant Party initially and subsequently the Republican Party of Farmers and Peasants after a merger with another party in the early 1920s. Šrobár's ministerial career continued between 1920 and 1923 with appointments as the minister for public health and physical education, minister for the unification of laws and organisation of information, and minister of education and national enlightenment.

In 1923 Šrobár submitted his post-doctoral thesis in social medicine at Bratislava's Comenius University. He was elected to the Czechoslovak Senate in 1925 and acted the chair of the Agrarian Club in the Senate between 1925 and 1929. He published a two-volume work, Oslobodené Slovensko (Liberated Slovakia), between 1928 and 1932, and in 1935 he was appointed by Comenius University as a tenured professor for the history of medicine. Two years later, in 1937, he retired from academic and political life.

== Second World War and post-war career ==
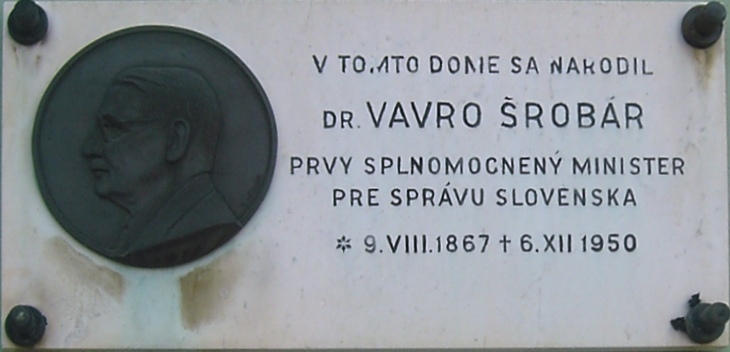
Memorial plaque on Šrobár's house

During the Second World War, when Slovakia was a nominally independent pro-Nazi puppet state, Šrobár was discreetly active as a supporter of the anti-fascist Czechoslovak opposition. He became co-chairman of the revived Slovak National Council in 1944, representing the non-Communist elements of the anti-fascist movement, and wrote the text of a statement read by Jozef Styk on 30 August 1944 that launched the Slovak National Uprising against the pro-Nazi government.

After the war he was appointed minister of finance in the restored Czechoslovakia and served in this role until 1947. Šrobár also founded the Catholic Freedom Party in 1946, which later merged into the Czechoslovak National Front, and published an autobiography, Z môjho života (From My Life) in the same year. He subsequently served as minister for the unification of laws. He continued in this role in the Communist government of Klement Gottwald that came to power in the Czechoslovak coup d'etat of 1948. On 6 December 1950, Šrobár died in Olomouc in Moravia and was initially buried there. His body was later reinterred in St Martin's Cemetery in Bratislava.
