= Tišnov =

- Town
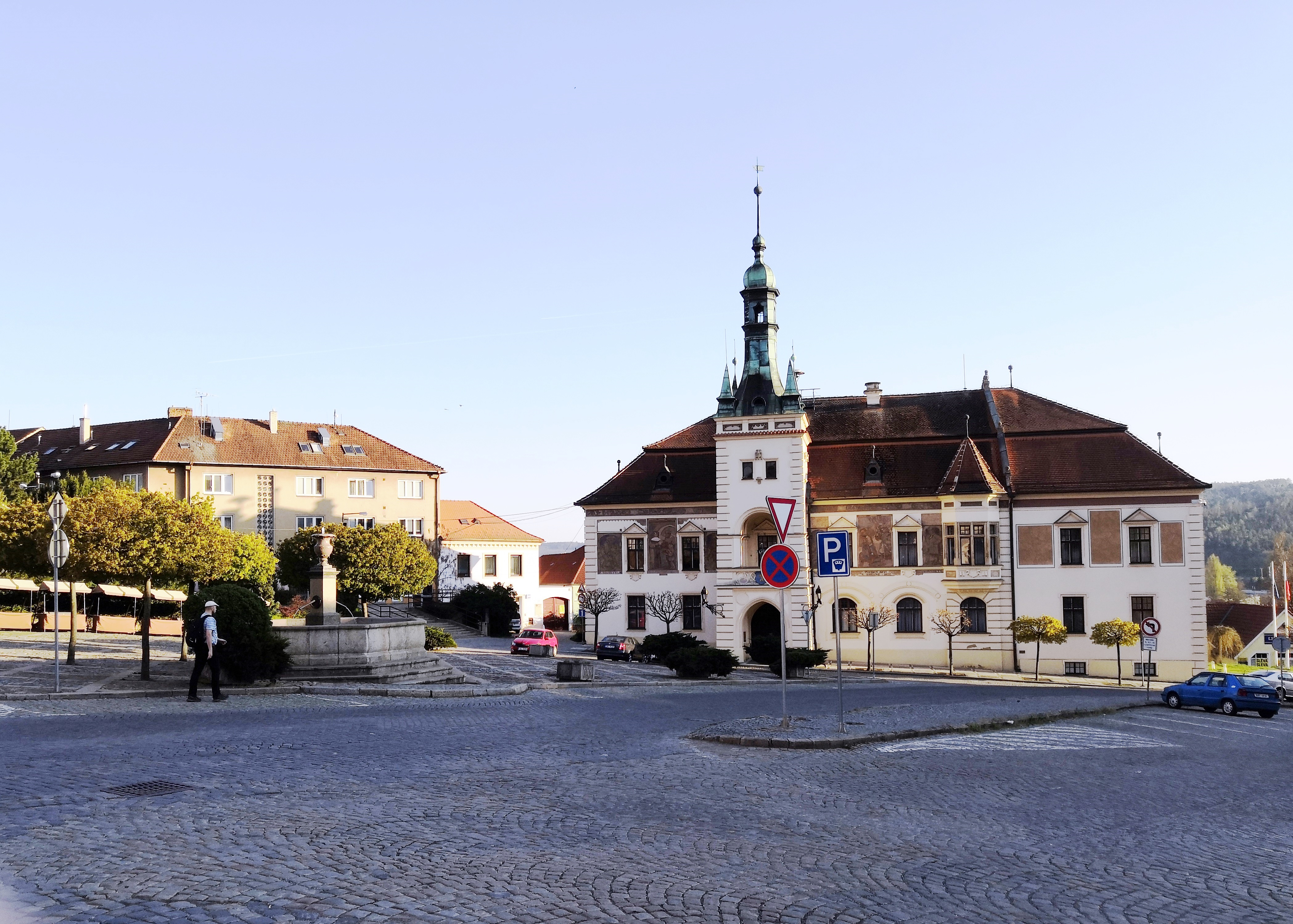
- The square Náměstí Míru with the town hall

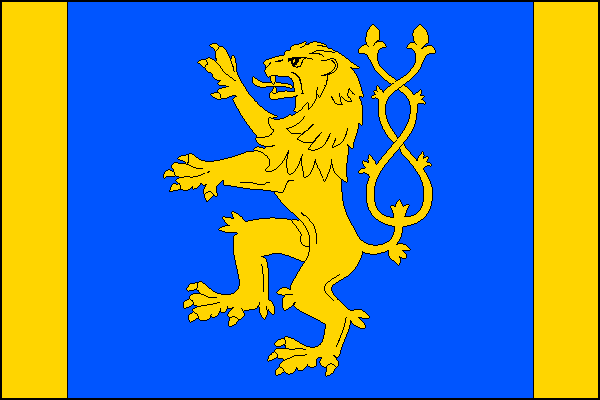
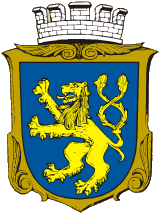
- Flag Coat of arms

- Location in the Czech Republic
- Coordinates: 49°20′55″N 16°25′28″E
- Country: Czech Republic
- Region: South Moravian
- District: Brno-Country
- First mentioned: 1233

Government
  - Mayor: Jiří Dospíšil

Area
  - Total: 17.12 km^{2} (6.61 sq mi)
- Elevation: 256 m (840 ft)

Population (2026-01-01)
  - Total: 9,270
  - Density: 541/km^{2} (1,400/sq mi)
- Time zone: UTC+1 (CET)
  - Summer (DST): UTC+2 (CEST)
- Postal codes: 666 01, 666 03
- Website: www.tisnov.cz

Tišnov (Czech pronunciation: [ˈcɪʃnof]; German: Tischnowitz) is a town in Brno-Country District in the South Moravian Region of the Czech Republic. It has about 9,300 inhabitants. The town proper is located on the Svratka River in the Boskovice Furrow.

Tišnov was founded in the 13th century at the latest and officially became a town in 1788. The main landmarks of the town are the town hall from 1905 and the Church of Saint Wenceslaus from the 15th century.

== Administrative division ==
Tišnov consists of five municipal parts (in brackets population according to the 2021 census):

- Tišnov (8,973)
- Hajánky (68)
- Hájek (48)
- Jamné (93)
- Pejškov (63)

Pejškov and the area of Hajánky, Hájek and Jamné form two exclaves of the municipal territory.

== Geography ==
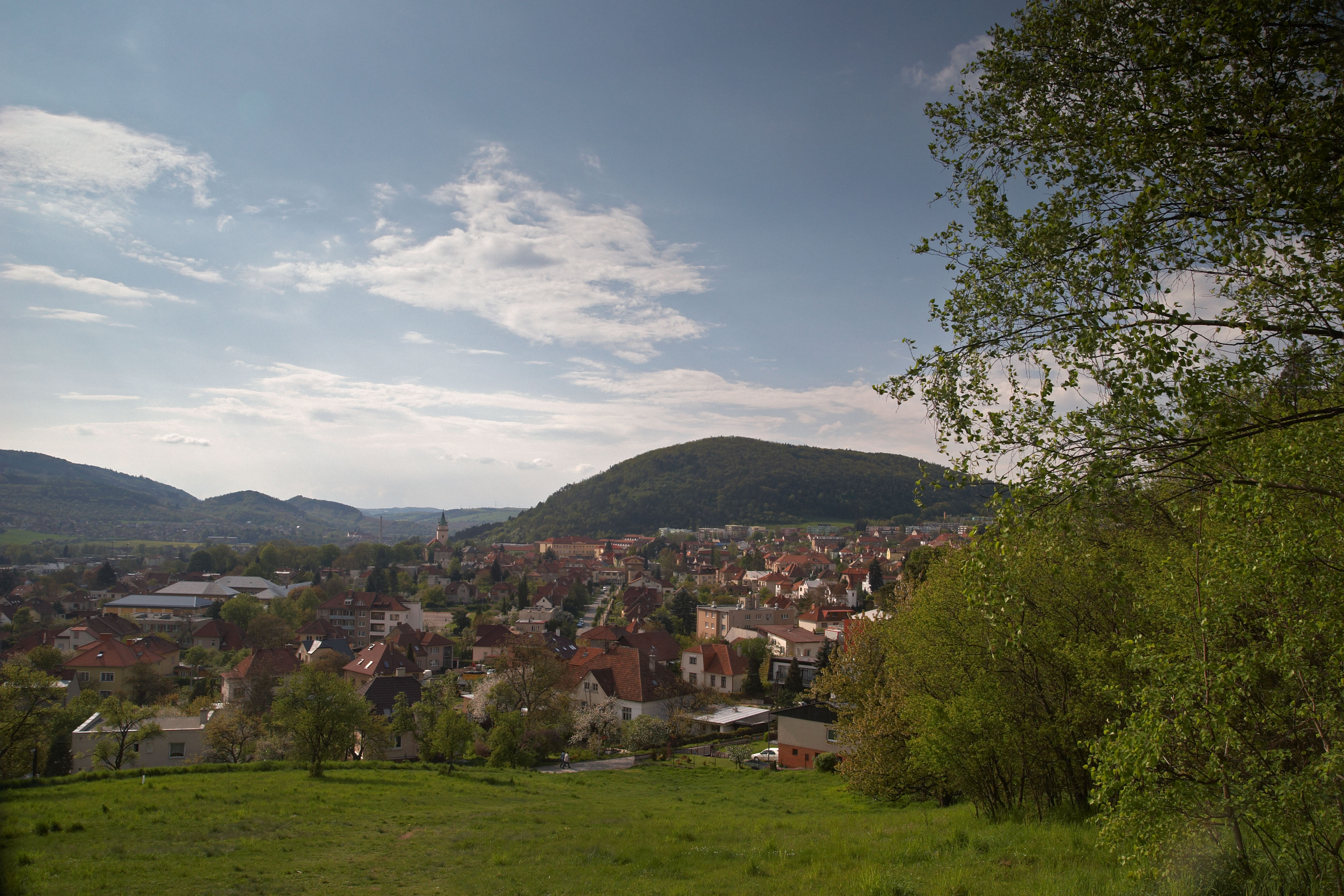
General view

Tišnov is located about 19 kilometres (12 mi) northwest of Brno. Most of the municipal territory lies in the Boskovice Furrow, but the northeastern exclave lies in the Upper Svratka Highlands and the southwestern exclave in the Křižanov Highlands. The highest point is a contour line at 497 m (1,631 ft) above sea level, located in the northeastern exclave. The town proper is situated on the left bank of the Svratka River.

== History ==
The first written mention of Tišnov is from 1233, in a charter of the Porta coeli Convent in neighbouring Předklášteří. Tišnov was originally a market village located on an important trade route. It was owned by the Cistercian convert until its dissolution in 1782. Already in the 13th century, Tišnov developed into a small town.

In 1416, King Wenceslaus IV granted Tišnov the right to hold an annual market. It was burned down during the Hussite Wars in 1428 and damaged by the Thirty Years' War. It was also damaged by fires several times, the largest fire occurred in 1668. In 1788, Tišnov was promoted to a town. The town was affected by the passage of Napoleonic troops in 1805 and 1809, and by the Austro-Prussian War in 1866.

A railway line connecting Tišnov to Brno was constructed in 1885, and in 1905 the track was extended to Havlíčkův Brod. Until 1918, Tišnov was a part of Austria-Hungary. From 1918 to the 1930s, the town experienced economic and construction growth. The town's debt has slowed down further development, which did not occur again until after World War II.

== Demographics ==
Historical population

Year	Pop.	±%
1869	3,109	—
1880	3,182	+2.3%
1890	3,379	+6.2%
1900	3,567	+5.6%
1910	3,918	+9.8%

Year	Pop.	±%
1921	4,021	+2.6%
1930	4,791	+19.1%
1950	5,223	+9.0%
1961	5,741	+9.9%
1970	6,939	+20.9%

Year	Pop.	±%
1980	9,090	+31.0%
1991	8,563	−5.8%
2001	8,304	−3.0%
2011	8,780	+5.7%
2021	9,245	+5.3%

Source: Censuses

== Economy ==
Tišnov has about 1,200 economically active entities. Services accounted for about 67% of these entities, industry and construction for about 26%, and agriculture, forestry and fishing for about 4%.

The local labour market is linked to Brno. According to the 2021 census, 2,452 residents commuted for work out of Tišnov (1,274 of them to Brno) and 2,155 people worked in the town.

The largest employers based in Tišnov are ČSAD Tišnov (bus and freight carrier) and the town of Tišnov, both with more than 250 employees. The largest industrial employer is Steinhauser, a processor of meat with more than 100 employees. Other manufacturers in the town include Mouka Tišnov, a manufacturer of straps and webbings.

== Transport ==
Tišnov is located on the railway lines Židlochovice–Křižanov via Brno, Tišnov–Hustopeče via Brno and Tišnov–Žďár nad Sázavou.

== Sights ==
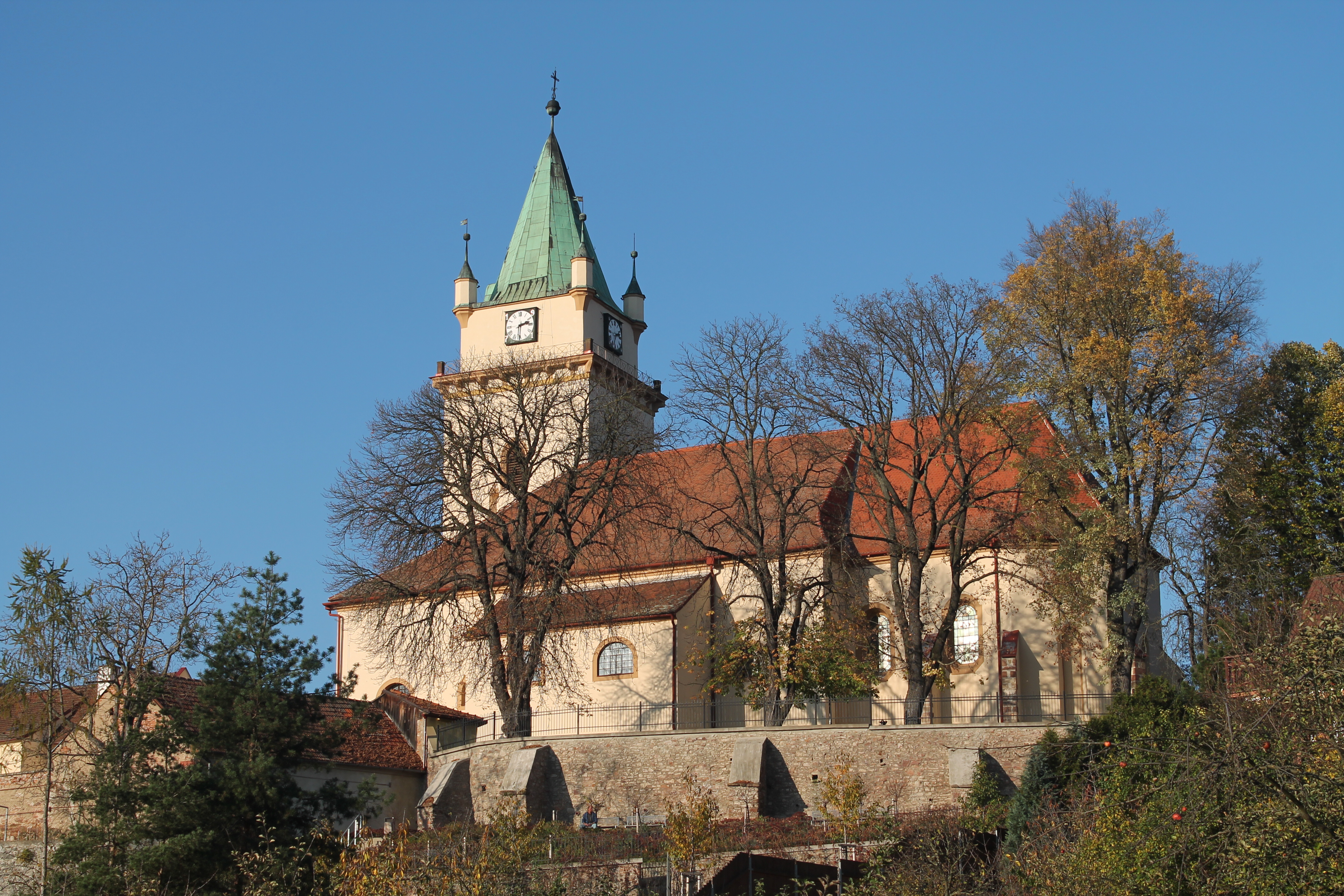
Church of Saint Wenceslaus

Among the main landmarks of Tišnov is the town hall. It was built in 1905 and designed by the architect Vladimír Fischer, replacing the original town hall from the 16th century. It is decorated by sgraffiti showing scenes from the history of the town.

The Church of Saint Wenceslaus was first mentioned in 1239. The wooden structure was replaced by a stone one in the 15th century. The church tower used to be a separate watchtower. The current form of the church is from the mid-19th century, when it was extended and connected to the tower.

== Notable people ==
- Božena Komárková (1903–1997), philosopher and theologian
- Jan Richter (1923–1999), ice hockey player
- František Sokol (1939–2011), volleyball player
- Karel Řehka (born 1975), military leader

== Twin towns – sister cities ==
Tišnov is twinned with:

- Moldava nad Bodvou, Slovakia
- Sereď, Slovakia
- Sulejów, Poland
