= Peter Zaťko (economist) =

Slovak economist and politician (1903–1978)

- Born: 17 October 1903; Vavrišovo, Kingdom of Hungary, Austria-Hungary
- Died: 10 February 1978 (aged 74); Bratislava, Czechoslovakia

Academic background
- Education: Prague Business School; Charles University

Academic work
- Notable ideas: Financed the Slovak National Uprising
- Awards: 1991 Order of Tomáš Garrigue Masaryk

Peter Zaťko (17 October 1903 – 10 February 1978) was a Slovak economist and politician.

== Biography ==
=== Early life and education ===
Zaťko was born on 17 October 1903 in the village of Vavrišovo to a Lutheran family. His father Matej was a master builder. He was educated an elementary school in the nearby towns Liptovský Hrádok and Liptovský Mikuláš. Afterwards, he studied at a business college in the city of Martin. In 1926 he graduated with a commerce engineer degree from the Prague Business School. In Prague, he also studied at the Charles University. After graduation he worked in the Czechoslovak-Hungarian Business Chamber in Prage, where he wrote several publications about Hungarian industrial policy and the reasons for failure to industrialize Slovakia.

=== Career ===
In the summer of 1929, Zaťko moved to Bratislava where he worked for the local Industrial Chamber. In Bratislava, he became acquainted with his fellow Slovak economist Imrich Karvaš, who became his close collaborator throughout most of his life. In 1936, Zaťko became the general secretary of the Union of Slovak Industry. He was briefly involved with Slovak politics, but refused to join the cabinet of Jozef Tiso, accepting only advisory position to the Minister of Economy Gejza Medrický. In spite of his reservations to the Slovak independence, he served as a Member of Parliament.

Zaťko closely cooperated with the resistance and together with Karvaš facilitated relocation of large amounts of money and supplies from Bratislava to Banská Bystrica, where they knew an uprising was about to start. Following the breakout of the Slovak National Uprising, Zaťko managed to evade the fate of Karvaš, who was arrested by gestapo and send to a concentration camp, by fleeing to the rebel controlled territory, where he became involved with logistical matters. In December 1944 he was sentenced, in absentia, to 20 years in jail for treason. Nonetheless, the fascist forces were unable to get hold of him as he fled to the territory already liberated by the advanced Soviet forces and joined the Czechoslovak government-in-exile.

=== Victim of communist persecution ===
After the end of the war, the restored Czechoslovakia put all representatives of the wartime Slovak state, including Zaťko and Karvaš, on trial for treason. Both economists were found innocent, due to their important role in the Slovak National Uprising, for which they were awarded the Order of the Slovak National Uprising just a few months before the trial. After his acquittal, Zaťko worked briefly as the director of Statistical and Planning Office. Nonetheless, the persecution of the economists restarted after the 1948 Czechoslovak coup d'état. In 1952 Zaťko was forcibly relocated from his apartment in Bratislava Tisovec, where his family was assigned two rooms, with kitchen and bathroom shared by other tenants, in a house previously owned by the family of the executed politician Vladimír Clementis. In Tisovec, Zaťko worked as a laborer in the local quarry. In May 1949 he was sentenced jointly with Karvaš to 3 years in jail. Nonetheless, he was pardoned after a few months but was never again allowed to hold a qualified occupation.

== Death ==
Zaťko died in obscurity on 10 January 1978 in Bratislava.
