= Brná =

Village and part of Ústí nad Labem in the Czech Republic

- Village
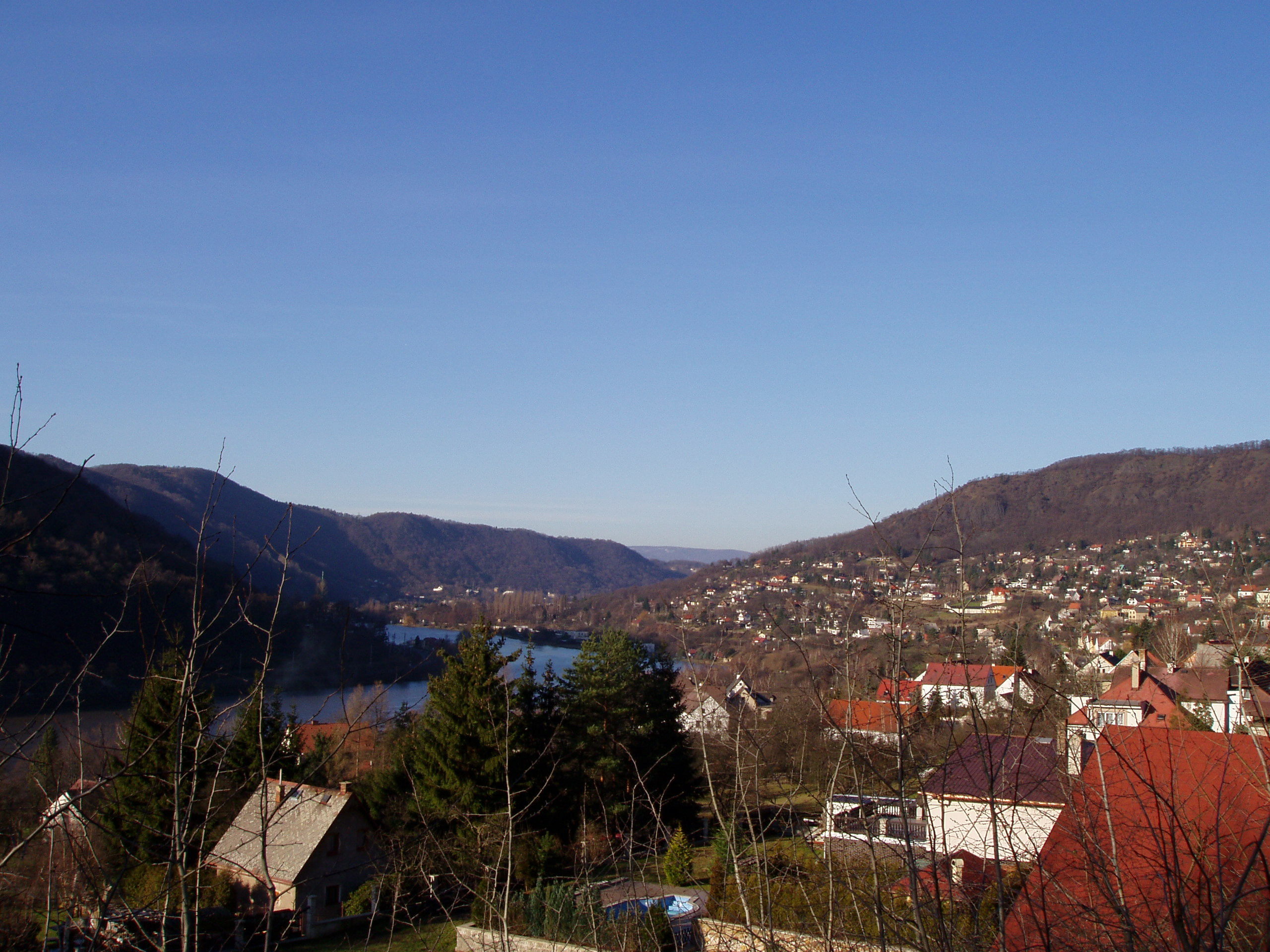
- View from the south

- Location in the Czech Republic
- Coordinates: 50°37′11″N 14°4′45″E
- Country: Czech Republic
- Region: Ústí nad Labem
- District: Ústí nad Labem
- Municipality: Ústí nad Labem
- First mentioned: 1057

Area
  - Total: 4.25 km^{2} (1.64 sq mi)
- Elevation: 168 m (551 ft)

Population (2021)
  - Total: 1,308
  - Density: 308/km^{2} (797/sq mi)
- Time zone: UTC+1 (CET)
  - Summer (DST): UTC+2 (CEST)
- Postal code: 403 21

Brná (German: Birnai) is a village and municipal part of Ústí nad Labem in Ústí nad Labem District in the Ústí nad Labem Region of the Czech Republic. It is located on the right bank of the Elbe River. Until 1980, it was a separate municipality.

== Etymology ==
The name is derived from the old Czech adjective brenná, meaning 'muddy (water)'.

== Geography ==
Brná is located in the southern part of the territory of Ústí nad Labem. It lies in the Central Bohemian Uplands and within the České středohoří Protected Landscape Area. The highest point is the hill Modřín at 630 m (2,070 ft) above sea level. The municipal part is situated on the right bank of the Elbe River.

In the north of the territory of Brná is the nature reserve called Sluneční stráň. It has an area of 9.9 ha (24 acres). The area is valued for its geological and geomorphological phenomena exposed by the erosion activity of the Elbe River, with ecosystems of low xerophilic shrubs, dry grasslands, and vegetation of rocks, including many rare species of plants.

== History ==
The first written mention of Brná is in the foundation deed of the Litoměřice Chapter from 1057. In 1194, it was acquired by the monastery in Teplá. In 1233, Brná was bought by the Teutonic Order. From the end of the 14th century, the village was a part of the Střekov estate, but later it became part of the Sebuzín estate. From the beginning of the 17th century until the establishment of a sovereign municipality in 1848, it belonged to the Lovosice estate. In 1980, Brná was merged with Ústí nad Labem.

== Demographics ==
Historical population

Year	Pop.	±%
1869	188	—
1880	174	−7.4%
1890	181	+4.0%
1900	199	+9.9%
1910	294	+47.7%

Year	Pop.	±%
1921	309	+5.1%
1930	464	+50.2%
1950	587	+26.5%
1961	588	+0.2%
1970	751	+27.7%

Year	Pop.	±%
1980	920	+22.5%
1991	903	−1.8%
2001	965	+6.9%
2011	1,179	+22.2%
2021	1,308	+10.9%

Source: Censuses

== Transport ==
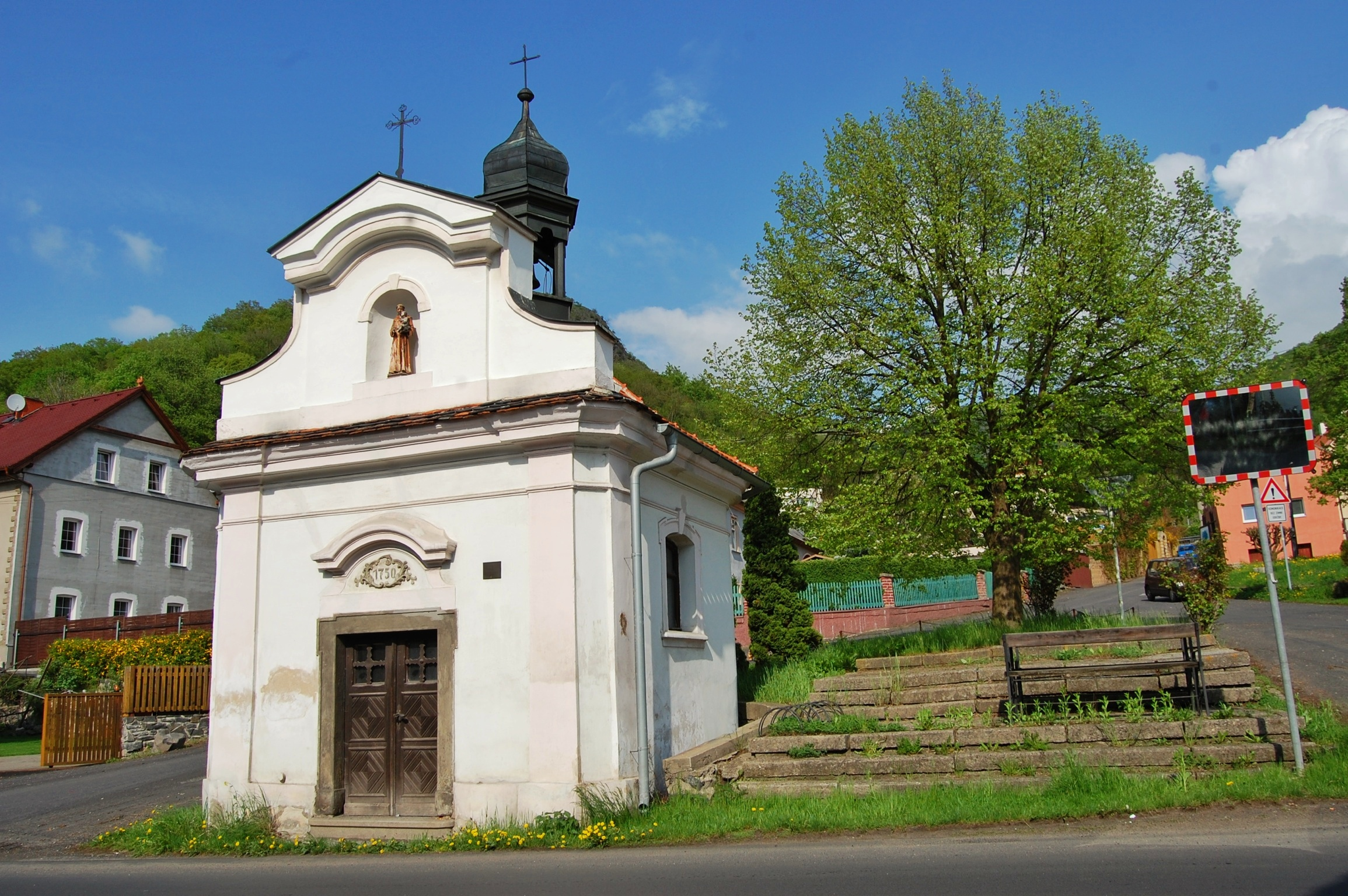
Chapel of Saint Anne

There is a dock for small vessels on the Elbe River.

The railway line Ústí nad Labem–Kolín runs through Brná, but there is no train station. The municipal part is served by the station in Ústí nad Labem-Střekov.

== Sport ==
Brná is known for its thermal swimming pools. It was opened in 1931. The water temperature ranges from 26.5 to 28 °C.

== Sights ==
The main historical landmark of Brná is the Chapel of Saint Anne. It was built in the late Baroque style in 1750.
