= Elbe Sluice =

- Ústí nad Labem, Czech Republic
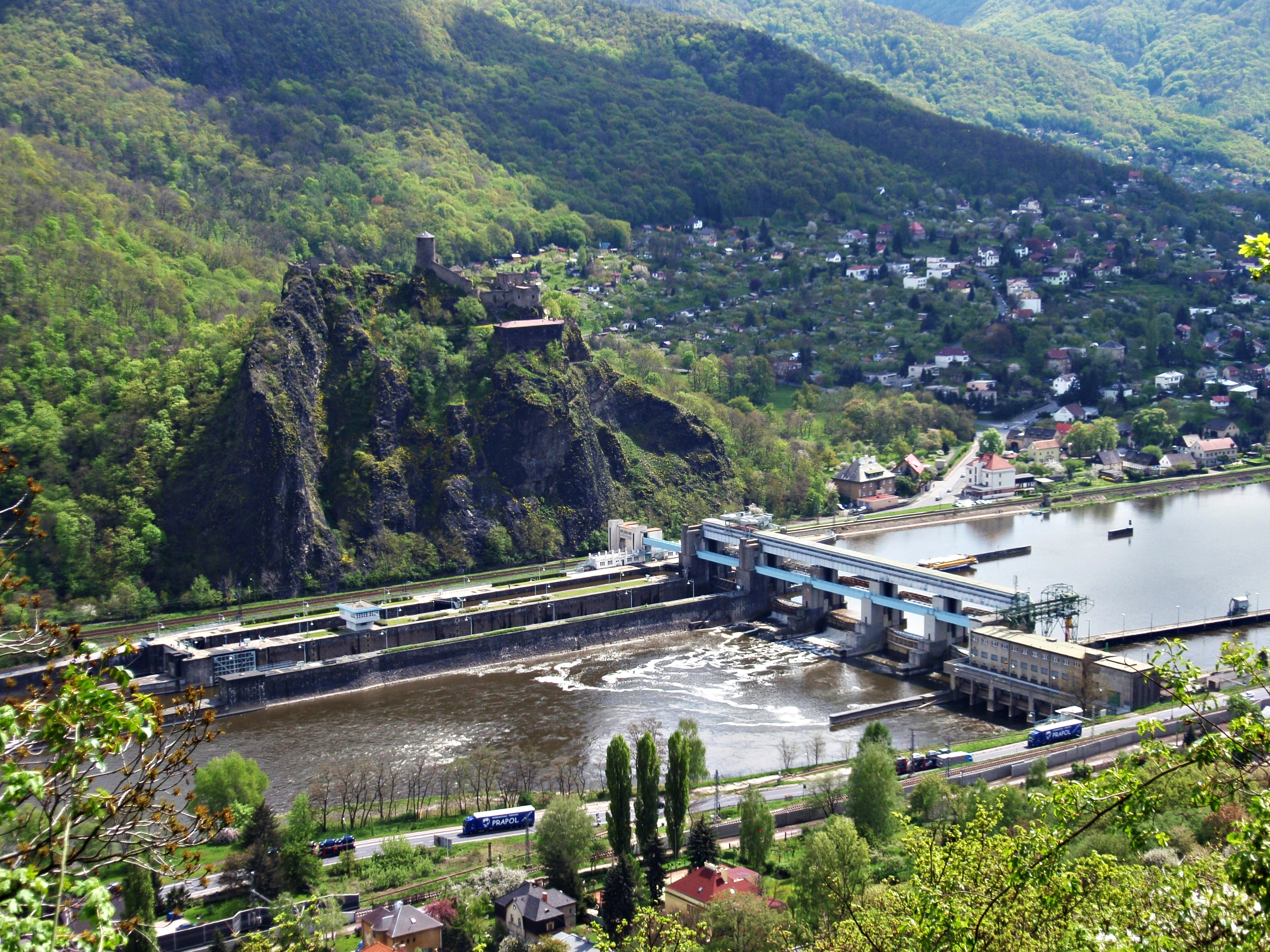
- Elbe Sluice with Střekov Castle

Site information
- Type: Waterworks

Location
- Coordinates: 50°38′19″N 14°02′53″E

Site history
- Built: 1935

The Elbe Sluice (Czech: Zdymadlo Střekov) also known as Střekov Sluice, Masaryk Sluice or Sluice of T. G. Masaryk is a lock on the Elbe river in Ústí nad Labem, Czech Republic, located immediately below the Střekov Castle.

The main purpose was to navigate the Elbe in the area of the Střekov rapids, which were often impassable. In its time it was one of the largest waterworks in the country and one with the most modern technical concept in Europe.

The hydroelectric power plant, which is part of the sluice, was put into operation in 1935. The waterworks is built in the functionalist style. The sluice is protected as a cultural monument.

== History ==
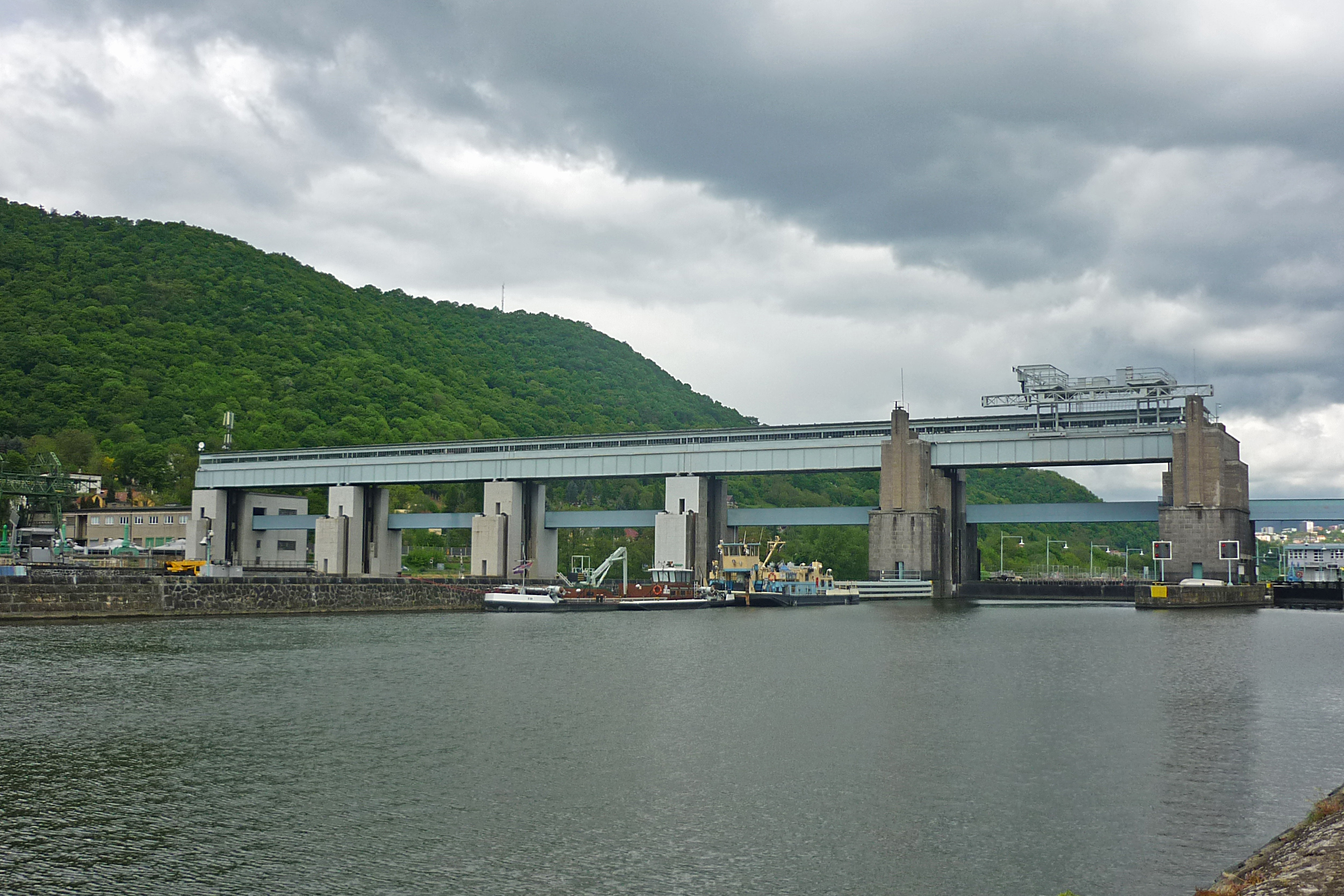
Front view

The waterworks were built in 1924–1931 according to plans of architect František Vahala. The hydroelectric power plant was put into operation in 1935.

== Description ==
Part of the waterworks are two locks, a hydroelectric station with three vertically installed Kaplan turbines. Within the facility, a differential of 10 metres in the water levels can be achieved. Part of the barrage is a fish pass. A vast bulk of the original sluice equipment has remained fully operational up to date even though their expected useful life was estimated for 20 years.

=== Weir ===
The weir is 111 m long, it is divided by three pillars into four fields, each 24 metres wide. The pillars are 5 m wide and lined with granite blocks at the bottom. The weir elevates the river to a distance of 19.8 km, the maximum height difference between the upper and lower level is 9.75 m.

=== Fish pass ===
In the pillar that separates the weir and the power plant, a chamber-type fish crossing was established in 2002 replacing the original, defunct, one. To accommodate the large difference in water levels, its length is 253 m. It is equipped with three adjustable cross walls and with an observation point for the migration control. However, years of experience have shown that only some medium-sized fish migrate through it. In 2017 a study was published on "Promoting migration of salmon at waterworks Střekov" with suggestions on how to rebuild the sluice so it can accommodate passage of larger fish such as salmon.

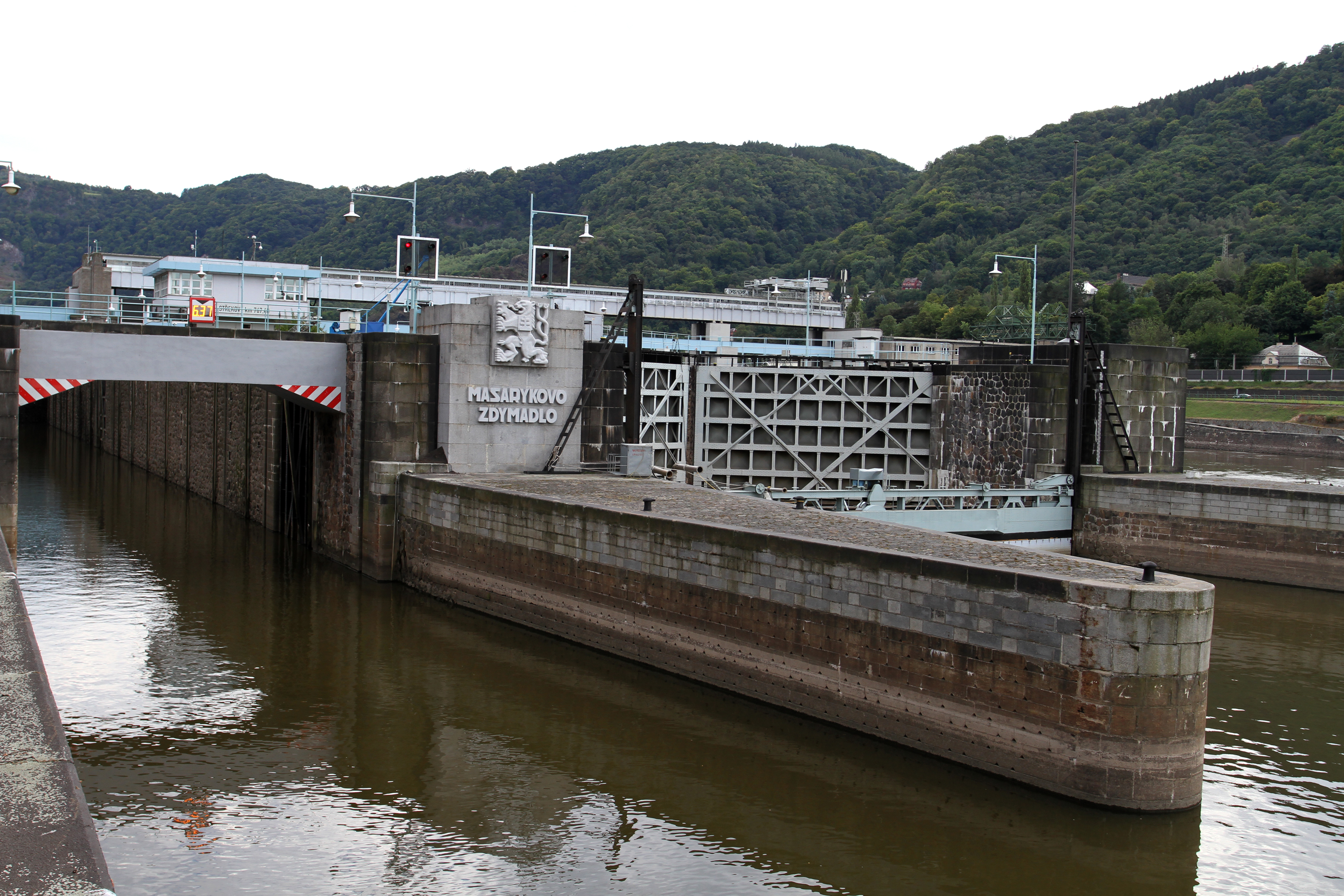
Lock

=== Chambers ===
There are two lock chambers, a small one measuring 2 × 82.5 m × 13 m and a large one measuring 170 m × 24 m.

The Elbe road is one of the most important waterways in the Czech Republic. Two and a half thousand ships got through this lock in 2010.

=== Hydroelectric power plant ===
Three vertical Kaplan turbines with a total output of 19.5 MW are installed in the hydroelectric power plant. This power plant engaged at all times - not only at peak energy levels, as is the prevailing custom elsewhere. Due to the unfinished river bank roads, the operating regulations allow for backwater up to 141.8 metres above the sea level. For the same reason the gradient has been reduced to 7 metres and the output to 3 × 5 MW. With a total output of 15 MW, it is the largest flow-through power plant in the Elbe basin. The average annual production is 80- 100 mil. kWh.

== Reservoir ==
The Střekov Reservoir creates a 19.8 km long lake with a total volume of 16.1 million m³. In addition to ensuring navigability, it reduces the flooding risk in the Lovosice – Zálezly section. It also allows surface water abstraction for farming purposes.

== Recognition ==
The sluice was declared a Czech cultural monument in 1958.

In 2009 the Czech National Bank issued a 2500 CZK commemorative gold coin as part of the Industrial Heritage Sites series. The coin was designed by Josef Oplištil.
