= Watkins Mill High School =

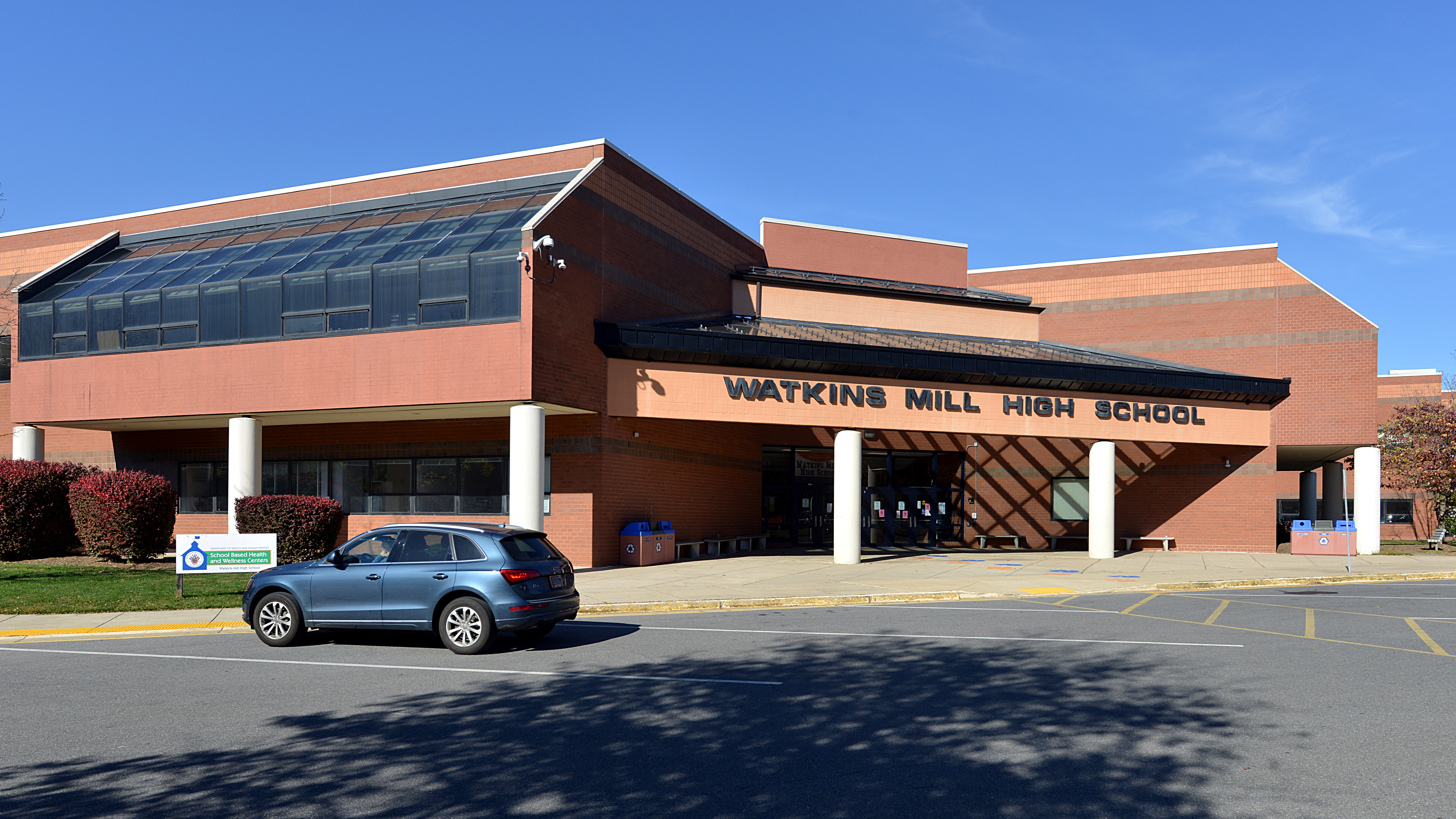

Location
- 10301 Apple Ridge Road; Gaithersburg, Maryland 20879; United States; 39°11′1″N 77°12′58″W

Information
- Type: Public high school
- Established: 1989
- School district: Montgomery County Public Schools
- Principal: Vilma Najera
- Grades: 9–12
- Enrollment: 1,660 (2016–17)
- Campus: Suburban
- Colors: Blue; Orange
- Nickname: Wolverines
- Newspaper: The Current
- Website: www.montgomeryschoolsmd.org/schools/watkinsmillhs/

Watkins Mill High School is a public high school located in Gaithersburg, an incorporated city in Montgomery County, Maryland.

The school is named after the Watkins family, who owned a mill on the property. The school opened in 1989 at 269,706 ft^{2} with a 28,140 ft^{2} addition in 1994 and a 3,733 ft^{2} in 1999 with 300 ft^{2} of renovation. The school now encompasses 301,579 ft^{2}.

Watkins Mill is home to such programs as the International Baccalaureate Program, PLTW, and Academy of Finance. Watkins Mill is part of the Montgomery County Public Schools system. It is one of four public high schools in the county to have a wellness center.

== Demographics ==
According to the Montgomery County Public Schools regulatory accountability report, the ethnic demographic breakdown of students is:

=== Ethnicity ===
- African American: 22.7%
- Hispanic: 60.9%
- Non-Hispanic White: 5.6%
- Asian: 8.2%
- American Indian/Alaska native: <5%
- Native Hawaiian or other Pacific islander: <5%

=== Services ===
- Students receiving free and reduced-price meals (FARMS): 64.4%
- English for speakers of other languages (ESOL): 31.0%
- Students receiving special education services: 12.6%

== Areas Served ==
Watkins Mill High School serves students living in Gaithersburg and Montgomery Village. It feeds from two middle schools and four elementary school zones:

- Montgomery Village Middle School
  - Stedwick Elementary School
  - Watkins Mill Elementary School
  - Whetstone Elementary School
- Neelsville Middle School
  - South Lake Elementary School
  - Stedwick Elementary School

Elementary School Split Articulations:

- Some portions of Stedwick ES matriculate to Montgomery Village MS, while others go to Neelsville MS

== Athletics ==
Watkins Mill High School offers the following sports:

- Baseball (boys)
- Basketball (boys & girls)
- Bocce (coed)
- Cheerleading (coed)
- Cross Country (boys & girls)
- Field Hockey (girls)
- Football (boys)
- Golf (coed)
- Indoor Track (boys & girls)
- Lacrosse (boys & girls)
- Poms (girls)
- Soccer (boys & girls)
- Softball (girls)
- Swim & Dive (boys & girls)
- Tennis (boys & girls)
- Track & Field (boys & girls)
- Volleyball (boys, girls, & coed)
- Wrestling (boys)

The school mascot is Wally the Wolverine and the school colors are blue and orange.

In 2011, Watkins Mill won the 3A Maryland boys state soccer title.

== Notable alumni ==
- Justin Carter (born 1987), basketball player for Maccabi Kiryat Gat of the Israeli Premier League
- Paul Rabil, professional lacrosse player for Atlas Lacrosse Club and founder of the Premier Lacrosse League (attended Watkins Mill during his freshman year)
- Telfar Clemens, Liberian-American fashion designer and founder of the label TELFAR
- Chris Van Dusen, TV writer and producer, creator of Bridgerton (class of 1997)
- Submerged (DJ) (Kurt Gluck), musician and DJ (class of 1996)
- Petra Gelbart Romani activist and musician (class of 1996)
