= Schreckensteiner =

German wine

Schreckensteiner was a Bohemian wine known for its quality. It was grown at the foot of the ruined Schreckenstein (Střekov) Castle on south facing slopes on the right bank of the River Elbe near the Bohemian city of Aussig which is now Ústí nad Labem in the Czech Republic.

It may have given its name to the additional staking pot in the game of German Tarok which was known in Bohemia.

== Literature ==
- _ (1889). Tarok (Sans prendre). Munich: Grau.
- Schnabel, Dr. G. R. (1846). Statistik der landwirthschaftlichen Industrie von Böhmen ["Statistics for the Agricultural Industry of Bohemia"]. Prague: J.G Calve.
