= Polepy (Litoměřice District) =

- Municipality
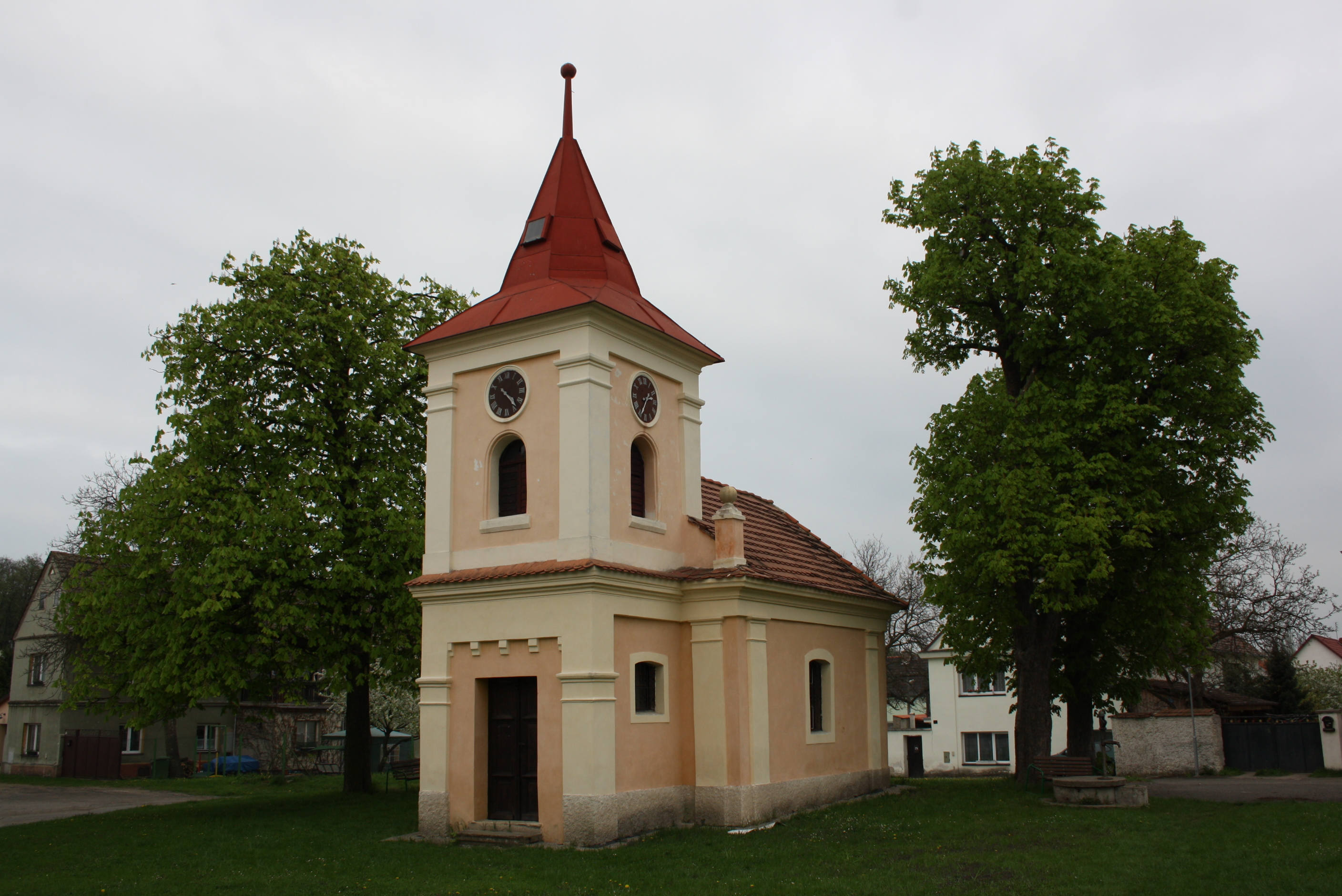
- Chapel of the Holy Apostles

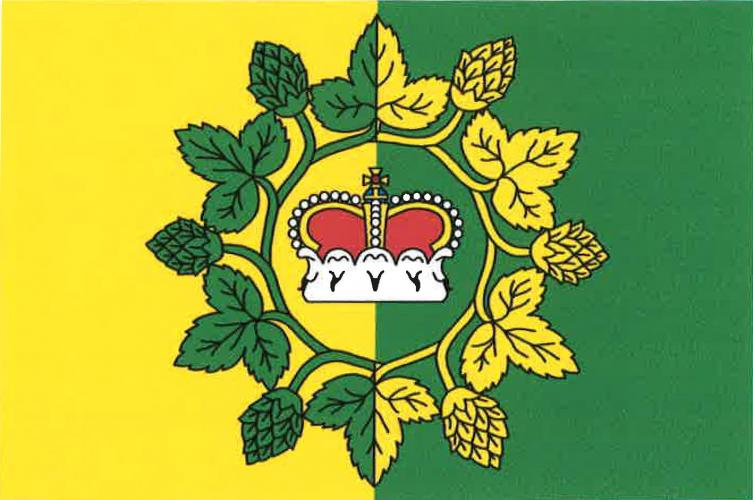
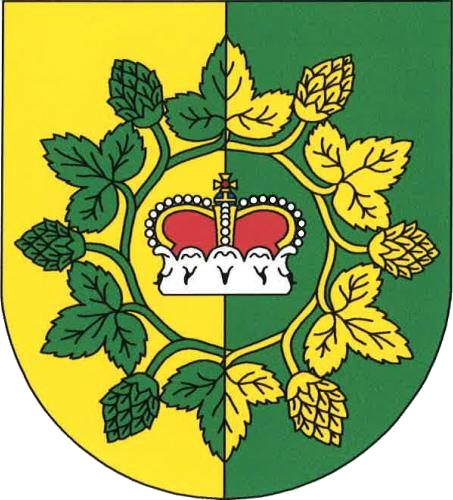
- Flag Coat of arms

- Location in the Czech Republic
- Coordinates: 50°30′21″N 14°15′52″E
- Country: Czech Republic
- Region: Ústí nad Labem
- District: Litoměřice
- First mentioned: 1227

Area
  - Total: 18.33 km^{2} (7.08 sq mi)
- Elevation: 150 m (490 ft)

Population (2026-01-01)
  - Total: 1,323
  - Density: 72.18/km^{2} (186.9/sq mi)
- Time zone: UTC+1 (CET)
  - Summer (DST): UTC+2 (CEST)
- Postal code: 411 47
- Website: www.obec-polepy.cz

Polepy is a municipality and village in Litoměřice District in the Ústí nad Labem Region of the Czech Republic. It has about 1,300 inhabitants.

== Administrative division ==
Polepy consists of six municipal parts (in brackets population according to the 2021 census):

- Polepy (680)
- Encovany (184)
- Hrušovany (173)
- Libínky (138)
- Okna (81)
- Třebutičky (13)

== Etymology ==
The name is derived from the verb polepovat ('to glue'). It denoted a village of people who glue something.

== Geography ==
Polepy is located about 10 kilometres (6 mi) east of Litoměřice and 23 km (14 mi) southeast of Ústí nad Labem. Most of the municipal territory lies in the Ralsko Uplands, but the southern part with the village of Polepy lies in the Lower Ohře Table. The highest point is at 370 m (1,214 ft) above sea level. The stream Úštěcký potok flows through the municipality.

== History ==
The first written mention of Polepy is from 1227.

== Demographics ==
Historical population

Year	Pop.	±%
1869	1,936	—
1880	2,151	+11.1%
1890	2,265	+5.3%
1900	2,284	+0.8%
1910	2,212	−3.2%

Year	Pop.	±%
1921	2,134	−3.5%
1930	2,353	+10.3%
1950	1,420	−39.7%
1961	1,399	−1.5%
1970	1,342	−4.1%

Year	Pop.	±%
1980	1,209	−9.9%
1991	1,106	−8.5%
2001	1,146	+3.6%
2011	1,263	+10.2%
2021	1,269	+0.5%

Source: Censuses

== Transport ==
Polepy is located on the railway line Ústí nad Labem–Lysá nad Labem.

== Sport ==
The football field in the municipality was the site of motorcycle speedway track in the 1960s and 1970s. The venue hosted a final round of the Czechoslovak Individual Speedway Championship for four consecutive years from 1966 to 1969.

== Sights ==
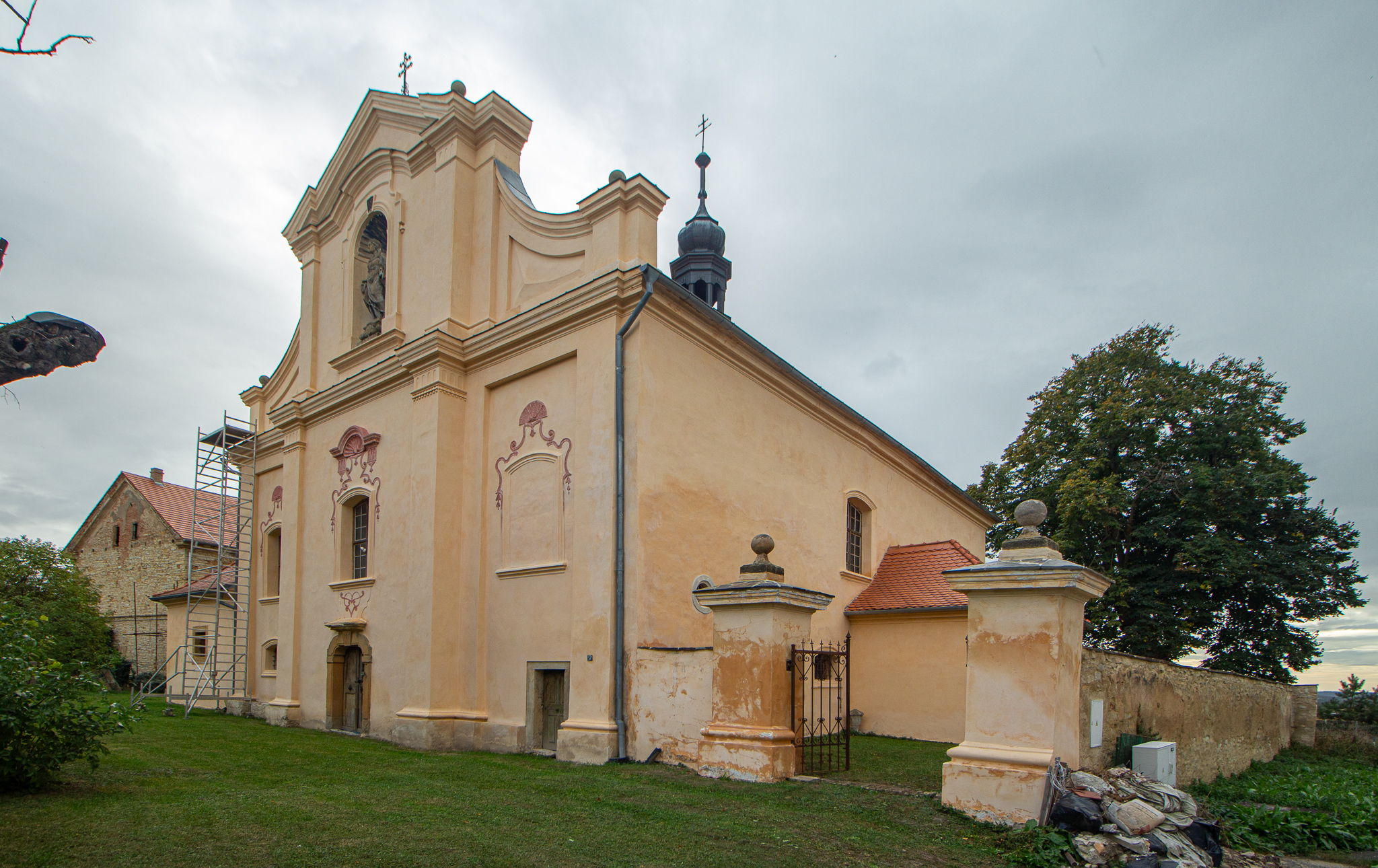
Church of the Nativity of the Virgin Mary in Hrušovany

The most valuable building is the Church of the Nativity of the Virgin Mary in Hrušovany. It was built in the Gothic style in the 14th century and extended in the 16th century. Around 1735, it was rebuilt in the Baroque style. Next to the church is a separate bell tower from the 16th century.
