= Sebuzín =

- Village
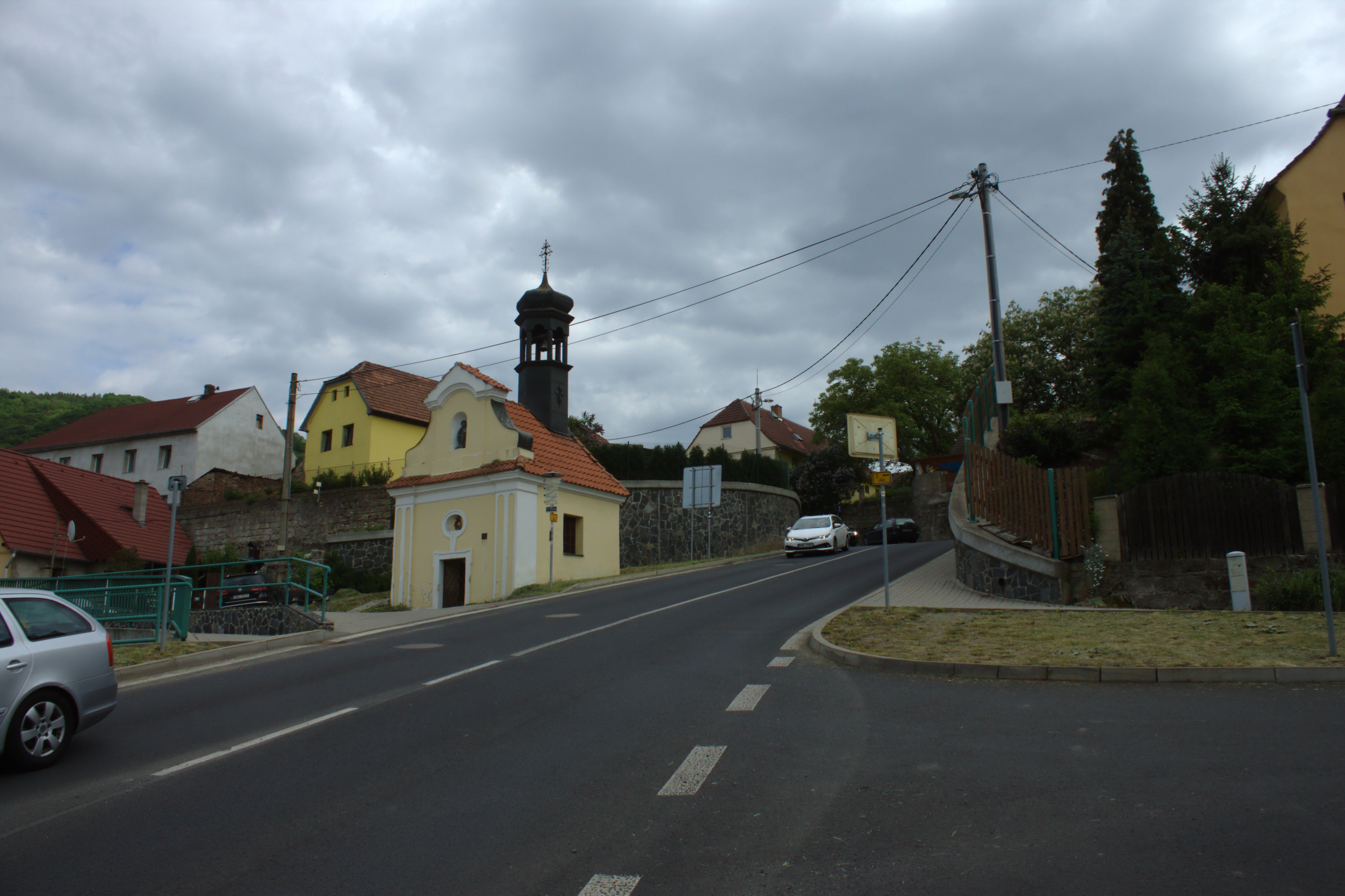
- Chapel of Saint Vincent Ferrer

- Location in the Czech Republic
- Coordinates: 50°35′40″N 14°3′54″E
- Country: Czech Republic
- Region: Ústí nad Labem
- District: Ústí nad Labem
- Municipality: Ústí nad Labem
- First mentioned: 1251

Area
  - Total: 7.24 km^{2} (2.80 sq mi)
- Elevation: 158 m (518 ft)

Population (2021)
  - Total: 503
  - Density: 69.5/km^{2} (180/sq mi)
- Time zone: UTC+1 (CET)
  - Summer (DST): UTC+2 (CEST)
- Postal code: 403 02

Sebuzín is a village and municipal part of Ústí nad Labem in Ústí nad Labem District in the Ústí nad Labem Region of the Czech Republic. It is located on the right bank of the Elbe River. Until 1980, it was a separate municipality.

== Etymology ==
The initial name of the village was probably Chcebuzín. The name was derived from the personal name Chcebud, meaning "Chcebud's".

== Geography ==
Sebuzín is located in the southernmost part of the territory of Ústí nad Labem and within the České středohoří Protected Landscape Area. It lies in the Central Bohemian Uplands. The highest point is the hill Matrý at 594 m (1,949 ft) above sea level. The municipal part is situated on the right bank of the Elbe River.

== History ==
The first written mention of Sebuzín is from 1251. Until 1580, it was owned by a local noble family who called themselves Barons of Sebuzín. After 1580, the village was divided into two parts that had different owners. The first part belonged to the Litoměřice estate and later to the Lovosice estate. The second part belonged to the Kamýk estate. The sovereign municipality of Sebuzín was established in 1848, but in 1980, it was merged with Ústí nad Labem.

== Demographics ==
Historical population

Year	Pop.	±%
1869	539	—
1880	547	+1.5%
1890	536	−2.0%
1900	566	+5.6%
1910	669	+18.2%

Year	Pop.	±%
1921	652	−2.5%
1930	679	+4.1%
1950	537	−20.9%
1961	551	+2.6%
1970	479	−13.1%

Year	Pop.	±%
1980	438	−8.6%
1991	347	−20.8%
2001	366	+5.5%
2011	443	+21.0%
2021	503	+13.5%

Source: Censuses

== Transport ==
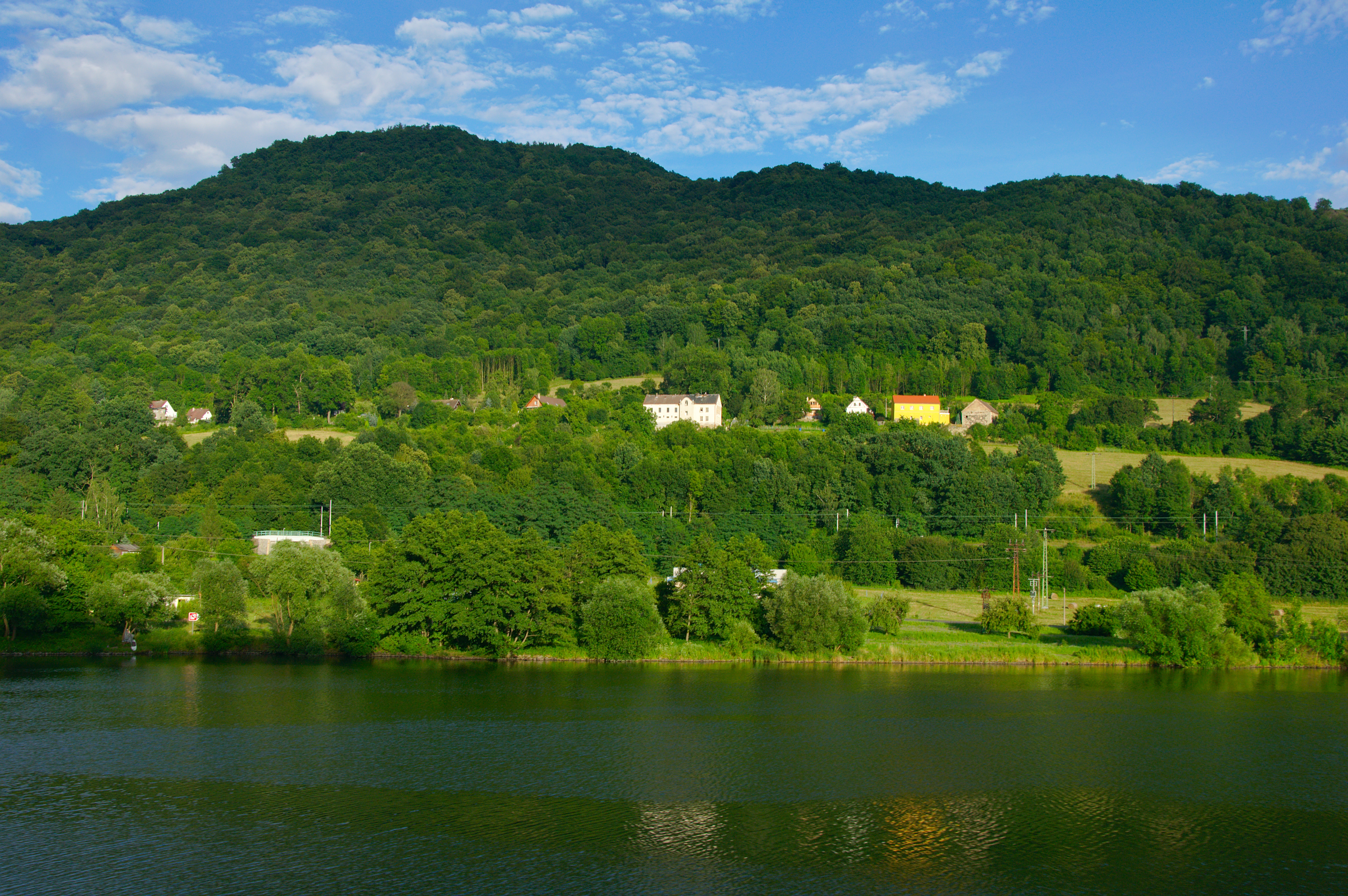
View of Sebuzín from the west

Sebuzín is located on the railway line Ústí nad Labem–Lysá nad Labem.

== Sights ==
The main historical landmark of Sebuzín is the Chapel of Saint Vincent Ferrer. It was built in the late Baroque style in 1745. There is a sculpture in the niche and an iron bell in the pinnacle.
