= Petra Gelbart =

Czech human rights activist (born 1978)

- Born: 1978 (age 47–48); Ústí nad Labem, Czechoslovakia
- Education: University of California, Berkeley, Harvard University
- Occupations: musicologist, musician, music therapist, human rights defender
- Years active: 2000 - present
- Known for: activism for the remembrance of the Romani genocide
- Website: Petra Gelbart Creative Arts

Petra Gelbart (born 1978) is a musicologist, musician, music therapist and human rights defender. Born in former Czechoslovakia, she has lived in the United States since 1988. Mainly active for the human rights of Romani people, she was a curator of the music section for the RomArchive in Berlin, Germany. Active in several Romani organizations since 2000, Gelbart is known both for her research, public speaking and musical performances focusing on the remembrance of the Romani genocide in Europe.

== Life and career ==
Born in 1978 in Ústí nad Labem, Czechoslovakia, Gelbart is a granddaughter of survivors of the Romani Holocaust, the genocide against Romani people during Nazi rule in Europe. Her mother was a Romni, and Gelbart learned the Romani language and music in her family. At age ten, her family moved to the United States.

Paying for her university studies by working and later by teaching undergraduates, Gelbart first studied musicology at University of California, Berkeley. She graduated in 2010 with a PhD in musicology und ethnomusicology at Harvard University with a dissertation titled "Learning Music, Race and Nation in the Czech Republic." In 2016, she also earned an MA in music therapy at Molloy University. She started teaching at State University of New York. Her research focuses on interethnic communication, the psychology of music, the Holocaust and institutional ethnography. Further, she has been working as a board-certified music therapist since 2015.

Curating the music section for the RomArchive in Berlin, she has been investigating stereotypes about Romani music and aimed to present the entire range of musical expressions of the various forms of Roma music. As panelist, she contributed to a 2023 event at the Museum of Jewish Heritage about the history of the Holocaust of Jewish and Roma people. On 26 January 2024, Gelbart was a guest speaker at the UN Headquarters celebration of the International Day of Commemoration in Memory of the Victims of the Holocaust.

As a musician, Gelbart is a co-founder of the band Via Romen, where she performs Romani music as a singer and accordion player, and has also performed internationally as a soloist.

Apart from her work in New York City, Gelbart has been supporting foster and adoptive families raising Romani children in the Czech Republic.

== Selected publications ==
- Gelbart, Petra. "Either sing or go get the beer: Contradictions of (Romani) female power in Central Europe." Signs: Journal of women in culture and society 38.1 (2012): 22-29.
- Beckerman, Michael, Jessica Schwartz, Roland Huntford, Roger Buckton, Michael Cwach, Kevin C. Karnes, Timothy J. Cooley, Bret Werb, Petra Gelbart, and Jeffrey A. Summit. "Auditory Snapshots from the Edges of Europe." Transactions of the Royal Historical Society 22 (2012): 199-221.
- Gelbart, Petra. "A Song of Auschwitz". romarchive.eu.
- Gelbart, Petra. "Is There Such a Thing as Romani Music?". romarchive.eu.
