= Střekov Castle =

14th-century castle in the Czech Republic

Coordinates: 50°38′21″N 14°03′03″E

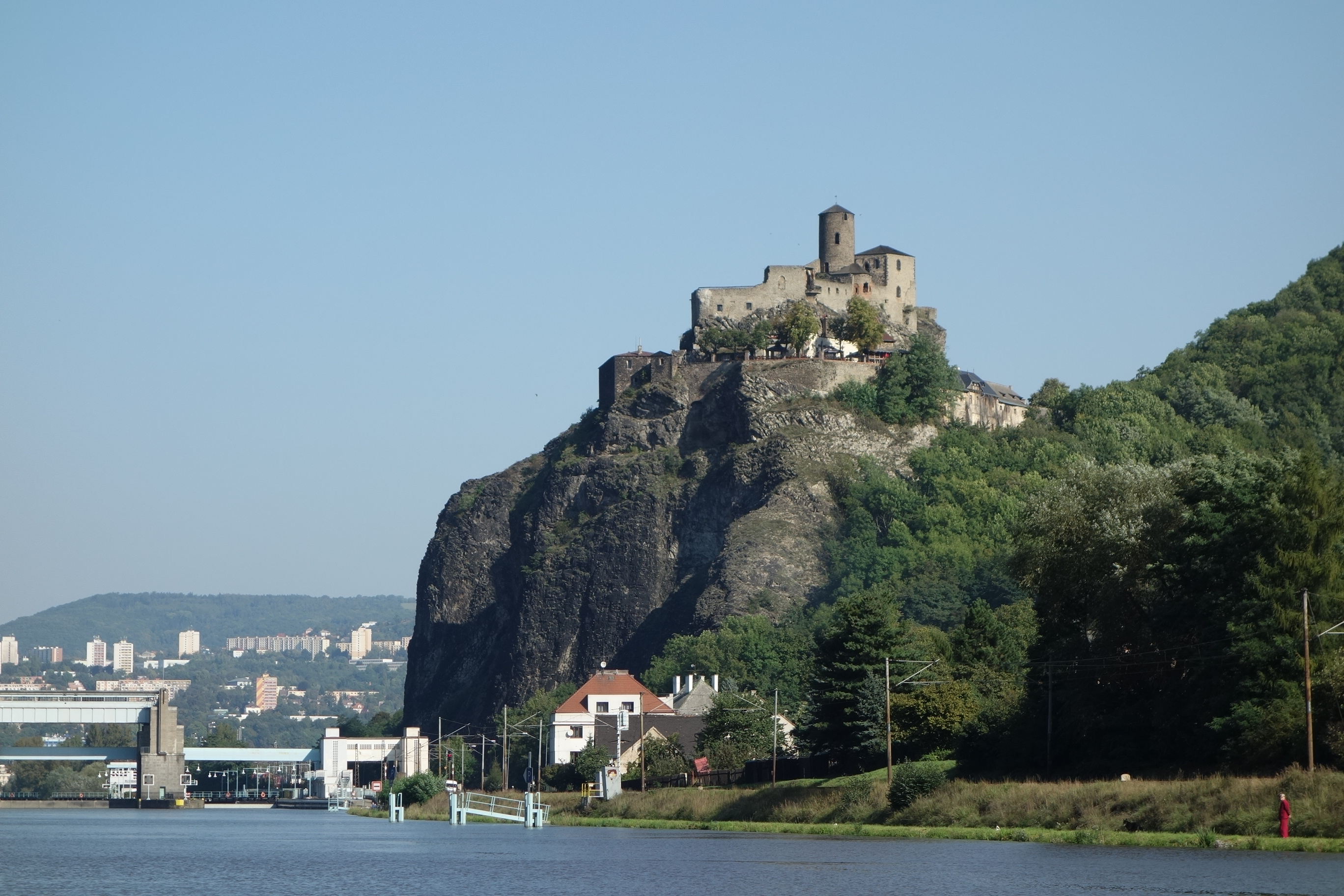
The castle seen from Ústí nad Labem-Vaňov

Střekov Castle (Czech: hrad Střekov, German: Burg Schreckenstein) is a ruined castle in Ústí nad Labem in the Central Bohemian Highlands in the Czech Republic. It is perched atop a cliff above the Elbe river. It was built in the 14th century to protect the waterway and collect duties on transported goods, and is renowned for its impressive views.

It has enchanted a variety of visiting artists, most notably Goethe, Richard Wagner, and Karel Hynek Mácha. The castle is especially well known from the painting by Ludwig Richter called Passing the Schreckenstein (Überfahrt am Schreckenstein) which hangs in the Galerie Neue Meister in Dresden.

The castle is perched atop a steep, monolithic, clinkstone rock that rises steeply to 100 metres above the Elbe and is the symbol of North Bohemia. Large parts of the castle have survived or been rebuilt, including the bergfried, palas and castle walls.

== History ==
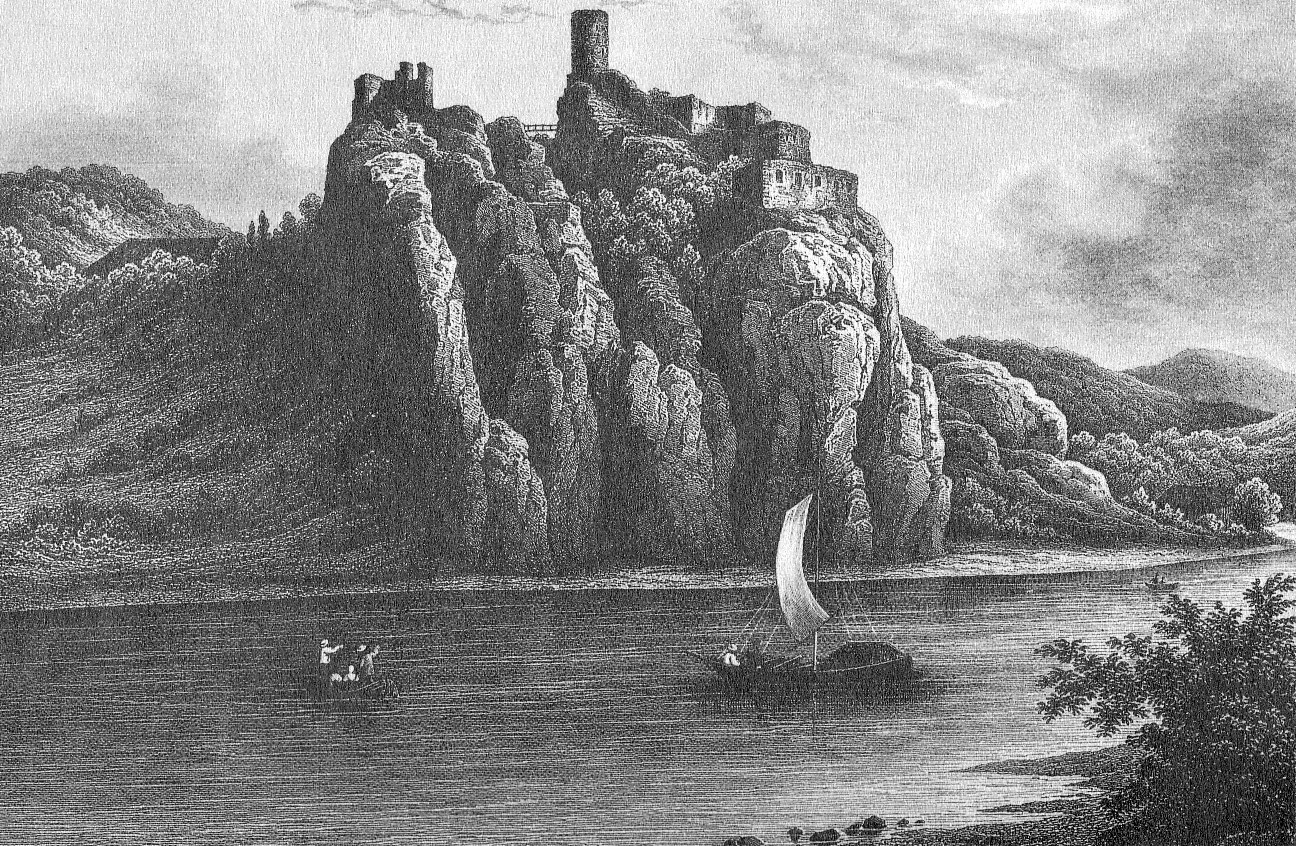
Appearance around 1850

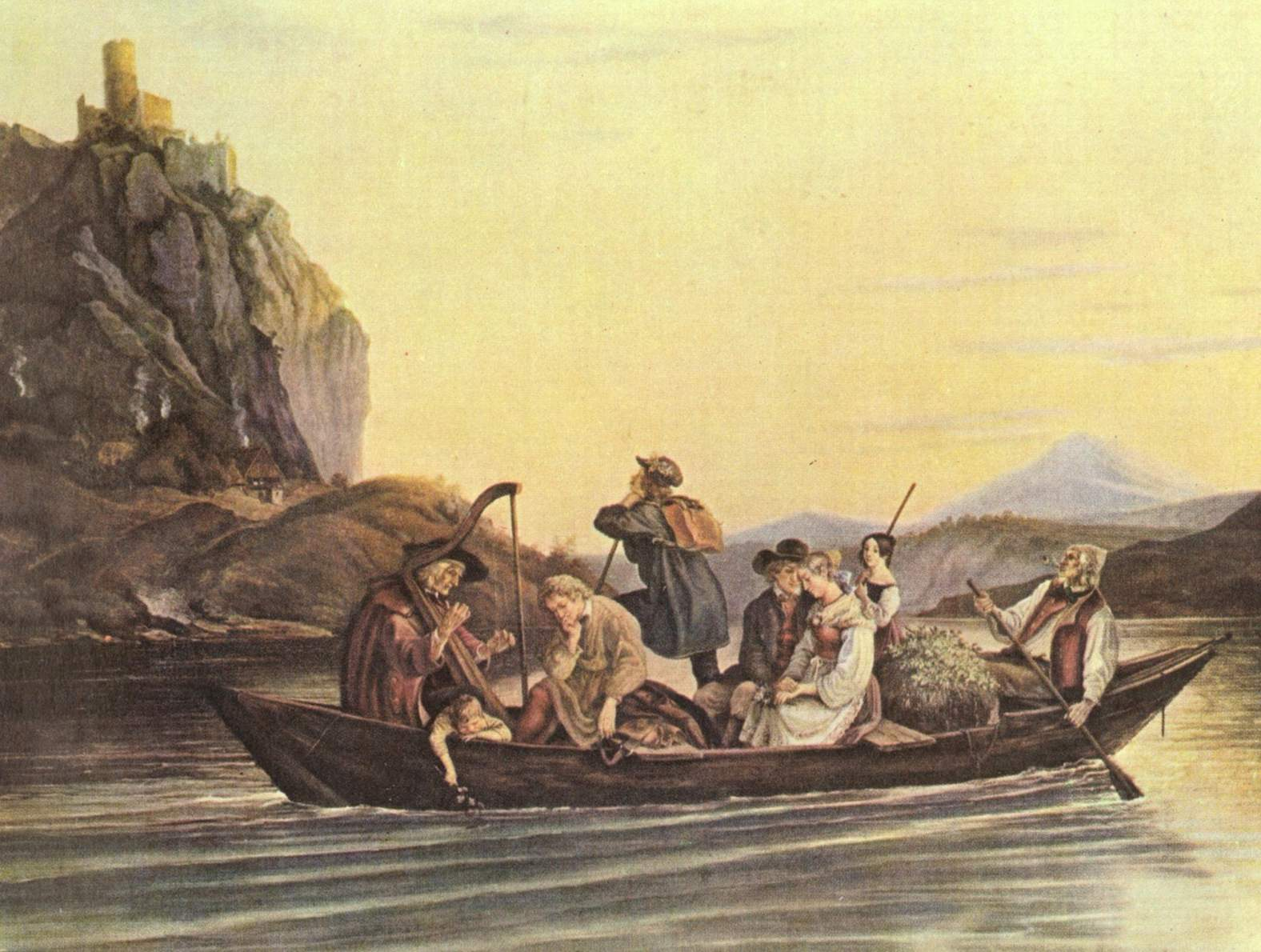
Passing the Schreckenstein (Überfahrt am Schreckenstein) by Ludwig Richter

The castle was built in 1316 for King John of Bohemia, the father of the Emperor Charles IV, to guard an important trade route to Germany. Schreckenstein was first mentioned in 1319, when Pešek of Weitmühl was given the new castle as a fief. Only shortly afterwards, Schreckenstein came into the possession of the Bohemian House of Wartenberg from Tetschen (now Děčín). In the Hussite Wars (1419–1434), many persecuted Catholics found refuge on Schreckenstein.

After changing hands several times, the castle was acquired by the Lobkowicz family in 1563 when Wenzel Popel of Lobkowicz became castellan. Around 1570, the castle was rebuilt and expanded. In 1601, the castle passed into the direct possession of the House of Lobkowicz. At the beginning of the 17th century, the castle was no longer permanently inhabited and gradually fell into disrepair.

Its strategic importance led to occupations by Imperial Habsburg, Saxon, and Swedish forces during the Thirty Years' War, as well as successive sieges by Austrian and Prussian armies during the Seven Years' War. It was plundered several times and was heavily damaged during those conflicts, being abandoned as a military installation by the end of the 18th century. However, the 1800s saw many poets and artists visiting the castle, drawn by a new trend of interest in romantic ruins. Well known painters such as Ludwig Richter, Caspar David Friedrich and Ernst Gustav Doerell stayed at the castle and captured it in romantic paintings. Goethe declared the view from the castle's position above the Elbe to be the most beautiful in Central Europe, while Richard Wagner's opera Tannhäuser was supposedly inspired by his visit to Schreckenstein. In 1830, the first castle inn was set up in the former domestic courtyard, and it still exists today.

In 1948, the castle was confiscated from the Lobkowicz family after almost 400 years and became state property. In 1953, the monument was placed under a preservation order. In 1990, the castle was returned to the Lobkowicz family.

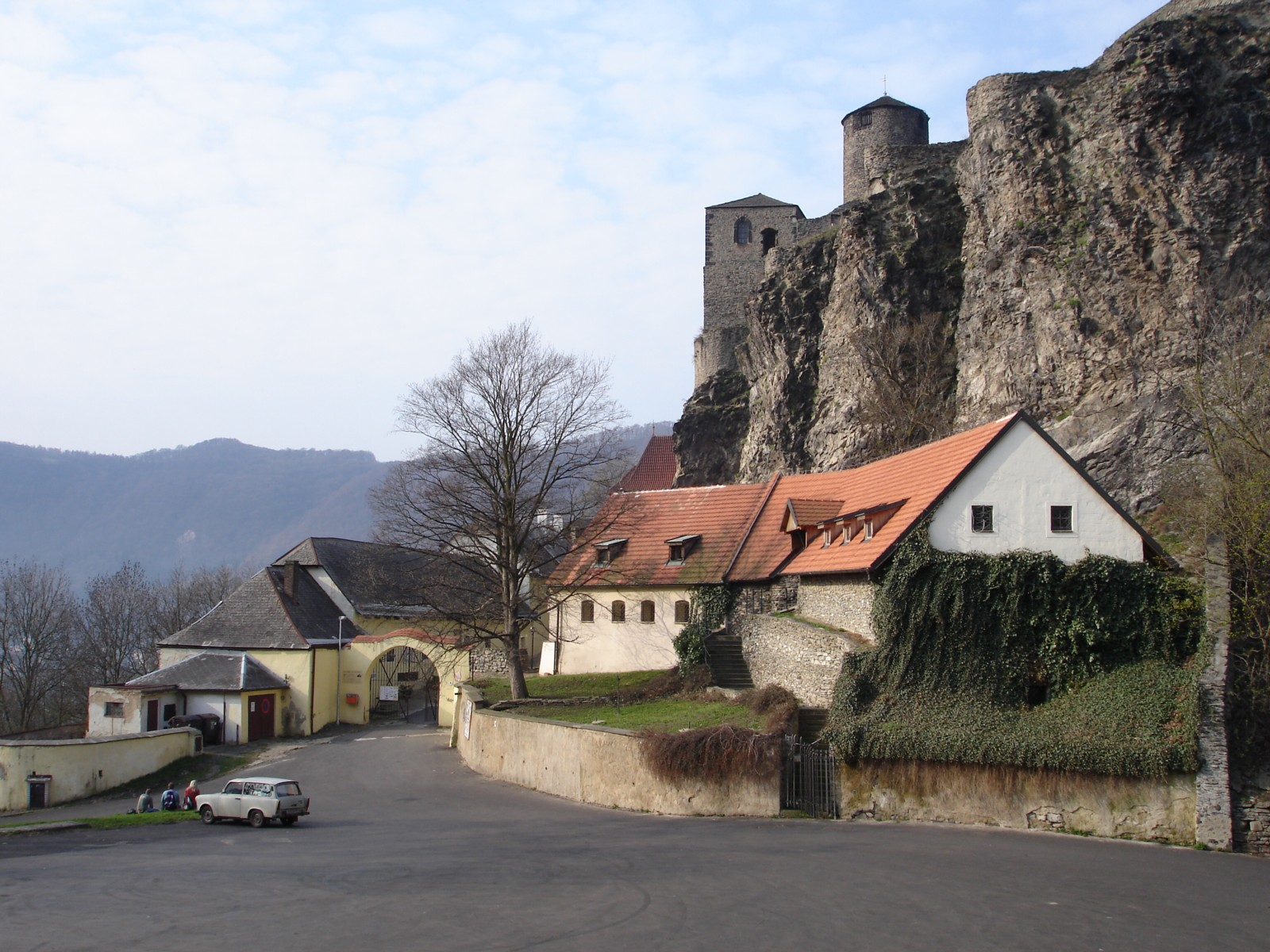
The castle gateway

The first preservation work on the castle ruins was carried out at the end of the 19th century and in 1911–1912. A caesura for the castle was the construction of the Elbe Sluice in 1923–1936 directly beneath the castle rock. As important as this dam is for safe navigation on the Elbe, the facility is a particularly blatant example of the destruction of a cultural landscape.

In the 1999 film The Hard Dracula, Střekov served as the backdrop for the castle of Count Dracula.

Wine known as Schreckensteiner was grown in the vicinity of the castle in the 19th century.

== Architecture ==
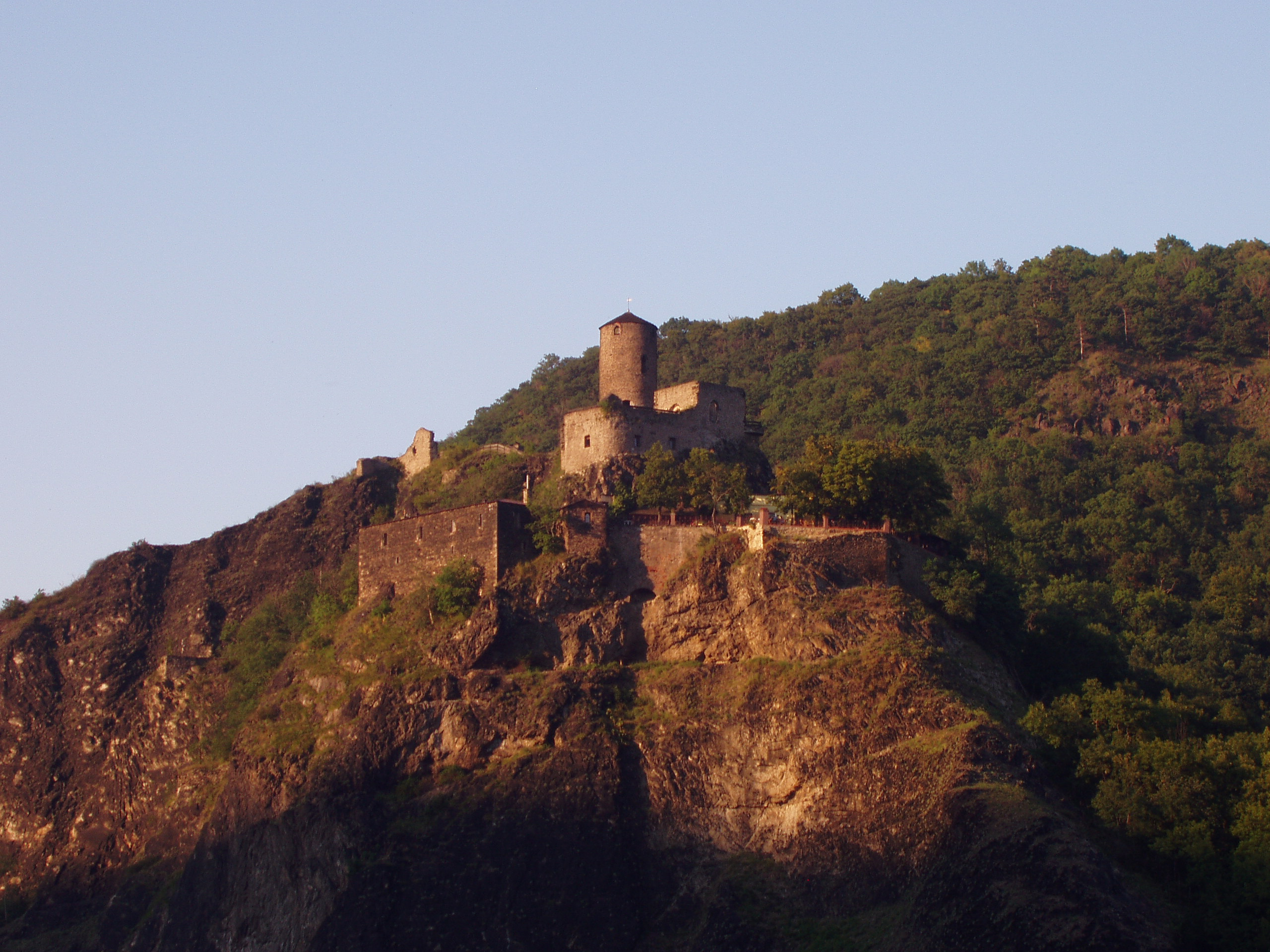
Střekov Castle

Střekov Castle is divided into two sections connected by an arched bridge spanning a natural moat—an unusual style for the 14th century, when it was first built. The castle's semi-circular bastions, inspired by French architecture, are possibly the first example of that type of defensive design in Bohemia. The connecting round tower, a smaller tower guarding the castle entrance, and an irregular oblong section of the castle date back to the very earliest period of construction.
