= Zálezly =

- Municipality
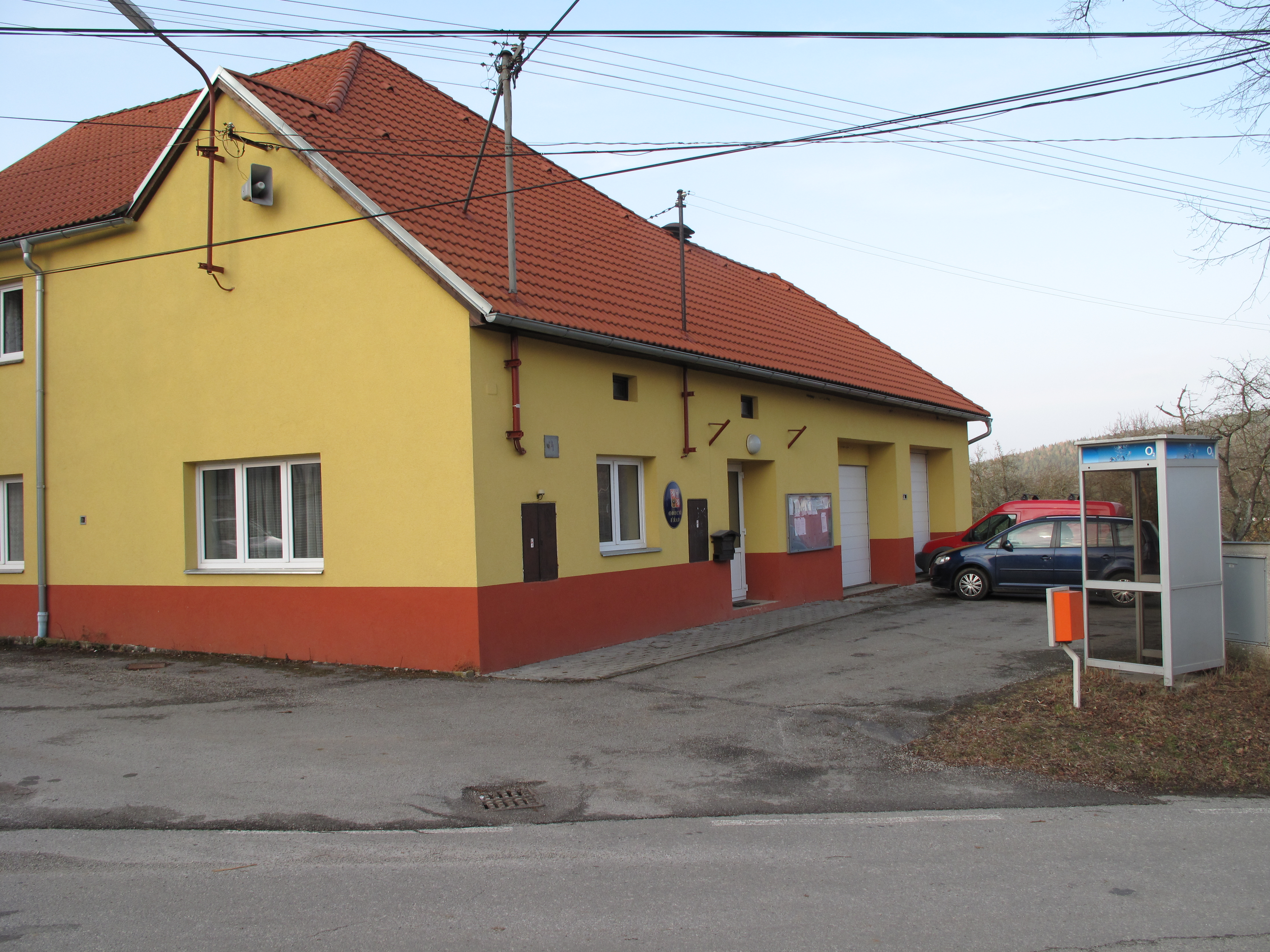
- Municipal office

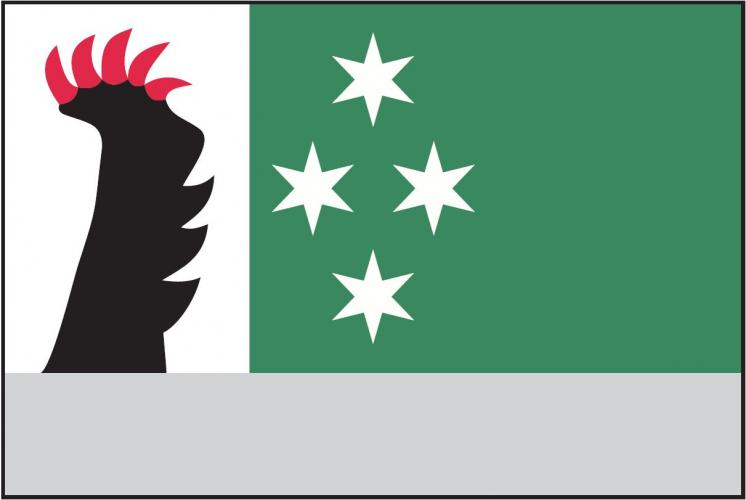
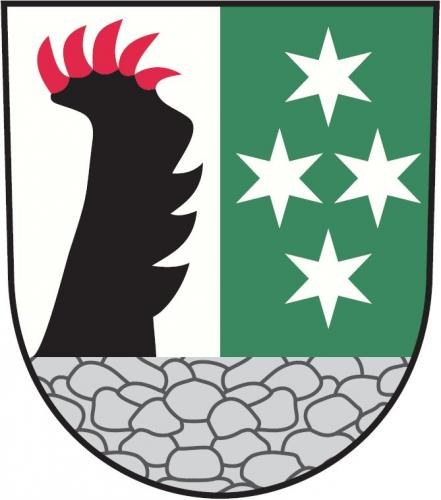
- Flag Coat of arms

- Location in the Czech Republic
- Coordinates: 49°6′27″N 13°53′41″E
- Country: Czech Republic
- Region: South Bohemian
- District: Prachatice
- First mentioned: 1370

Area
  - Total: 9.31 km^{2} (3.59 sq mi)
- Elevation: 565 m (1,854 ft)

Population (2026-01-01)
  - Total: 344
  - Density: 36.9/km^{2} (95.7/sq mi)
- Time zone: UTC+1 (CET)
  - Summer (DST): UTC+2 (CEST)
- Postal code: 384 81
- Website: www.zalezly.cz

Zálezly is a municipality and village in Prachatice District in the South Bohemian Region of the Czech Republic. It has about 300 inhabitants.

Zálezly lies approximately 14 kilometres (9 mi) north-west of Prachatice, 46 km (29 mi) west of České Budějovice, and 117 km (73 mi) south of Prague.

== Administrative division ==
Zálezly consists of four municipal parts (in brackets population according to the 2021 census):

- Zálezly (180)
- Bolíkovice (24)
- Kovanín (64)
- Setěchovice (45)

== Demographics ==
Historical population
Year	Pop.	±%
1869	765	—
1880	737	−3.7%
1890	760	+3.1%
1900	800	+5.3%
1910	770	−3.7%
1921	705	−8.4%
1930	660	−6.4%
1950	509	−22.9%
1961	551	+8.3%
1970	470	−14.7%
1980	373	−20.6%
1991	339	−9.1%
2001	312	−8.0%
2011	300	−3.8%
2021	313	+4.3%
Source: Censuses
