= Ústí nad Labem =

- Statutory city
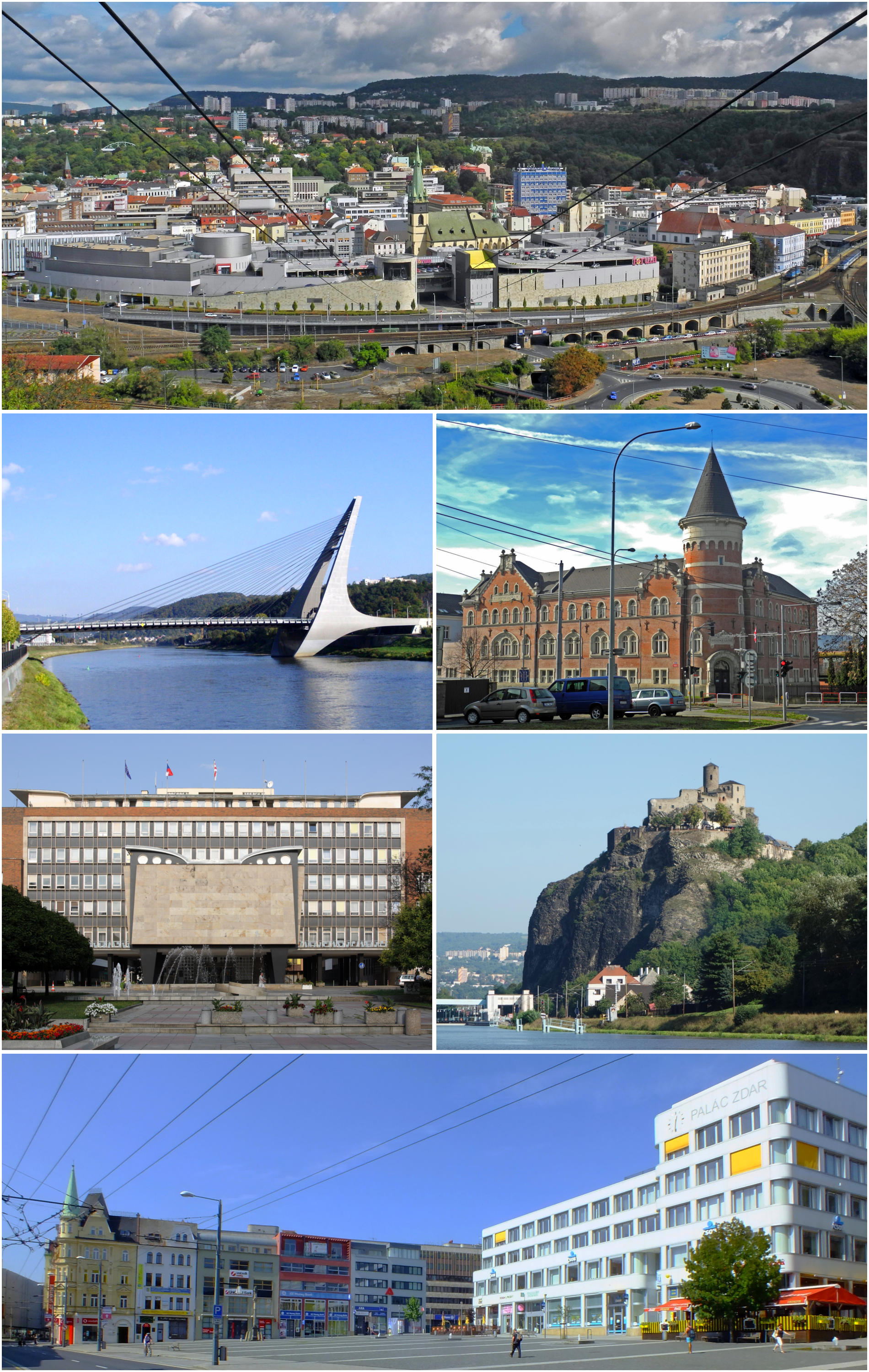
- From top: city centre view, Mariánský most, city spa, city hall, Střekov Castle, Náměstí Míru

- Flag Coat of arms

- Location in the Czech Republic
- Coordinates: 50°39′30″N 14°2′30″E
- Country: Czech Republic
- Region: Ústí nad Labem
- District: Ústí nad Labem
- First mentioned: 1056–1057

Government
  - Mayor: Petr Nedvědický (ANO)

Area
  - Total: 93.97 km^{2} (36.28 sq mi)
- Elevation: 218 m (715 ft)

Population (2026-01-01)
  - Total: 90,035
  - Density: 958.1/km^{2} (2,482/sq mi)
- Time zone: UTC+1 (CET)
  - Summer (DST): UTC+2 (CEST)
- Postal codes: 400 01 – 400 03, 400 07, 400 10, 400 11, 403 02, 403 21, 403 22, 403 31, 403 40
- Website: www.usti-nad-labem.cz

Ústí nad Labem (Czech pronunciation: [ˈuːsciː ˈnad labɛm]; German: Aussig) is a city in the northwest of the Czech Republic. It has about 90,000 inhabitants and is the capital of the Ústí nad Labem Region. The city is located at the confluence of the Elbe and Bílina rivers. Together with Chomutov, Teplice, Most and Děčín, Ústí nad Labem forms the Ústí nad Labem-Chomutov agglomeration with about 550,000 inhabitants.

Ústí nad Labem was founded in the 12th century and became a royal town in 1249. However, its size and importance only grew significantly thanks to industrialisation in the 19th century. The city is a major industrial centre with a tradition in the chemical industry. It is both an active river port on the Elbe and an important railway junction. The city is a natural regional centre of education and home to the Jan Evangelista Purkyně University in Ústí nad Labem.

Among the main landmarks of Ústí nad Labem are the Střekov Castle and the Church of the Assumption of the Virgin Mary with a leaning tower. A major tourist destination is the Ústí nad Labem Zoo.

== Administrative division ==
Ústí nad Labem is divided into four self-governing boroughs. In addition, Ústí nad Labem consists of 22 municipal parts (in brackets population according to the 2021 census):

- Ústí nad Labem-město (35,015)
  - Božtěšice (496)
  - Bukov (5,988)
  - Habrovice (395)
  - Hostovice (249)
  - Klíše (6,944)
  - Předlice (1,544)
  - Skorotice (1,379)
  - Strážky (234)
  - Vaňov (755)
  - Všebořice (2,870)
  - Ústí nad Labem-centrum (14,161)
- Ústí nad Labem-Neštěmice (22,148)
  - Krásné Březno (12,417)
  - Mojžíř (4,222)
  - Neštěmice (5,509)
- Ústí nad Labem-Severní Terasa (18,965)
  - Severní Terasa (18,965)
- Ústí nad Labem-Střekov (13,585)
  - Brná (1,308)
  - Církvice (179)
  - Kojetice (129)
  - Olešnice (89)
  - Sebuzín (503)
  - Střekov (10,249)
  - Svádov (1,128)

== Etymology ==
The name Ústí means 'river mouth' in Czech and refers to the mouth of the Bílina, which lies immediately south of the city centre. The suffix nad Labem means 'on the Elbe', and serves to distinguish the city from the other places called Ústí in the Czech Republic. The German name Aussig (earlier Ausk or Usk) derives from Úsť, an abbreviated form of the Czech name. Before Czechoslovak independence, it was the usual name for the city in English.

== Geography ==
Ústí nad Labem is located about 65 kilometres (40 mi) north of Prague and 45 km (28 mi) south of Dresden in Germany. It lies mostly in a hilly landscape of the Central Bohemian Uplands, but it also extends into the Most Basin in the northwest. The highest point is the hill Široký vrch at 659 m (2,162 ft) above sea level. The city is situated at the confluence of the Elbe and Bílina rivers. Half of Lake Milada lies in the municipal territory. The southern part of the territory lies in the České středohoří Protected Landscape Area.

=== Climate ===
Climate data for Ústí nad Labem, 1991–2020 normals, extremes 1975–present
Month	Jan	Feb	Mar	Apr	May	Jun	Jul	Aug	Sep	Oct	Nov	Dec	Year
Record high °C (°F)	15.9 (60.6)	16.3 (61.3)	23.1 (73.6)	27.5 (81.5)	29.8 (85.6)	36.7 (98.1)	36.0 (96.8)	36.6 (97.9)	31.1 (88.0)	25.4 (77.7)	17.0 (62.6)	15.4 (59.7)	36.6 (97.9)
Mean daily maximum °C (°F)	1.3 (34.3)	3.1 (37.6)	7.6 (45.7)	14.1 (57.4)	18.5 (65.3)	21.7 (71.1)	23.9 (75.0)	23.9 (75.0)	18.6 (65.5)	12.2 (54.0)	6.0 (42.8)	2.1 (35.8)	12.7 (54.9)
Daily mean °C (°F)	−1.2 (29.8)	0.1 (32.2)	3.7 (38.7)	9.1 (48.4)	13.3 (55.9)	16.4 (61.5)	18.4 (65.1)	18.1 (64.6)	13.5 (56.3)	8.4 (47.1)	3.4 (38.1)	−0.2 (31.6)	8.6 (47.5)
Mean daily minimum °C (°F)	−3.2 (26.2)	−2.4 (27.7)	0.6 (33.1)	5.0 (41.0)	8.8 (47.8)	11.9 (53.4)	13.9 (57.0)	13.7 (56.7)	9.9 (49.8)	5.7 (42.3)	1.5 (34.7)	−2.1 (28.2)	5.3 (41.5)
Record low °C (°F)	−22.1 (−7.8)	−19.5 (−3.1)	−14.0 (6.8)	−7.1 (19.2)	−3.2 (26.2)	2.4 (36.3)	6.4 (43.5)	5.2 (41.4)	1.2 (34.2)	−4.8 (23.4)	−12.0 (10.4)	−18.5 (−1.3)	−22.1 (−7.8)
Average precipitation mm (inches)	42.4 (1.67)	33.3 (1.31)	33.7 (1.33)	31.9 (1.26)	59.2 (2.33)	72.4 (2.85)	81.2 (3.20)	77.5 (3.05)	49.1 (1.93)	45.5 (1.79)	42.5 (1.67)	44.8 (1.76)	613.5 (24.15)
Average snowfall cm (inches)	20.1 (7.9)	16.9 (6.7)	9.2 (3.6)	1.7 (0.7)	0.0 (0.0)	0.0 (0.0)	0.0 (0.0)	0.0 (0.0)	0.0 (0.0)	0.5 (0.2)	6.9 (2.7)	17.4 (6.9)	72.6 (28.6)
Average precipitation days (≥ 1.0 mm)	11.1	8.3	8.1	6.8	9.3	9.9	10.6	9.2	8.2	8.9	9.3	10.6	110.2
Average relative humidity (%)	84.0	78.2	72.1	63.6	65.3	66.3	65.5	66.4	73.1	80.2	86.0	86.1	73.9
Mean monthly sunshine hours	36.4	65.7	110.3	174.5	212.3	213.6	224.2	215.9	146.8	88.1	38.8	30.1	1,556.6
Source 1: NOAA
Source 2: Czech Hydrometeorological Institute

== History ==
=== 10th–15th centuries ===
The first verified written mention is in the charter of the chapter at the Church of St. Stephen in Litoměřice, dated to 1056 or 1057. In 1249, it was first mentioned with the title of royal town. The charter of the Prague Benedictine monastery from 993 was considered to be the first written mention of Ústí nad Labem, but its legitimacy has been called into question.

In the second half of the 13th century, King Ottokar II invited German settlers into the country and granted them a German form of municipal incorporation, thereby founding the city proper. In 1423, as King of Bohemia, Sigismund pledged the city to Elector Frederick I of Meissen, who occupied it with a Saxon garrison. On 16 June 1426, after the city was besieged by the 25,000 Hussites, the besiegers defeat a German army of 70,000 troops was sent to its relief but the Hussites defeated the Germans amid great slaughter. The next day, the Hussites stormed and razed the city. It was left derelict for three years before rebuilding began in 1429.

=== 16th–19th centuries ===
The city was again burned down in 1583 and was sacked by the Swedes in 1639 amid the Thirty Years' War. It also suffered grievously during the Seven Years' War and was near the 1813 Battle of Kulm between France and the alliance of Austria, Prussia, and Russia during the Napoleonic Wars. As late as 1830, its population was only 1,400.

As part of the Kingdom of Bohemia, it was eventually incorporated into the Habsburg monarchy and heavily industrialised over the 19th century. After the Compromise of 1867, it headed the Aussig District, one of Austrian Bohemia's 94 district commissions (Bezirkshauptmannschaften). In the 1870s, with only 11,000 people, it was a major producer of woolen goods, linen, paper, ships, and chemicals and carried on a large trade in grain, fruit, mineral water, lumber, and coal. By 1900, large-scale immigration had boosted the population to nearly 40,000, mostly German, and added glass and stone to its trades. The local river port became the busiest in the entire Austria-Hungary, surpassing even the seaport in Trieste.

=== 20th century ===
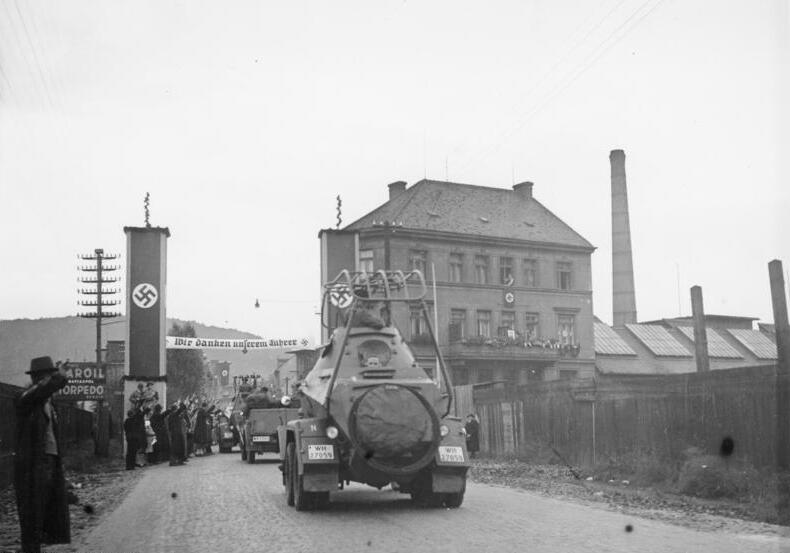
German annexation, October 1938

The factories of Aussig were an early centre of the Nazi movement. The German Workers' Party in Austria (Deutsche Arbeiterpartei in Österreich) was founded on 15 November 1903 and later gave rise to the Sudeten German Party and Austrian National Socialism. Their books continued to be printed in Ústí nad Labem even after the formation of Czechoslovakia in 1918.

During the 1930 census, Ústí nad Labem was home to 43,793 residents: 32,878 considered German, 8,735 Czech or Slovak, 222 Jews, 16 Russians, and 11 Hungarians.

Ústí nad Labem was ceded to Nazi Germany in October 1938 under the terms of the Munich Agreement and administered as part of the Reichsgau Sudetenland. In April 1945, the city was severely bombed by the United States Air Force. The bombing killed about 600 people and destroyed the historic centre of the city. Along with Plzeň, Ústí nad Labem became the most damaged Czech city during World War II. After World War II, the city was restored to Czechoslovakia and the German-speaking population was expelled.

==== Ústí massacre ====
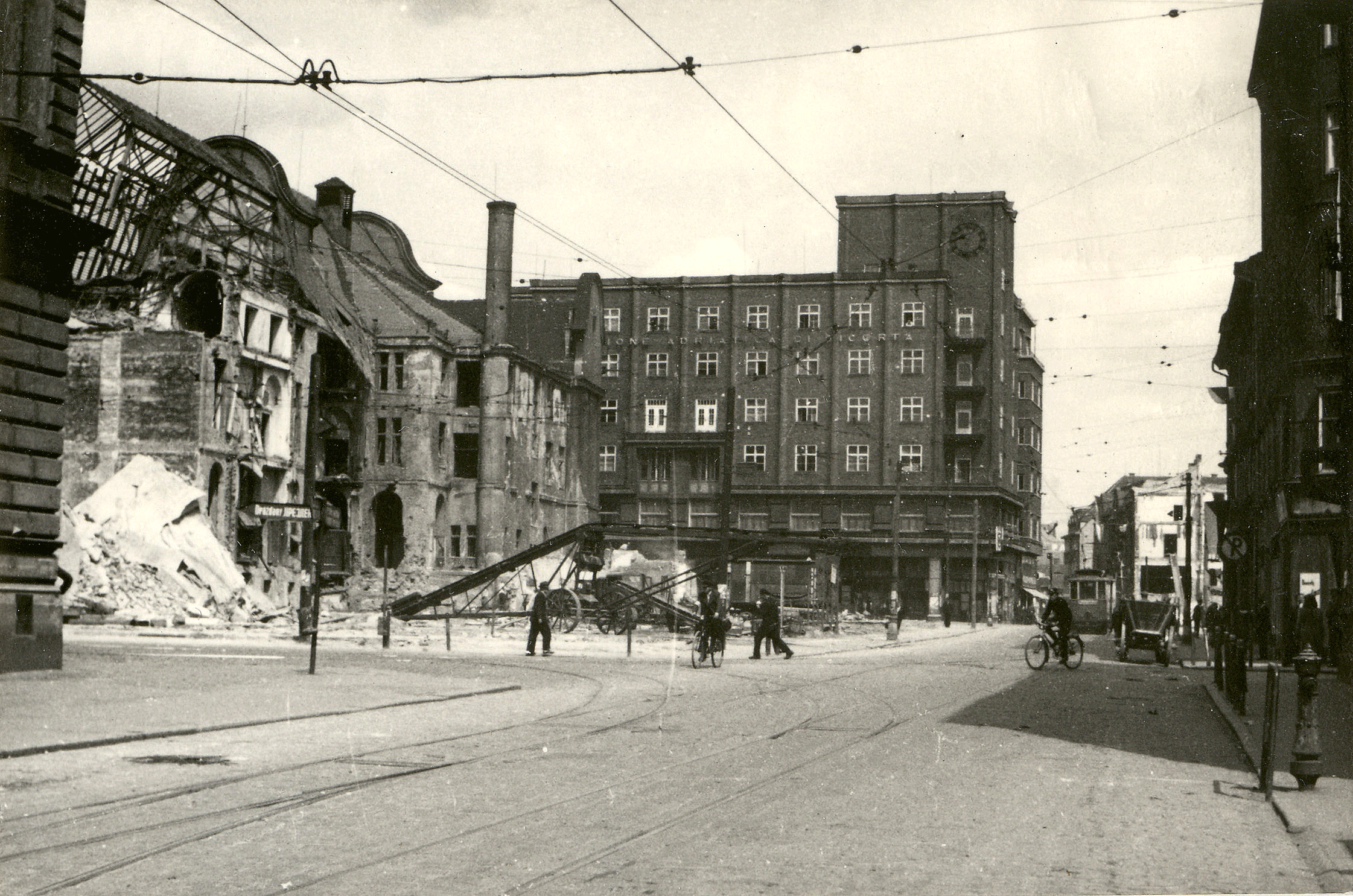
Bomb damage, 1945

Shortly after the war ended, on 31 July 1945, an explosion of the local ammunition depot triggered a pogrom against ethnic Germans, known as the Ústí massacre, mostly at the hands of Czech paramilitary groups. Whilst the official government investigation attributed the explosion to Nazi Werwolves (German saboteurs), contemporary historians have questioned the attribution as several other equally probable possibilities have been proposed. The pogrom was used as part of the justification of the Potsdam Conference to deport German citizens from Czechoslovakia, as continued cohabitation was argued to be impossible. Between 80 and 100 deaths are estimated to have resulted from the pogrom, almost double the 43 confirmed cases.

==== After World War II ====
In May 1948, the Communist government passed a new constitution declaring a people's republic.

Beginning in the 1960s dissidence and general unhappiness with communist rule gave way to new artistic pursuits tackling the country's issues, Ústí nad Labem was primarily representative of this with Kladivadlo, a theatre which moved to Ústí nad Labem after it ran into issues with support from organisers, and Dialog a monthly political magazine.

The city gained notoriety in 1999, when the Matiční Street Wall was built to separate Matiční Street with mainly Romani population from other residents, which turned into an international scandal. The wall was torn down after six weeks of its existence.

== Demographics ==
Historical population

Year	Pop.	±%
1869	20,284	—
1880	27,834	+37.2%
1890	40,796	+46.6%
1900	57,330	+40.5%
1910	68,313	+19.2%

Year	Pop.	±%
1921	71,659	+4.9%
1930	79,644	+11.1%
1950	64,179	−19.4%
1961	72,148	+12.4%
1970	79,544	+10.3%

Year	Pop.	±%
1980	89,272	+12.2%
1991	98,178	+10.0%
2001	95,436	−2.8%
2011	93,000	−2.6%
2021	89,713	−3.5%

Source: Censuses

== Economy ==
Ústí nad Labem is the economic centre of the Ústí nad Labem Region and the seat of many industrial companies. The largest industrial employers with its headquarters in Ústí nad Labem and at least 500 employees are Spolek pro chemickou a hutní výrobu (chemical industry) and Strabag Rail (construction industry). Other large industrial companies in the city include Kone Industrial (manufacture of elevators), Severotisk (printing industry) and Pierburg (manufacture of car parts).

== Transport ==
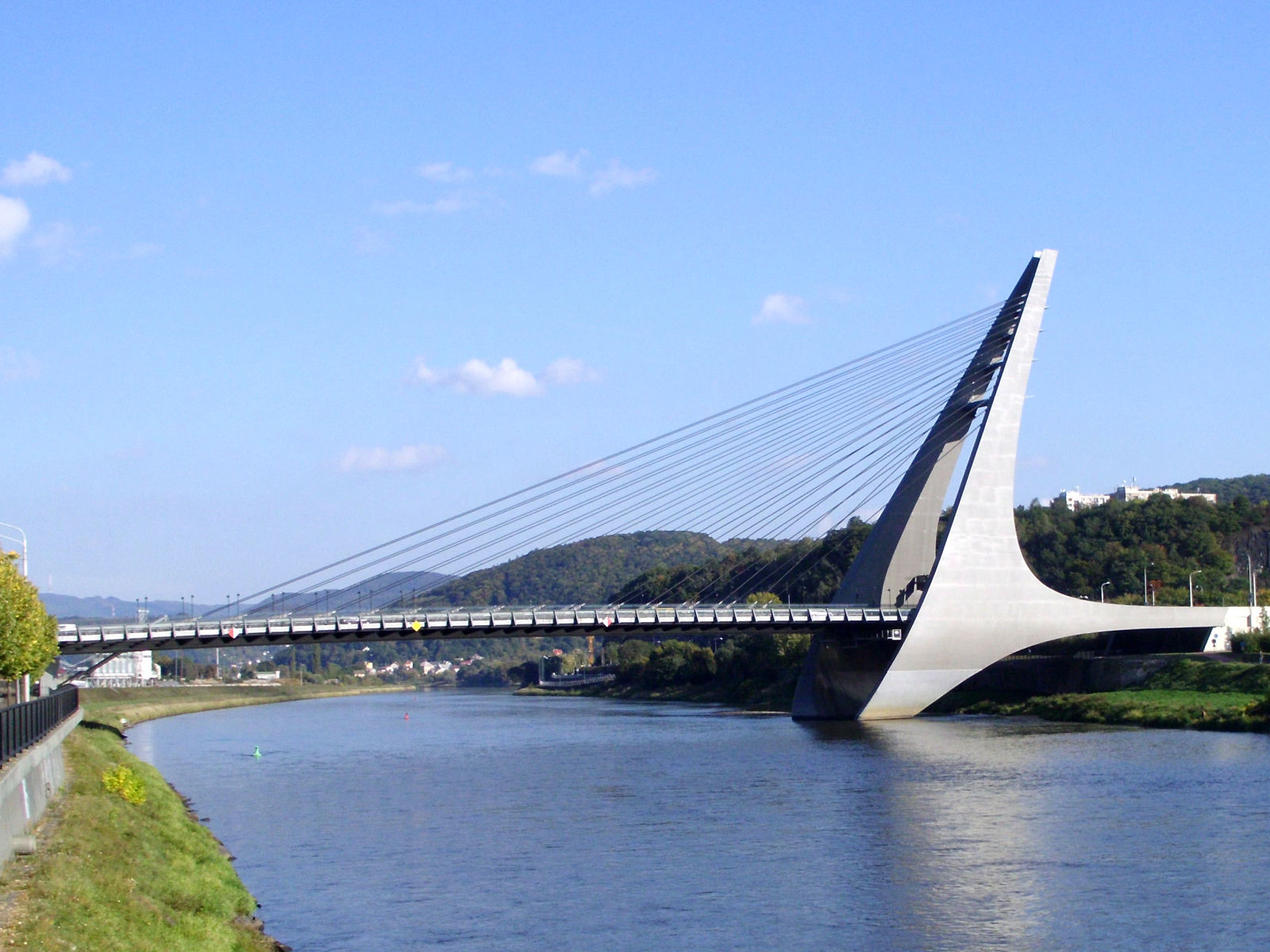
The bridge Mariánský most

=== Road transport ===
The D8 motorway (part of the European route E55) from Prague to Dresden intersects the western border of Ústí nad Labem. The European route E442 from Liberec to Karlovy Vary, formed by first class road, also passes through the city.

The bridge Mariánský most is a road bridge over the Elbe which was built over a period of five years and opened in 1998. It is one of the main landmarks of the city. International Association for Bridge and Structural Engineering ranked Mariánský most among the 10 best structures of the world in the decade.

=== City mass transport ===
The city has a network of mass transport that includes bus and trolley bus lines. The city has its own transport company, Dopravní podnik města Ústí nad Labem.

=== Railway transport ===
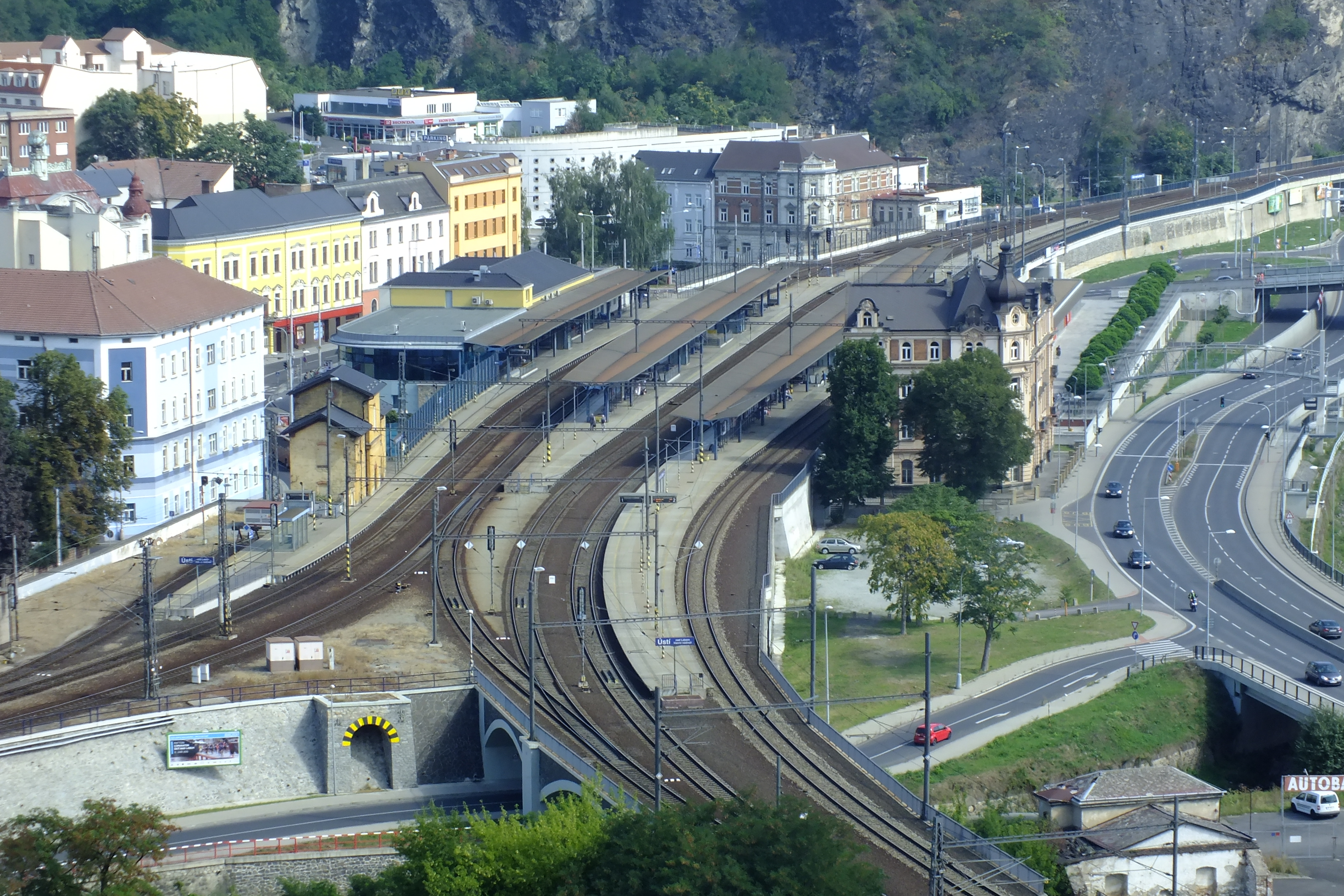
Main railway station

Ústí nad Labem is an important railway node with four railway stations. The largest of these is Ústí nad Labem main railway station which is served by international EuroCity trains. Ústí nad Labem lies on the line from Prague to Děčín, which is part of several international lines, and thus the city has direct connections with Berlin, Budapest, Graz and Zurich. Lines of national importance are Prague–Cheb and Ústí nad Labem – Kolín.

=== River transport ===
The Elbe River Line is a junction with the West-European river lines opening access to Germany, Benelux countries, northern France and to important sea ports. Freight transportation and pleasure cruises are run on the water line section Pardubice–Chvaletice–Ústí nad Labem–Hřensko–Hamburg.

=== Air transport ===
An airport for small sports planes (ICAO code LKUL) is located northwest of the city. The nearest public international airports are Václav Havel Airport Prague (64 km) and Dresden Airport in Germany (56 km).

== Education ==
The city is home of the Jan Evangelista Purkyně University in Ústí nad Labem. This public university has about 8,500 students and with about 900 employees, it is one of the most important employers in the region.

== Sport ==
The local ice hockey club HC Slovan Ústečtí Lvi. The football club is FK Viagem Ústí nad Labem, which plays at the Městský stadion.

The city hosts the Ústí nad Labem Half Marathon, one of the World Athletics Label Road Races.

During the 1950s and 1960s, the motorcycle speedway team AMK Ústí nad Labem raced in the city. It raced initially at a stadium in the Bukov area until it was converted into an athletics facility in 1960. Then the team raced at a track in the Klíše area from 1967 to 1968 and finally in Polepy. The team raced in the inaugural 1956 Czechoslovak Championship and won two silver medals and three bronze medals from 1961 to 1971.

== Sights ==
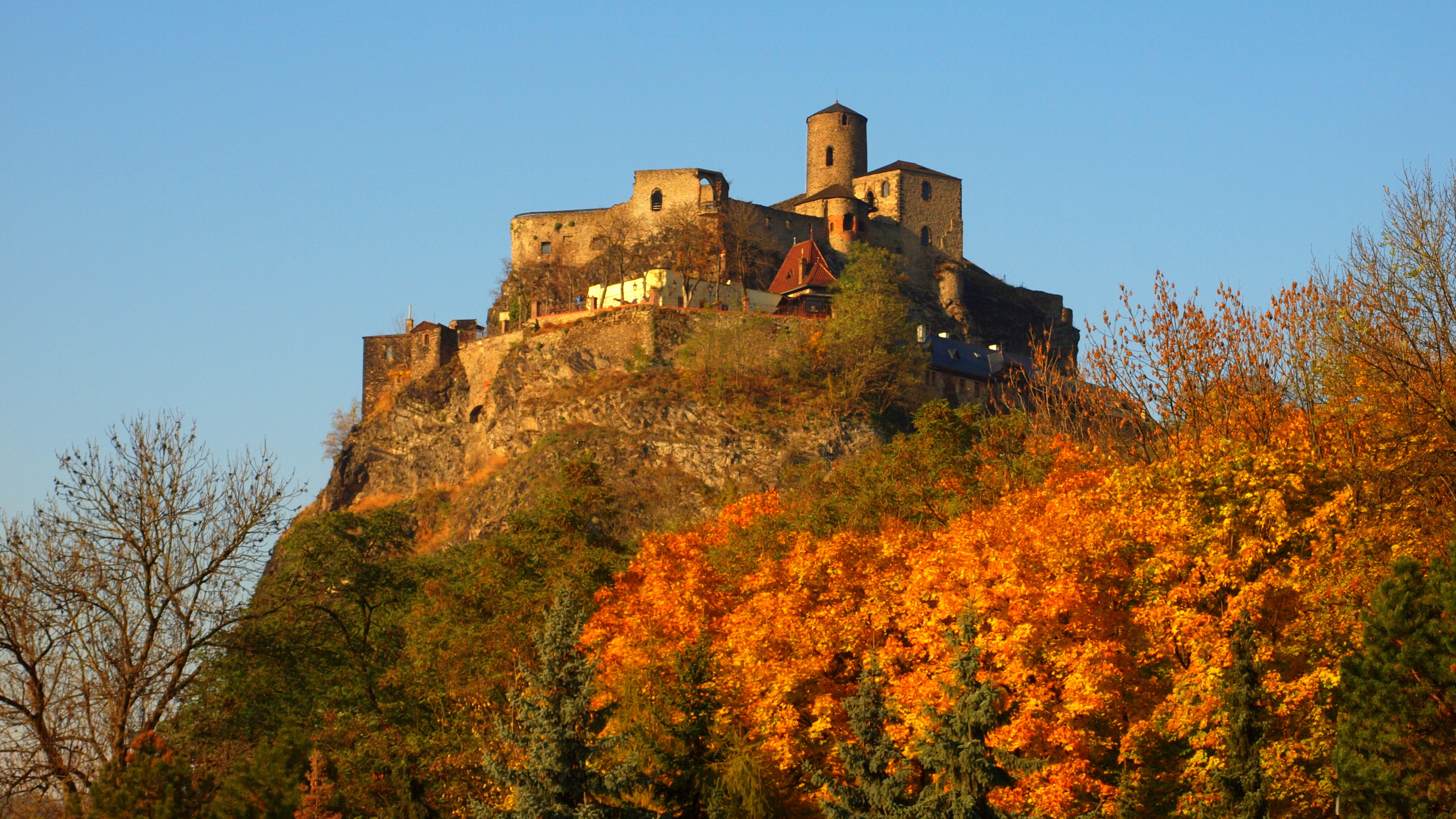
Střekov Castle

The Střekov Castle is one of the main sights of Ústí nad Labem, and one of the most visited tourist destinations in the whole region. It is located in a southern suburb of the city. The castle was built in 1316–1319. With a break in 1945–1992, it has been owned by the Lobkowicz family since 1563.

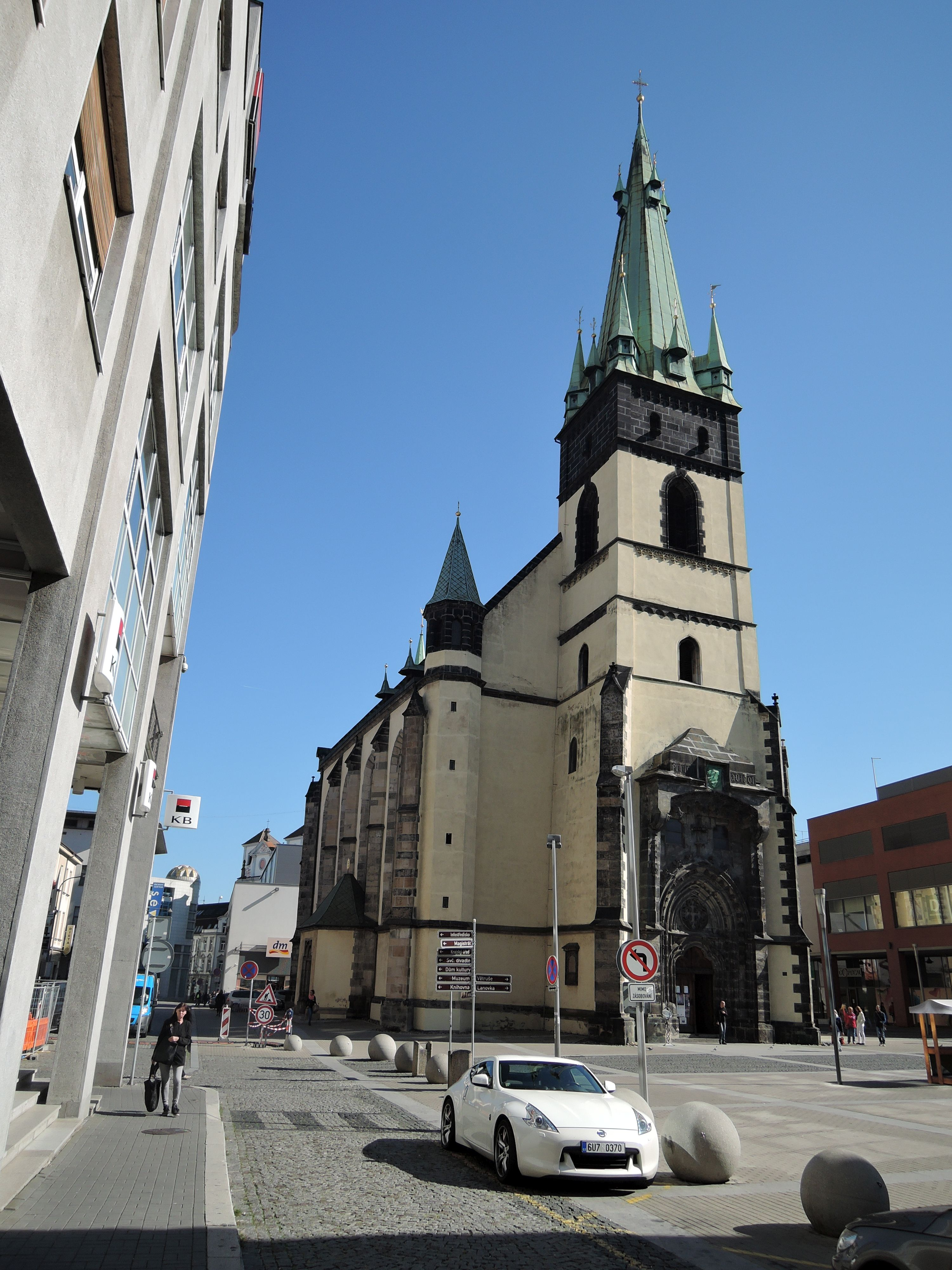
Church of the Assumption of the Virgin Mary with leaning tower

The Church of the Assumption of the Virgin Mary was built in 1318 and is located in the city centre. It is well known for its leaning tower. The tower is 65 metres (213 ft) high and its deviation, caused by bombing at the end of World War II, is 201 centimetres (6.59 ft). It is the most leaning tower north of the Alps.

A significant landmark is the hill Větruše with an observation tower and the Větruše Castle, which was built in 1847 as a hotel and restaurant serving cultural and social purposes.

In Krásné Březno part is located the Ústí nad Labem Zoo, founded in 1908. A notable building is the Krásné Březno Castle. It is formed by the Old Castle, built before 1568, and by the New Castle, built in the early 17th century and modified in the Baroque style in the first half of the 18th century. The castle is surrounded by an English park. Nowadays the castle serves as the seat of the branch of National Heritage Institute of the Czech Republic.

== Notable people ==
- Anton Raphael Mengs (1728–1779), German painter
- Mimi Wagensonner (1897–1970), Austrian composer
- Johanna Döbereiner (1924–2000), Brazilian agronomist
- Felix Weinberg (1928–2012), Czech-British physicist
- Günther Herbig (born 1931), German conductor
- Alfred Lipka (1931–2010), German violist
- Vladimír Páral (1932–2026), writer
- Heinz Edelmann (1934–2009), Czech-German illustrator and designer
- Milan Hejduk (born 1976), ice hockey player
- Jiří Jarošík (born 1977), footballer
- Petra Gelbart (born 1978), musicologist, musician, music therapist and human rights defender
- Jan Mertl (born 1982), tennis coach and player
- Tomáš Černý (born 1985), footballer
- Michal Neuvirth (born 1988), ice hockey player

== Twin towns – sister cities ==
Ústí nad Labem is twinned with:

- Chemnitz, Germany
- Halton, England, United Kingdom

Ústí nad Labem also cooperates with Dresden, Germany.

== Gallery ==
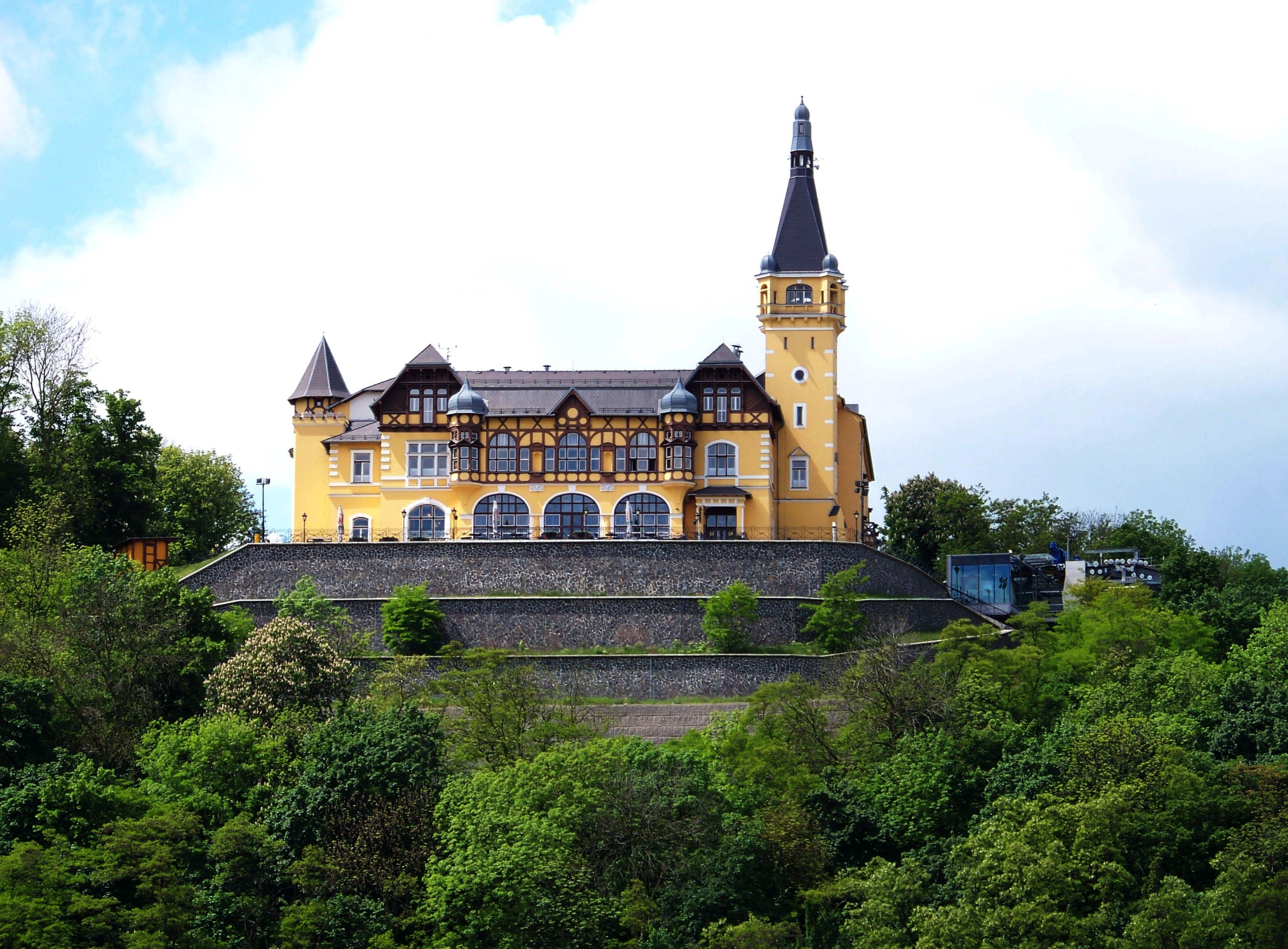
Větruše Castle

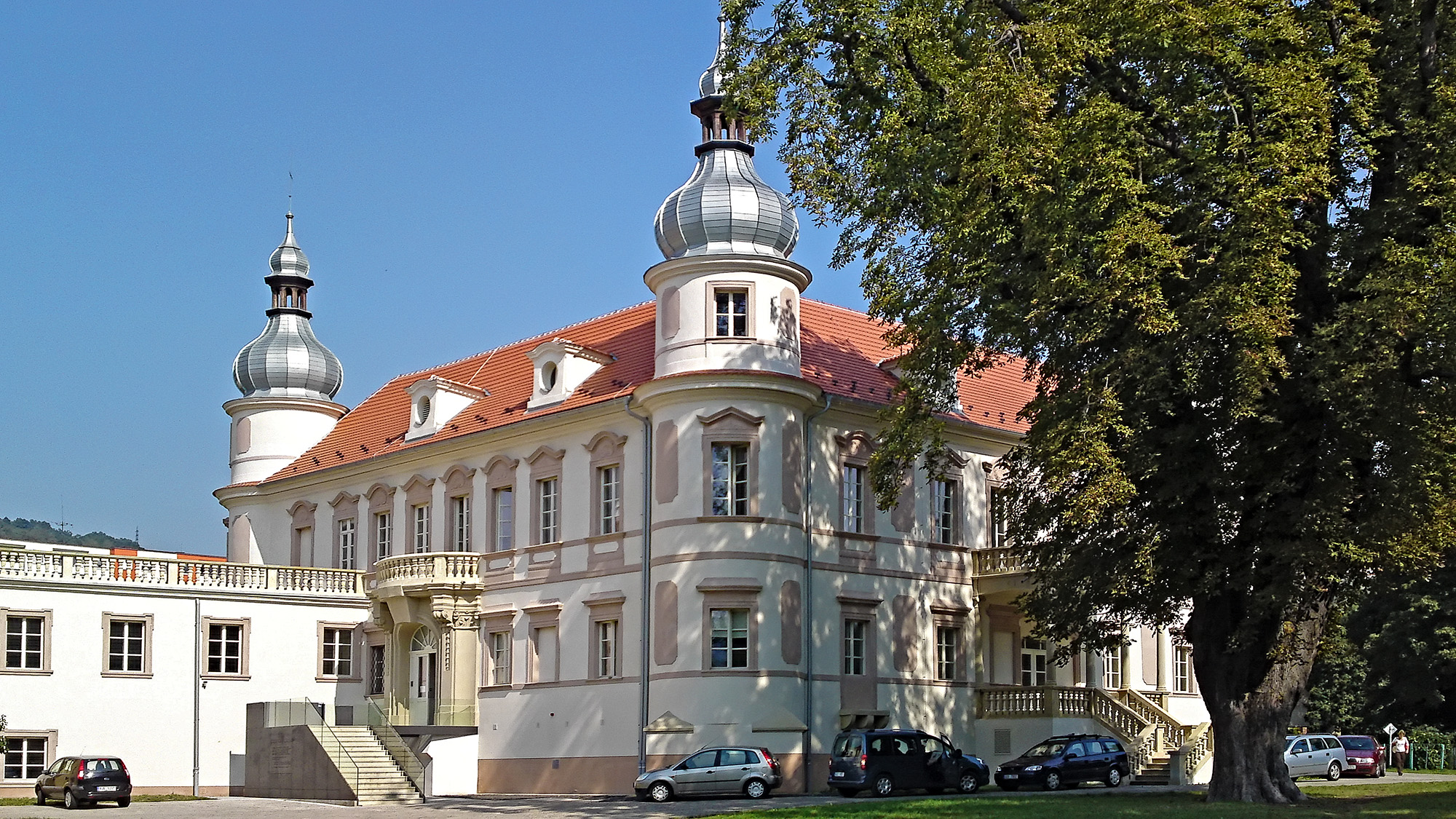
Krásné Březno Castle

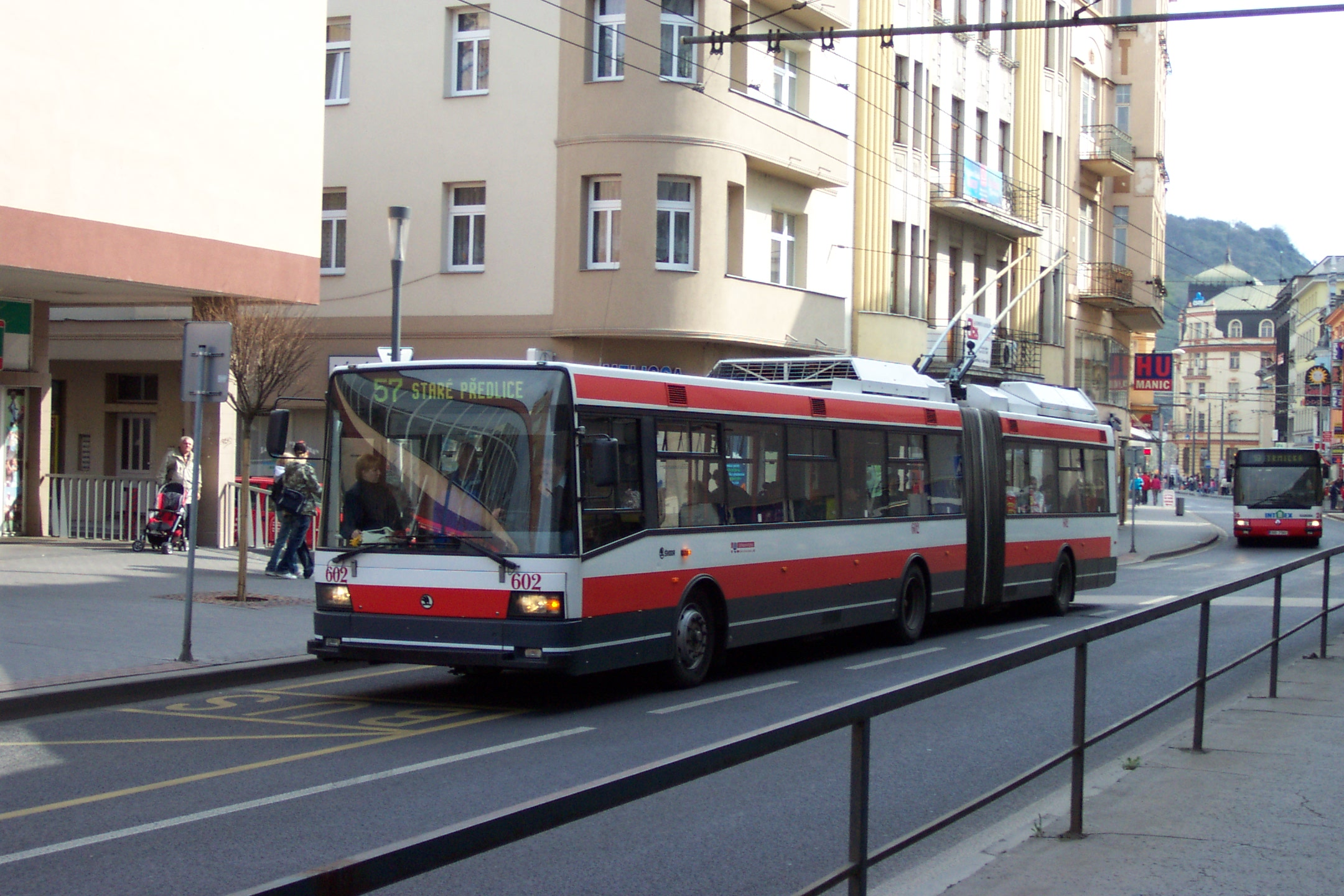
Municipal trolleybus

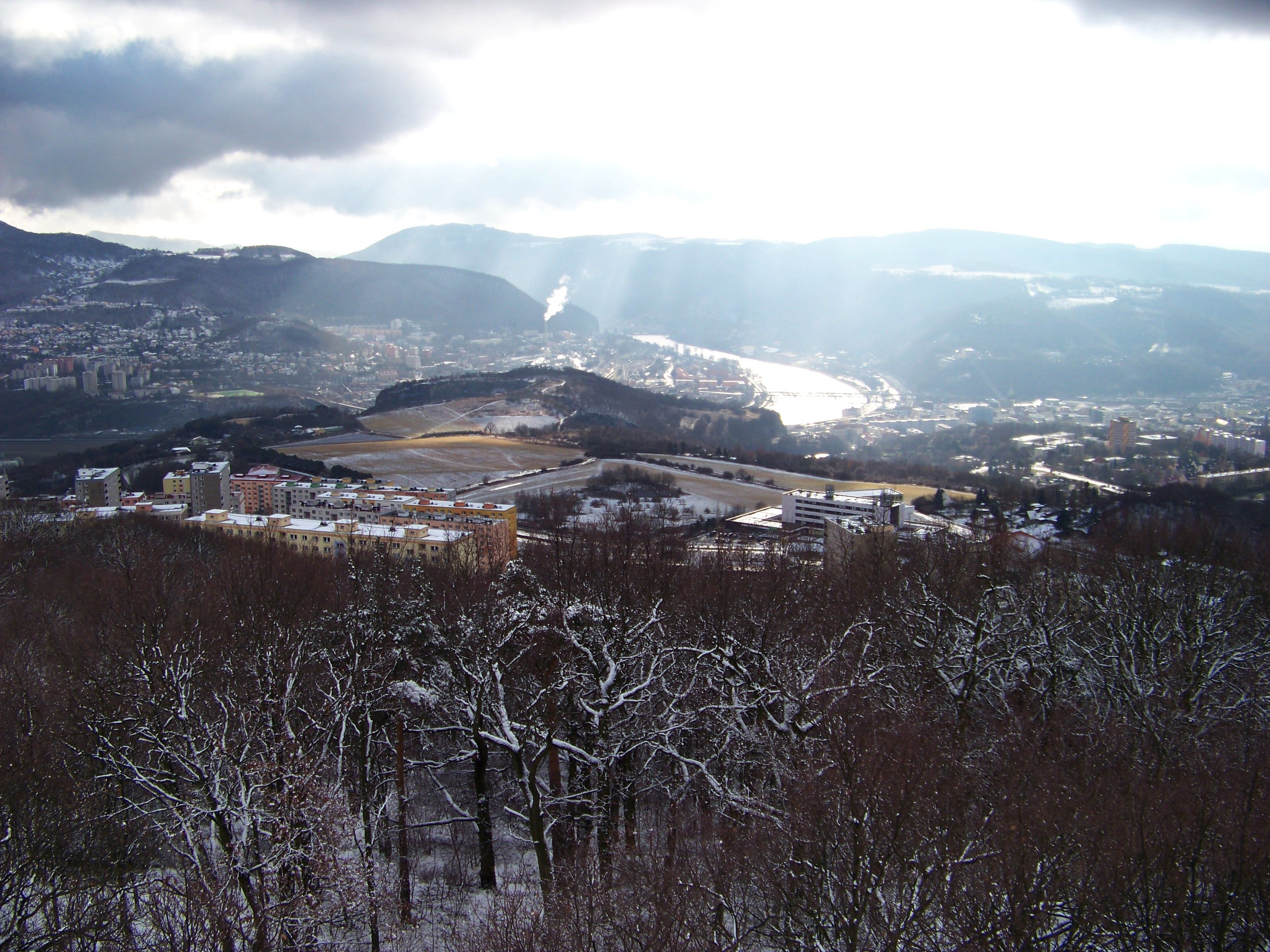
Panorama from a nearby observation tower

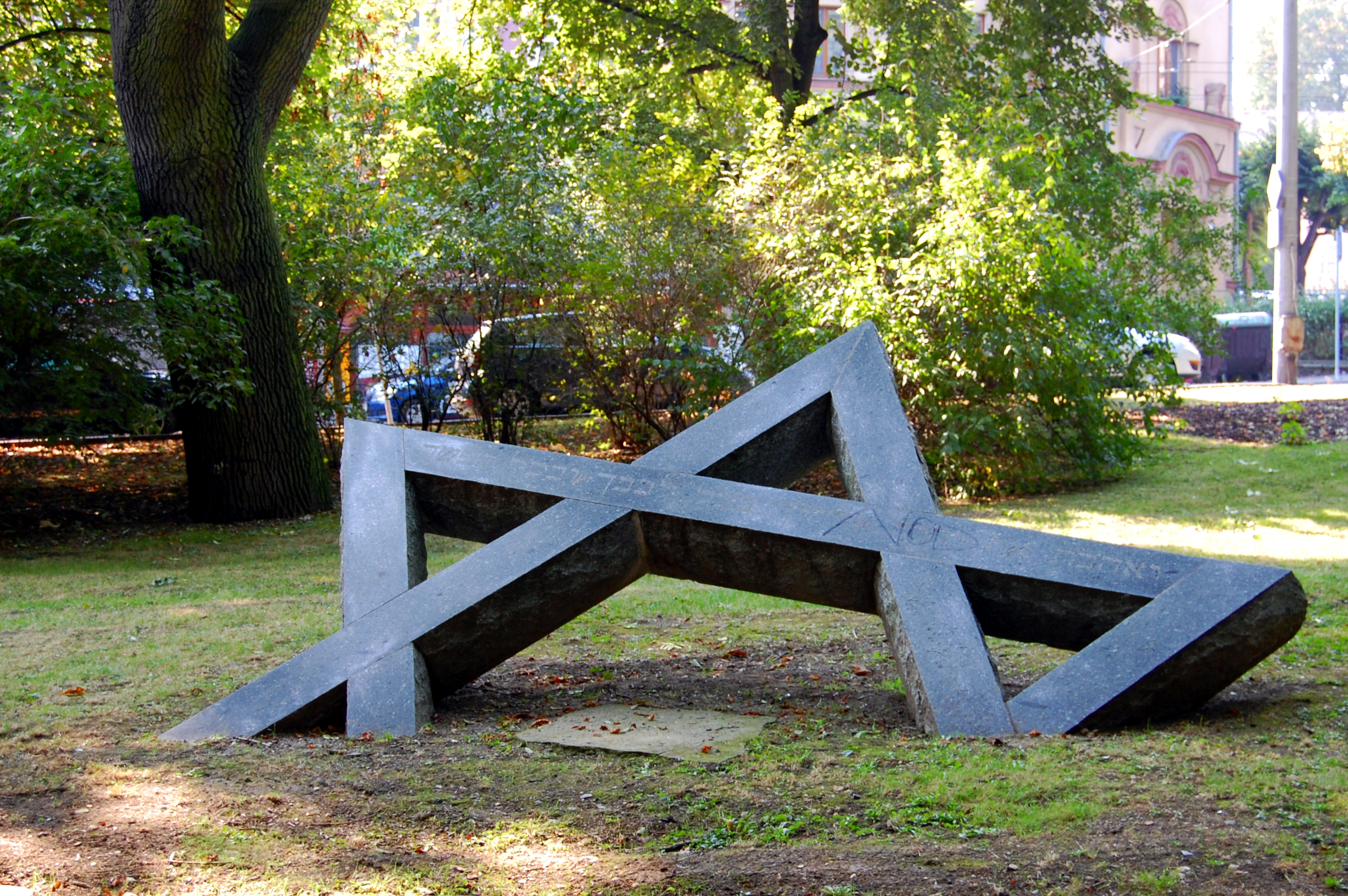
Holocaust memorial built in 2005
