= Michal Vitanovský =

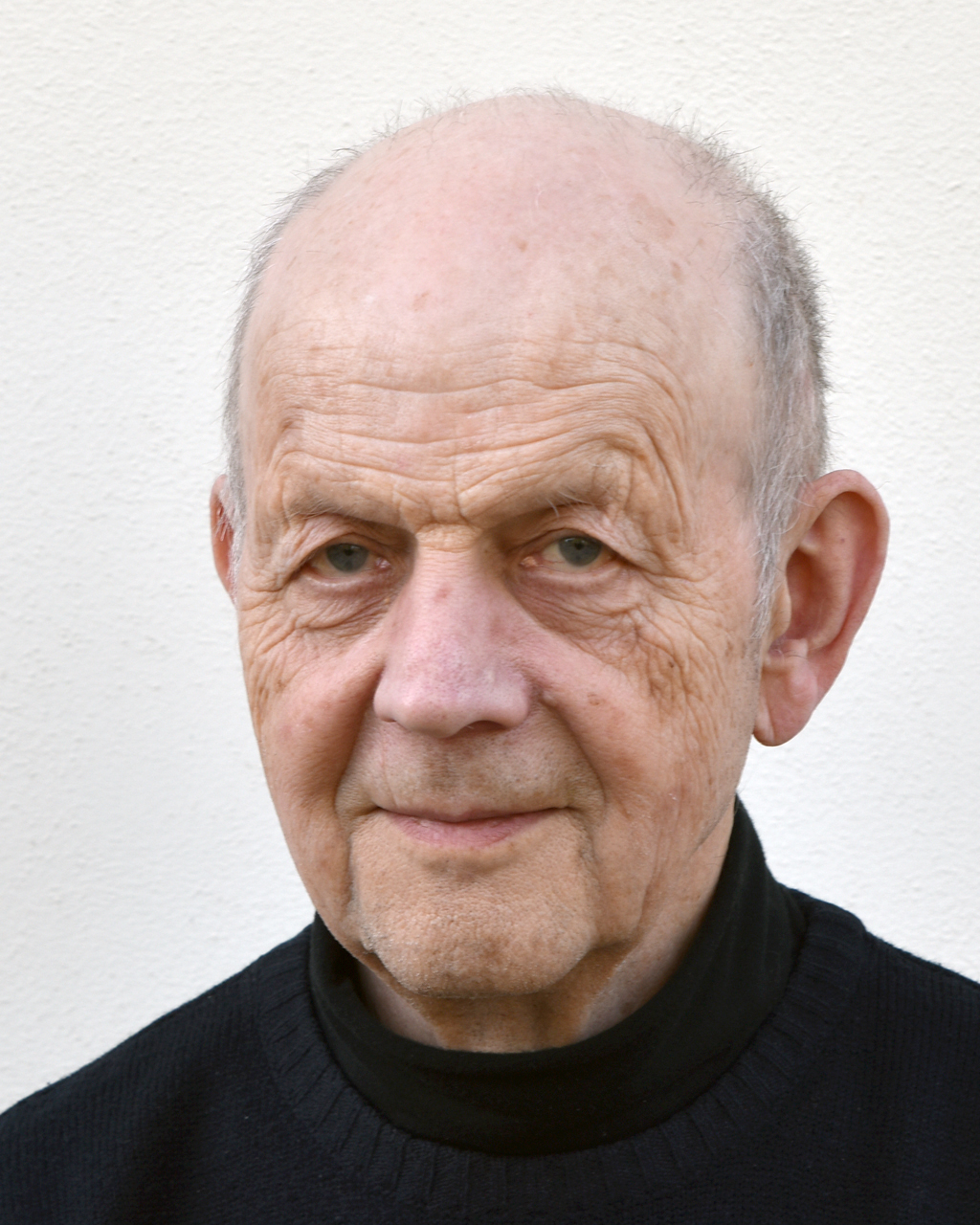
- Vitanovský in 2026
- Born: 3 May 1946 (age 80); Klatovy, Czechoslovakia
- Education: Academy of Arts, Architecture and Design in Prague
- Known for: sculptor, medal artist, expert journalist, art historian
- Notable work: Order of Tomáš Garrigue Masaryk, Order of the White Lion
- Spouse: Naděžda Vitanovská
- Awards: Order of Saint Lazarus, Crux ex Merito

Michal Vitanovský (born 3 May 1946) is Czech medal artist and sculptor. He is the author of expert articles and books on medal art, numismatics, heraldry and history of decorative stove tiles.

== Life ==
Vitanovský was born on 3 May 1946 in Klatovy. He comes from a family of a soldier in the Czechoslovak Army. His father was resistance fighter during World War II and a high school teacher, later an army officer who was forced into early retirement at the start of normalization. Michal lived with his family successively in Mikulov, Brno, Prague, Trenčín, and finally in Prague. In his youth, he read the works of Gustav Meyrink, Lautréamont, and Jarry; during his teenage years, he discovered rock and roll and the Beatles. When he initially failed the entrance exams for art school, he completed the optional ninth grade and attended art courses at the People's School for a year.

From 1961 to 1965, he attended the Secondary School of Fine Arts in Prague. A profound influence on him had his art teacher Professor Viktorin, who required students to tackle a new subject each week. After graduating, he studied from 1965 to 1971 at the Academy of Arts, Architecture and Design in Prague in the studio of Jan Kavan, majoring in applied sculpture. During his studies, he took evening courses in figure drawing and visited exhibitions of leading artists of the Czech modernist movement of the 1960s. He also had the opportunity to get acquainted with the works of European sculptors Lipchitz, Moore, Calder, Arp, and Picasso. In 1974, he participated in the exhibition "The Contemporary Bohemian Medal" in Prague, and a year later, in the FIDEM international exhibition in Kraków. In 1976, together with other Czech artists (Demartini, Nešleha, Hendrych, Kolíbal, Dlouhý, Karel, Roubíček, and others), he participated in a major commission by the Art Center for the Marble Palace of the Pahlavi dynasty in Tehran.

Since the 1980s, he regularly attended medal-making symposia in Nyíregyháza, Kremnica, and Uherské Hradiště. There, he gained experience with lost-wax casting, a technique in which each work is created as a unique original piece (Loneliness, Studio, 1984). In 1986, his sculpture Icarus was installed at the Faculty of Education in Ústí nad Labem, and in 1988, the Monument to the Peasant revolt of 1775 in Bohemia was installed at Konopiště Castle. Through this work, Vitanovský aligns himself with the Baroque tradition, yet it is a modern work sculpted in sandstone. Toward the end of the years of normalization, sculpting also served as a form of spiritual catharsis for him and a reaction to the regime's efforts of brainwashing (Metamorphosis, 1987).

After the Velvet Revolution in 1989, opportunities opened up for the free creation of works on previously forbidden themes. Commissions began pouring in from cities, churches, government institutions, foundations, and even some cultured private individuals, and it suddenly became possible to mint and issue the works in larger series. Some commissions in the 1990s were entirely unique. Vitanovský won the competition for the Order of Tomáš Garrigue Masaryk (1991) and for the Czech Republic's highest state honor, the Order of the White Lion (1994).

Since 1984, he has been publishing expert articles focusing on medal art, coins, medieval tiles, and heraldry. In 1989, he was a member of the action committee of the Civic Forum at Mánes. Since 1990, he has been a member of the Association of Medal Artists (elected chairman at the founding meeting in 1990), and since 1992, a member of the Umělecká beseda (chairman of the fine arts department in 1993). In the 1990s, he contributed to the magazine The Medal published in London, edited the Information Bulletin of the Medal Artists' Association, and contributed to the Umělecká beseda bulletin Život (Life) (2004–2007). He was a member of the informal association ‘'Lipany’' (1991–1992). Together with Milada Othová and Jiří Vlach, they form the art group Trojkolka (The tricycle). The group organizes regular meetings and art symposia.

Vitanovský lives and works in Prague and in Pyšely. He is one of the leading Czech medal artists. To mark his 60th birthday, two retrospective exhibitions of his sculptures and medals were held in 2006 at the Senate of the Czech Republic and at Strahov Monastery. Abroad, he has been represented at exhibitions organized by FIDEM ("Fédération internationale de la médaille d'art") since 1975 (Lisbon, Florence, Stockholm, Colorado Springs, Helsinki, London, Budapest, The Hague, etc.)

In the 1970s, he married Eliška Zázvůrková (born 1955), a dancer at the National Theatre, with whom he has a daughter, Barbora (born 1977). The couple divorced and Eliška Vitanovská moved to United States. He met his second wife, Naděžda, at a medal-making symposium in Kremnica in 1985.

=== Awards received ===
- 1995 Medaille d'argent de L'Ordine pro merito melitensi. Order of Merit of Malta - Sovereign Order of the Knights of Malta
- 2000 "Jiří of Poděbrady Medal." Jiří of Poděbrady Foundation for European Cooperation
- 2006 The "Tomáš J. Baťa Award" for Distinguished Service, Rotary International
- 2015 Officier de Merité, Officers' Cross of Merit. Military and Hospitaller Order of St. Lazarus of Jerusalem
- 2016 "The Josef Hlávka Medal." The Josef, Marie, and Zdeňka Hlávka Foundation
- 2023 Crux ex Merito (The Cross of Merit of the Holy Sepulcher in Jerusalem), Order of the Holy Sepulchre

== Work ==
Vitanovský is an example of educated, creative individual with a broad knowledge of art spanning from the Middle Ages to the present day. His intellectual focus leads him toward an expressive sculptural style. Throughout his body of work, there is a clear balance between an intimately lyrical element and elements that are both dramatic and rational. His original work is often non-figurative and draws on other 20th-century art movements. He is an artist who has had a profound influence on the development of Czech medal art since the late 1970s and early 1980s.

He considers himself primarily a sculptor, but he is best known for his extensive body of work as a medalist, which consists mainly of portraits. While still a student in 1968, he cast his first medal featuring a portrait of Albert Einstein and designed a medal of T. G. Masaryk, which was minted in 1968. In the late 1960s, he participated in competitions for commemorative coins (Jan Evangelista Purkyně, 1969), but with a few exceptions from the 1970s (Jesenský, Smetana, S. K. Neumann), he only began designing coins after the fall of communism in the 1990s. His sculptural work is highly expressive (Pieta—Study for a Monument to the Peasant Rebels, 1978).

At the Academy of Arts, Architecture and Design in Prague he experimented with all kinds of sculptural materials, from wood, metals, ceramics, and stone to plastics. It was during this period that he created his small bronze sculptures, which, with their monumental forms, resemble studies for larger works. Toward the end of his studies and shortly after graduation, he focused on white-glazed ceramics, highlighting the details of his modeling with blue glaze. He created a series of sculptures inspired by the female figure, along with numerous variations on "Idols," rendered in the style of synthetic cubism (Motherhood, 1973). His work shows the influence of many modern sculptors. Vitanovský's creative vision experiments with traditional forms and draws inspiration from the Middle Ages within the Renaissance concept of the medal.

The end of his college studies coincided with the onset of normalization, which was also reflected in his thesis project—he channeled all his feelings about the stifling atmosphere of that era into the sculpture Prometheus. The ancient hero Prometheus became a symbol of an individual's bold defiance against the Warsaw Pact invasion of Czechoslovakia, just as the act of Jan Palach did. Other sculptures from that period, even in their titles, clearly reflect the oppression of the times (The Imprisoned Bird).

After graduating from art academy, Vitanovský devoted himself primarily to creating medals and sculptures as a freelance artist. Like most artists affected by the occupation in August 1968 and the subsequent normalization, he turned to neutral themes (in his case, figures from ancient Czech history), which were tolerated by the regime. He conveyed his experiences from reading Czech and European poets and writers into a series of unconventional and distinctive medals titled Poets and Writers. He also dedicated series of medals to issues raised by the rapid development of civilization (with the ironic title In Praise of Civilization) and the associated destructive impact of humans on nature or the threat of war. Cast medals and plaques were not subject to such strict scrutiny by communist censors and offered the possibility of greater artistic freedom as well as the opportunity to exhibit abroad. This was not the case, however, for minted medals, where oversight of content did not end until the fall of the communist regime in 1989. Consequently, minted medals did not become a significant part of Vitanovský's body of work until after 1990.

In addition to medals commemorating specific events in his personal life (Wedding, 1975; Birth of a Daughter, 1977; Barborka, 1979), he also created works marking significant anniversaries (Lidice, 1971–1972; Year of Czech Music, 1974, National Theatre, 1981–1982). The Lidice medal approaches the theme in a completely new and original way — the surface, with the "shadows" of figures suggested, is perforated by three bullet holes, from which cracks radiate outward. Vitanovský typically creates works in separate thematic cycles. His very first series of seven medals from 1975 commemorates the Prague Uprising of May 1945 in an unconventional way. In the 1970s, he created a series of medals and plaques with environmental themes, which became a symbolic expression of his dissent against the political situation in occupied Czechoslovakia (Without Water, There Is No Life, 1976; Bird in Oil, 1980). At the same time, he began a series of portrait medals of figures he personally admired (Vančura, Debureau, 1976, Brothers Čapek, 1977, etc.). In the 1970s, he began creating the series Murdered Poets, which bears witness to his personal commitment to the world of literature and serves as a warning to future generations. For the Marble Palace in Tehran, he created ten bronze reliefs depicting administrative reforms in government ministries.

The discovery of the tomb of Ottokar II of Bohemia and his royal regalia in 1976 served as a powerful inspiration for his work. It was then that he realized what is eternal and set himself a specific task within a limited timeframe. He decided to systematically explore the roots of Czech statehood and to devote himself to creating a gallery of important figures from Czech and European history, from the early Middle Ages to Comenius (the series Great Figures of Czech History). Vitanovský does not merely create a pantheon of portraits of notable figures; he is also a knowledgeable interpreter of their deeds. He draws on his knowledge of history and sets his portraits within characteristic period features. He makes use of the tension between the smooth surface of a modeled form and sharp contour lines, as well as the contrast between geometric and richly textured structures enhanced by light.

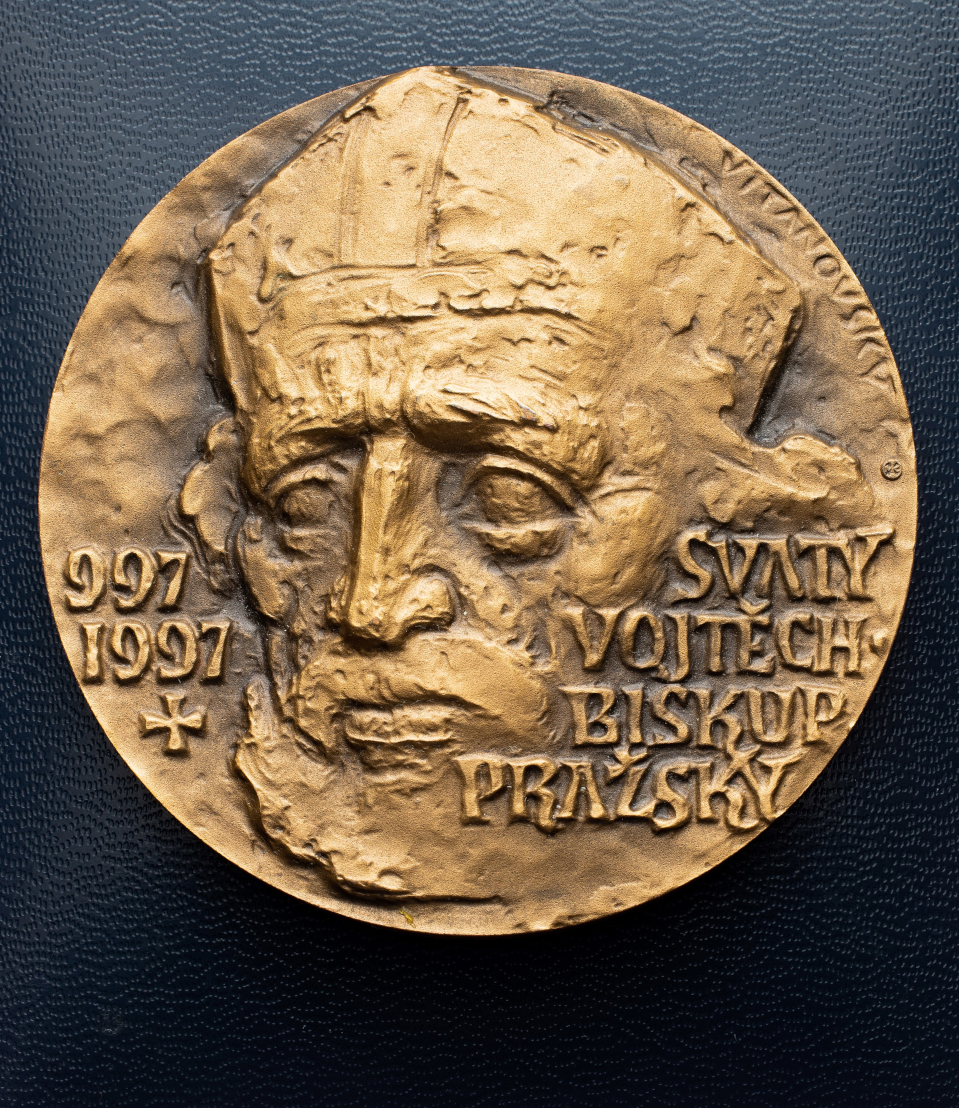
Michal Vitanovský - Adalbert of Prague, 1997

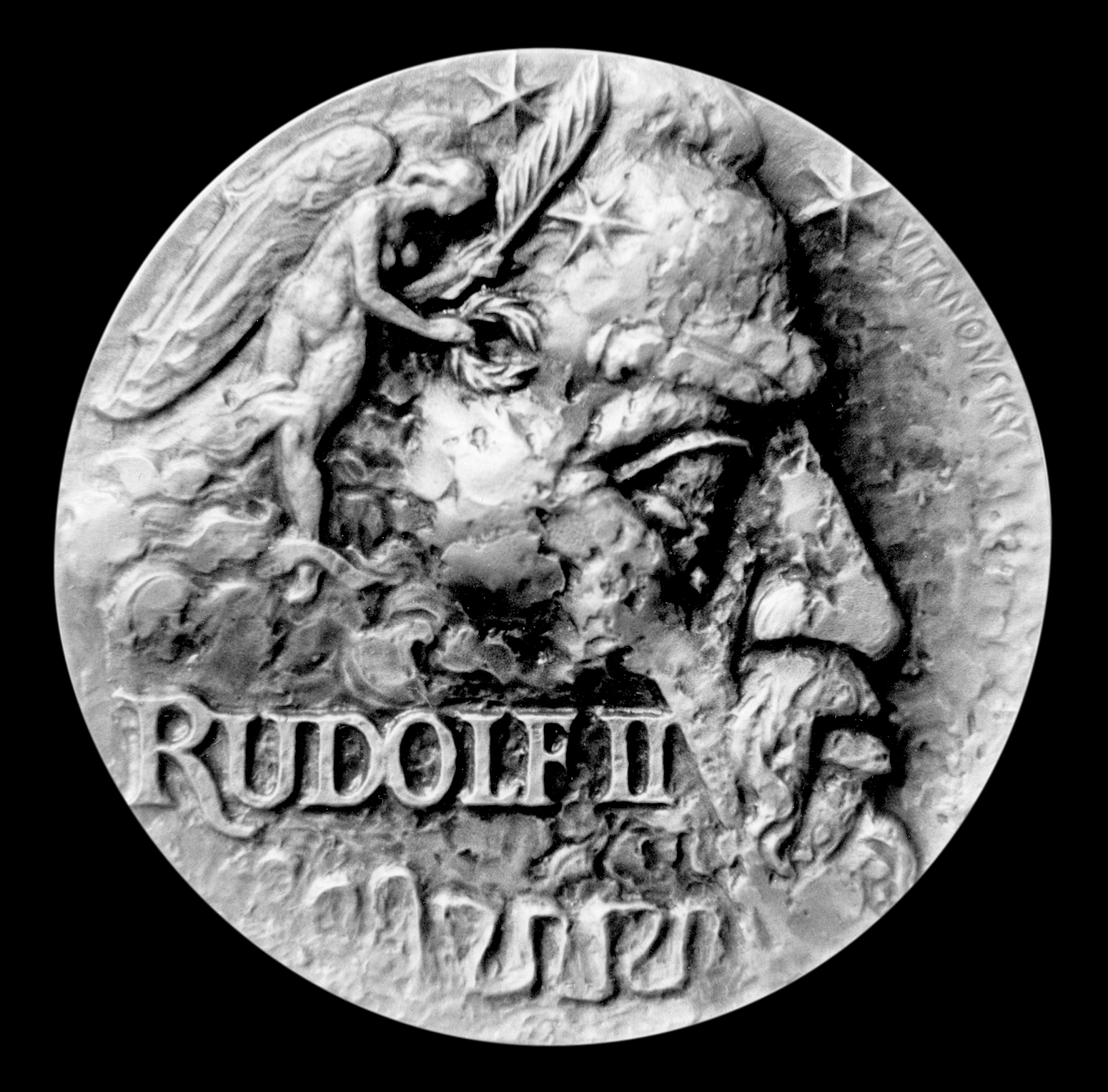
Michal Vitanovský - Rudolf II, 1998

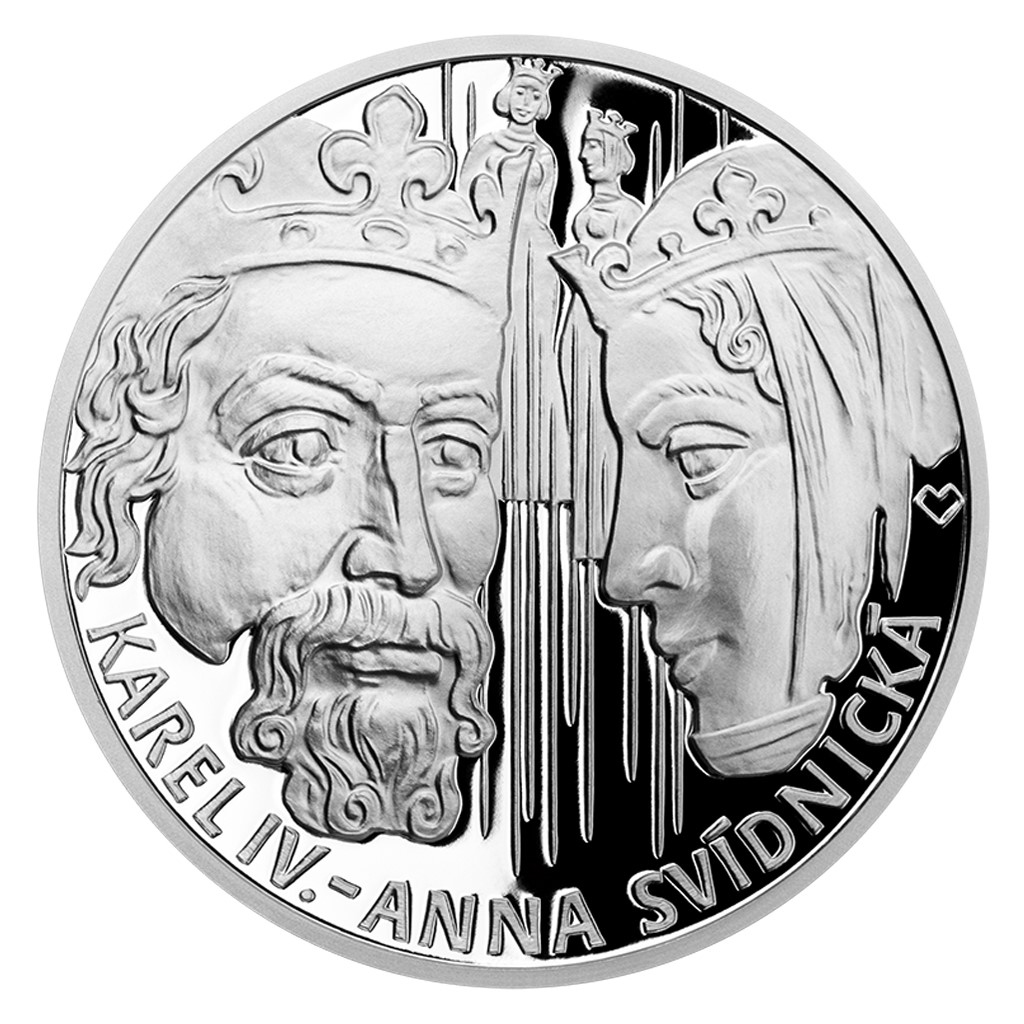
Michal Vitanovský - Charles IV and Anna von Schweidnitz, 2018

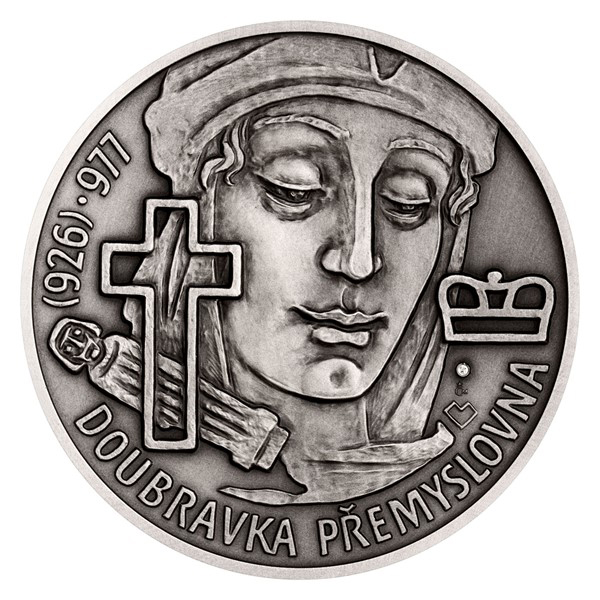
Michal Vitanovský - Doubravka of Bohemia 2021, obverse

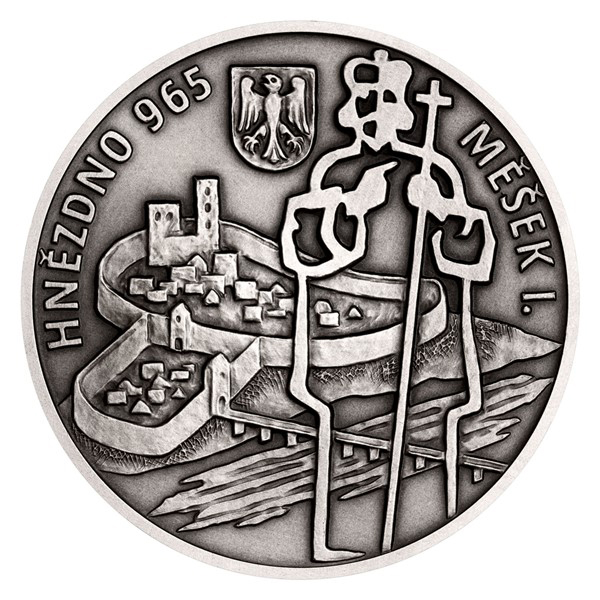
Michal Vitanovský - Doubravka of Bohemia 2021, reverse

Through their interaction with the surrounding space, some of his medals resemble rather objects and serve as a bridge between medals, plaques, and free-standing sculptures (Desire, 1978; Ariadne, 1983; Memory of the Palm). The form of his sculptures evolved from expressively exaggerated shapes, in which he allowed space to penetrate the mass through holes and crevices, bordered by numerous protruding folds, to the simplified modeling, sparsely articulated shapes, and compact forms of the late 1970s and early 1980s. In the 1980s, the poetic qualities of the sculpture gave way to an interest in constructive elements and the structural issues of the sculpture. In his series of torsos, bodily forms were transformed into simple symbols and later into architecture supported by or intertwined with a reinforced structure (Torso with a Small Wing, 1982). The deliberate and striking contrast between the smooth body and the aggressive structure is not merely a formal solution to the sculpture's tectonics; rather, as a cautionary memento, it symbolizes the clash between life and dehumanized technological civilization.

In medal art, he replaces the classic regular oval or circular shape with a new form that follows the contours of architecture or heads, working with both flat surfaces and high relief, which sometimes extends into three dimensions. He often approaches his subjects in an innovative and unconventional manner — for example, the skull on the reverse of the medal of Ottokar II of Bohemia, symbolizing vanitas. The central work in the series of historical figures is a medal depicting the first historically documented Czech ruler, Bořivoj I, wearing a hood with lion's paws, complemented by cloisonné enamel characteristic of his era, as known from archaeological finds. Other medals are dedicated to the adoption of Christianity and the stone throne, the founding of Prague Castle, the rotunda at Levý Hradec, the meeting of Bořivoj with Saint Methodius, Princess Ludmila, the patron saints of the Czech lands, and others.

The medals depicting prominent figures whose appearances are unknown (Cosmas of Prague, abbot Božetěch, Master of the Vysegrad Codex) are highly stylized, and their low relief has a texture reminiscent of weathered stone. Similar medals depict the St. Vitus Cathedral and Vyšehrad. These were followed by medals commemorating famous battles (Battle of Mailberg, Battle of Flarchheim and the Imperial Lance, The Czechs on the Walls of Rome), which depict historical armour. The medal The Death of King Vratislaus, featuring a horse's head, is complemented by a falling royal crown and has the character of a small object. Vitanovský found his inspiration in the decoration of the Rotunda of Saint Catherine, but his work stands out for its simplicity and nobility of form, in keeping with modern medal art.

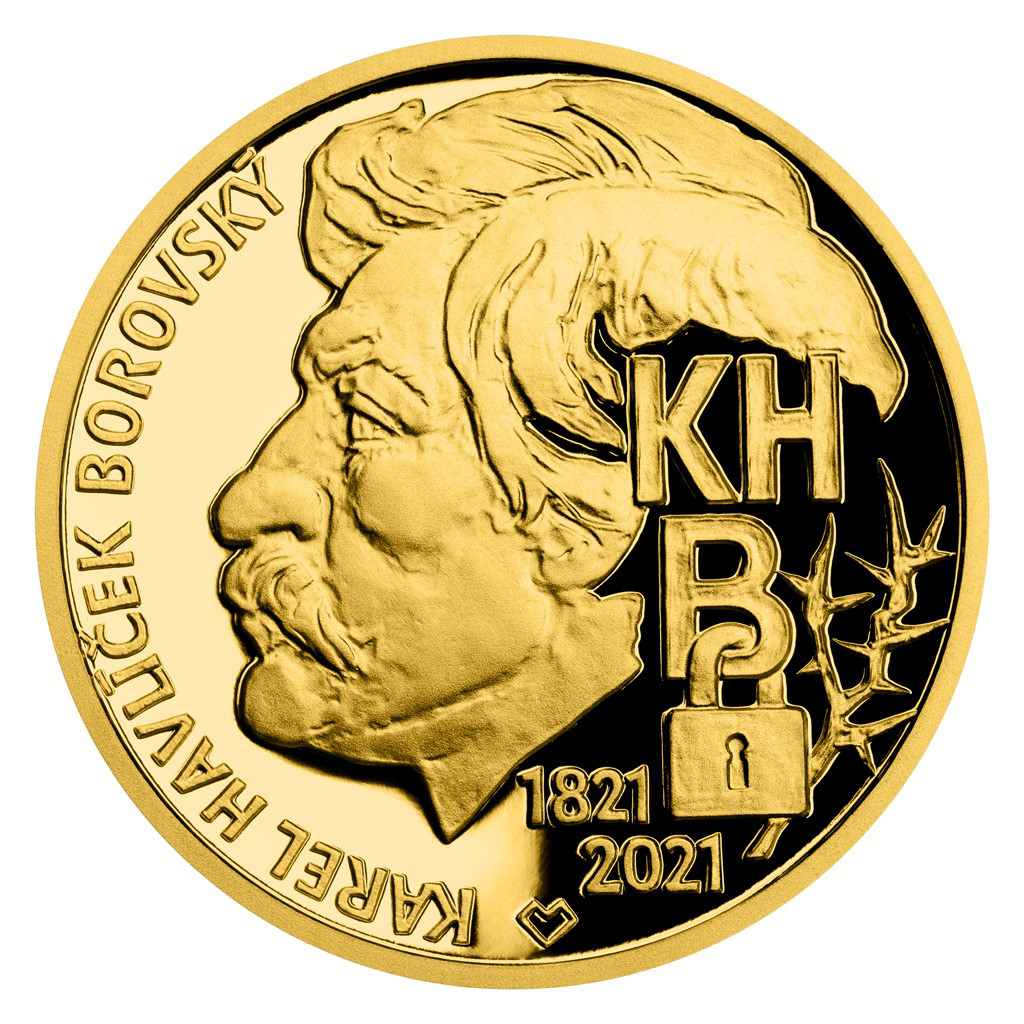
Michal Vitanovský - Karel Havlicek Borovsky, 2021, obverse

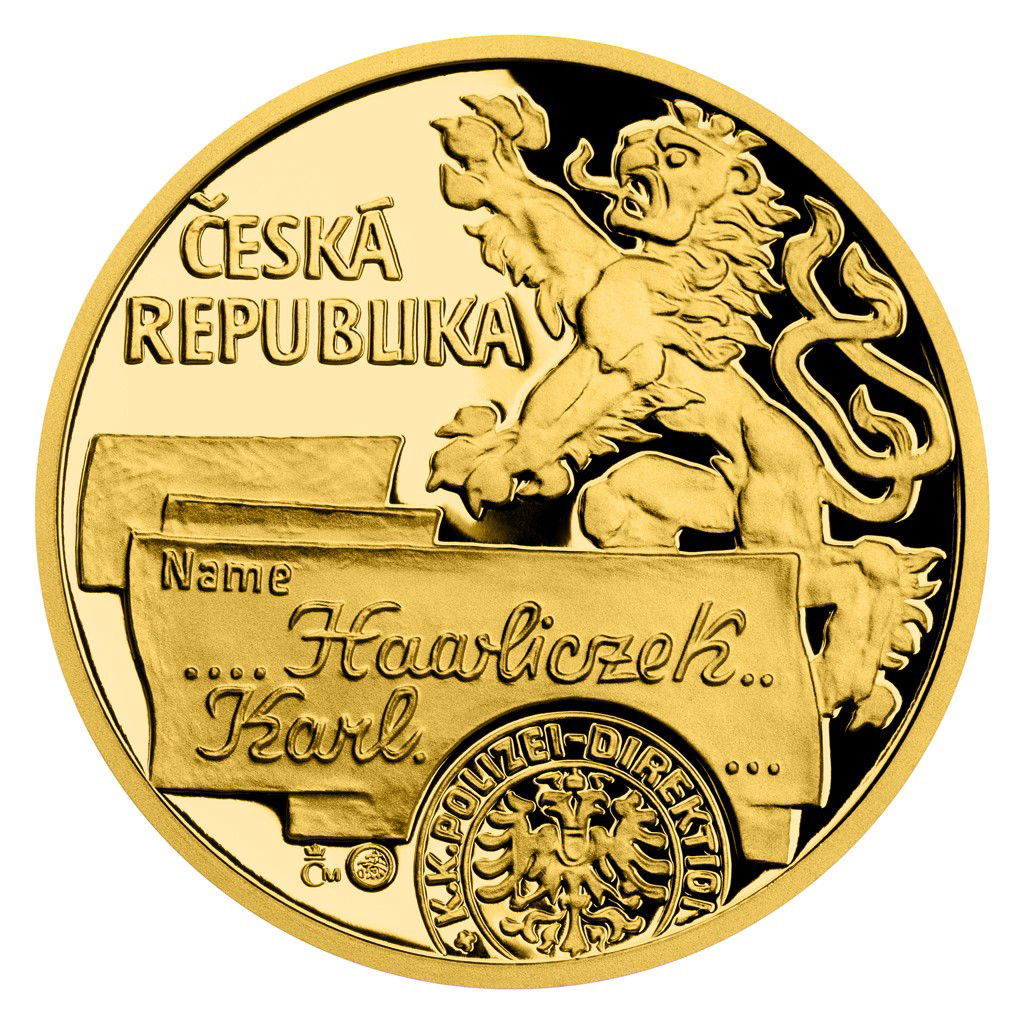
Michal Vitanovský - Karel Havlicek Borovsky, 2021, reverse

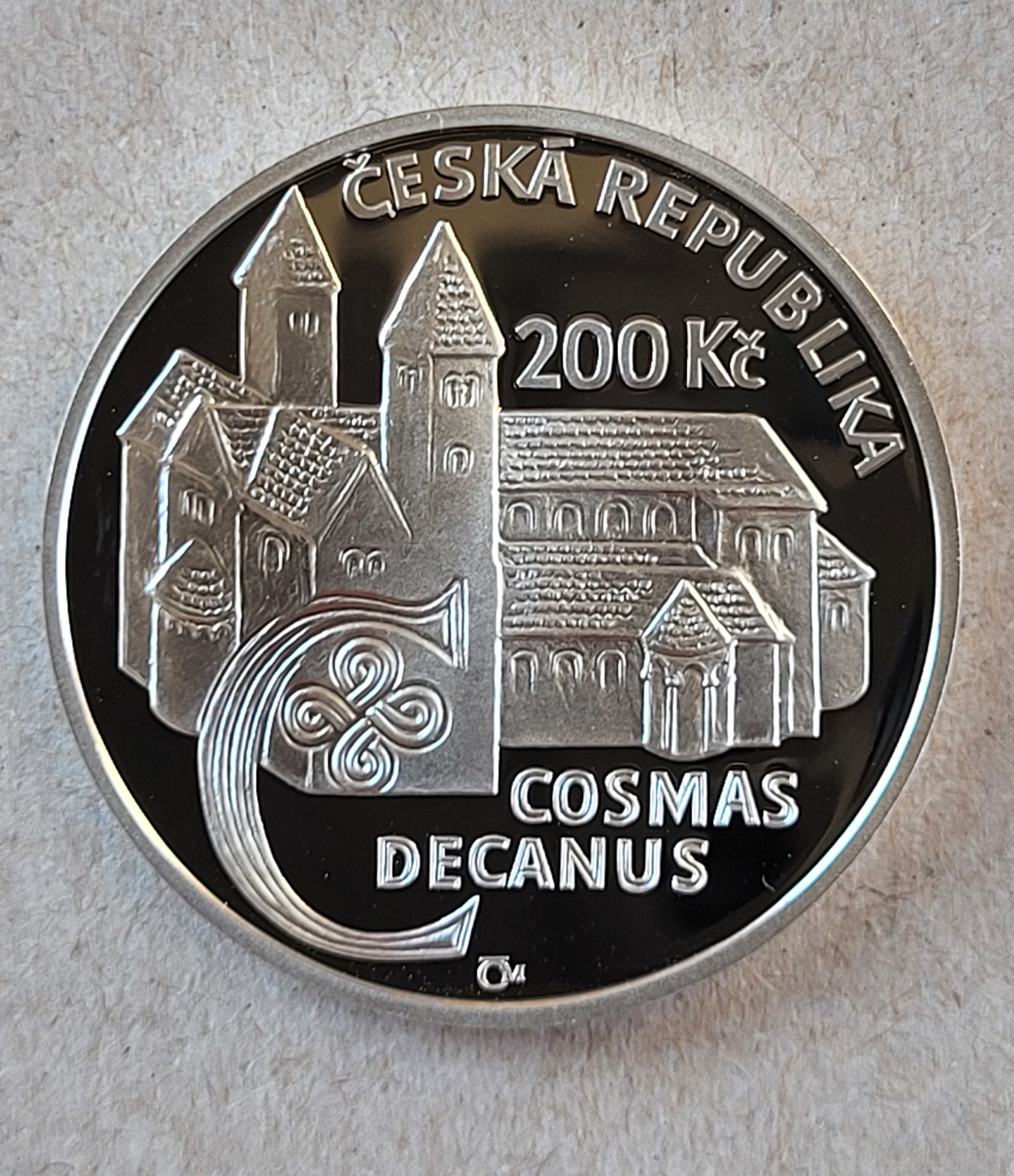
Michal Vitanovský - Cosmas of Prague 2025

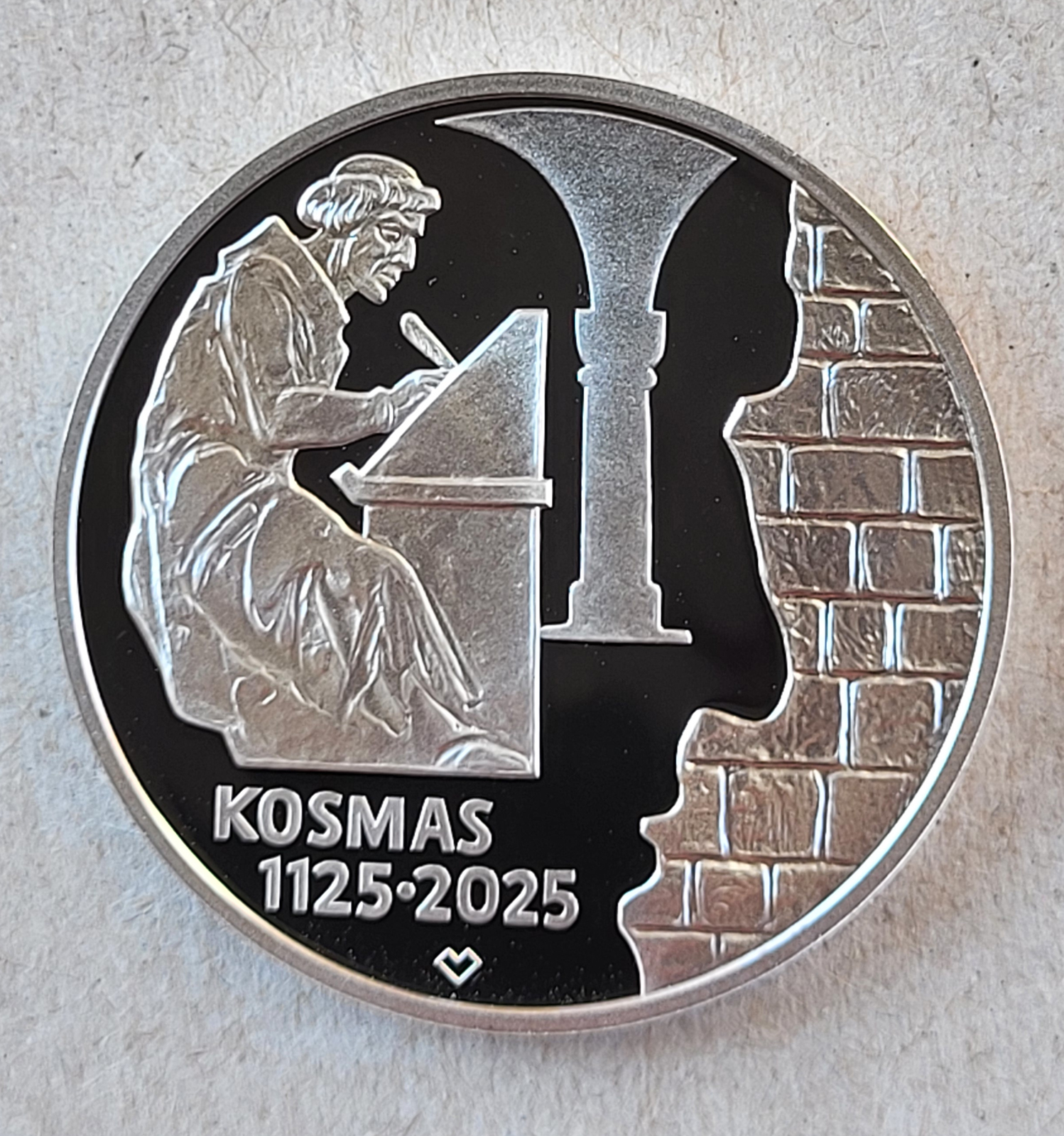
Michal Vitanovský - Cosmas of Prague 2025, reverse

Music and dance became a central theme for him when he met his future wife, a dancer with the National Theatre ensemble. The minimalist-to-abstract tribute to ballet, Grand Jeté (1977), employs stylized forms and a condensed treatment of the motif. It is part of the cycle Theatre, Music, Dance, which represents the expressively dynamic style of his work. In it, the dancer's gentle gestures, the figure's sudden movements, and the expressive faces of Shakespearean characters reflect the author's fascination with the poetics of the theatrical world. A series of polyester sculptures inspired by Commedia dell'arte stands apart from his previous work due to its grotesque, even terrifying, depictions of humanity (Prometheus II, Harlequin, Clown, 1976–1977).

The 18th century did not produce any particularly notable politicians or visual artists, but it became famous for a number of musical figures, as Bohemia was known at the time as the Conservatory of Europe. On the medals, Vitanovský depicted, in his own distinctive style, composers who were renowned for their works at that time (Tůma, Vranický, Černohorský, Richter, Dusík, Stamitz, Benda, Mysliveček). In creating the medals, he utilized a full range of artistic techniques, including embossing and perforation. The outline references Baroque cartouches and rocaille motifs, yet is distinctly contemporary. The regular repetition of lines evokes a musical rhythm.

Vitanovský continued his thematic series of medals, such as the Cosmic Trio, or a series on the theme of writing (Palimpsest, Yesterday’s News, Report), in which he employed techniques such as overlaying or scraping away surfaces, and a fictional natural history series titled Leaves from the Bestiary. He explored sacred themes in four large, informel-style plaques titled Reliquary. His medal featuring an Angel paraphrases the works of the old masters and uses the mystical elements of the theme as part of the human spiritual realm.

Starting in 1982, when he created a medal for an exhibition of Czechoslovak medals in Riga, he also designed minted medals. In total, he realized nearly six hundred of them.

Pressed medals adhere to the specifications and are characterized by a more civil and restrained form than artist-designed cast medals. These include portraits of Antonín Dvořák, Leoš Janáček, and Gustav Mahler (2000) Jan Evangelista Purkyně (part of the insignia of JEP University in Ústí nad Labem), Alois Rašín, Zikmund Winter, Otakar Březina (1998) or Karel Čapek. A medal bearing the portrait of Karel Engliš became part of the insignia of the Faculty of Economics and Public Administration at Masaryk University. In the 1990s, medals featuring portraits of Jan Masaryk (1994) and Jan Palach were minted. The reverse side of the Palach medal, which is awarded to students of the Faculty of Arts at Charles University, features the university's historical coat of arms. He also designed a gold commemorative medal and a seal for Charles University. At the turn of the century, he was, among other tasks, the designer of double-sided medals for Café Slavia (1998), Bohumil Hrabal (2004), Albrecht von Wallenstein, coins featuring George of Poděbrady, Vyšší Brod, and the 800th anniversary of the founding of the Velehrad Monastery.

Jewish themes in his work are represented by medals of Isaac Babel, Franz Kafka, and Salomon Hugo Lieben, director of the Jewish Museum in Prague (1996), a commemorative medal marking the anniversary of the deportation of Jews from Cologne, and a medal commemorating the 100th anniversary of the founding of the Jewish Museum in Prague (2006).

He designed the Czechoslovak Order of T. G. Masaryk (1990) and the Czech Order of the White Lion (1994), as well as a number of departmental decorations of the Ministry of Defense and nine commemorative coins (including those of Agnes of Bohemia, several versions of St. Zdislava, and the chronicler Cosmas of Prague), minted in gold or silver. He designed insignia and mayoral chains for the towns of Kolín, Kouřim, and Volary, insignia and faculty scepers for many universities, and several versions of the Coat of arms of the Czech Republic for various institutions.

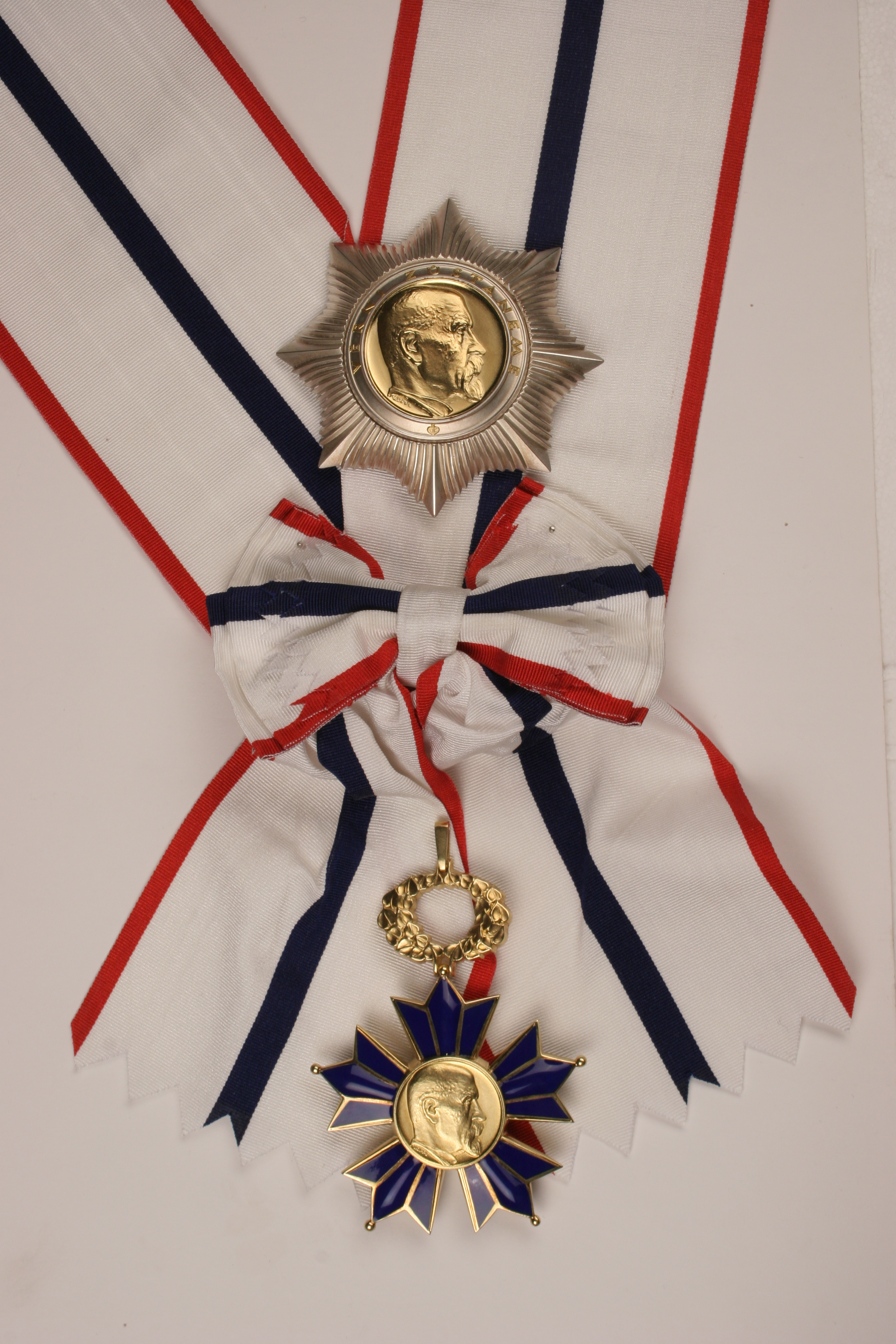
Michal Vitanovský - Order of Tomáš Garrigue Masaryk

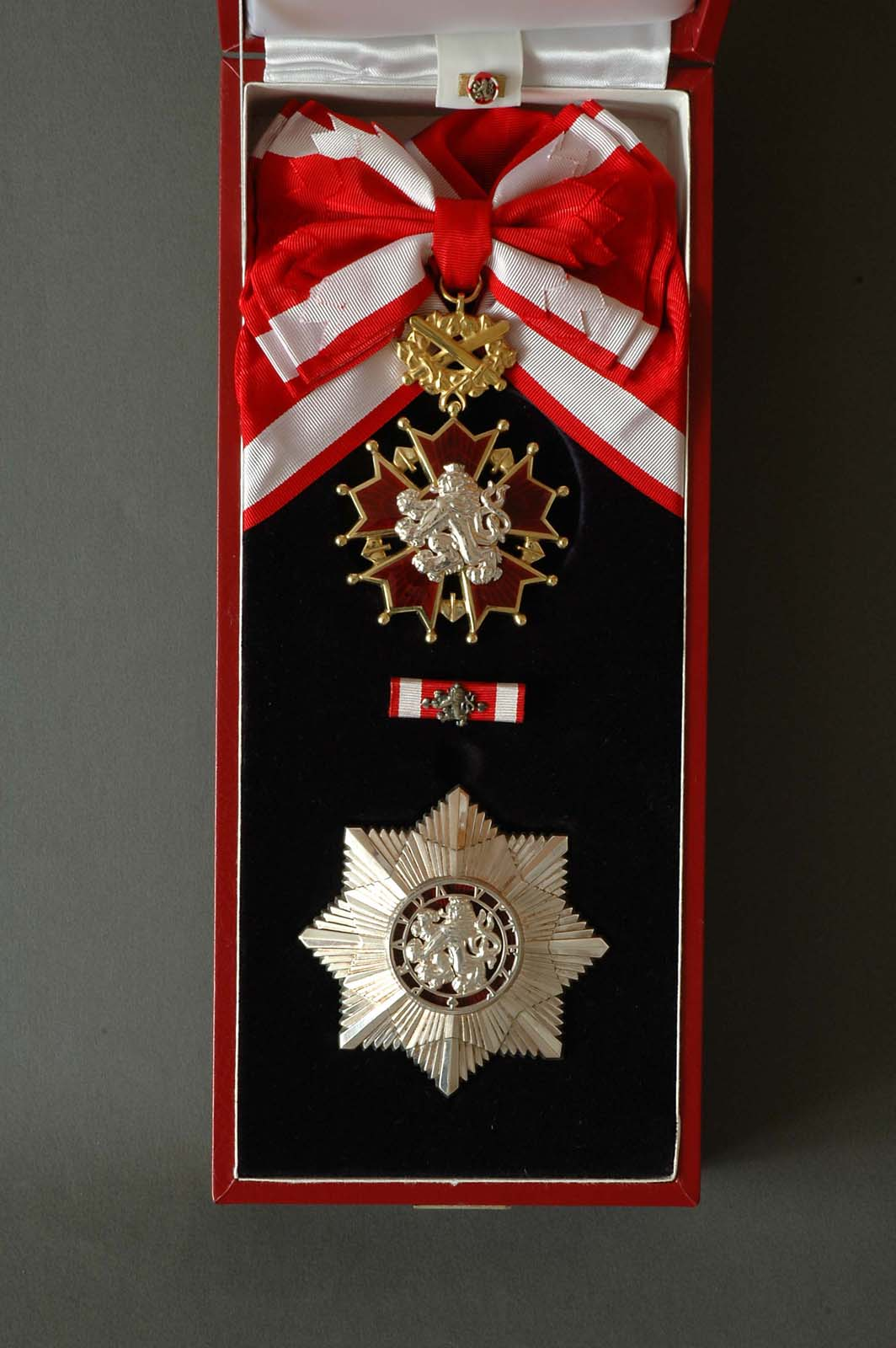
Michal Vitanovský - Order of the White Lion 1995

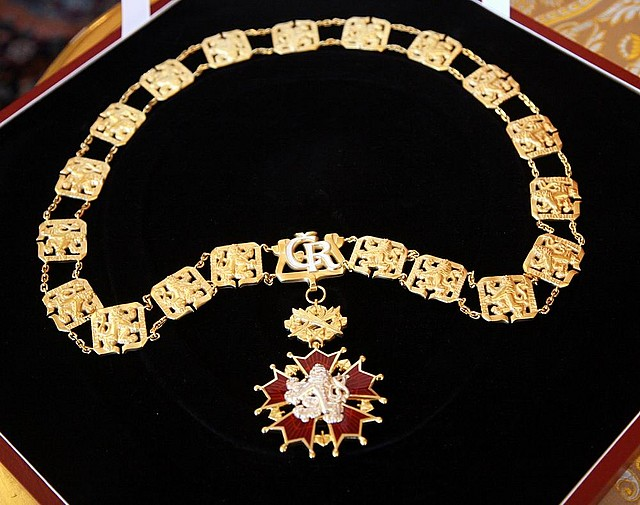
Michal Vitanovský - Order of the White Lion 1995

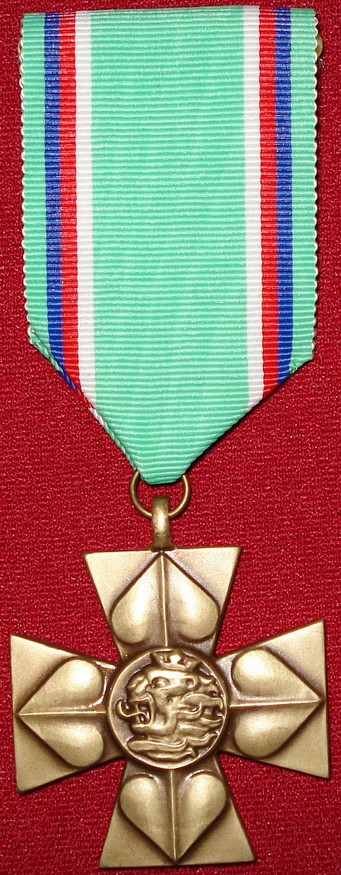
Michal Vitanovský - Cross of Merit of the Minister of Defense

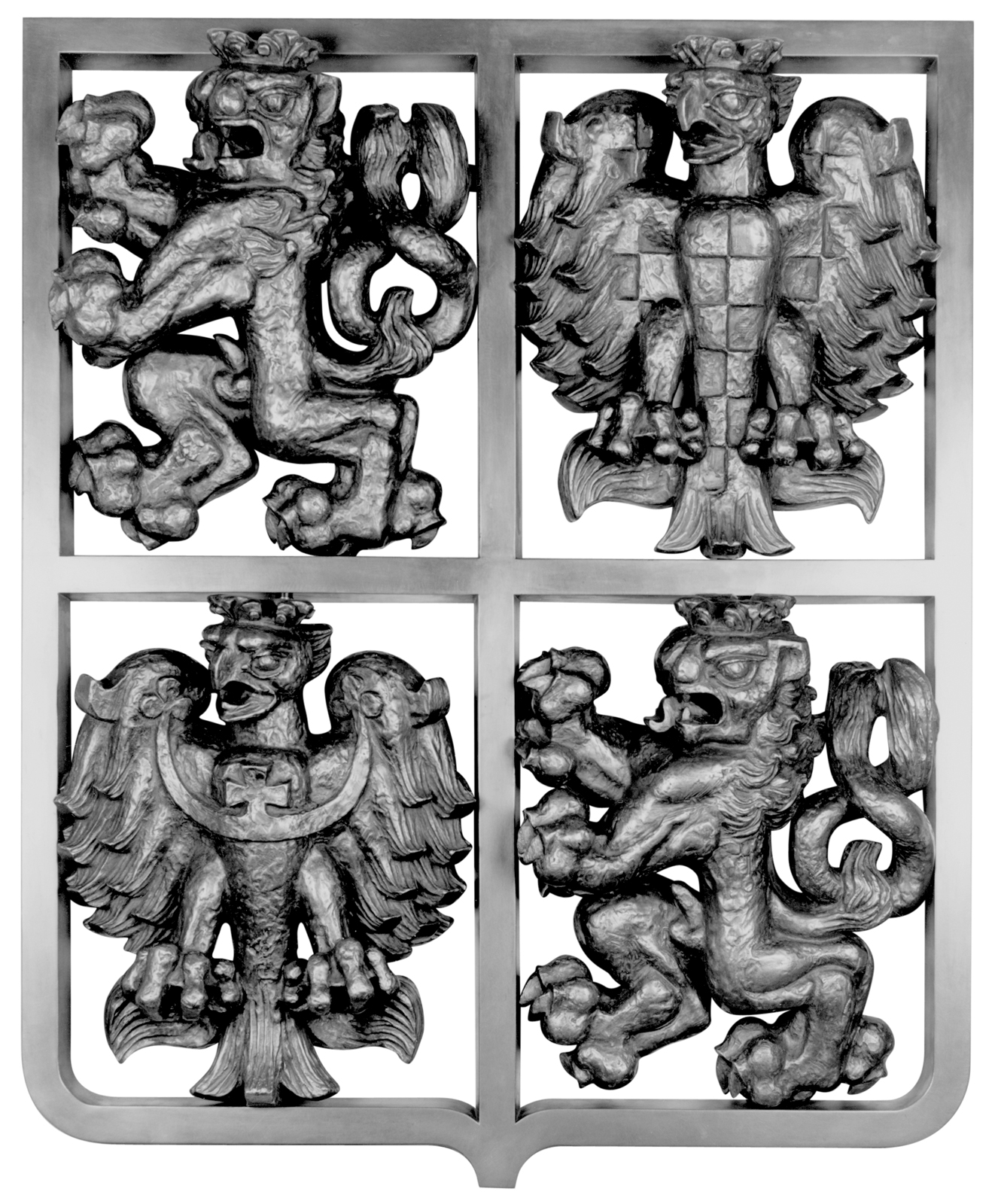
Michal Vitanovský - Coat of arms of the Czech Republic, Ministry of Foreign Affairs, Prague

After 1989, the opportunity arose to create several significant sculptures — Saint Adalbert for Libice nad Cidlinou (1997), a bust of Wenceslas II in Kutná Hora (1998), a memorial to Eliáš Lányi in Slovenské Pravno (2003), a commemorative plaque for Captain Václav Morávek in Kolín (2004), a commemorative plaque for Pavel Tigrid in Prague (2007), a commemorative plaque for Ottokar II of Bohemia in Městec Králové (2008), a commemorative plaque for the “Winter King” Frederick V of the Palatinate in Pyšely-Nová Ves (2010), commemorative plaques for Josef Hlávka in Vienna (2016) and at the Maternity hospital in Prague built by Hlávka (2016). The artist's life's work was presented in the monograph *Michal Vitanovský*, Regulus, Prague 2011.

His literary career began in 1978, when he wrote a text for the catalog of a joint exhibition with Pavel Sivko at the Fronta Gallery in Prague. At the suggestion of historian Jarmila Hásková, he reconstructed the likeness of Vratislaus I, Duke of Bohemia and, together with her, wrote a study in 1984 on Vratislav's personality and the history of his depictions on coins. Since the mid-1990s, he has published articles on the reliefs of Gothic and Renaissance tiles and has also devoted his scholarly interest to topography, heraldry, and genealogy. He contributes to the periodicals ‘'Archaeologia Historica’', ‘'Bankovnictví’', ‘’Dějiny a současnost‘’, “Folia numismatica,” “Genealogical and Heraldic Letters,” “Heraldic Yearbook,” “Kolínský pres,” “Beautiful City,” “Kremnický rumaj,” “Museum and Local History Work,” “The Medal,” “Mitali medajlen,” “Numismatic Letters,” “Top Secret! Nonfiction,” “Pyšelské listy,” “Pyšelský zpravodaj,” “Proceedings of the Přerov State District Archive,” “Proceedings of the National Museum,” “Antiques and Applied Arts,” “Tvorba,” “Visual Culture,” “Heritage Preservation Reports,” “Life.” Since 2022, he has also been writing fiction in the form of short stories inspired by Prague; three collections have been published so far.

=== Publications (selection) ===
- Osobnost krále Vratislava I. (1061–1092) na mincích. K oficiálnímu vyobrazení prvního českého krále a k české panovnické distinkci / The personality of King Vratislav I (1061–1092) on coins. On the official depiction of the first Czech king and on Czech royal insignia, in: Acta Musei Nationalis Pragae – Historia Praha: Národní muzeum, 1984, 38(4), p. 169-220 (with Jarmila Hásková)
- Akt na medaili a plaketě, II. salon členů AUM / Nude on a Medal and Plaque, 2nd AUM Members' Salon, Moravské zemské muzeum 1994
- Příspěvek k výrobě pozdně gotických kachlových matric – otázky výtvarné formy a technologie / A Contribution to the Production of Late Gothic Tile Molds—Questions of Artistic Form and Technology, in: Archeologia historica, 20, 1995, p. 539–550 (with Zdeněk Hazlbauer)
- Kavanova škola v současné české medaili / Kavan's School in Contemporary Czech Medal Art, in: Numismatické listy 50, 1995, s. 115–117
- Svět české mince a medaile, katalog stálé expozice ve Vlašském dvoře / The World of Czech Coins and Medals: Catalog of the Permanent Exhibition at Vlašský dvůr, Kutná Hora 1996 (with Helena Štroblová)
- Pět let českých pamětních mincí / Five Years of Czech Commemorative Coins, in: Numismatické listy 54, 1999, p. 39-42
- K počátkům Asociace umělců medailérů / On the origins of the Association of Medal Artists, in: Numismatické listy 56, 2001, p. 183-184
- Encyklopedie kachlů v Čechách, na Moravě a ve Slezsku. Ikonografický atlas reliéfů na kachlích gotiky a renesance / Encyclopedia of Tiles in Bohemia, Moravia, and Silesia: An Iconographic Atlas of Reliefs on Gothic and Renaissance Tiles, Libri, Prague 2004, ISBN 80-7277-238-4 (with Čeněk Pavlík)
- Pyšelská heraldika / Heraldry of Pyšely, 71 s., Regulus, Prague 2006, ISBN 978-80-86279-24-4
- Stavební dějiny Pyšel / The Architectural History of Pyšely, 200 p., Regulus, Prague 2014, ISBN 978-80-86279-47-3
- Heraldika na mincích a medailích / Heraldry on Coins and Medals, 296 p., Libri, Prague 2017, ISBN 9788072775590
- Písmo na mincích a medailích / Lettering on Coins and Medals, 300 p., Libri, Prague 2020, ISBN 978-80-7277-582-8
- Páv, collection of stories, 125 p., Bondy, Prague 2022, ISBN 978-80-88073-08-6
- Portrét na mincích a medailích / Portrait on Coins and Medals, 290 p., Libri, Prague 2024, ISBN 9788072776009
- Svědectví jáchymovského tolaru / Testimony of Jáchymov Tolar, Genealogické a heraldické listy 1, 2026, p. 66-67
- Lev, collection of stories, 135 p., B 2, Čerčany, 2024, ISBN 978-80-11-05603-2
- Brána, collection of stories, 154 p., B 2, Čerčany, 2025

=== Co-author ===
- Irena Loskotová, Krása, která hřeje. Výběrový katalog gotických a renesančních kachlů Moravy a Slezska / Beauty That Warms. A Selective Catalog of Gothic and Renaissance Tiles from Moravia and Silesia, Slovácké muzeum Uherské Hradiště 2008, ISBN 978-80-86185-70-5

=== Medals, orders, and insignia created (selection) ===
- Order of Tomáš Garrigue Masaryk, Jewel with a ribbon
- Order of Tomáš Garrigue Masaryk, Star, 1991
- The City Key of Kolín, 1993
- Order of the White Lion, Jewel, 1995
- Order of the White Lion, Star, 1995
- Cross of Merit from the Minister of Defense of the Czech Republic, 1996
- Injury Medal – an award from the Ministry of Defense of the Czech Republic, 1996
- IFOR - Award from the Ministry of Defense of the Czech Republic, 1996
- Sceptre Head, Faculty of Chemistry, VUT Brno
- St. George – Be Ready, 2005
- Sceptre Head, Dean's Chain, Faculty of Applied Informatics UTB Zlín, 2006
- Sceptre Head, Faculty of Humanities UTB Zlín, 2007
- Centre of brother Robin – Letohrad, 2008
- Commemorative Medal “90th Anniversary of the Office of the President of the Republic, 1918–2008”, 2008
- Sceptre Head, Mendel University in Brno, 2012
- Sceptre Head, Faculty of Agronomy, Mendel University in Brno, 2012
- Sceptre Head, Faculty of Forestry and Wood Sciences, Mendel University in Brno, 2012
- Sceptre Head, Faculty of Operations and Technology, Mendel University in Brno, 2012
- Sceptre Head, Faculty of Horticulture, Mendel University in Brno, 2012
- Sceptre Head, Faculty of Regional Development and International Studies, Mendel University in Brno, 2012
- Sceptre Head, Institute for Lifelong Learning, Mendel University in Brno, 2012
- Mayor's Chain, Kosmonosy, 2013
- Director's Chain, Institute of Forensic Engineering, VUT Brno, 2015
- Sceptre, Institute of Forensic Engineering, VUT Brno, 2015
- Knights' Order - Order of the Holy Sepulcher, 2023
- Knights' Order - Order of the Templars, 2023
- Knights' Order - Order of Saint Lazarus, 2024
- Knights' Order - Order of the Teutonic Knights, 2024
- Knights' Order - Order of St. John, 2024
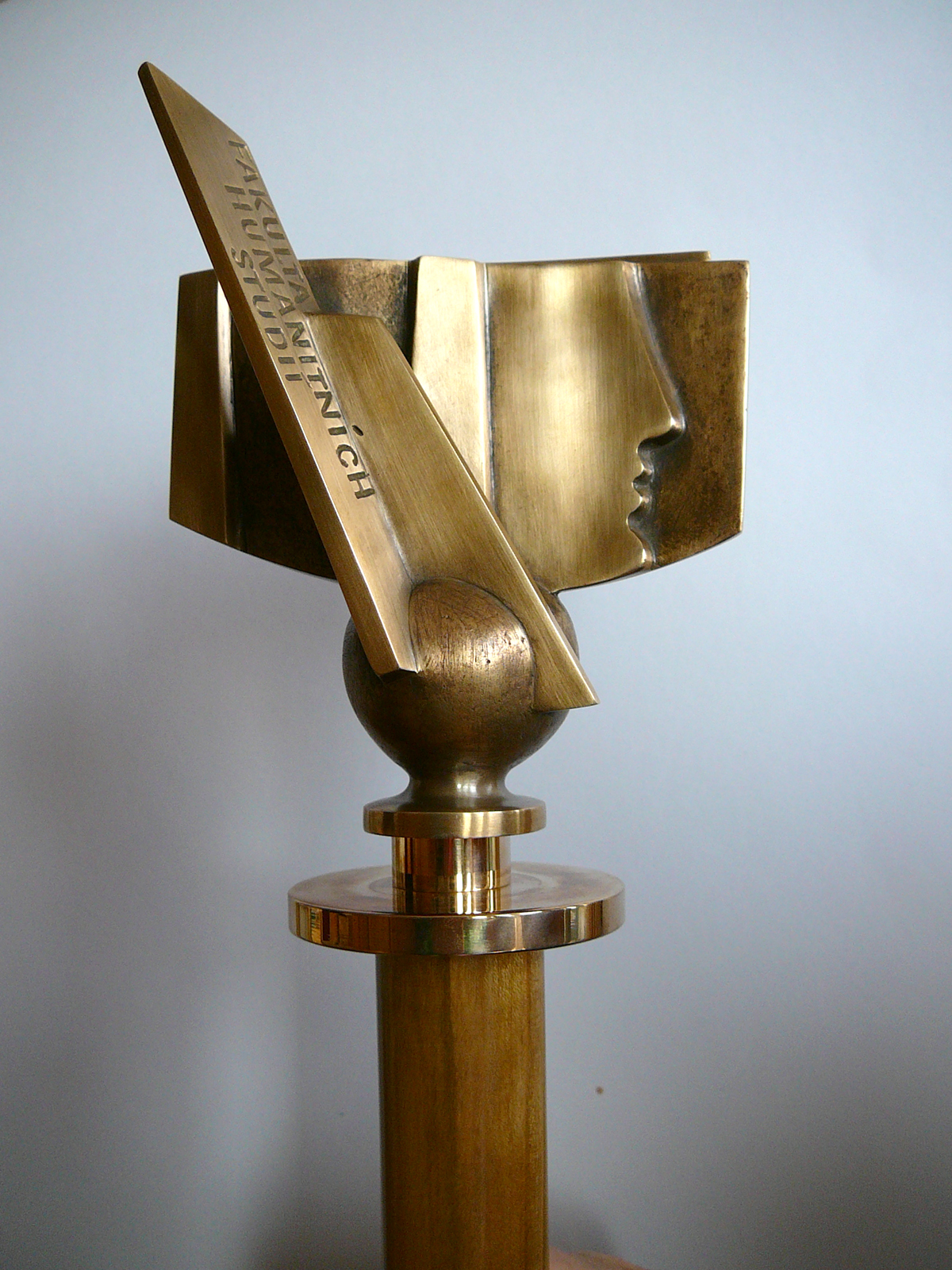
Michal Vitanovský - Sceptre Head, Faculty of Humanities UTB Zlín 2007

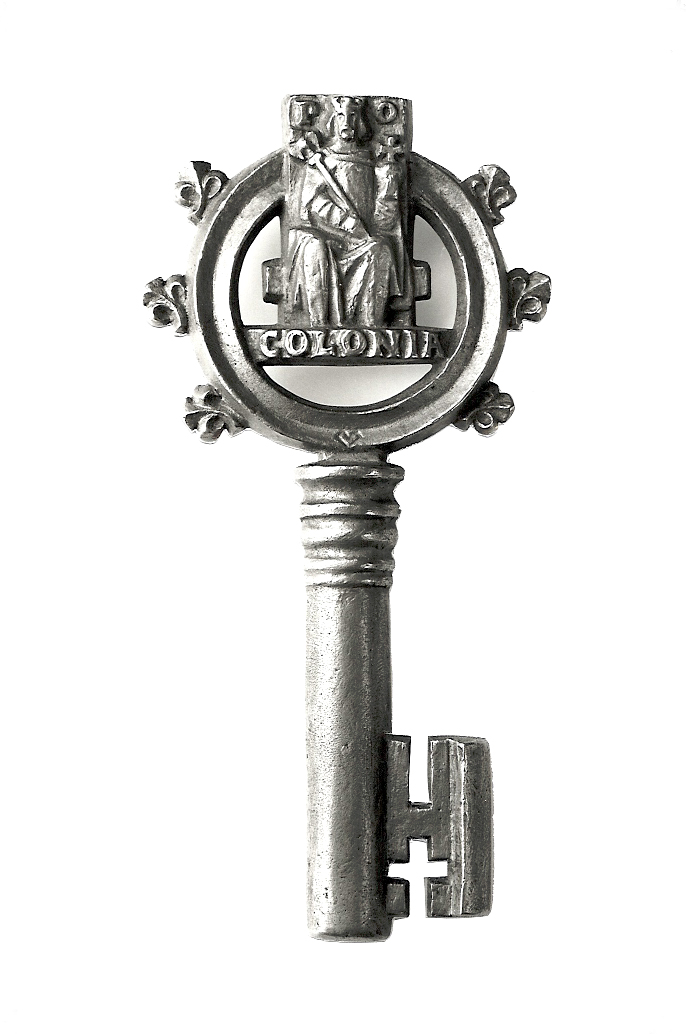
Michal Vitanovský - The City Key of Kolín

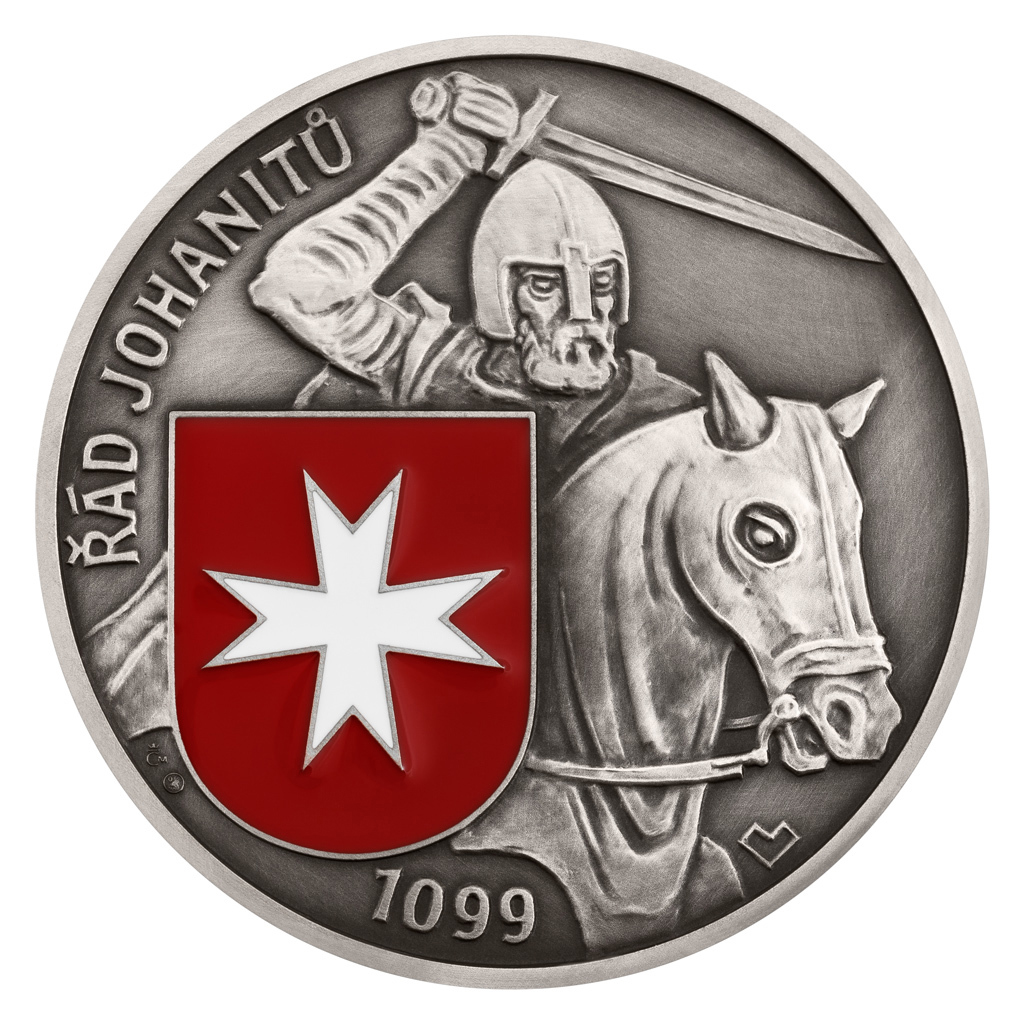
Michal Vitanovský - Knights' Order - Order of St. John, 2024, obverse

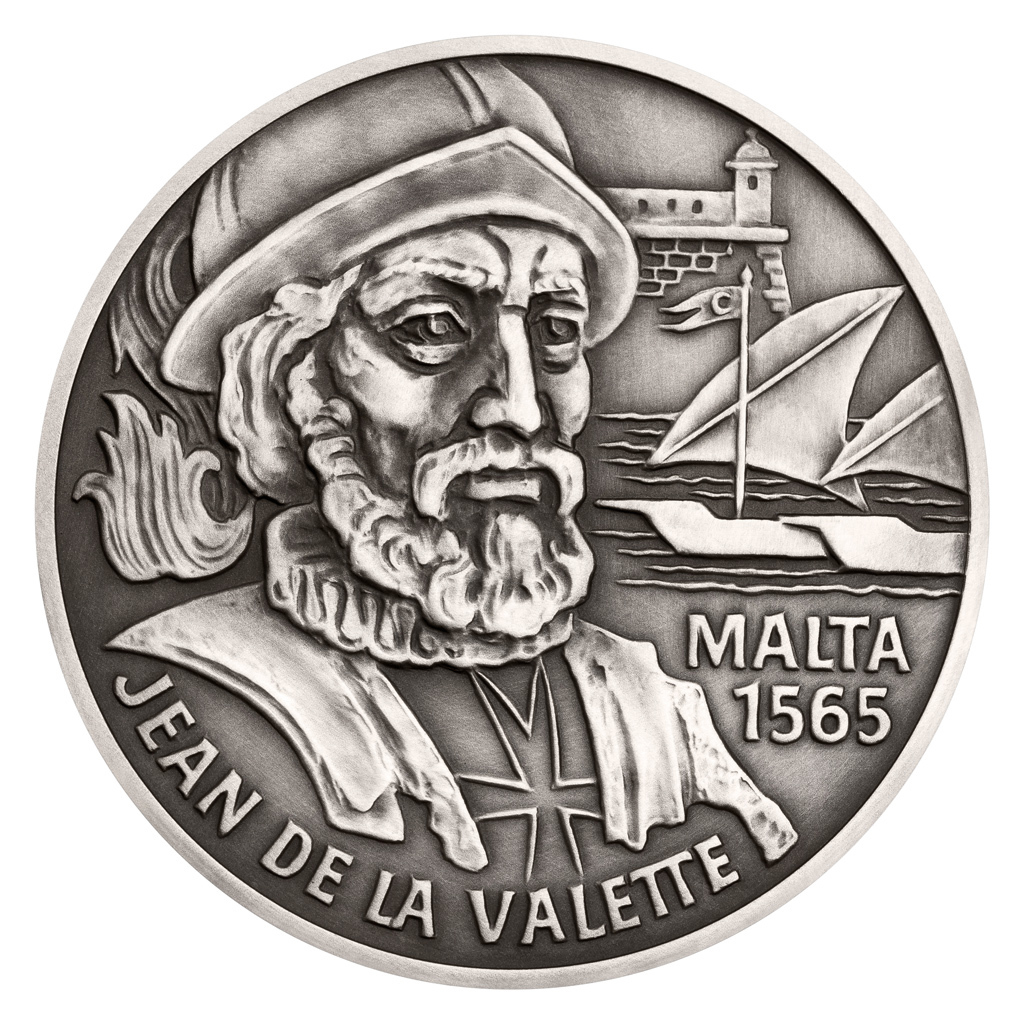
Michal Vitanovský - Knights' Order - Order of St. John, 2024, reverse

=== Sculptural works (selection) ===
- Prométheus, 1971
- Petr Cingr Commemorative Plaque, Hudlice, 1975
- Sculpture for the kindergarten in Smržovka, 1978
- Commemorative Plaques for the Workers' House, SONP Kladno, 1981
- Relief Sculpture for the canteen of VŠE Prague, 1982
- Memorial of Peasant revolt of 1775, Konopiště, 1988
- Pravoslav Kotík Commemorative Plaque, Prague 7, 1989
- Memorial of The Vow of Saint Adalbert of Prague in Libice nad Cidlinou, 1997
- Wenceslaus II of Bohemia, Vlašský dvůr, Kutná Hora, 1998
- Guard, Kutná Hora, 1998
- Eliáš Lányi Memorial, Slovenské Pravno, 2003
- Václav Morávek Commemorative Plaque, Kolín, 2004
- Pavel Tigrid Commemorative Plaque, Prague, 2007
- Ottokar II of Bohemia Commemorative Plaque, Městec Králové, 2008
- The Raftsman of Davle, 2008
- Cross at Všeň airfield, 2009
- Frederick V of the Palatinate Commemorative Plaque, Pyšely, 2010
- The Invisible Network, Faculty of Information Technology, Brno, 2010
- Graffito /design/ - Mythological and Hunting Motif, Tvrz Orlice, 2010–2011
- Josef Hlávka Commemorative Plaque, Prague, 2015
- Josef Hlávka Commemorative Plaque, Vienna, 2016
- Přemysl Šámal Commemorative Plaque, Prague, 2019
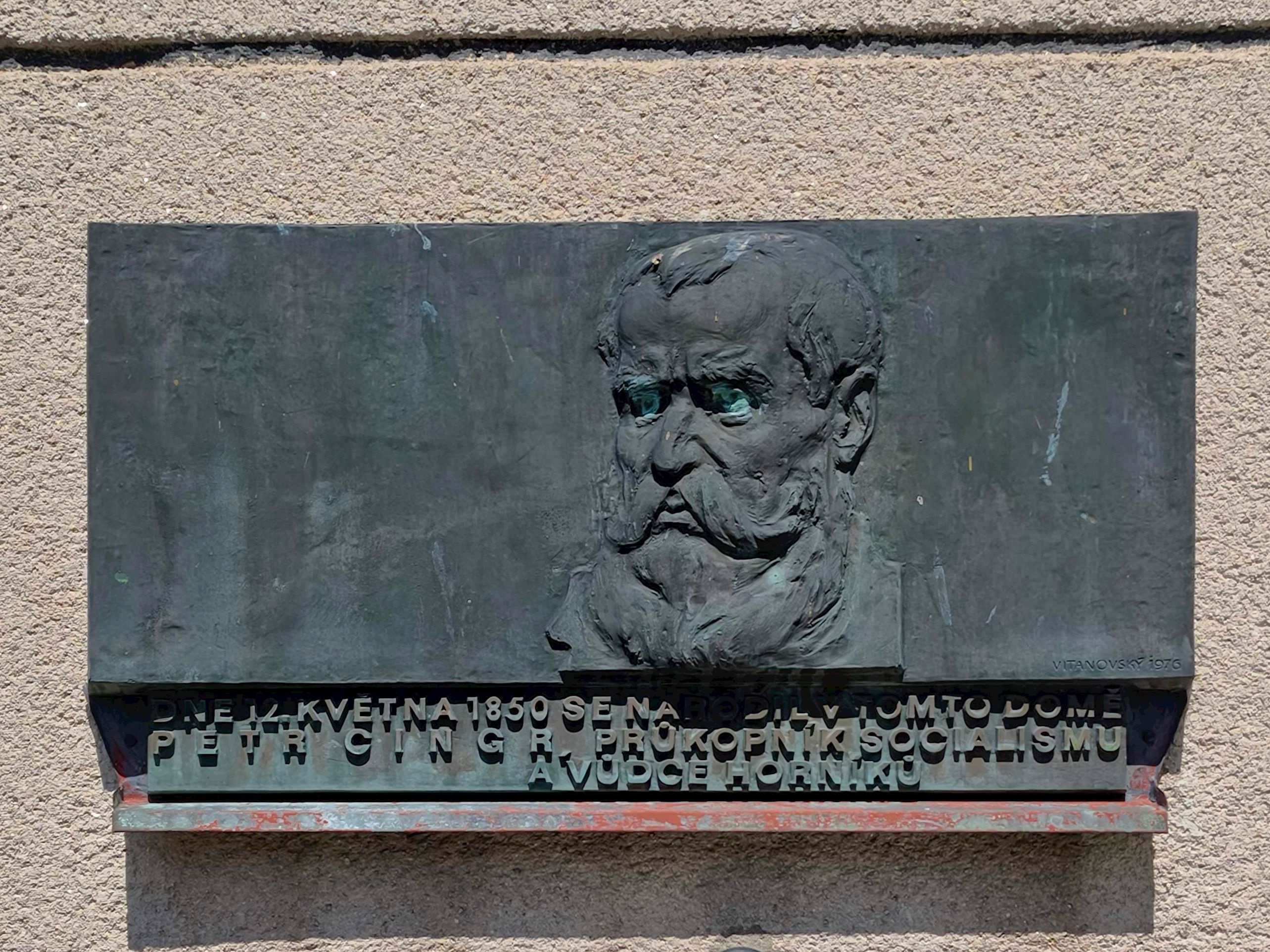
Michal Vitanovský - Petr Cingr Commemorative Plaque, Hudlice

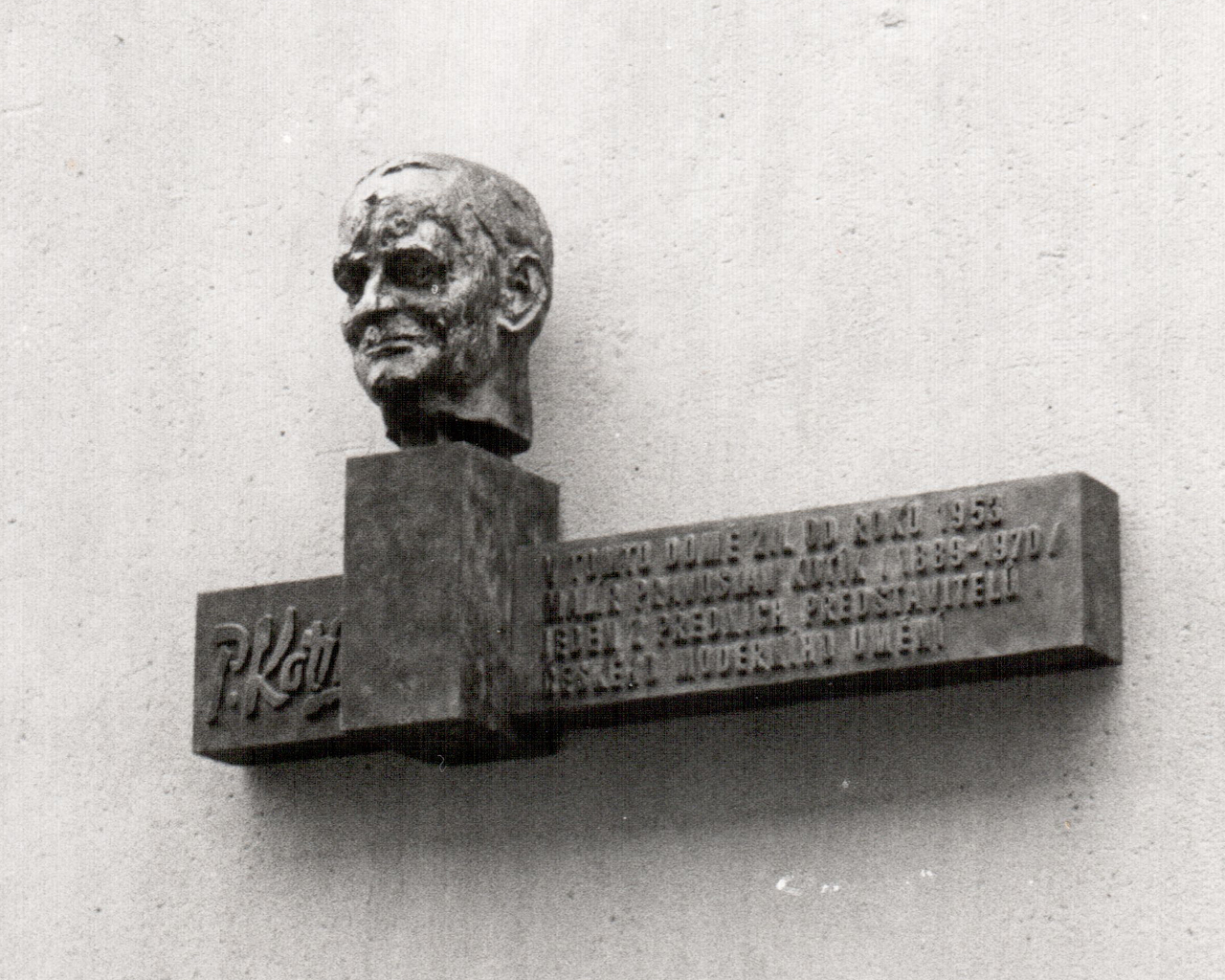
Michal Vitanovský - Pravoslav Kotík Commemorative Plaque, Prague, 1989

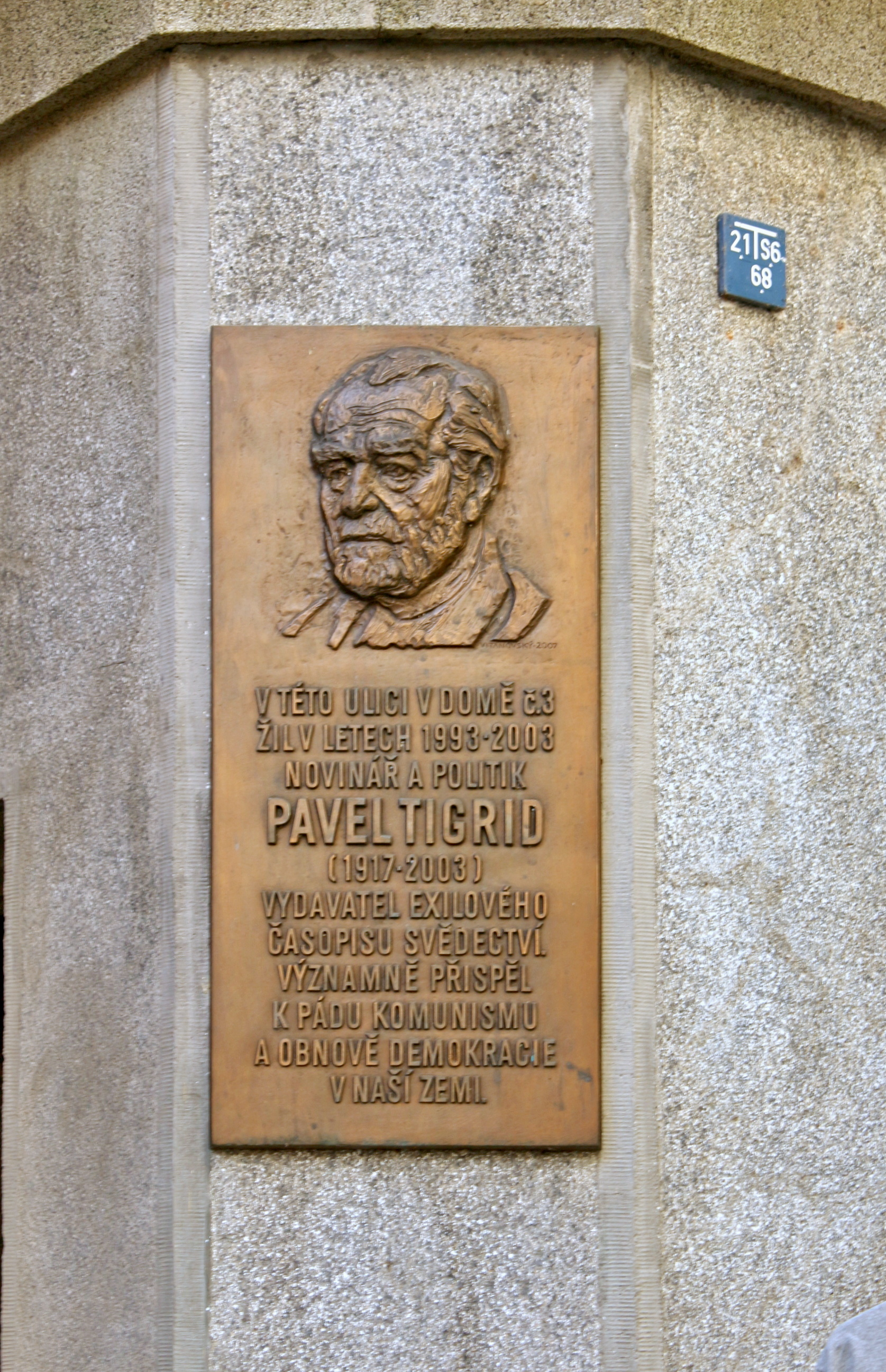
Michal Vitanovský - Pavel Tigrid Commemorative Plaque, Prague - Josefov

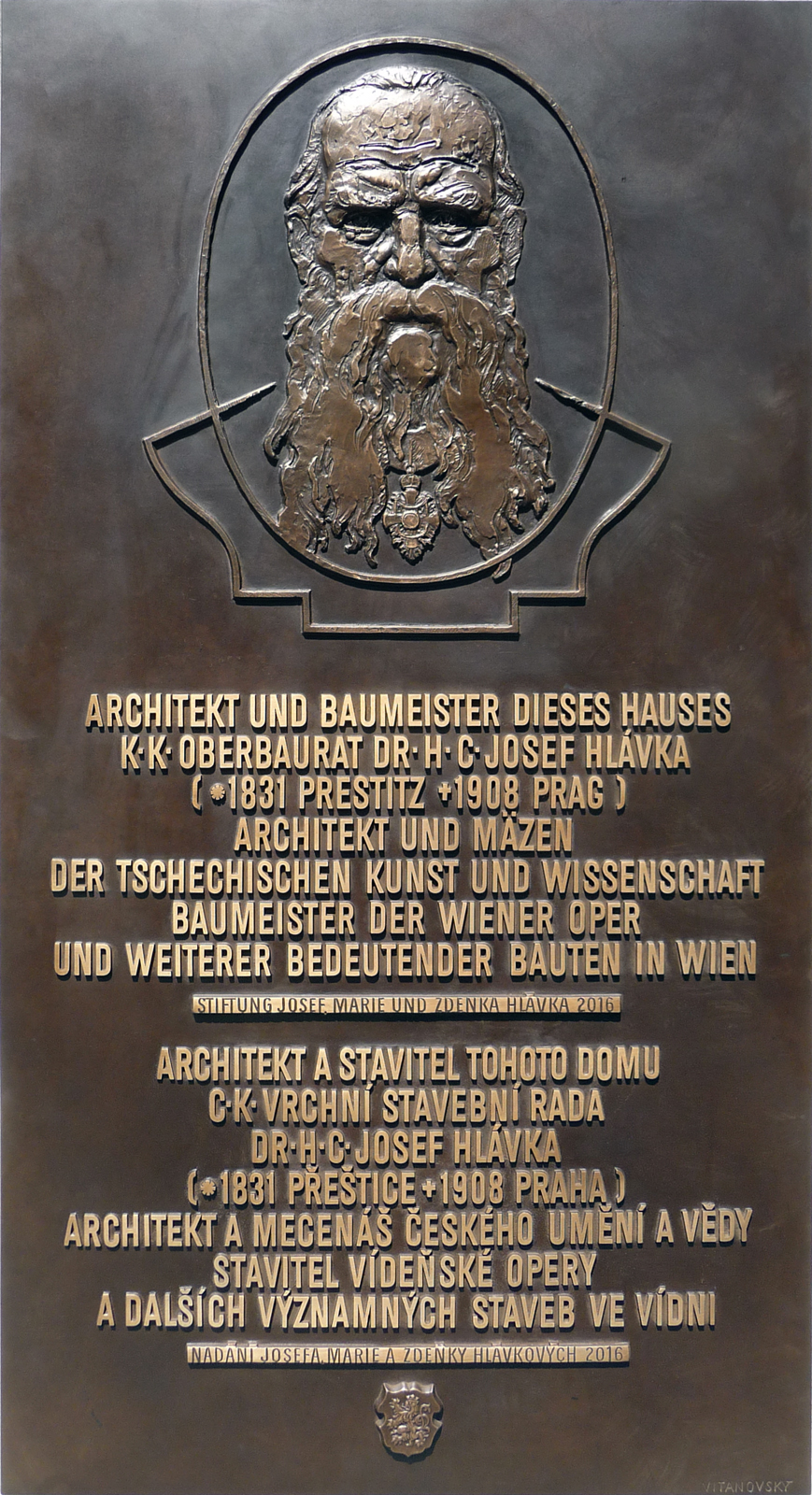
Michal Vitanovský - Josef Hlávka Commemorative Plaque, Vienna, 2016

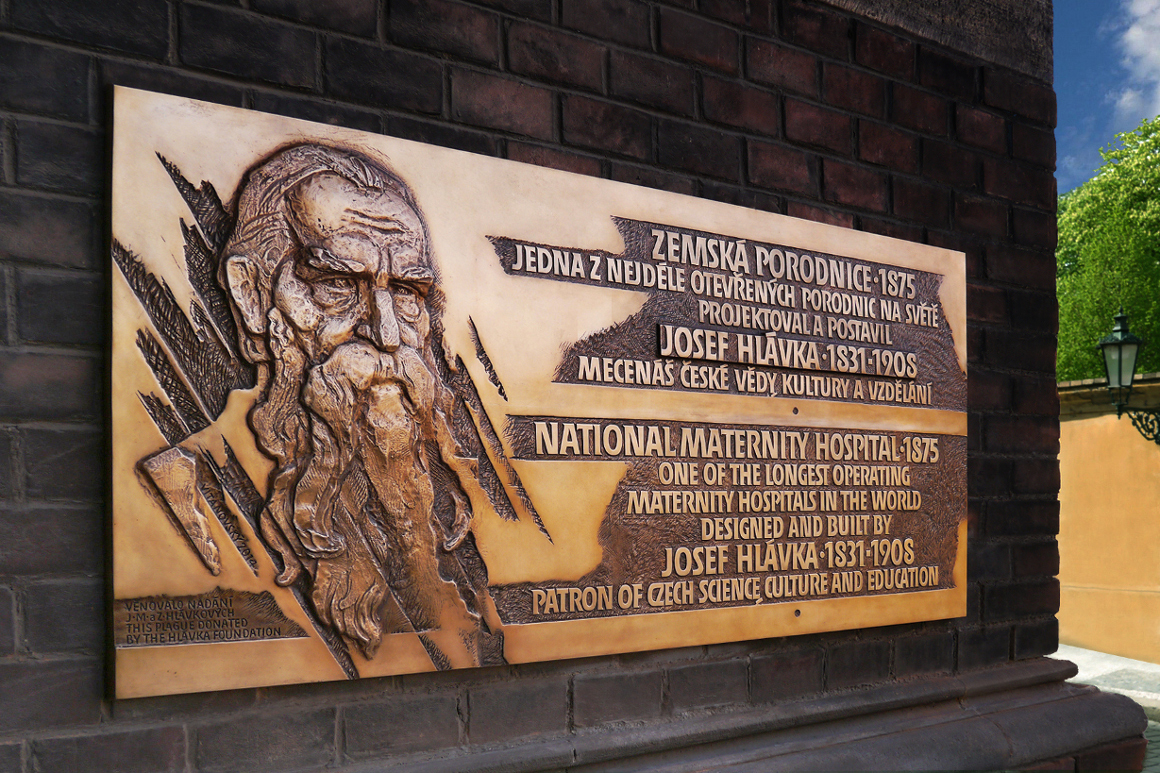
Michal Vitanovský - Josef Hlávka Commemorative Plaque, Prague

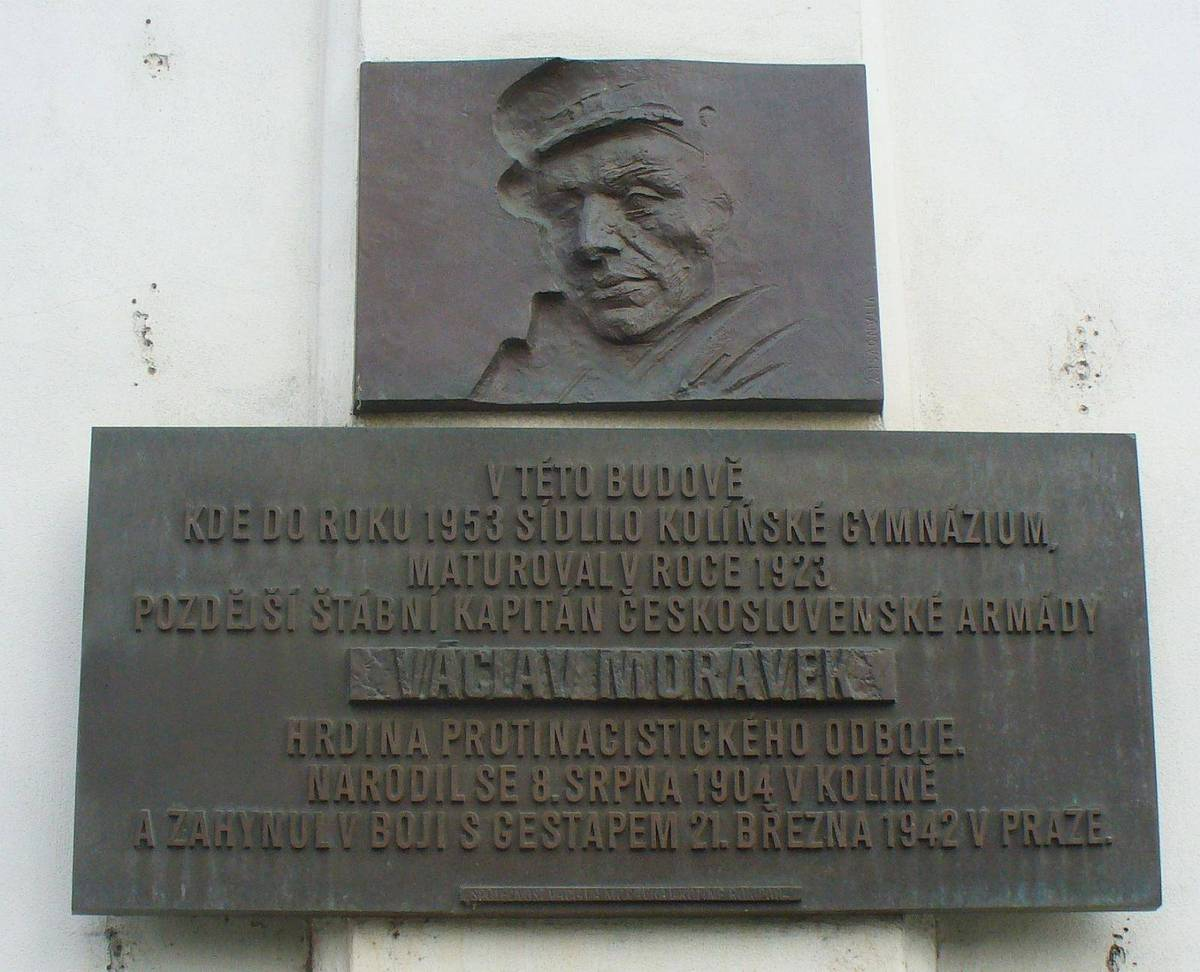
Michal Vitanovský - Václav Morávek Commemorative Plaque, Kolín

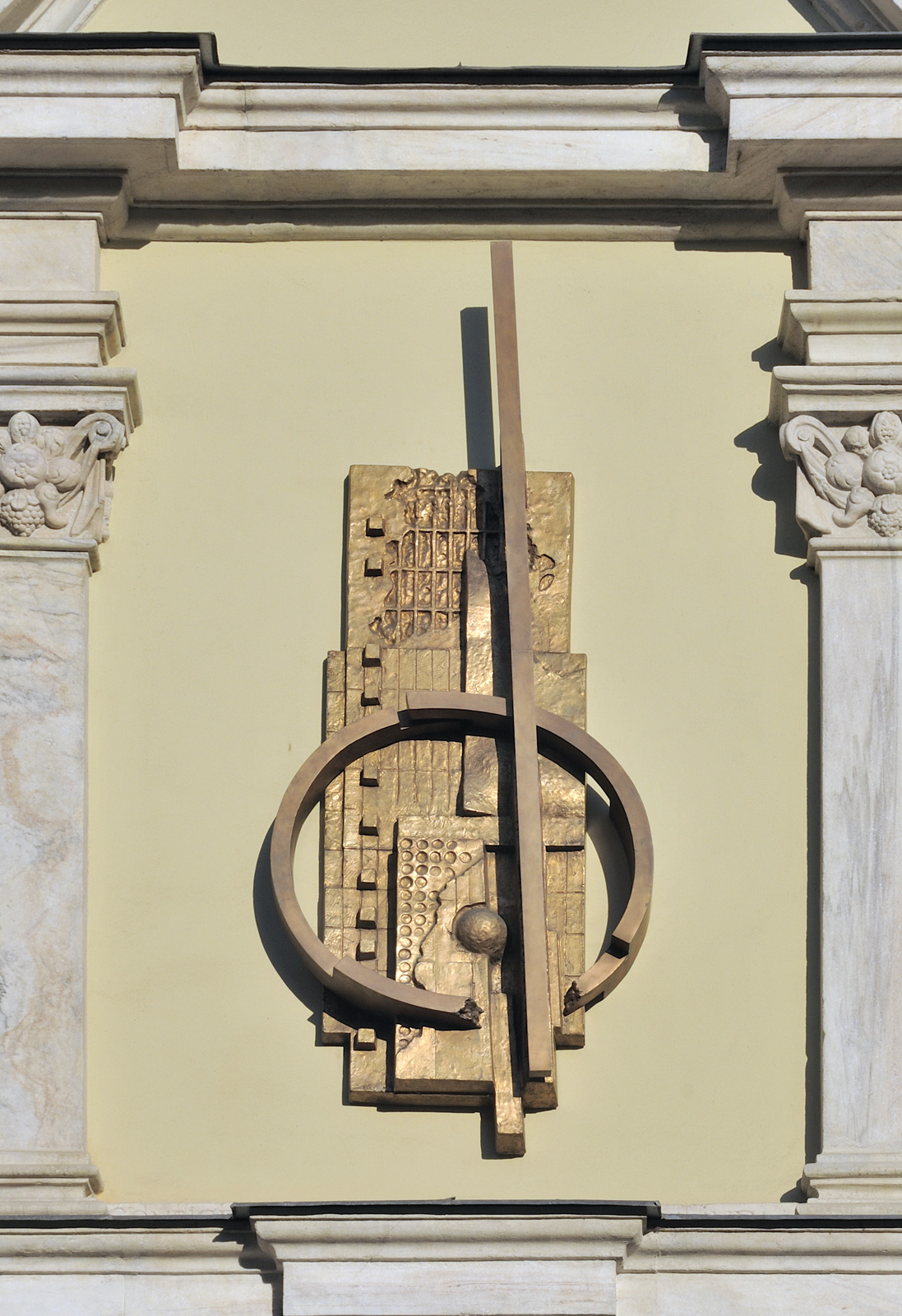
Michal Vitanovský - The Invisible Network, Faculty of Information Technology, Brno, 2010
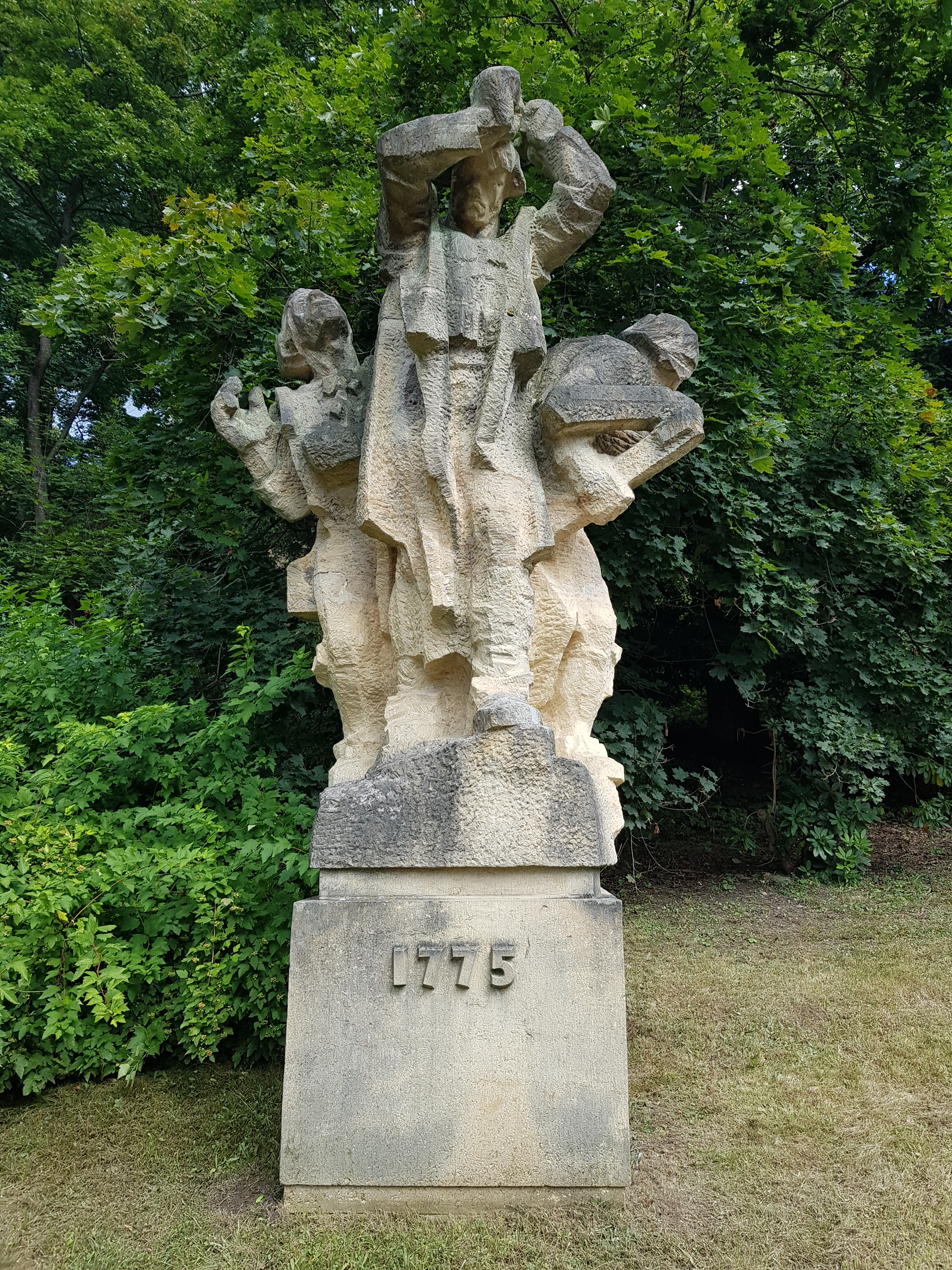
Michal Vitanovský - Memorial of Peasant revolt of 1775, Konopiště

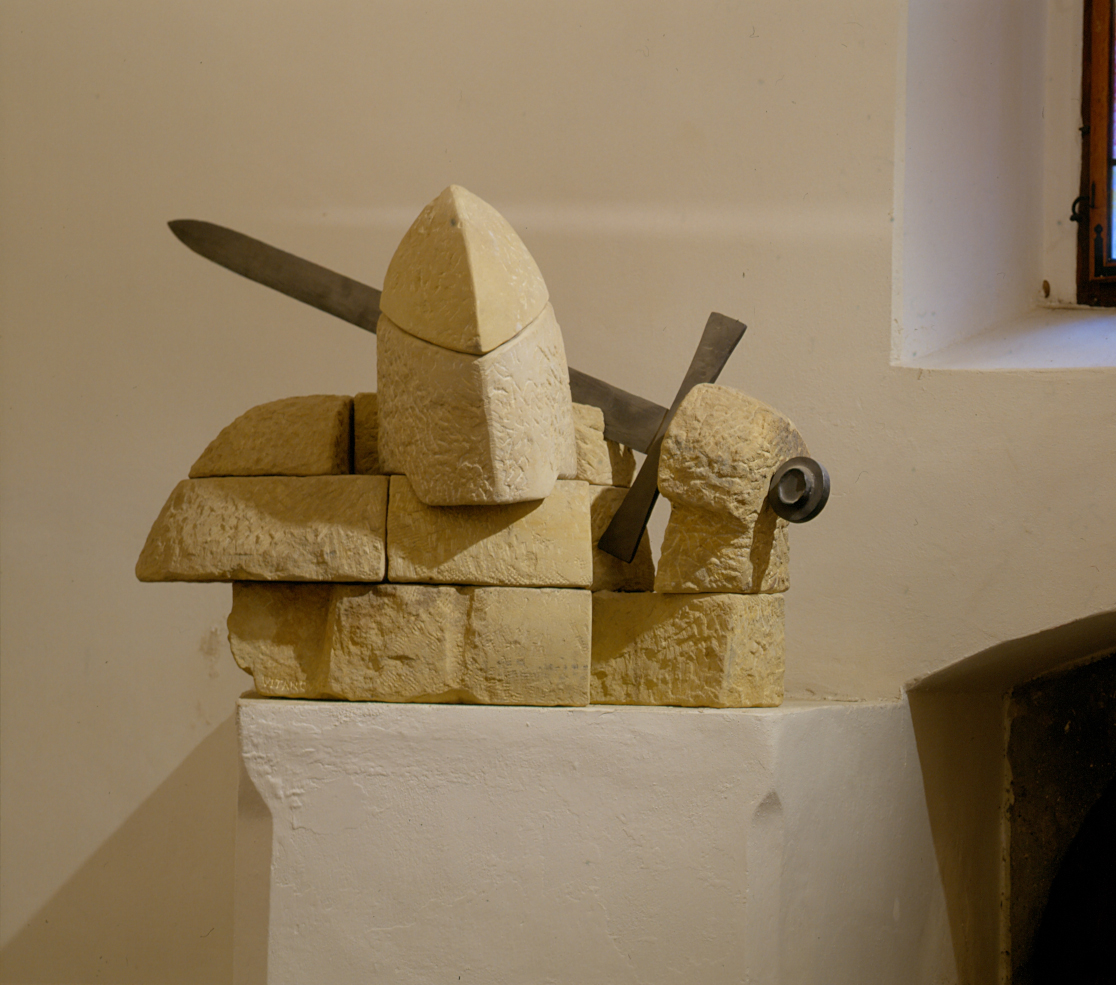
Michal Vitanovský - Guard, Kutná Hora, 1998

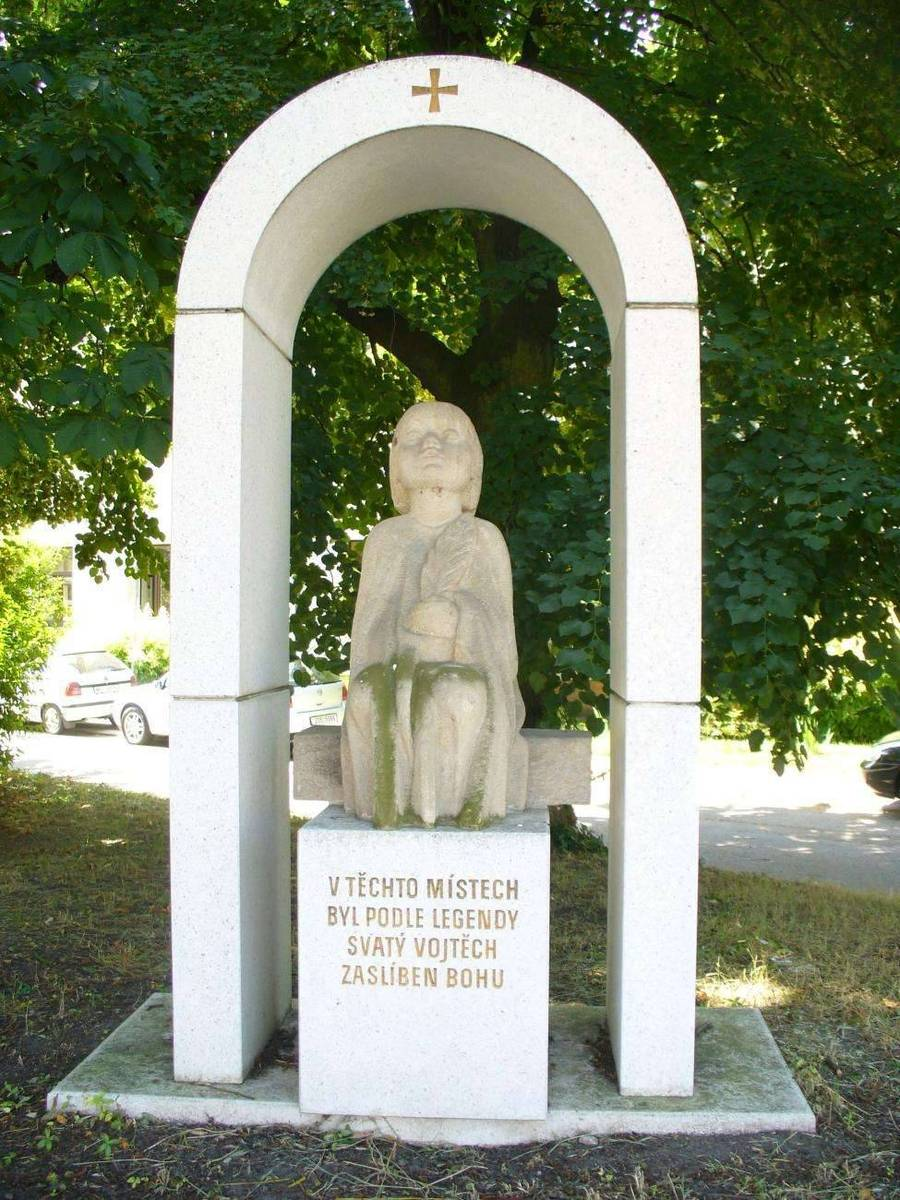
Michal Vitanovský - Memorial of The Vow of St. Adalbert in Libice nad Cidlinou,

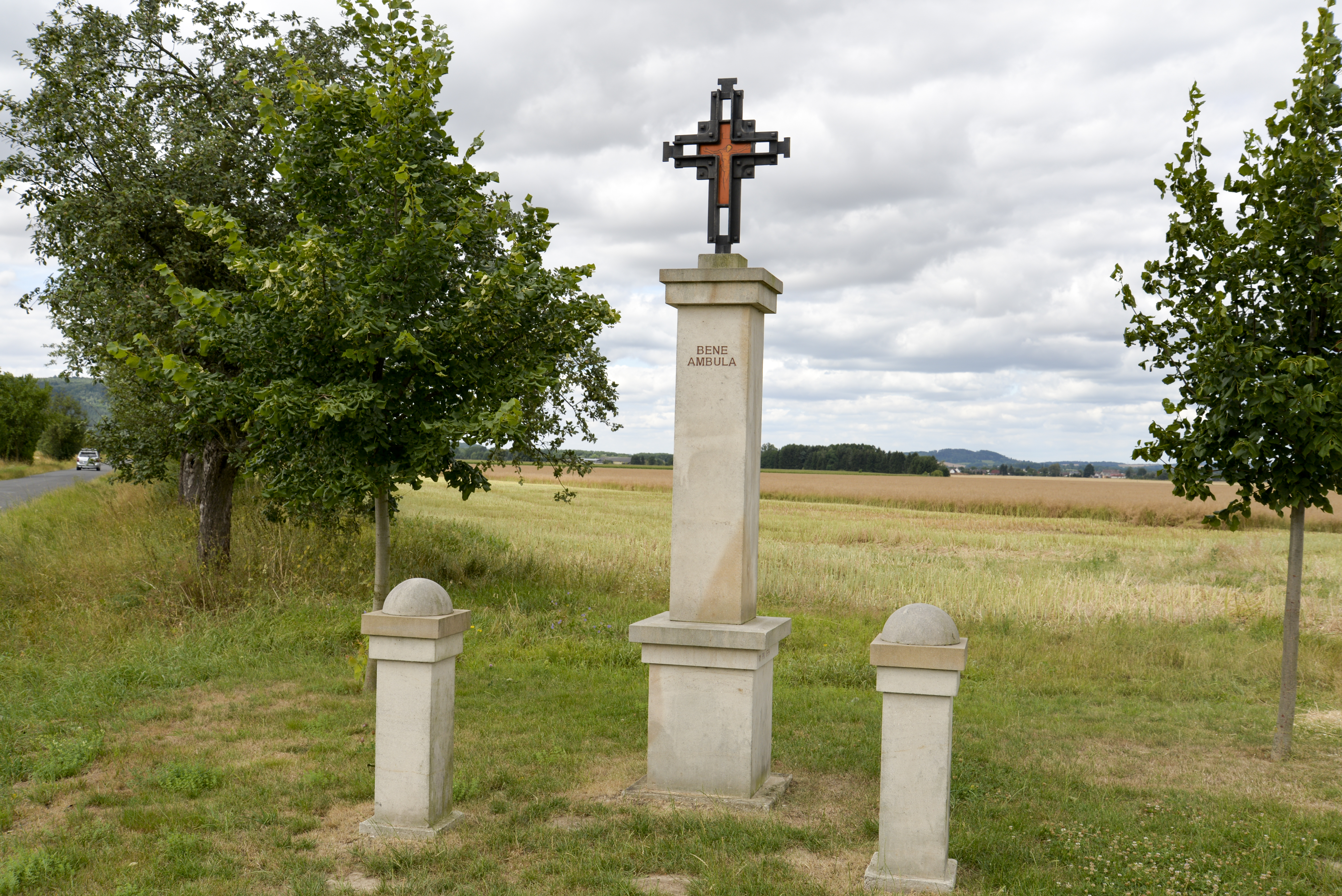
Michal Vitanovský - Cross Bene ambula, Všeň

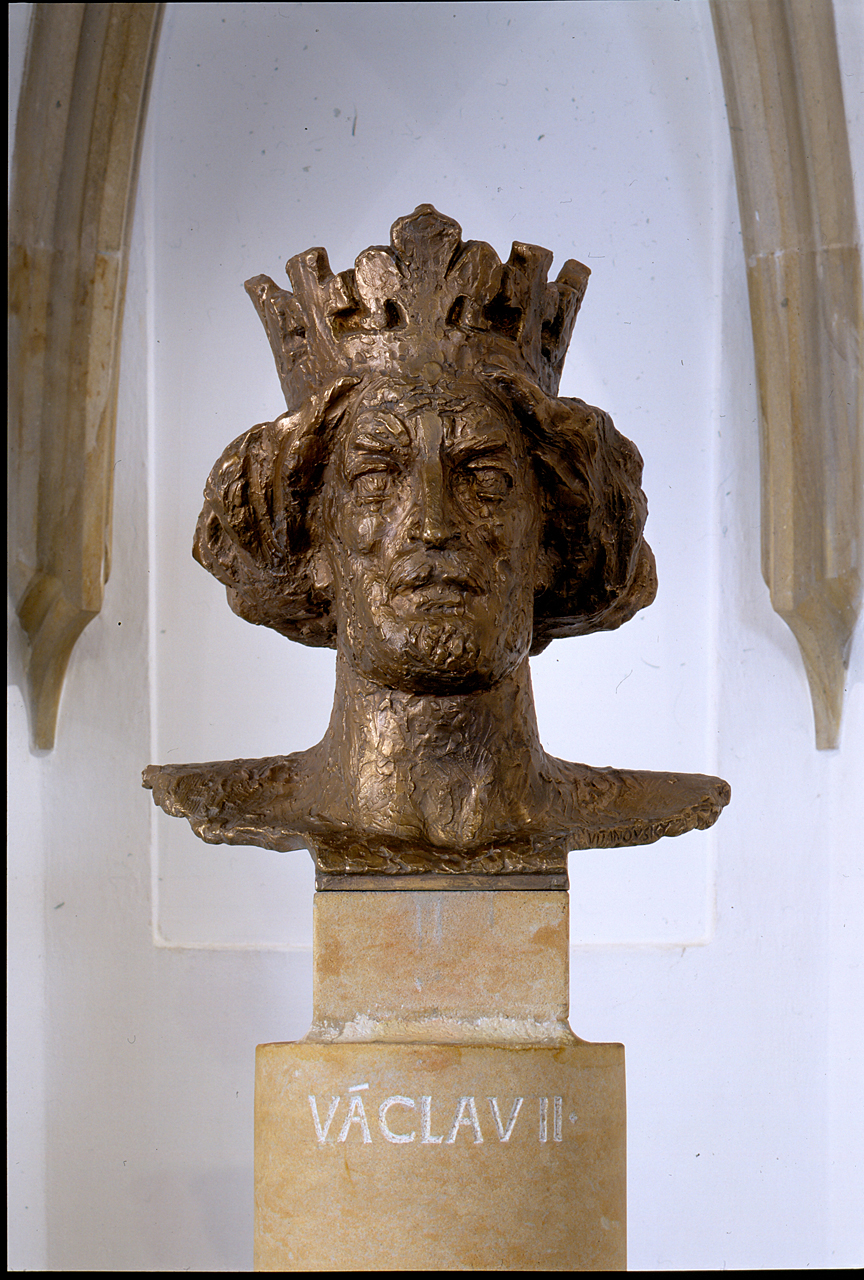
Michal Vitanovský - Wenceslaus II of Bohemia, Vlašský dvůr, Kutná Hora

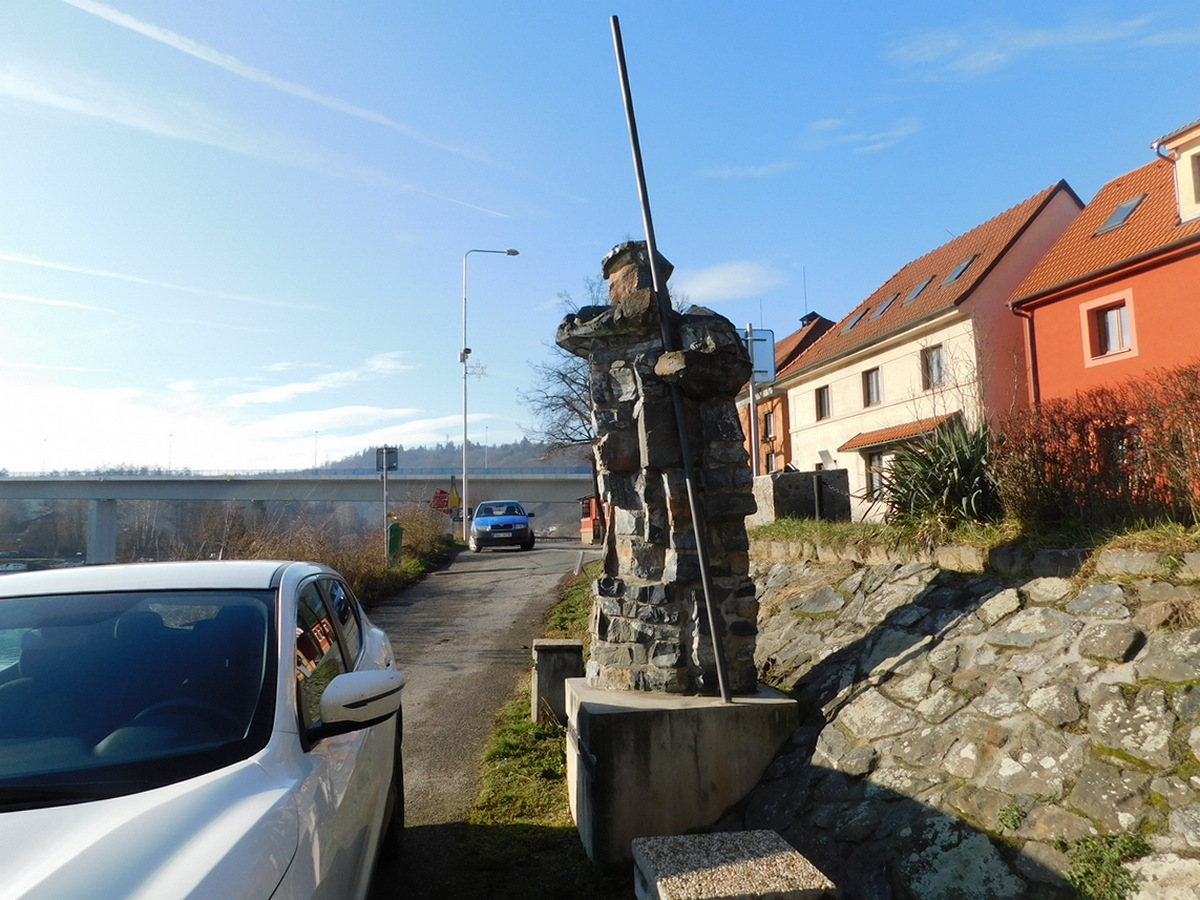
Michal Vitanovský - The Raftsman of Davle

=== Representation in collections (selection) ===
- National Gallery Prague
- National Museum
- Moravian Gallery in Brno
- Moravské zemské muzeum, Brno
- National Museum of Archaeology, History and Art, Luxembourg
- Museum sztuki medalierskiej Wrocław
- NBS - Múzeum mincí a medailí, Kremnica
- United States Holocaust Memorial Museum, Washington, D.C.
- Prague City Gallery
- Gallery of Fine Arts in Cheb
- Museuum of Art Olomouc
- Gallery of Fine Arts in Náchod
- Museum of Eastern Bohemia, Hradec Králové
- Museum of Karlovy Vary

=== Solo exhibitions (selection) ===
- 1973 – Michal Vitanovský: Plastiky, Galerie mladých, Mánes, Prague
- 1977 – Michal Vitanovský: Medaile, Okresní galerie Jičín
- 1978 – Michal Vitanovský, Pavel Sivko, Galerie Fronta, Prague 1978
- 1983 – Michal Vitanovský: Medaile, plakety, drobná plastika 1968 - 1983, Česká numismatická společnost, Hradec Králové
- 1984 – Michal Vitanovský: Medaile, plakety a drobné plastiky z let 1968 - 1983, Okresní galerie výtvarného umění, Náchod
- 1988 – Michal Vitanovský: Medaile a plakety s historickými a hornickými náměty, Okresní muzeum, Kladno
- 1989 – Michal Vitanovský: Velké postavy českých dějin, Jihomoravské muzeum, Znojmo
- 1990 – Michal Vitanovský: Medaile a plakety, Karlovarské muzeum, Karlovy Vary
- 1994 – Michal Vitanovský: Osobnosti českých dějin, Pražský hrad, Lobkovický palác, Prague
- 1995 – Michal Vitanovský: Osobnosti českých dějin (medaile a plakety), Městské muzeum Čáslav
- 1998 – Michal Vitanovský: České dějiny na medailích a plaketách, Státní knihovna, Prague
- 2003 – Michal Vitanovský: Mince, Biskupská mincovna, Kroměříž
- 2006 – Senát a historický kontext české státnosti v díle Michala Vitanovského, Senát ČR
- 2006 – Michal Vitanovský - retrospektiva, křížová chodba Strahovského kláštera
- 2008 – Michal Vitanovský: Praha - Kremnica a späť, Výstavní kabinet numizmatické expozice v NBS-MMM, Kremnica
- 2009 – Michal Vitanovský: Ražené medaile, vyznamenání an insignie, Evropská numismatická asociace a UPM, Prague 2009
- 2010 – Michal Vitanovský: Komorní formáty 2000 – 2010, Galerie u lávky, Prague-Troja,
- 2011 – Michal Vitanovský: Evropské kontury českých dějin – medaile a plakety, Galerie 172, Klatovy
- 2026 – Michal Vitanovský: Reliéfy, kresby, texty, Galerie U lávky, Prague

== Sources ==
- Josef Prokop: Michal Vitanovský - Plastiky / Sculptures, Youth Gallery, Mánes, Prague 1973
- Josef Prokop: Michal Vitanovský, District Gallery in Jičín 1977
- Mladí čeští sochaři / Young Czech sculptors, Odeon, Prague 1978
- Věra Němečková: Michal Vitanovský - medaile, plakety, drobná plastika / medals, plaques, small sculptures, cat. Severografia Turnov 1983
- Medaile a plaketa / Medal and Plaque, Odeon, Prague 1984 (cs, de)
- Helena Štroblová, Tomáš Hladík: Michal Vitanovský - plastiky, medaile / sculptures, medals, Prague, 1986
- Michal Vitanovský, Velké postavy českých dějin (medaile, plastiky, kresby) / Great Figures of Czech History (medals, sculptures, drawings), exhibition calague, South Moravian Museum in Znojmo 1989
- Michal Vitanovský: Medaile a plakety / Medals and Plaques, Museum of Karlovy Vary 1990
- Lipany poprvé / Lipany for the first time, exh. cat., Mladá fronta Gallery, Prague 1991
- Československé bankovky, státovky a mince 1919–1992 / Czechoslovak Banknotes, State Notes, and Coins, 1919–1992, Lunarion, Prague 1993
- Jarmila Hásková: Michal Vitanovský - Osobnosti českých dějin, medaile, plakety, mince, insignie / Notable figures in Czech history, medals, plaques, coins, insignia, National Museum in Prague 1994
- Václav Procházka: Michal Vitanovský - fenomén českého současného medailérství / The Phenomenon of Contemporary Czech Medal Art, Numismatické listy 51, 1996, p. 154-162
- Juliana Boublíková-Jahnová: Michal Vitanovský – A Retrospect, The Medal 35, 1999, p. 79-86
- Naďa Vitanovská: Michal Vitanovský - Mince / Coins, Biskupská mincovna, Kroměříž 2003
- Juliana Boublíková-Jahnová: Michal Vitanovský - Medaile, mince, insignie, plastiky / Medals, Coins, Insignia, Sculptures, author's catalogue 2006
- Naďa Hrůzová: Michal Vitanovský, Malá umělecká edice; vol. 28, Regulus, Prague 2011, ISBN 978-80-86279-99-2

=== Encyclopedias ===
- Ralph Hübner (ed.), WHO IS...? (in Czech Republic) 2004, p. 1430-1431, 2006, p. 1672, 2007, no. 2 (p. 64-67)
- Juliana Boublíková-Jahnová: Michal Vitanovský, in: Anděla Horová (ed.), Nová encyklopedie českého výtvarného umění – dodatky / The New Encyclopedia of Czech Fine Arts – Supplements, p. 826., Publishing House of the Czech Academy of Sciences Academia 2006, ISBN 80-200-1209-5
- Haimann, Petr, Vitanovský Michal (eds.), Slovník autorů a zhotovitelů mincí, medailí, plaket, vyznamenání an odznaků se vztahem k Čechám, Moravě, Slezsku a Slovensku (1505 – 2005) /Dictionary of Designers and Makers of Coins, Medals, Plaques, Decorations, and Badges Related to Bohemia, Moravia, Silesia, and Slovakia (1505–2005), Libri, Prague, 2006, p. 510 - 512
- Petr Pavliňák (ed.), Slovník českých a slovenských výtvarných umělců / Dictionary of Czech and Slovak Visual Artists 20, 2009, p. 42-43, Chagall Art Center, Ostrava, ISBN 978-80-86171-29-6
- Lubomír Slavíček (ed.), Slovník historiků umění, výtvarných kritiků, teoretiků a publicistů v českých zemích a jejich spolupracovníků z příbuzných oborů (asi 1800–2008) / A Dictionary of Art Historians, Art Critics, Art Theorists, and Art Journalists in the Czech Lands and Their Colleagues in Related Fields (c. 1800–2008), Vol. 2, p. 1611, Academia, Prague 2016, ISBN 978-80-200-2094-9
