= Saint Adalbert =

Saint Adalbert may refer to:

- St. Adalbert of Prague (c. 956–997), Bishop of Prague, martyred in his effort to convert the Baltic Prussians to Christianity
- St. Adalbert of Magdeburg (c. 910–981), known as the "Apostle of the Slavs", the first Archbishop of Magdeburg
- St. Adalbert of Egmond, or "Adelbert of Egmond" (died in the first half of the 8th century AD), Northumbrian Anglo-Saxon missionary
- St. Adalbard (Adalbert I of Ostrevent, died 652), founder of Marchiennes Abbey and husband of St. Rictrude
- Saint-Adalbert, Quebec, a municipality in Quebec, Canada
- Basilica of St. Adalbert (Grand Rapids, Michigan)

== See also ==
- Adalbert
