= Saint Methodius =

Saint Methodius may refer to:

- Saint Methodius of Olympus (d. 311), Christian bishop, church father, and martyr
- Saint Methodios I of Constantinople (c. 790–847), patriarch of Constantinople
- Saint Methodius of Thessaloniki (826–885), Byzantine Greek archbishop of Moravia and scholar

== See also ==
- Methodius (disambiguation)
