= Commemorative coins of the Czech Republic =

The Czech National Bank issues 200 / 500 Koruna (Kč) silver commemorative coins and golden commemorative coins of various denominations. The golden coins are issued in thematic sets – Bohemian crown set, Charles IV set, Ten centuries of architecture set, Industrial Heritage Sites set and Bridges in the Czech Republic set. In 1999 the special 2000 Kč silver coin with golden inlay and hologram was issued. In 2019, to commemorate the 100th anniversary of Czechoslovak koruna, a heavyweight gold coin weighing 130 kg was issued as well as a commemorative one-hundred crown banknote.

== Specifications ==
Silver 200 Kc face value coins. (Issued from 1993 to 2010)

- diameter: 31 mm, thickness: about 2.3 mm, weight: 13 g
- purity: 900/1000 Ag 100/1000 Cu
- border proof : imprint "ČESKÁ NÁRODNÍ BANKA * Ag 0.900 * 13 g *"

Silver 200 Kc face value coins. (Issued from 2011)

- diameter: 31 mm, thickness: about 2.3 mm, weight: 13 g
- purity: 925/1000 Ag 75/1000 Cu
- border proof : imprint "ČESKÁ NÁRODNÍ BANKA * Ag 0.925 * 13 g *"

Silver 500 Kc face value coins. (Issued from 2011)

- diameter: 40 mm, thickness: about 2.6 mm, weight: 25 g
- purity: 925/1000 Ag 75/1000 Cu
- border proof : imprint "ČESKÁ NÁRODNÍ BANKA * Ag 0.925 * 25 g *"

Gold 1 000 Kc face value

- diameter: 16 mm, weight: 3,111 g
- purity: 999,9/1000 Au

Gold 2 000 Kc face value, Ten centuries of architecture

- diameter: 20 mm, weight: 6,22 g
- purity: 999,9/1000 Au

Gold 2 500 Kc face value, Industrial Heritage Sites

- diameter: 22 mm, weight: 7,777 g, thickness: 1,45 mm
- purity: 999,9/1000 Au

Gold 5 000 Kc face value

- diameter: 28 mm, weight: 15,55 g
- purity: 999,9/1000 Au

Gold 10 000 Kc face value

- diameter: 34 mm, weight: 31,107 g
- purity: 999,9/1000 Au

Most are made in PROOF and BU versions.

== The Czech gold commemorative coin sets ==
All proof coins have plain edge and all BU have milled edge.

=== Castles in the Czech Republic ===
Ten gold coins issued from 2016 to 2020. All have the face value of 5 000 Kč.

Denomination Motif	Date of issue Decree No.	Fineness Diameter Thickness	Weight fine gross	Normal quality mintage Edge	Proof quality mintage Edge	Designer	Mint
5000 Kč Buchlov Castle	6.10.2020						
5000 Kč Bečov nad Teplou Castle	26.5.2020						
5000 Kč Švihov Castle	1 October 2019 237/2019 Coll.	999.9 28 mm 2 mm	1/2 oz 15.55 g	limit 3,200 pcs milled	limit 7,000 pcs plain	Luboš Charvát	Czech Mint
5000 Kč Veveří Castle	28. 5. 2019; 127/2019 Coll.	999.9 28 mm 2 mm	1/2 oz 15.55 g	limit 2,900 pcs milled	limit 6,900 pcs plain	Asamat Baltaev	Czech Mint
5000 Kč Rabí Castle	18. 9. 2018; 198/2018 Coll	999.9 28 mm 2 mm	1/2 oz 15.55 g	limit 3,100 pcs milled	limit 7,300 pcs plain	Asamat Baltaev	Czech Mint
5000 Kč Zvikov Castle	29. 5. 2018; 55/2018 Coll.	999.9 28 mm 2 mm	1/2 oz 15.55 g	limit 3,200 pcs milled	limit 7,600 pcs plain	Luboš Charvát	Czech Mint
5000 Kč Pernštejn Castle	24. 10. 2017; 332/2017 Coll.	999.9 28 mm 2 mm	1/2 oz 15.55 g	limit 3,300 pcs milled	limit 7,800 pcs plain	Luboš Charvát	Czech Mint
5000 Kč Bouzov Castle	30. 5. 2017; 119/2017 Coll.	999.9 28 mm 2 mm	1/2 oz 15.55 g	limit 3,000 pcs milled	limit 7,400 pcs plain	Josef Oplištil	Czech Mint
5000 Kč Bezděz Castle	25. 10. 2016; 265/2016 Coll.	999.9 28 mm 2 mm	1/2 oz 15.55 g	limit 2,800 pcs milled	limit 7,100 pcs plain	Asamat Baltaev	Czech Mint
5000 Kč Kost Castle	31. 5. 2016; 109/2016 Coll.	999.9 28 mm 2 mm	1/2 oz 15.55 g	limit 3,200 pcs milled	limit 8,200 pcs plain	Zbyněk Fojtů	Czech Mint

=== Bridges in the Czech Republic ===
Issued from 2011 from to 2015. All have got face value 5 000 Kc.

Denomination Motif	Date of issue Decree No.	Fineness Diameter Thickness	Weight fine gross	Normal quality mintage Edge	Proof quality mintage Edge	Designer	Mint
5000 Kč Mariánský bridge in Ústí nad Labem	13. 10. 2015; 260/2015 Coll.	999.9 28 mm 2 mm	1/2 oz 15.55 g	limit 2,500 pcs milled	limit 7,200 pcs plain	Vojtěch Dostál	Czech Mint
5000 Kč Žďákov arch bridge	5. 5. 2015; 90/2015 Coll.	999.9 28 mm 2 mm	1/2 oz 15.55 g	limit 2,100 pcs milled	limit 7,000 pcs plain	Luboš Charvát	Czech Mint
5000 Kč Bridge at Karviná-Darkov	14. 10. 2014; 213/2014 Coll.	999.9 28 mm 2 mm	1/2 oz 15.55 g	limit 1,700 pcs milled	limit 6,500 pcs plain	Asamat Baltaev	Czech Mint
5000 Kč Jizera railway bridge on the Tanvald-Harrachov railroad	13. 5. 2014; 79/2014 Coll.	999.9 28 mm 2 mm	1/2 oz 15.55 g	imit 1,800 pcs milled	limit 6,800 pcs plain	sculptor Vladimír Pavlica	Czech Mint
5000 Kč Žampach viaduct	8. 10. 2013; 320/2013 Coll.	999.9 28 mm 2 mm	1/2 oz 15.55 g	limit 2,200 pcs milled	limit 9,700 pcs plain	sculptor Zbyněk Fojtů	Czech Mint
5000 Kč Lenora wooden bridge	28. 5. 2013; 121/2013 Coll.	999.9 28 mm 2 mm	1/2 oz 15.55 g	limit 2,600 pcs milled	limit 11,300 pcs plain	sculptor Miroslav Hric	Czech Mint
5000 Kč Negrelli viaduct in Prague	13. 11. 2012; 366/2012 Coll.	999.9 28 mm 2 mm	1/2 oz 15.55 g	limit 3,900 pcs milled	limit 12,200 pcs plain	sculptor Zbyněk Fojtů	Czech Mint
5000 Kč Náměšť nad Oslavou bridge	15. 5. 2012; 113/2012 Coll.	999.9 28 mm 2 mm	1/2 oz 15.55 g	limit 3,200 pcs milled	limit 9,000 pcs plain	Martin Dašek	Czech Mint
5000 Kč Stříbro bridge	11. 10. 2011; 292/2011 Coll	999.9 28 mm 2 mm	1/2 oz 15.55 g	limit 2,700 pcs milled	limit 7,300 pcs plain	sculptor Zbyněk Fojtů	Czech Mint
5000 Kč Písek stone bridge	25. 5. 2011; 127/2011 Coll.	999.9 28 mm 2 mm	1/2 oz 15.55 g	limit 2,600 pcs milled	limit 6,900 pcs plain	sculptor Zbyněk Fojtů	Czech Mint

=== Industrial Heritage Sites ===
Issued from 2006 to 2010. All have got face value 2 500 Kc.

Denomination Motif	Date of issue Decree No.	Fineness Diameter Thickness	Weight fine gross	Normal quality mintage Edge	Proof quality mintage Edge	Mintage limit	Designer	Mint
2 500 Kč National Heritage Site - Michal Mine	6.10.2010 271/2010 Coll.	999.9 22 mm 1.6 mm	1/4 oz 7.78 g	actual 3800 pcs milled	actual 9200 pcs plain	13000	sculptor Zbyněk Fojtů	Czech Mint
2 500 Kč Heritage Site - Hammer Mill at Dobřív	5.5.2010 116/2010 Coll.	999.9 22 mm 1.55 mm	1/4 oz 7.78 g	actual 3800 pcs milled	actual 10200 pcs plain	14000	sculptor Jaroslav Veselák	Czech Mint
2 500 Kč Heritage Site - Windmill at Ruprechtov	7.10.2009 263/2009 Coll.	999.9 22 mm 1.7 mm	1/4 oz 7.78 g	actual 3500 pcs milled	actual 10500 pcs plain	14000	sculptor Jiří Harcuba	Czech Mint
2 500 Kč Heritage Site - Elbe Sluice under Střekov Castle	20.5.2009 123/2009 Coll.	999.9 22 mm 1.6 mm	1/4 oz 7.78 g	actual 3500 pcs milled	actual 10500 pcs plain	14000	Josef Oplištil	Czech Mint
2 500 Kč Heritage Site - Brewery at Plzeň	8.10.2008 284/2008 Coll.	999.9 22 mm 1.6 mm	1/4 oz 7.78 g	actual 3200 pcs milled	actual 10800 pcs plain	14000	sculptor Zbyněk Fojtů	Czech Mint
2 500 Kč National Heritage Site - Stádlec Suspension Bridge	14.5.2008 144/2008 Coll.	999.9 22 mm 1.6 mm	1/4 oz 7.78 g	actual 3100 pcs milled	actual 10900 pcs plain	14000	Luboš Charvát	Czech Mint
2 500 Kč National Heritage Site - Slup Water Mill	3.10.2007 204/2007 Coll.	999.9 22 mm 1.5 mm	1/4 oz 7.78 g	actual 2300 pcs milled	actual 6300 pcs plain	8600	sculptor Zbyněk Fojtů	Czech Mint
2 500 Kč Heritage Site - Ševčiny mine at Příbram-Březové Hory	16.5.2007 73/2007 Coll.	999.9 22 mm 1.65 mm	1/4 oz 7.78 g	actual 2100 pcs milled	actual 5100 pcs plain	7200	Luboš Charvát	Czech Mint
2500 Kč National Heritage Site - Observatory at Prague Klementinum	11.10.2006 451/2006 Coll.	999.9 22 mm 1.65 mm	1/4 oz 7.78 g	actual 2100 pcs milled	actual 3800 pcs plain	5900	Josef Oplištil	Czech Mint
2500 Kč National Heritage Site - Paper mill at Velké Losiny	10.5.2006 150/2006 Coll.	999.9 22 mm 1.45 mm	1/4 oz 7.78 g	actual 2000 pcs milled	actual 3000 pcs plain	5000	Luboš Charvát	Czech Mint

=== Ten centuries of architecture ===
Issued from 2001 to 2005. All have got face value 2 000 Kc.

Note: BČM = Bižuterie Česká Mincovna, a.s, Jablonec nad Nisou.

Denomination Motif	Date of issue Decree No.	Fineness Diameter Thickness	Weight fine gross	Normal quality mintage Edge	Proof quality mintage Edge	Mintage limit	Designer	Mint
2000 Kč Contemporary - Dancing House in Prague	20.9.2005 314/2005 Coll.	999.9 20 mm 1.55 mm	1/5 oz 6.22 g	actual 2500 pcs milled	actual 3500 pcs plain	6000	sculptor Vladimír Oppl	Czech Mint (BČM)
2000 Kč Cubism - Spa building in Lázně Bohdaneč	20.4.2005 115/2005 Coll.	999.9 20 mm 1.5 mm	1/5 oz 6.22 g	actual 2500 pcs milled	actual 3500 pcs plain	6000	sculptor Jiří Věneček	Czech Mint (BČM)
2000 Kč Neo-Gothic - Hluboká Castle	8.9.2004 459/2004 Coll.	999.9 20 mm 1.55 mm	1/5 oz 6.22 g	actual 2500 pcs milled	actual 3500 pcs plain	6000	sculptor Jiří Věneček	Czech Mint (BČM)
2000 Kč Empire - Kačina Castle	21.4.2004 130/2004 Coll.	999.9 20 mm 1.6 mm	1/5 oz 6.22 g	actual 2500 pcs milled	actual 3500 pcs plain	6000	Josef Oplištil	Czech Mint (BČM)
2000 Kč Baroque - Buchlovice Castle	24.9.2003 275/2003 Coll.	999.9 20 mm 1.55 mm	1/5 oz 6.22 g	actual 2500 pcs milled	actual 3300 pcs plain	6000	Jakub Vlček	Czech Mint (BČM)
2000 Kč Late Renaissance - House gables in Slavonice	23.4.2003 80/2003 Coll.	999.9 20 mm 1.55 mm	1/5 oz 6.22 g	actual 2500 pcs milled	actual 3500 pcs plain	6000	sculptor Jiří Harcuba	Czech Mint (BČM)
2000 Kč Renaissance - Litomyšl Castle	25.9.2002 389/2002 Coll.	999.9 20 mm 1.5 mm	1/5 oz 6.22 g	actual 2500 pcs milled	actual 3300 pcs plain	5800	sculptor Jiří Věneček	Czech Mint (BČM)
2000 Kč High Gothic- Fountain in Kutná Hora	20.3/2002 84/2002 Coll	999.9 20 mm 1.4 mm	1/5 oz 6.22 g	actual 2500 pcs milled	actual 3300 pcs plain	5800	Josef Oplištil	Czech Mint (BČM)
2000 Kč Early Gothic - Vyšší Brod monastery	26.9.2001 309/2001 Coll.	999.9 20 mm 1.4 mm	1/5 oz 6.22 g	actual 2500 pcs milled	actual 3300 pcs plain	5800	sculptor Michal Vitanovský	Czech Mint (BČM)
2000 Kč Romanesque - Rotunda in Znojmo	21.3.2001 76/2001 Coll.	999.9 20 mm 1.4 mm	1/5 oz 6.22 g	actual 2500 pcs milled	actual 3000 pcs plain	5500	sculptor Jiří Harcuba	Czech Mint (BČM)

=== Charles IV set ===
Emission dates were 18.3.1998 and 24.2.1999. Mintage was 6000 for each emission.

Note: BČM = Bižuterie Česká Mincovna, a.s, Jablonec nad Nisou.

Denomination Motif	Fineness Diameter Thickness	Weight fine gross	Date of issue Decree No.	Normal quality mintage Edge	Proof quality mintage Edge	Designer	Mint
1000 Kč Founding of the Karlštejn castle in 1348	999.9 16 mm 1.35 mm	1/10 oz 3.111 g	18.3.1998 36/1998 Coll.	actual 2200 pcs milled	actual 2210 pcs plain	sculptor Jiří Harcuba	Czech Mint (BČM)
1000 Kč Founding of the Karlštejn castle in 1348	999.9 16 mm 1.35 mm	1/10 oz 3.111 g	24.2.1999 36/1998 Coll.	-	actual 2000 pcs plain	sculptor Jiří Harcuba	Czech Mint (BČM)
2500 Kč Issue of the Bohemian Crown legal documents in 1348	999.9 22 mm 1.65 mm	1/4 oz 7.777 g	18.3.1998 37/1998 Coll.	actual 200 pcs milled	actual 2000 pcs plain	sculptor Jarmila Truhlíková -Spěváková	Czech Mint (BČM)
2500 Kč Issue of the Bohemian Crown legal documents in 1348	999.9 22 mm 1.65 mm	1/4 oz 7.777 g	24.2.1999 37/1998 Coll.	-	actual 1500 pcs plain	sculptor Jarmila Truhlíková -Spěváková	Czech Mint (BČM)
5000 Kč Founding of the Charles University in 1348	999.9 28 mm 1.9 mm	1/2 oz 15.553 g	18.3.1998 38/1998 Coll.	actual 2000 pcs milled	actual 2000 pcs plain	sculptor Michal Vitanovský	Czech Mint (BČM)
5000 Kč Founding of the Charles University in 1348	999.9 28 mm 1.9 mm	1/2 oz 15.553 g	24.2.1999 38/1998 Coll.	-	actual 1500 pcs plain	sculptor Michal Vitanovský	Czech Mint (BČM)
10000 Kč Founding of Prague's New Town in 1348	999.9 34 mm 2.85 mm	1 oz 31.107 g	18.3.1998 39/1998 Coll.	actual 2000 pcs milled	actual 2000 pcs plain	sculptor Vladimír Oppl	Czech Mint (BČM)
10000 Kč Founding of Prague's New Town in 1348	999.9 34 mm 2.85 mm	1 oz 31.107 g	24.2.1999 39/1998 Coll.	-	actual 1300 pcs plain	sculptor Vladimír Oppl	Czech Mint (BČM)

=== Bohemian crown set ===
Emission dates was 4.10.1995, 27.3.1996 and 2.4.1997.

Note: BČM = Bižuterie Česká Mincovna, a.s, Jablonec nad Nisou.

Denomination Motif	Fineness Diameter Thickness	Weight fine gross	Date of issue Decree No.	Normal quality mintage Edge	Proof quality mintage Edge	Mintage	Designer	Mint
1000 Kč Three-ducat of the Silesian Estates from 1621	999.9 16 mm 1.1 mm	1/10 oz 3.111 g	4.10.1995 156/1995 Coll.	actual 2000 pcs milled	-	2000	sculptor Vladimír Oppl	Czech Mint (BČM)
1000 Kč Three-ducat of the Silesian Estates from 1621	999.9 16 mm 1.1 mm	1/10 oz 3.111 g	27.3.1996 156/1995 Coll.	actual 3256 pcs milled	actual 744 pcs plain	4000	sculptor Vladimír Oppl	Czech Mint (BČM)
1000 Kč Three-ducat of the Silesian Estates from 1621	999.9 16 mm 1.1 mm	1/10 oz 3.111 g	2.4.1997 156/1995 Coll.	-	actual 2250 pcs plain	3000	sculptor Vladimír Oppl	Czech Mint (BČM)
2500 Kč Thaler of the Moravian Estates from 1620	999.9 22 mm 1.45 mm	1/4 oz 7.777 g	4.10.1995 157/1995 Coll.	actual 2000 pcs milled	-	2000	sculptor Vladimír Oppl	Czech Mint (BČM)
2500 Kč Thaler of the Moravian Estates from 1620	999.9 22 mm 1.45 mm	1/4 oz 7.777 g	27.3.1996 157/1995 Coll.	actual 1256 pcs milled	actual 744 pcs plain	2000	sculptor Vladimír Oppl	Czech Mint (BČM)
2500 Kč Thaler of the Moravian Estates from 1620	999.9 22 mm 1.45 mm	1/4 oz 7.777 g	2.4.1997 157/1995 Coll.	-	actual 1700 pcs plain	3000	sculptor Vladimír Oppl	Czech Mint (BČM)
5000 Kč Small groschen from 1587	999.9 28 mm 1.75 mm	1/2 oz 15.553 g	4.10.1995 158/1995 Coll.	actual 1000 pcs milled	-	1000	sculptor Vladimír Oppl	Czech Mint (BČM)
5000 Kč Small groschen from 1587	999.9 28 mm 1.75 mm	1/2 oz 15.553 g	27.3.1996 158/1995 Coll.	actual 1256 pcs milled	actual 744 pcs plain	2000	sculptor Vladimír Oppl	Czech Mint (BČM)
5000 Kč Small groschen from 1587	999.9 28 mm 1.75 mm	1/2 oz 15.553 g	2.4.1997 158/1995 Coll.	-	actual 1500 pcs plain	2000	sculptor Vladimír Oppl	Czech Mint (BČM)
10000 Kč Pragergroschen	999.9 34 mm 2.3 mm	1 oz 31.107 g	4.10.1995 159/1995 Coll.	actual 1000 pcs milled	-	1000	sculptor Jiří Harcuba	Czech Mint (BČM)
10000 Kč Pragergroschen	999.9 34 mm 2.3 mm	1 oz 31.107 g	27.3.1996 159/1995 Coll.	actual 1256 pcs milled	actual 744 pcs plain	2000	sculptor Jiří Harcuba	Czech Mint (BČM)
10000 Kč Pragergroschen	999.9 34 mm 2.3 mm	1 oz 31.107 g	2.4.1997 159/1995 Coll.	-	actual 1500 pcs plain	2000	sculptor Jiří Harcuba	Czech Mint (BČM)

=== Special editions ===
Denomination Motif	Date of issue Decree No.	Fineness Diameter Thickness	Weight fine gross	Normal quality mintage Edge	Proof quality mintage Edge	Designer	Mint
10000 Kč Introduction of the Czechoslovak currency	5. 3. 2019; 63/2019 Coll.	999,9 34 mm 2.35 mm	1 oz 31.107 g	limit 3,200 pcs milled	limit 6,900 pcs plain	Josef Oplištil	Czech Mint
10000 Kč Foundation of Czechoslovakia	23. 10. 2018; 224/2018 Coll.	999,9 34 mm 2.60 mm	1 oz 31.107 g	limit 3,800 pcs milled	limit 8,200 pcs plain	Vladimír Pavlica	Czech Mint
10000 Kč 600th anniversary of Jan Hus being burnt at the stake	3. 7. 2015; 138/2015 Coll	999,9 34 mm 2.45 mm	1 oz 31.107 g	limit 2.100 pcs milled	limit 6,300 pcs plain	Jakub Orava	Czech Mint
10000 Kč Arrival of missionaries Constantine and Methodius	3. 7. 2013; 183/2013 Coll.	999,9 34 mm 2.5 mm	1 oz 31.107 g	limit 2,000 pcs milled	limit 9,000 pcs plain / inscription (193 pcs)	Vladimír Pavlica	Czech Mint
10000 Kč Golden Bull of Sicily	26. 9. 2012; 300/2012 Coll.	999,9 34 mm 2.55 mm	1 oz 31.107 g	limit 3,100 pcs milled	limit 10,900 pcs plain	Jaroslav Bejvl	Czech Mint

=== Heavyweight gold coin ===
Denomination Motif	Date of issue Decree No.	Fineness Diameter Thickness	Weight	Normal quality mintage Edge	Designer	Mint
100 000 000 Kč 100 years of Czechoslovak koruna	31. 1. 2019; 21/2019 Coll.	999.9 535 mm 48 mm	130 kg	1 pc milled	Vladimír Oppl	Czech Mint, Münze Österreich AG

Commemorative banknotes

Denomination Motif	Date of issue Decree No.	Length x Width	Mintage	Designer	Printing Works
100 Kč 2019 100 years of Czechoslovak koruna	31. 1. 2019; 20/2019 Coll.	194 x 84 mm	limit 20,000 pcs	Eva Hašková	State Printing Works of Securities, Prague

== The Czech silver 200 Kc commemorative coins ==
=== 1993 - 2009 ===
- 1st anniversary of the adoption of the Constitution of the Czech Republic – 1993
- 650th anniversary of the foundation of the Prague Archbishopric and laying of the cornerstone of St.Vitus Cathedral – 1994
- 50th anniversary of the Allied Landings in Normandy – 1994
- 125th anniversary of the horse-drawn tram in Brno – 1994
- Protection of the environment – 1994
- Czech introduction to the euro – 2001
- 150th anniversary birth of Mikoláš Aleš – 2002
- Jaroslav Vrchlický – 2003
- Skiers Union centennial – 2003
- 150th anniversary birth of Leoš Janáček – 2004
- 250th anniversary Lightning Conductor – 2004
- Czech EU accession – 2004
- 425th anniversary of the Kralická Bible – 2004
- 100 years of automobile – 2005
- Birth of Jan Werich/Jiří Voskovec – 2005
- Foundation of Unity of the Brethren (Unitas Fratrum) – 2007
- Entry into the Schengen Area – 2008
- 100. Death of Josef Hlávka – 2008
- 650. Foundation of vineyards by Charles the IV. – 2008
- 150. Birth of Viktor Ponrepo – 2008
- 100. Founding of National technical Museum – 2008
- Czech presidency of European Union – 2009
- World championship in classical ski – 2009
- 100 years of reaching the North pole – 2009
- 400 years from death of Rabí Jehuda Löw – 2009
- 400 years from formulation of first two Keppler's laws – 2009
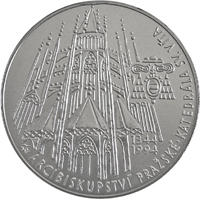
200 Kč Obverse from 1994

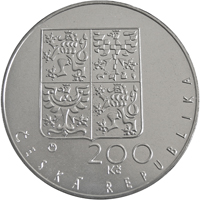
200 Kč Reverse from 1994

=== 2010 - current ===
Denomination Motif	Date of issue Decree No.	Metal Weight Diameter and Thickness	Normal quality: Mintage Edge	Proof quality: Mintage Edge	Designer	Mint
200 Kč 600th anniversary of the First Defenestration of Prague	24. 7. 2019; 152/2019 Coll.	925 Ag 75 Cu 13 g 31 mm and 2.30 mm	limit 5,500 pcs milled	limit 10,700 pcs plain with an inscriptionnn	Majka Wichnerová	Czech Mint
500 Kč 100th anniversary of the first issue of Czechoslovak money	3. 7. 2019; 151/2019 Coll.	925 Ag 75 Cu 25 g 40 mm and 2.65 mm	limit 5,500 pcs milled	limit 10,900 pcs plain with an inscription	Luboš Charvát	Czech Mint
200 Kč 100th anniversary of the Bohemia B-5 plane construction	24. 4. 2019; 108/2019 Coll.	925 Ag 75 Cu 13 g 31 mm and 2.20 mm	limit 5,000 pcs milled	limit 9,400 pcs plain with an inscription	Zbyněk Fojtů	Czech Mint
200 Kč 150th birth anniversary of Aleš Hrdlička	20. 3. 2019; 64/2019 Coll.	925 Ag 75 Cu 13 g 31 mm and 2.30 mm	limit 4,700 pcs milled	limit 8,800 pcs plain with an inscription	Asamat Baltaev	Czech Mint
200 Kč 100th anniversary of the Czecho-slovak Red Cross foundation	6. 2. 2019; 22/2019 Coll.	925 Ag 75 Cu 13 g 31 mm and 2.35 mm	limit 5,900 pcs milled	limit 9,200 pcs plain with an inscription	Asamat Baltaev	Czech Mint
200 Kč 300th death anniversary of Jan Brokoff	12. 12. 2018; 275/2018 Coll.	925 Ag 75 Cu 13 g 31 mm and 2.35 mm	limit 5,300 pcs milled	limit 9,900 pcs plain with an inscription	Asamat Baltaev	Czech Mint
500 Kč 100th anniversary of the Washington Declaration	17. 10. 2018; 223/2018 Coll.	925 Ag 75 Cu 25 g 40 mm a 2.90	limit 5,000 pcs milled	limit 9,700 pcs plain with an inscription	Jakub Orava	Czech Mint
200 Kč 200th anniversary of the National Museum foundation	5. 9. 2018; 146/2018 Coll.	925 Ag 75 Cu 13 g 31 mm and 2.3 mm	limit 5,600 pcs milled	limit 10,600 pcs plain with an inscription	Petr Horák	Czech Mint
200 Kč 500th anniversary of the issuance of the Klaudyán map	28. 2. 2018; 15/2018 Coll.	925 Ag 75 Cu 13 g 31 mm and 2,2 mm	limit 5,800 pcs milled	limit 10,200 pcs plain with an inscription	Zbyněk Fojtů	Czech Mint
200 Kč 100th anniversary of the Czech astronomical society foundation	6. 12. 2017; 393/2017 Coll.	925 Ag 75 Cu 13 g 31 mm and 2,25 mm	limit 5,400 pcs milled	limit 10,400 pcs plain with an inscription	Josef Oplištil	Czech Mint
200 Kč 650th anniversary of the consecration of St Wenceslas Chapel in the St Vitus Cathedral	29. 11. 2017; 377/2017 Coll.	925 Ag 75 Cu 13 g 31 mm and 2,25 mm	limit 5,800 pcs milled	limit 11,600 pcs plain with an inscription	Zbyněk Fojtů	Czech Mint
200 Kč 100th anniversary of the Association of Czech Graphic Artists Hollar	4. 10. 2017; 288/2017 Coll	925 Ag 75 Cu 13 g 31 mm and 2.3 mm	limit 5,300 pcs milled	limit 9,700 pcs plain with an inscription	Asamat Baltaev	Czech Mint
200 Kč 100th birth anniversary of Josef Kainar	14. 6. 2017; 154/2017 Coll.	925 Ag 75 Cu 13 g 31 mm and 2.25 mm	limit 5,500 pcs milled	limit 10,200 pcs plain with an inscription	Vojtěch Dostál	Czech Mint
200 Kč 75th anniversary of Operation Anthropoid	24. 5. 2017; 131/2017 Coll.	925 Ag 75 Cu 13 g 31 mm and 2.2 mm	limit 5,400 pcs milled	limit 11,600 pcs plain with an inscription	Irena Hradecká	Czech Mint
200 Kč 300th birth anniversary of Maria Theresa	26. 4. 2017; 81/2017 Coll.	925 Ag 75 Cu 13 g 31 mm and 2.3 mm	limit 5,600 pcs milled	limit 11,300 pcs plain with an inscription	Vojtěch Dostál	Czech Mint
200 Kč 450th birth anniversary of Jan Jessenius	14. 12. 2016; 389/2016 Coll.	925 Ag 75 Cu 13 g 31 mm and 2.35 mm	limit 5,400 pcs milled	limit 10,000 pcs plain with an inscription	Zbyněk Fojtů	Czech Mint
200 Kč 150th anniversary of the battle of Hradec Králové	29. 6. 2016; 165/2016 Coll.	925 Ag 75 Cu 13 g 31 mm and 2.2 mm	limit 5,300 pcs milled	limit 10,000 pcs plain with an inscription	Roman Shamilyan	Czech Mint
200 Kč 125th anniversary of the General Land Centennial Exhibition	11. 5. 2016; 110/2016 Coll.	925 Ag 75 Cu 13 g 31 mm and 2.25 mm	limit 5,200 pcs milled	limit 9,600 pcs plain with an inscription	Asamat Baltaev	Czech Mint
500 Kč 100th anniversary of Czechoslovak National Council foundation	10. 2. 2016; 30/2016 Coll.	925 Ag 75 Cu 25 g 40 mm a 2.75 mm	limit 4,800 pcs milled	limit 8,600 pcs plain, engraved	Josef Šafařík	Czech Mint
500 Kč 250th birth anniversary of the poet and playwright Václav Thám	21. 10. 2015; 265/2015 Coll.	925 Ag 75 Cu 25 g 40 mm a 2.8 mm	limit 4,900 pcs milled	limit 9,400 pcs plain, engraved	Michal Vitanovský	Czech Mint
200 Kč 200th anniversary of the introduction of the steam car by Josef Božek	6. 9. 2015; 211/2015 Coll.	925 Ag 75 Cu 13 g 31 mm and 2.35 mm	limit 5,500 pcs milled	limit 10,600 pcs plain, engraved	Zbyněk Fojtů (obverse), Martin Dašek (reverse)	Czech Mint
200 Kč 200th birth anniversary of Jan Perner	2. 9. 2015; 210/2015 Coll.	925 Ag 75 Cu 13 g 31 mm and 2.25 mm	limit 5,500 pcs milled	limit 10,600 pcs plain, engraved	Zbyněk Fojtů	Czech Mint
200 Kč 100th anniversary of the deciphering of Hittite by Bedřich Hrozný	3. 6. 2015; 126/2015 Coll	925 Ag 75 Cu 13 g 31 mm and 2.25 mm	limit 5,500 pcs milled	limit 10,600 pcs plain, engraved	Vladimír Pavlica	Czech Mint
200 Kč 750th birth anniversary of České Budějovice	4. 3. 2015; 36/2015 Coll.	925 Ag 75 Cu 13 g 31 mm and 2.3 mm	limit 5,600 pcs milled	limit 10,900 pcs plain, engraved	Zbyněk Fojtů	Czech Mint
200 Kč 25th anniversary of 17 November 1989	12. 11. 2014; 238/2014 Coll.	925 Ag 75 Cu 13 g 31 mm and 2.2 mm	limit 5,900 pcs milled	limit 14,900 pcs plain, engraved	Jiří Hanuš	Czech Mint
500 Kč 100th birth anniversary of the artist and writer Jiří Kolář	24. 9. 2014; 190/2014 Coll.	925 Ag 75 Cu 25g 40 mm and 2.85 mm	limit 5,100 pcs milled	limit 9,800 pcs plain, engraved	Jiří Věneček (obverse) Martin Dašek (reverse)	Czech Mint
200 Kč 100th birth anniversary of the entrepreneur Tomáš Baťa Jr.	3. 9. 2014; 188/2014 Coll.	925 Ag 75 Cu 13 g 31 mm and 2.35 mm	limit 5,800 pcs milled	limit 12,100 pcs plain, engraved	Vojtěch Dostál	Czech Mint
200 Kč 100th birth anniversary of Czechoslovak legions	6. 8. 2014; 160/2014 Coll.	925 Ag 75 Cu 13 g 31 mm and 2.35 mm	limit 6,000 pcs milled	limit 11,700 pcs plain, engraved	Luboš Charvát	Czech Mint
200 Kč 450th birth anniversary of the Czech nobleman Kryštof Harant z Polžic a Bezdružic	11. 6. 2014; 102/2014 Coll.	925 Ag 75 Cu 13 g 31 mm and 2.35 mm	limit 5,800 pcs milled	limit 11,500 pcs plain, engraved	Vladimír Pavlica	Czech Mint
200 Kč 100th birth anniversary of the writer Bohumil Hrabal	26. 3. 2014; 47/2014 Coll.	925 Ag 75 Cu 13 g 31 mm and 2.35 mm	limit 6,100 pcs milled	limit 11,700 pcs plain, engraved	Vladimír Oppl	Czech Mint
200 Kč 100th birth anniversary of the inventor and chemist Otto Wichterle	23. 10. 2013; 319/2013 Coll.	925 Ag 75 Cu 13 g 31 mm and 2.3 mm	limit 6,700 pcs milled	imit 14,200 pcs plain, engraved	Josef Oplištil	Czech Mint
200 Kč 100th birth anniversary of the soccerplayer Josef Bican	11. 9. 2013; 271/2013 Coll.	925 Ag 75 Cu 13 g 31 mm and 2.3 mm	limit 6,800 pcs milled	limit 14,300 pcs plain, engraved	Petr Horák	Czech Mint
200 Kč 750th anniversary of founding the Zlatá Koruna monastery	19. 6. 2013; 142/2013 Coll.	925 Ag 75 Cu 13 g 31 mm and 2.35 mm	limit 6,900 pcs milled	limit 15,400 pcs plain, engrave	Zbyněk Fojtů	Czech Mint
500 Kč 100th birth anniversary of the opera singer Beno Blachut	5. 6. 2013; 137/2013 Coll.	925 Ag 75 Cu 25 g 40 mm and 2.6 mm	limit 6,600 pcs milled	limit 13,900 pcs plain, engraved	Vojtěch Dostál	Czech Mint
200 Kč 250th birth anniversary of the philologist and philanthropist Aloys Klar	10. 4. 2013; 81/2013 Coll.	925 Ag 75 Cu 13 g 31 mm and 2.2 mm	limit 6,900 pcs milled	limit 15,600 pcs plain, engraved	Branislav Ronai	Czech Mint
200 Kč 20 years of the Czech National Bank and the Czech currency	6. 2. 2013; 23/2013 Coll.	925 Ag 75 Cu 13 g 31 mm and 2.2 mm	limit 7,300 pcs milled	limit 18,700 pcs plain, engraved	Vladimír Oppl	Czech Mint
200 Kč 100th anniversary of the opening of the Municipal House in Prague	7. 11. 2012; 365/2012 Coll.	925 Ag 75 Cu 13 g 31 mm and 2.2 mm	limit 7,700 pcs milled	limit 13,600 pcs plain, engraved	Majka Wichnerová	Czech Mint
200 Kč 100th birth anniversary of the painter Kamil Lhoták	20. 6. 2012; 209/2012 Coll.	925 Ag 75 Cu 13 g 31 mm and 2.2 mm	limit 7,700 pcs milled	limit 13,200 pcs plain, engraved	Tereza Eisnerová	Czech Mint
200 Kč 100th anniversary of Junák	11. 4. 2012; 112/2012 Coll.	925 Ag, 75 Cu 13 g 31 mm and 2.5 mm	limit 8,000 pcs milled	limit 12,200 pcs plain, engraved	Zbyněk Fojtů	Czech Mint
200 Kč 150th anniversary of the Czech Sokol movement	15. 2. 2012; 12/2012 Coll.	925 Ag, 75 Cu 13 g 31 mm and 2.5 mm	limit 8,000 pcs milled	limit 12,200 pcs plain, engraved	Jaroslav Bejvl	Czech Mint
500 Kč 100th birth anniversary of the painter and puppeteer Jiří Trnka	1. 2. 2012; 11/2012 Coll.	925 Ag, 75 Cu 25 g 40 mm and 2.6 mm	limit 6,800 pcs milled	limit 12,100 pcs plain, engraved	Josef Oplištil	Czech Mint
200 Kč 400th death anniversary of Rudolf II	11. 1. 2012; 5/2012 Coll.	925 Ag, 75 Cu 13 g 31 mm and 2.35 mm	limit 8,100 pcs milled	limit 12,600 pcs plain, engraved	Majka Wichnerová	Czech Mint
500 Kč 200th birth anniversary of Karel Jaromír Erben	2. 11. 2011; 296/2011 Coll.	925 Ag, 75 Cu 25 g 40 mm and 2.55 mm	limit 7,300 pcs milled	limit 10,800 pcs plain, engraved	Jaroslav Bejvl	Czech Mint
200 Kč 400th death anniversary of Petr Vok of Rožmberk	19. 10. 2011; 305/2011 Coll.	925 Ag, 75 Cu 13 g 31 mm and 2.35 mm	limit 8,300 pcs milled	limit 12,400 pcs plain, engraved	Jaroslav Bejvl (obverse) Petr Horák (reverse)	Czech Mint
200 Kč 500th birth anniversary of Jiří Melantrich	15. 6. 2011; 159/2011 Coll.	925 Ag, 75 Cu 13 g 31 mm and 2.2 mm	limit 7,900 pcs milled	limit 11,600 pcs plain, engraved	Jan Smrž	Czech Mint
200 Kč 100th anniversary of the first long-distance flight by Jan Kašpar	27. 4. 2010; 99/2011 Coll.	925 Ag, 75 Cu 13 g 31 mm and 2.35 mm	limit 7,800 pcs milled	limit 11,600 pcs plain, engraved	Josef Šafařík	Czech Mint
200 Kč Prague conservatory opened 200 years ago	30. 3. 2010; 58/2011 Coll.	925 Ag, 75 Cu 13 g 31 mm and 2.35 mm	limit 7,800 pcs milled	limit 11,500 pcs plain, engraved	Martin Dašek	Czech Mint
200 Kč 100th birth anniversary of director Karel Zeman	27. 10. 2010; 272/2010 Coll.	900 Ag, 100 Cu 13 g 31 mm and 2.3 mm	limit 9,500 pcs milled	limit 13,200 pcs plain, engraved	Lenka Nebeská	Czech Mint
200 Kč 700th anniversary – John of Luxembourg’s marriage to Elisabeth of Premyslides	1. 9. 2010; 238/2010 Coll.	900 Ag, 100 Cu 13 g 31 mm and 2.35 mm	limit 9,600 pcs milled	limit 13,900 pcs plain, engraved	Jakub Vlček	Czech Mint
200 Kč 150th birth anniversary of painter Alfons Mucha	23. 6. 2010; 182/2010 Coll.	900 Ag, 100 Cu 13 g 31 mm and 2.3 mm	limit 10,300 pcs milled	limit 15,900 pcs plain, engraved	Ivan Řehák	Czech Mint
200 Kč 150th birth anniversary of composer Gustav Mahler	9. 6. 2010; 181/2010 Coll.	900 Ag, 100 Cu 13 g 31 mm and 2.35 mm	limit 10,400 pcs milled	limit 15,400 pcs plain, engraved	Miroslava Česlová, Josef Oplištil	Czech Mint
200 Kč 600th anniversary - Construction of the Astronomical Clock in Prague's Old Town	17. 3. 2010; 34/2010 Coll.	900 Ag, 100 Cu 13 g 31 mm and 2.3 mm	limit 10,800 pcs milled	limit 16,500 pcs plain, engraved	Ivan Řehák	Czech Mint

== The Czech silver 500 Kc commemorative coins ==
Denomination Motif	Date of issue Decree No.	Metal Weight Diameter and Thickness	Normal quality: Mintage Edge	Proof quality: Mintage Edge	Designer	Mint
500 Kč 100th anniversary of adoption of Czechoslovak Constitution	26.2.2020	925 Ag 75 Cu 25 g 40 mm and 2.65 mm				
500 Kč 100th anniversary of the first issue of Czechoslovak currency	3. 7. 2019; 151/2019 Coll.	925 Ag 75 Cu 25 g 40 mm and 2.65 mm	limit 5,500 pcs milled	limit 10,900 pcs plain with an inscription	Luboš Charvát	Czech Mint
500 Kč 100th anniversary of the Washington Declaration	17. 10. 2018; 223/2018 Coll.	925 Ag 75 Cu 25 g 40 mm a 2.90	limit 5,000 pcs milled	limit 9,700 pcs plain with an inscription	Jakub Orava	Czech Mint
500 Kč 100th anniversary of the Battle of Zborov	28. 6. 2017; 169/2017 Coll.	925 Ag 75 Cu 25 g 40 mm a 2.65 mm	limit 5,100 pcs milled	limit 9,400 pcs plain with an inscription	Asamat Baltaev	Czech Mint
500 Kč 100th anniversary Foundation of Czechoslovak National Council	10. 2. 2016; 30/2016 Coll.	925 Ag 75 Cu 25 g 40 mm a 2.75 mm	limit 4,800 pcs milled	limit 8,600 pcs plain, engraved	Josef Šafařík	Czech Mint
500 Kč 250th birth anniversary of the poet and playwright Václav Thám	21. 10. 2015; 265/2015 Coll.	925 Ag 75 Cu 25 g 40 mm a 2.8 mm	limit 4,900 pcs milled	limit 9,400 pcs plain, engrave	Michal Vitanovský	Czech Mint
500 Kč 100th birth anniversary of the artist and writer Jiří Kolář	24. 9. 2014; 190/2014 Coll.	925 Ag 75 Cu 25g 40 mm and 2.85 mm	limit 5,100 pcs milled	limit 9,800 pcs plain, engraved	Jiří Věneček obverse, Martin Dašek reverse	Czech Mint
500 Kč 100th birth anniversary of the opera singer Beno Blachut	5. 6. 2013; 137/2013 Coll.	925 Ag 75 Cu 25 g 40 mm and 2.6 mm	limit 6,600 pcs milled	limit 13,900 pcs plain, engraved	Vojtěch Dostál	Czech Mint
500 Kč 100th birth anniversary of the painter and puppeteer Jiří Trnka	1. 2. 2012; 11/2012 Coll.	925 Ag, 75 Cu 25 g 40 mm and 2.6 mm	limit 6,800 pcs milled	limit 12,100 pcs plain, engrave	Josef Oplištil	Czech Mint
500 Kč 200th birth anniversary of Karel Jaromír Erben	2. 11. 2011; 296/2011 Coll.	925 Ag, 75 Cu 25 g 40 mm and 2.55 mm	limit 7,300 pcs milled	limit 10,800 pcs plain, engraved	Jaroslav Bejvl	Czech Mint

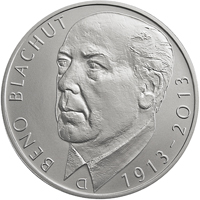
500 Kč Obverse from 2013

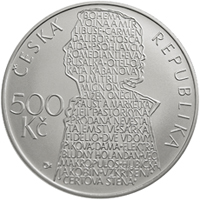
500 Kč Reverse from 2013

== The other Czech commemorative coins ==
Note: BČM = Bižuterie Česká Mincovna, a.s, Jablonec nad Nisou

Denomination Motif	Date of issue Decree No.	Metal Weight Diameter and Thickness	Normal quality: Mintage Edge	Proof quality: Mintage Edge	Designer	Mint
2000 Kč 100th anniversary of the introduction of the Czechoslovak koruna	10.4.2019 96/2019 Coll.	900 Ag, 100 Cu; 986.1 Au 34.593 g 40 mm, 3.2 mm	limit 7,200 pcs plain with a relief inscription		Jiří Hanuš	Czech Mint
2500 Kč The accession of the Czech Republic to the EU	28.4.2004 163/2004 Coll.	999.9 Au, 7.776 g 16 mm 999 Ag 23.328 g 40 mm and 2.8 mm		limit 10,000 pcs plain engraved: ČNB * Ag 0.999 * 23,328 g * Au 999,9 * 7,776 g *	Zbyněk Fojtů	BČM
2000 Kč Coin with a gold inlay and hologram to mark the Year 2000	1/12/1999 241/1999 Coll.	999 Ag, 31,103g 40 mm and 3,4 mm 999,9 Au, 3,111g 16 mm		Version with matt field: limit 17,000 pcs. Version with polished field: limit 3,000 pcs. Plain, engraved)	Otakar Dušek	BČM; Hologram by Czech Holography a.s.

== See also ==
- Commemorative coins of Czechoslovakia
