= Jizera Railway Bridge =

Railway bridge in the Czech Republic

Jizerský most Jizera railway bridge
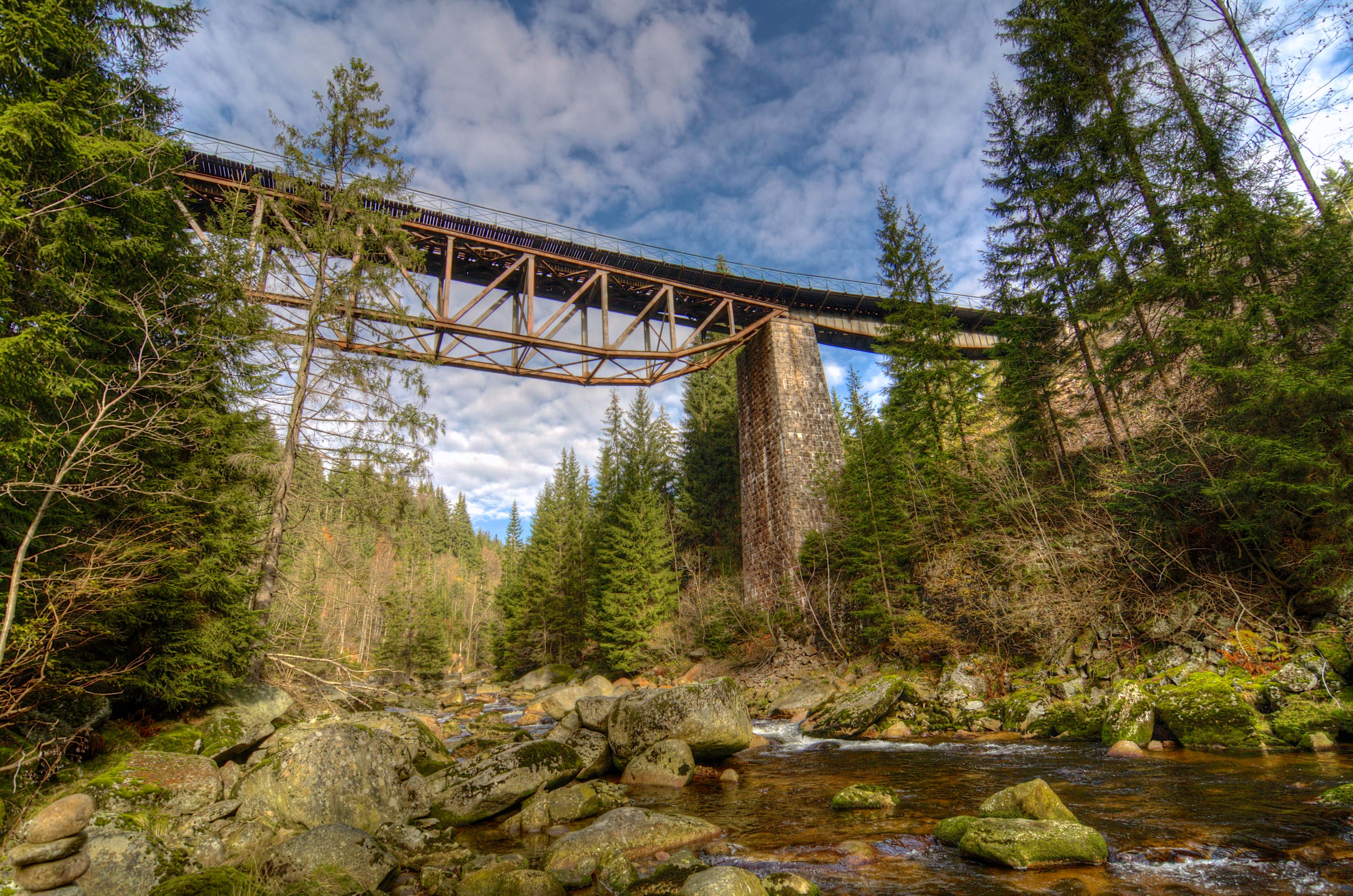
- Jizera Railway Bridge
- Coordinates: 50.7802°N 15.3694°E
- Crosses: Jizera River
- Locale: Kořenov, Tanvald, Czech Republic
- Official name: Jizerský most
- Heritage status: Cultural monument

Characteristics
- Material: Granite, steel
- Total length: 116.25 metres (381.4 ft)
- Height: 25 metres (82 ft)

History
- Construction start: 1902
- Opened: 1902

Location
- Interactive map of Jizerský most Jizera railway bridge

The Jizera railway bridge is a railway bridge on the cog railway line Tanvald-Harrachov in the Czech Republic that was built between 1899 and 1902. Its main purpose was to connect the Liberec and Jablonec regions with western Silesia.

In 1992, the 12 km section between Tanvald and Harrachov was declared a cultural heritage site. It is known as "Kořenov Toothed Rack Rail" (or in Czech also "Polubenka") – and features a unique more than four-kilometer long two-track Abt rack system. The Jizera bridge is the best known construction on this railway line. It consists of a steel construction and brick pillars.

In 2014 the Czech National bank issued a 5000 CZK commemorative gold coin as part of the Bridges in the Czech republic series. The coin was designed by Vladimír Pavlica.

== Description ==
It is a steel bridge towering on granite pillars over the Jizera river. It crosses the valley between the Jizera Mountains and the Giant Mountains. The bridge was built as part of the Hirschberg (now Jelenia Góra) - Grűnthal (later Polubný, now Kořenov) railway line (at that time running on the Prussian territory).

The bridge length is 116.5 m, max height is 25 m, it consists of four fields, the slope of the track is horizontal and there is no rack on the bridge.

== History ==
The railway construction was completed on 1 October 1902. The railway began to operate the passenger transport in steam traction first, the freight transport was added 10 months later. The line was primarily used to run freight trains with Prussian coal. In February 1923, a regular electrical operation began.

The bridge history reflects the history of the railway line in this border area. At the end of World War II the Jizera river became part of the Czechoslovak - Polish border and the train traffic across the border, and thus over the bridge as well, ceased in November 1945.

In 1958, the territory was swapped between Czechoslovakia and Poland and the Harrachov track including the Jizera bridge fell under the management of the Czechoslovak State Railways. On 26 May 1963, the operation has resumed.

In February 1997 the traffic from Kořenov to Harrachov was stopped due to the poor condition of the Jizera Bridge. Although the bridge was repaired at a cost of over a million CZK and was reopened in June 1997, the passenger transport from Tanvald to Harrachov was stopped on 27 September 1997. Freight trains from Kořenov to Harrachov did not run this line at that time and so the Jizerský Bridge remained without traffic.

On 24 May 1998, regular transport was resumed under the auspices of the Jizera Railway and GJW Praha. However, the promising traffic was not of long duration and thus the operation and management of the line returned to České dráhy starting 1 December 1998.

As of 2019, the bridge is owned by the Railway Infrastructure Administration (SŽ, formerly SŽDC). The railway line runs Czech Railways and GW Train Regio trains.
