= Windmill at Ruprechtov =

Windmill in the Czech Republic

- Ruprechtov, South Moravian Region in the Czech Republic
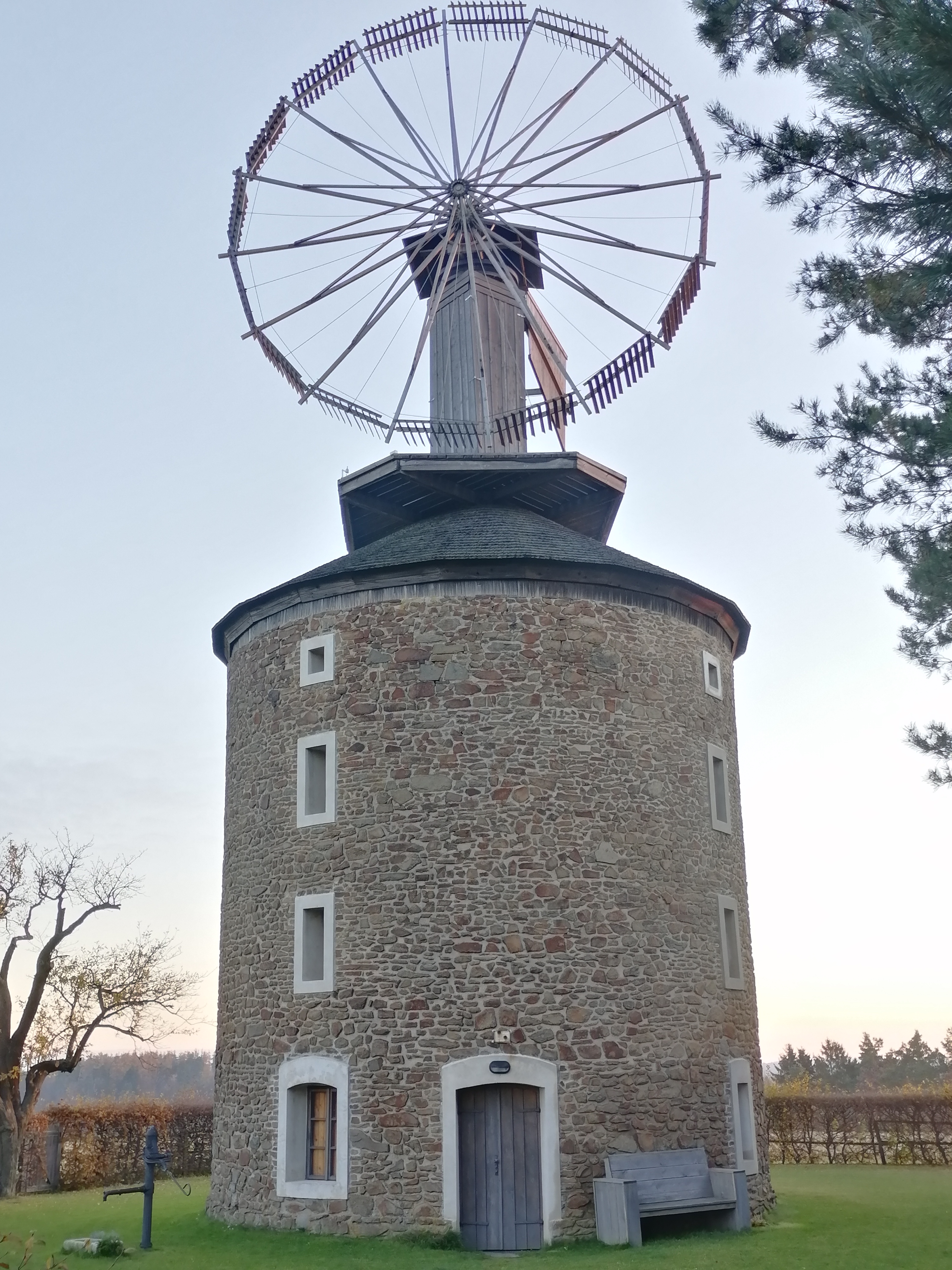
- Windmill at Ruprechtov

Site information
- Type: Windmill

Location
- Coordinates: 49°19′58″N 16°50′53″E

Site history
- Built: 1873

The windmill at Ruprechtov is a technical monument in Ruprechtov in the Czech Republic. It is one of the most important and unique technical monuments in the country from the historical and technical point of view. It is equipped with the Halladay patent turbine, the only machine of this type in the Czech Republic and in Europe.

== History ==
The mill was built in 1873 as a classic Dutch-type mill, with a four-blade wind wheel and a revolving roof. After a windstorm damage, the original owner and builder Cyril Wagner decided to modernize the mill. He installed the so-called Halladay turbine instead of the classic wind wheel. The turbine was named after its inventor and designer, the American farmer Daniel Halladay. The runner consists of a chain of operable vanes controlled by rods, enabling them to be tilted as required automatically according to the wind. Double tail vane maintained the wheel at the right course.

The turbine is now rotating at a height of 16 m above the ground, its diameter is 10 m and it weighs about 2 tons. The mill still has the original mill machines. Even though grinding stopped in the 1960s the roof turbine is still in operation.

The mill was completely restored in 1998 and is open to the public.

== Recognition ==
It was declared a Czech cultural monument in 1958.

In autumn 2009, a postage stamp depicting the mill was issued. The stamp with a face value of CZK 10 was designed by Petr Melan, engraved by Václav Fajt.

In 2009 the Czech National Bank issued a 2,500 CZK commemorative gold coin as part of the Industrial Heritage Sites series. The coin was designed by Jiří Harcuba.
