= Vladimír Oppl =

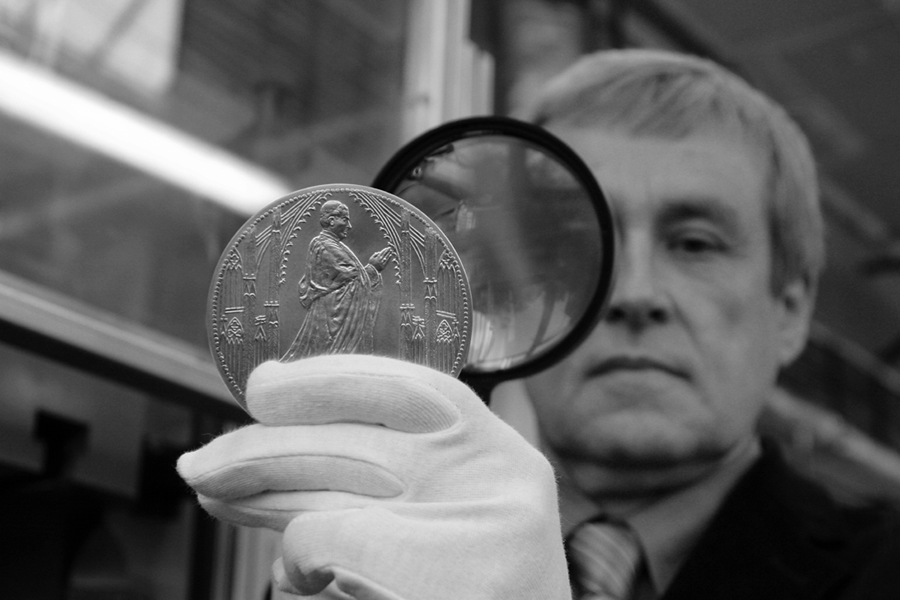
- Vladimír Oppl
- Born: January 19, 1953 (age 73); Ústí nad Labem, Czech Republic
- Education: Academy of Arts, Architecture and Design in Prague, Czech Republic
- Known for: Medallist and sculptor

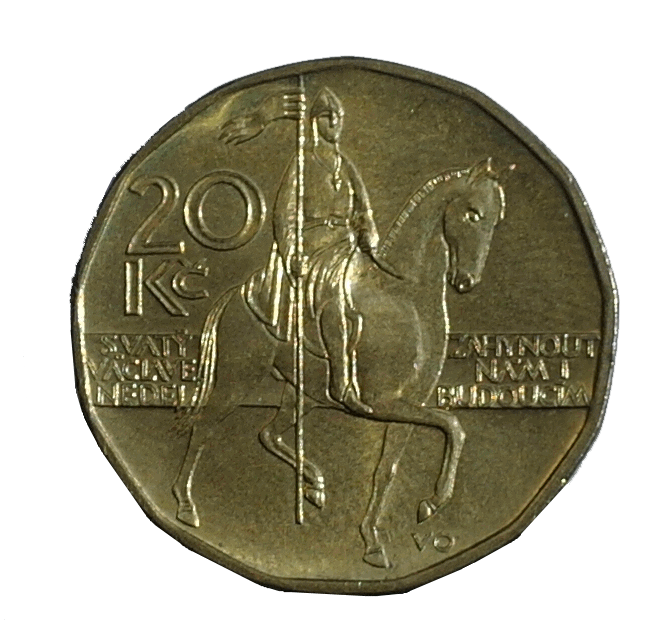
20 CZK model 2002 (revers) – designed by Vladimír Oppl

Vladimír Oppl (born January 19, 1953, in Ústí nad Labem, Czech Republic) is a Czech academic sculptor and medalist. His best-known designs include the Tomáš Garrigue Masaryk Order, the Czech circulating fifty-heller and the Czech circulating twenty-crown. He is also the author of the commemorative coin Nové Město Pražské (Prague's New Town) from the set of Charles IV, which was awarded the Most Beautiful Gold Coin of the World (2001) at the turn of the millennium.

== Biography ==
Vladimír Oppl was born on 19 January 1953 in Ústí nad Labem. After finishing the Ceramics High School in Bechyně, he studied at the Academy of Arts, Architecture and Design in Prague under professors Jan Kavan and Josef Malejovský. During that time he began to be interested in the medal design, namely after he won his first competition - he designed a commemorative medal for the Julius Fučík's 75th birth anniversary. After finishing his studies he worked for ten years as a lecturer at the academy and as a sculptor. After the Velvet Revolution in 1989 he started working independently. At present he lives and works in Prague.

== Works ==
Vladimír Oppl regularly participates in contests for coin and medal design announced by the Czech National Bank, prepares proposals for the Czech Mint, the Prague Mint, the National Treasury and foreign clients. He seeks his motives almost exclusively in the Czech history.

His best-known designs include the Czech circulation coin with a nominal value of 20 crowns (1993 model), a Czech 50-heller coin (1993 model), a platinum medal Church of Sts. Vitus weighing half a kilogram or a set of gold and silver medals Codex Gigas and gold coins Czech Crown with a nominal value of 1000, 2500 and 5000 CZK (1994).

Among his most successful coin designs is the commemorative coin for the 650th anniversary of the founding of Prague's New Town by Charles IV. It was named the most beautiful gold coin for 1999 in the traditional competition organized by the US magazine for numismatics, "World Coin News" and the publisher "Krause Publications".

In 1996 Oppl, the sculptor, re-recreated, together with Martin Ceplecha, the original Otakar Španiel's lion emblem from 1962. In August 1997 the granite copy was fitted under the statue of Jan Žižka at Vítkov National Monument.

Vladimír Oppl is also the author of the prestigious Tomáš Garrigue Masaryk Order in all classes.

Since 2014, he has been working closely with the National Treasury, a distributor of commemorative coins and medals. Every year the Treasury publishes several of its own issues, the back and face of which are decorated with designs embossed according to Vladimír Oppl. His designs are characterized by a unique, easily recognizable handwriting. What is typical for author's work are the fine elaborate details and an often complicated but easy to read composition. The medalist seeks inspiration for his filigree work in unusual areas, for example in embroidery on medieval fabrics of royal robes.

In 2014 and 2015 the National Treasury issued two medals, designed by Vladimír Oppl, stamped from 1 kg of pure silver. The first one was issued to commemorate the 670th anniversary of the founding of St. Vitus Cathedral in Prague. The second one paid tribute to the Father of the country - Charles IV, from whose imperial coronation 660 years have passed. Vladimír Oppl's motifs also decorate many National Treasury collections. Among the most popular are, for example, the collection of the Greatest Personalities of the Czech Nation, Life of Charles IV. or the golden collection Magic Prague, which commemorates the well-known Prague myths and legends.

In August 2017, the medalist work with the Czech National Bank (ČNB) to honor the upcoming centennial anniversary of the birth of the Czechoslovak republic. For the edition "Important personalities of the Czechoslovak state" ("Významné osobnosti československého státu") he designed three different reverse sides for the jubilee circulating twenty crowns. They featured portraits of the three Czech and Slovak founders: Tomáš Garrigue Masaryk, Edvard Beneš and Milan Rastislav Štefánik. (Vladimír Oppl also designed the twenty-crown coin, which has been in circulation since 1993.). The ČNB had 3 x 200,000 coins minted and started their circulation on 24 October 2018.

Important personalities of the Czechoslovak state

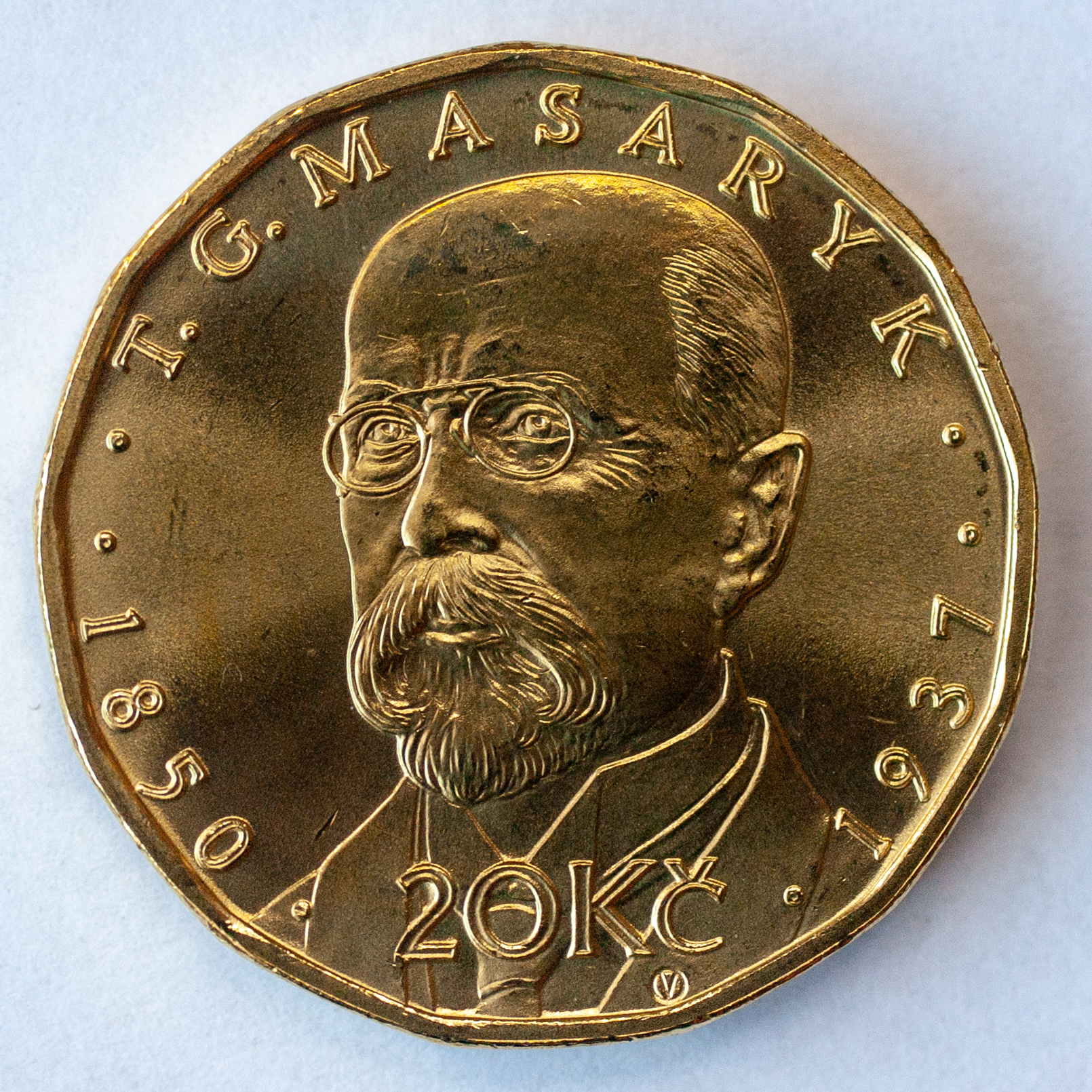
Twenty crown model 2018 I - Tomáš Garrigue Masaryk

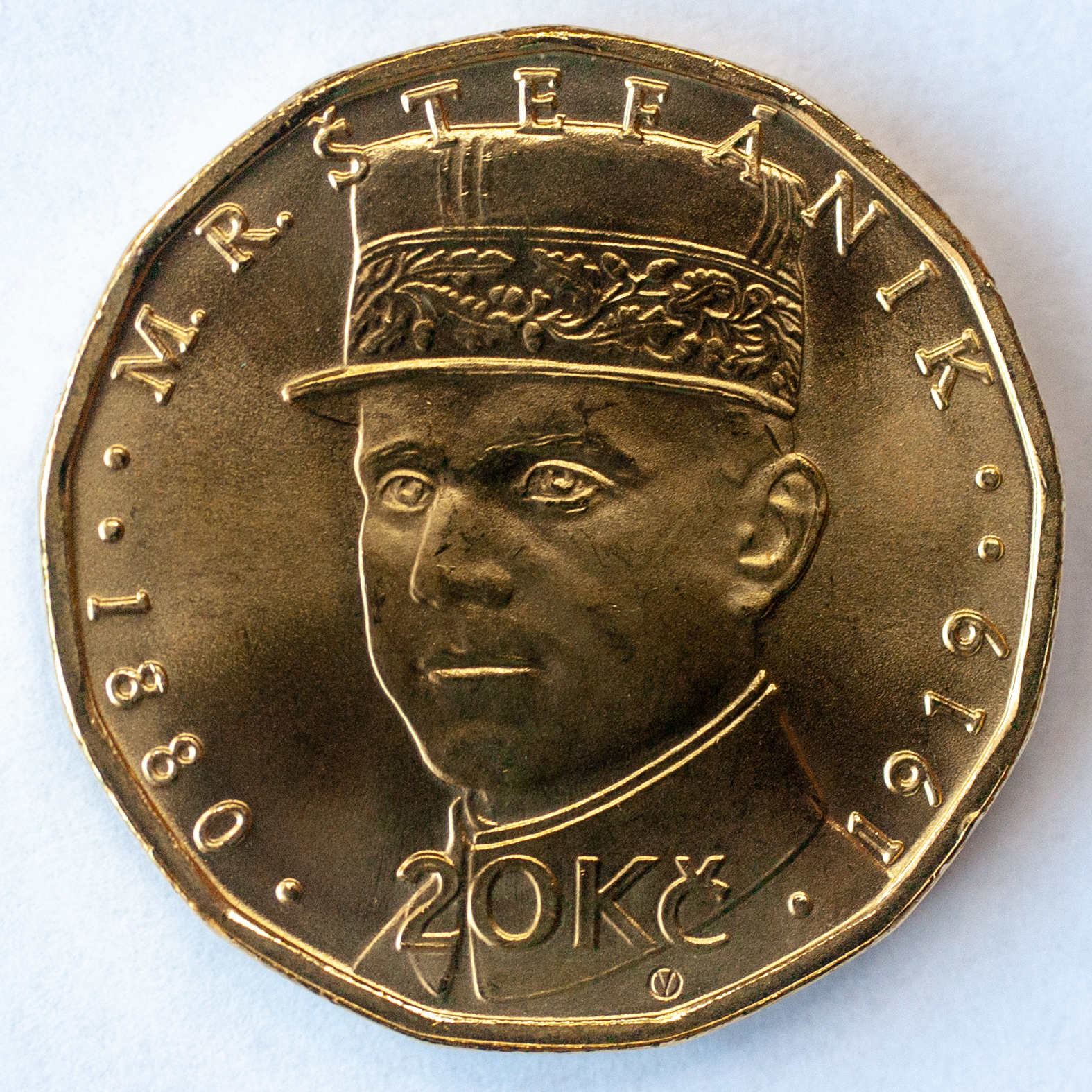
Twenty crown model 2018 II - Milan Rastislav Štefánik

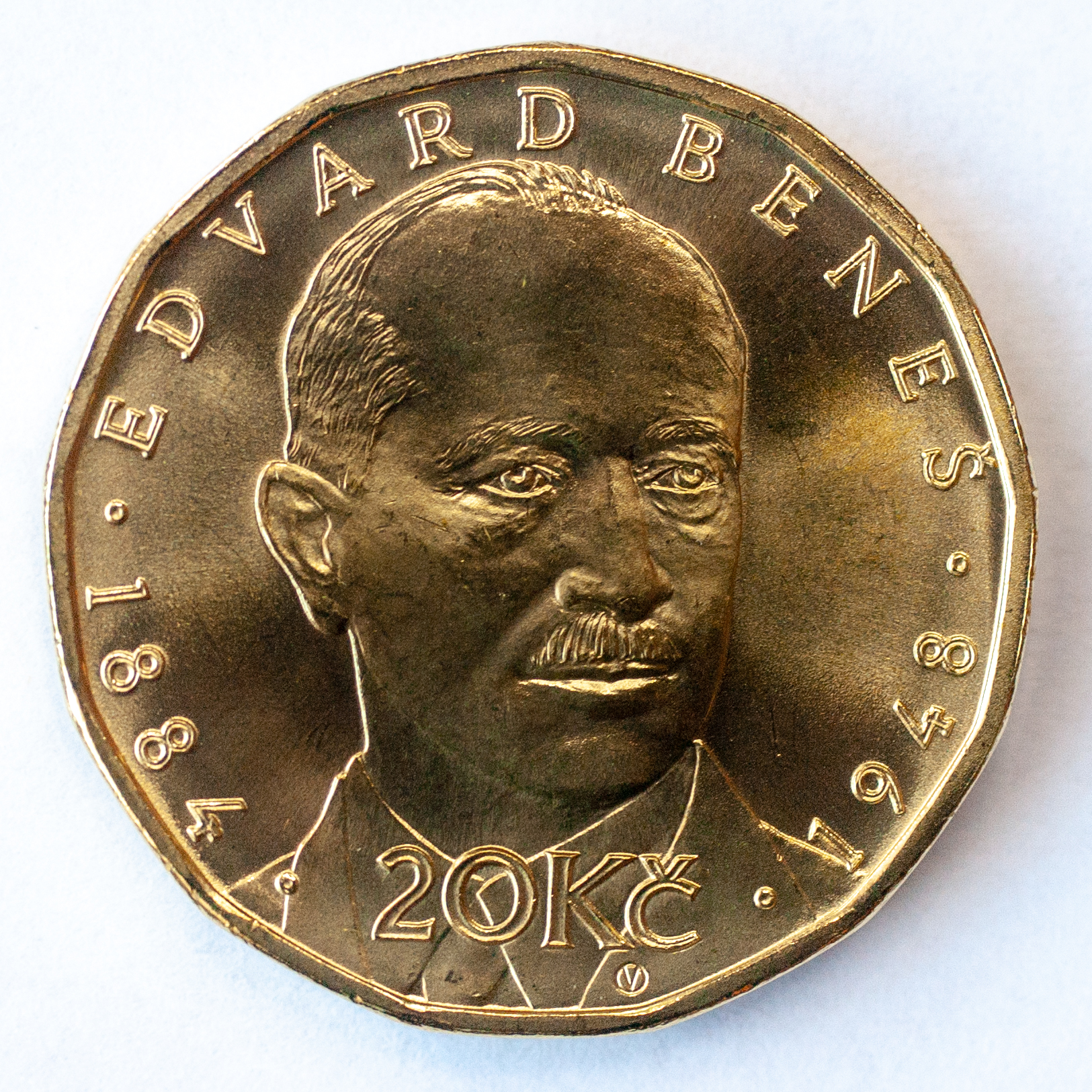
Twenty crown model 2018 III - Edvard Beneš

In September 2017, the ČNB asked Vladimír Oppl to design the reverse sides of a new 3-piece set of jubilee circulation twenty crowns for the 2019 model. The edition entitled “Important personalities of the Czechoslovak currency” ("Významné osobnosti československé měny") portraits the three most important Czech financiers from the period between WVI and WVII: Alois Rašín, Vilém Pospíšil and Karel Engliš. The ČNB had 3 x 200,000 coins minted and started their circulation on 30 January 2019.

Important personalities of the Czechoslovak currency

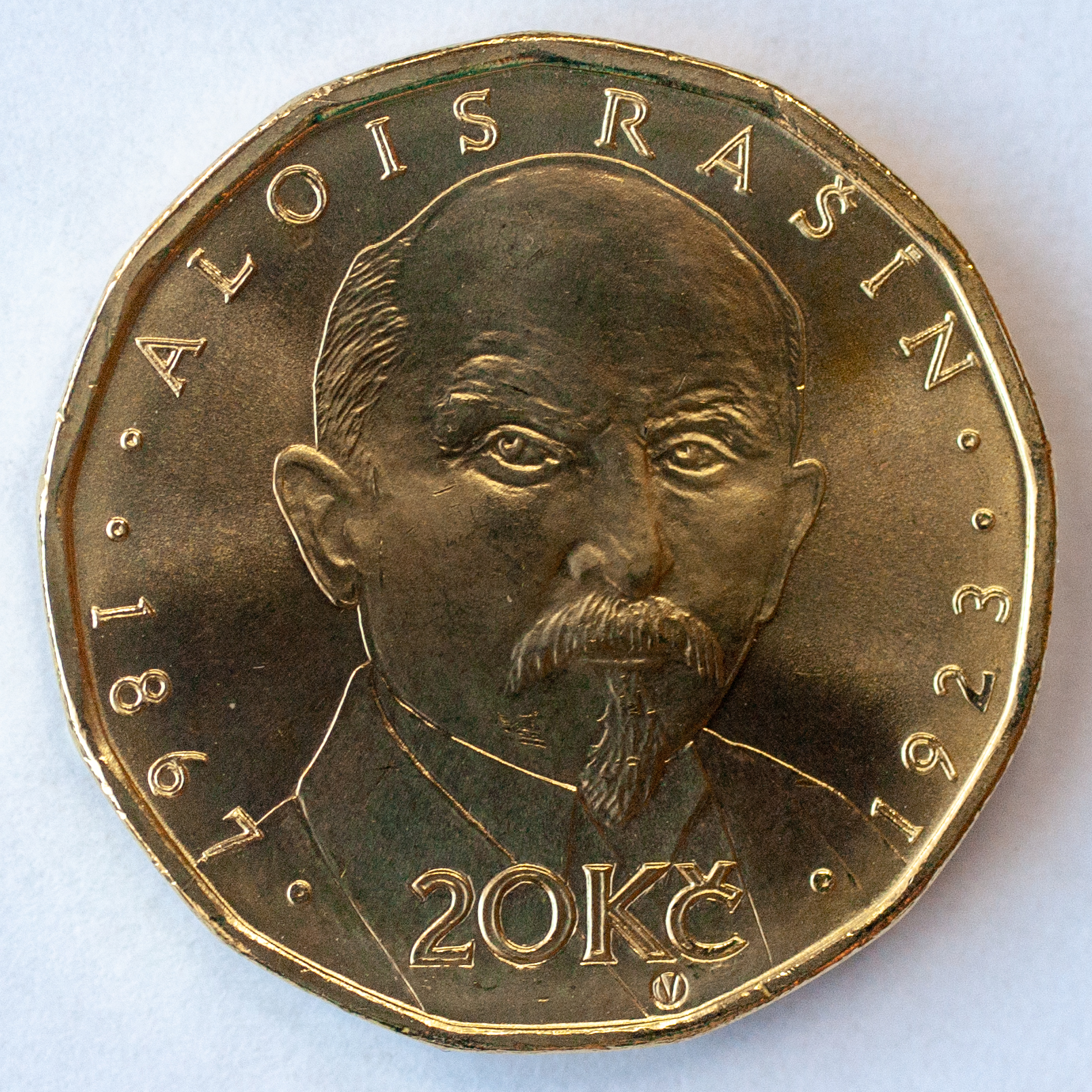
Twenty crown model 2019 I - Alois Rašín

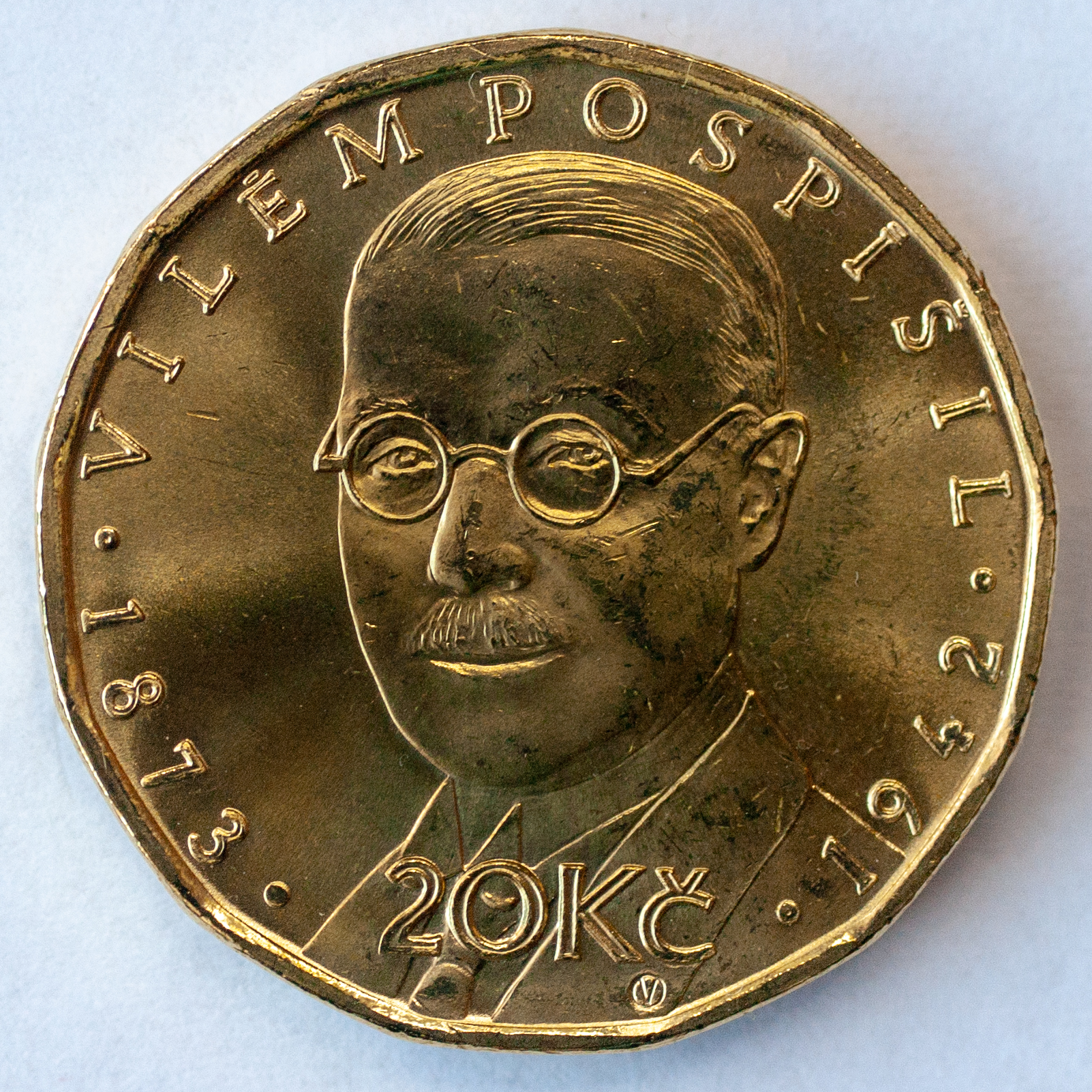
Twenty crown model 2019 II - Vilém Pospíšil

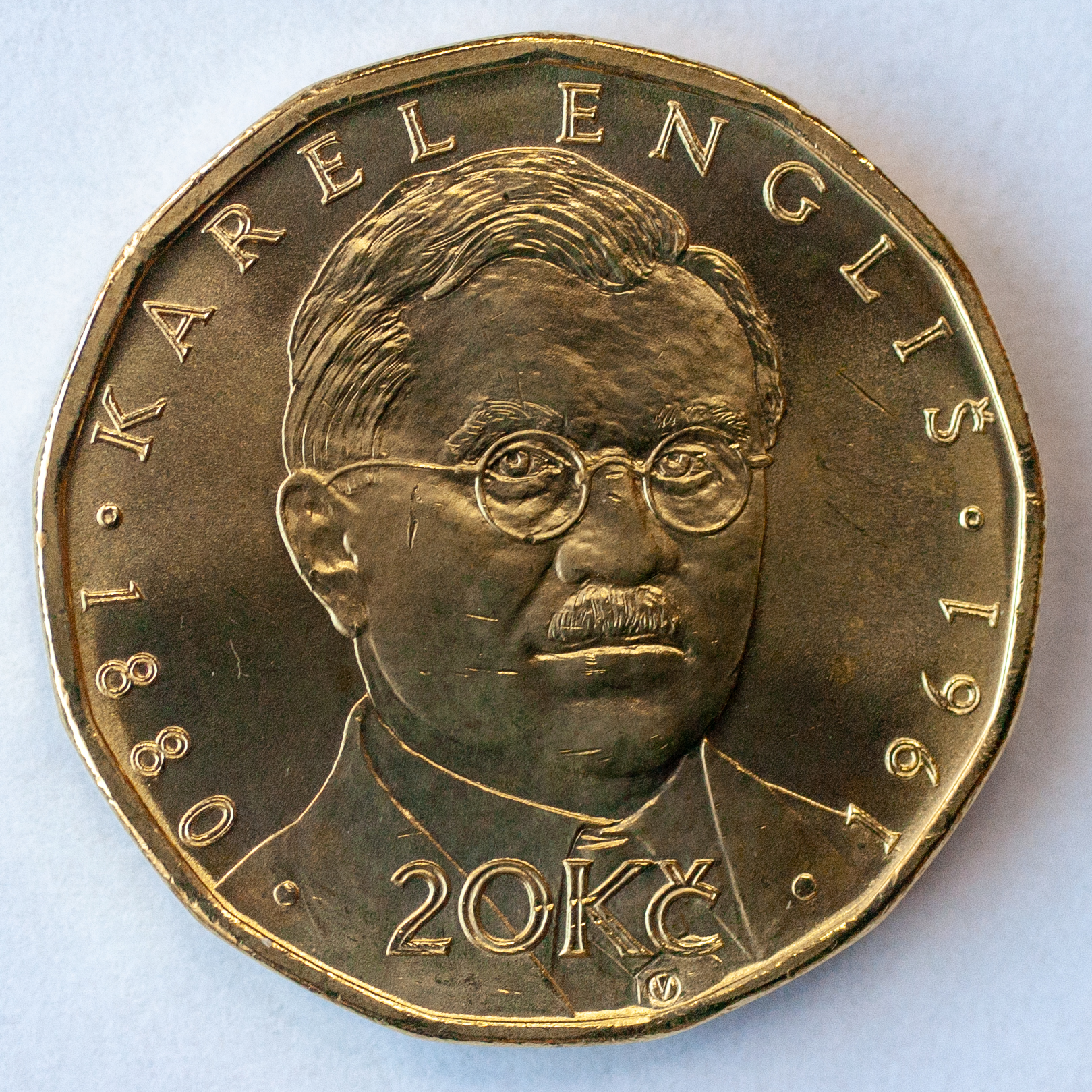
Twenty crown model 2019 s III - Karel Engliš

On 31 January 2019 the ČNB introduced the second largest gold coin in the world (the largest gold coin in Europe) as part of the 100th anniversary of the Czechoslovak crown inception celebrations. The coin was made from the bank's gold reserves and was designed by Vladimír Oppl . The nominal value of the gold coin is CZK 100 million.
