= Commemorative coins of Czechoslovakia =

The commemorative coins of Czechoslovakia were minted by the State Bank of Czechoslovakia. They were legal tender not only in Czechoslovakia but in 1993–2000 in the Czech Republic too.

== Czechoslovak Socialist Republic (1948–1989) ==
- 10 Kčs and 25 Kčs, silver, 10th anniversary of Slovak National Uprising, 1954
- 10 Kčs, 25 Kčs, 50 Kčs and 100 Kčs, silver, 10th anniversary of liberation of Czechoslovakia by Soviet army, 1955

== Czech and Slovak Federative Republic (1989–1992) ==
- 100 Kčs, silver, 100th anniversary of Velká pardubická horse race, 1990
- 50 Kčs, silver, 1st anniversary of canonization of Saint Agnes of Bohemia, 1990
- 100 Kčs, silver, 100th anniversary of birth of Bohuslav Martinů, 1990
- 50 Kčs, silver, 150th anniversary of the run of the first Czech steamship Bohemia, 1991
- 100 Kčs, silver, 100th anniversary of birth of Antonín Dvořák, 1991
- 100 Kčs, silver, Estates Theatre in Prague newly opened, 200th anniversary of death of Wolfgang Amadeus Mozart, 1991
- 50 Kčs, silver, Karlovy Vary, Mariánské Lázně and Piešťany Spas, 1991
- 500 Kčs, silver, 400th anniversary of birth of Jan Ámos Komenský, 1992
- 100 Kčs, silver, 50th anniversary of Lidice and Ležáky destruction, 1992
- 100 Kčs, silver, 175th anniversary of establishment of Moravia Land Museum (Moravské zemské muzeum) in Brno, 1992
- 500 Kčs, silver, 100th anniversary of Czechoslovak tennis, 1992
- 100 Kčs, silver, 1000th anniversary of establishment of Břevnov Monastery, 1992
- 100 Kčs, silver, 100th anniversary of establishment od Slovak museal society (Muzeálna slovenská spoločnosť)

== See also ==
- Commemorative coins of the Czech Republic
- Commemorative coins of Slovakia
