= Daniel Halladay =

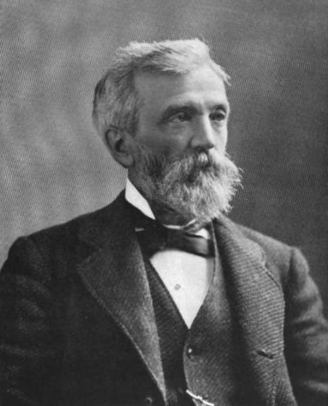
- Born: November 24, 1826; Marlboro, Vermont
- Died: March 1, 1916 (aged 89); Santa Ana, California
- Occupations: Engineer, inventor, businessman

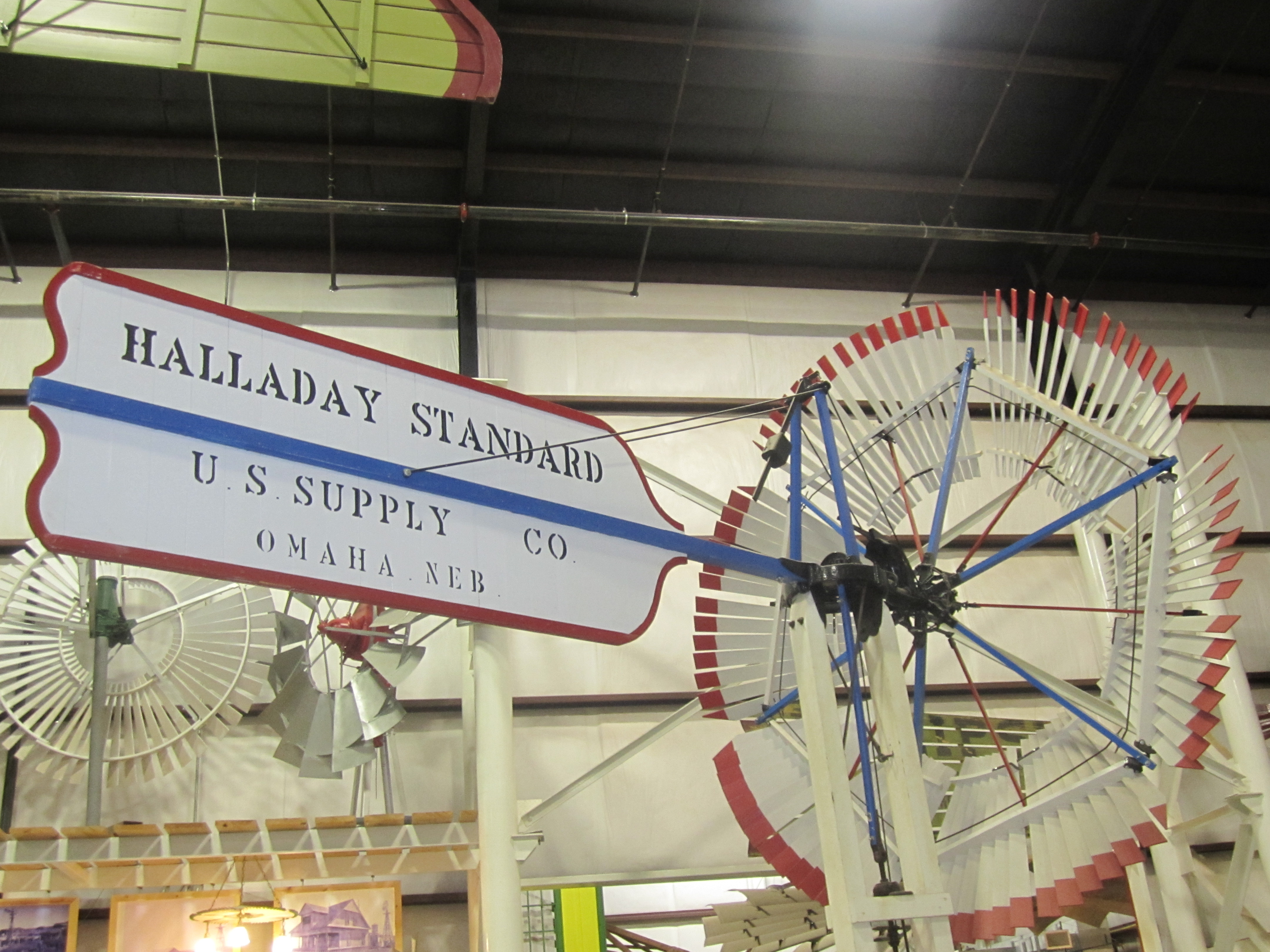
Halladay Windmill on display at the American Wind Power Center in Lubbock, Texas

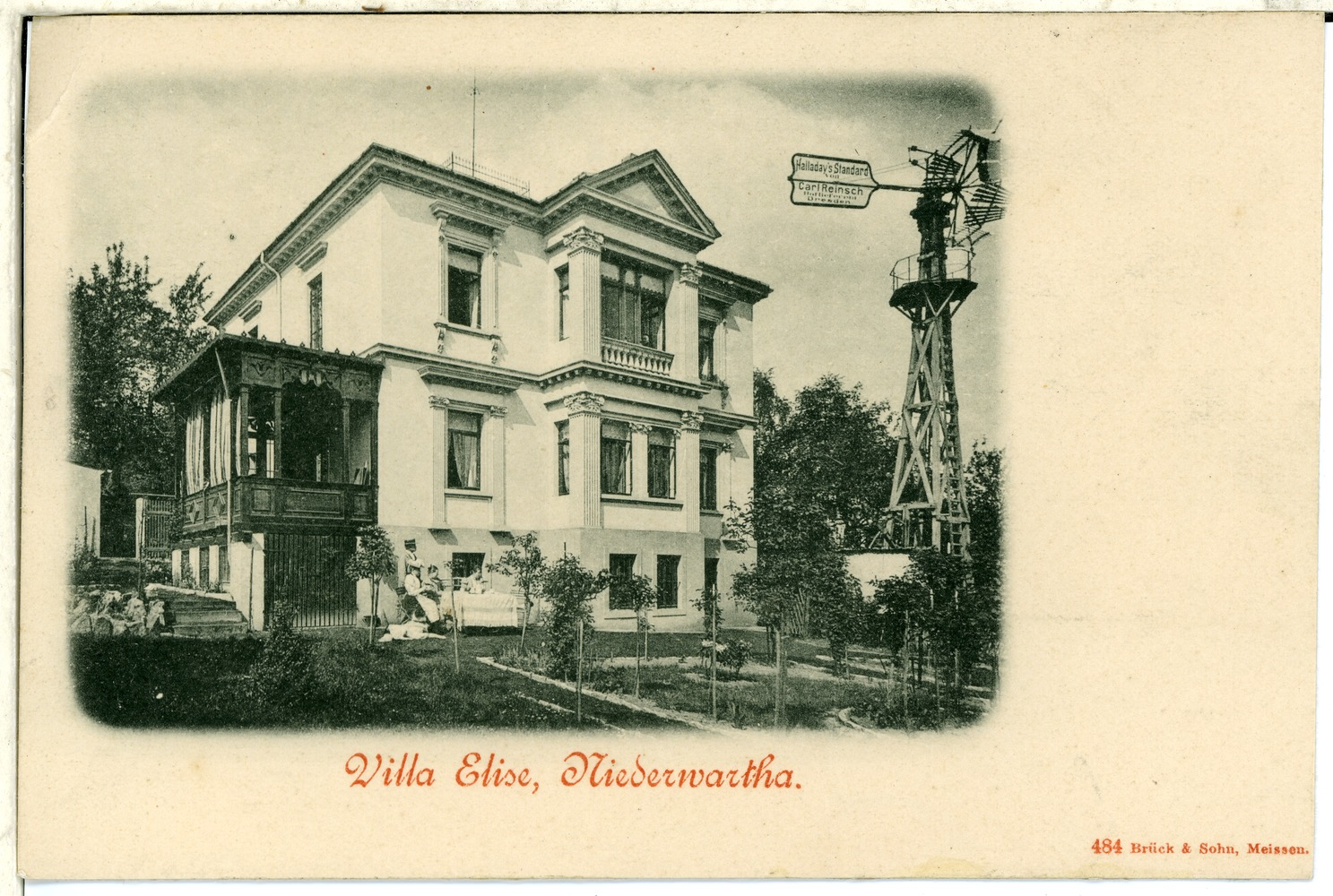
Halladay Windmill in Niederwartha, Dresden, Saxony, Germany

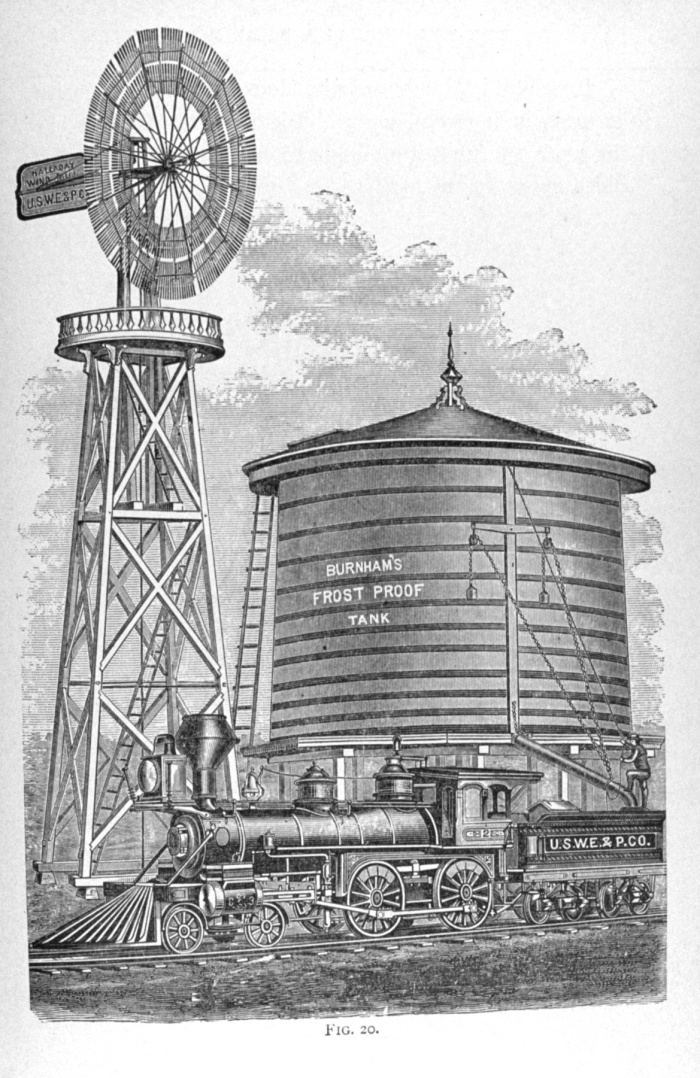
Windmill in conjunction with water tank

Daniel Halladay (November 24, 1826 in Marlboro, Vermont – March 1, 1916 in Santa Ana, California) was an American engineer, inventor and businessman, best known for his innovative self-regulating windmill, invented in Ellington, Connecticut in 1853.

Because steam trains required frequent resupplies of clean water, Halliday's windmill and subsequent self-regulating designs became an essential part of early railroad infrastructure, particularly in the Great Plains.

Versions of this windmill became an iconic part of the rural landscape in the United States, Argentina, Canada, New Zealand, and South Africa.

The historic Windmill at Ruprechtov based on Halladay's invention can be found in Ruprechtov in the Vyškov District of the Czech Republic.
