= Ruprechtov =

- Municipality
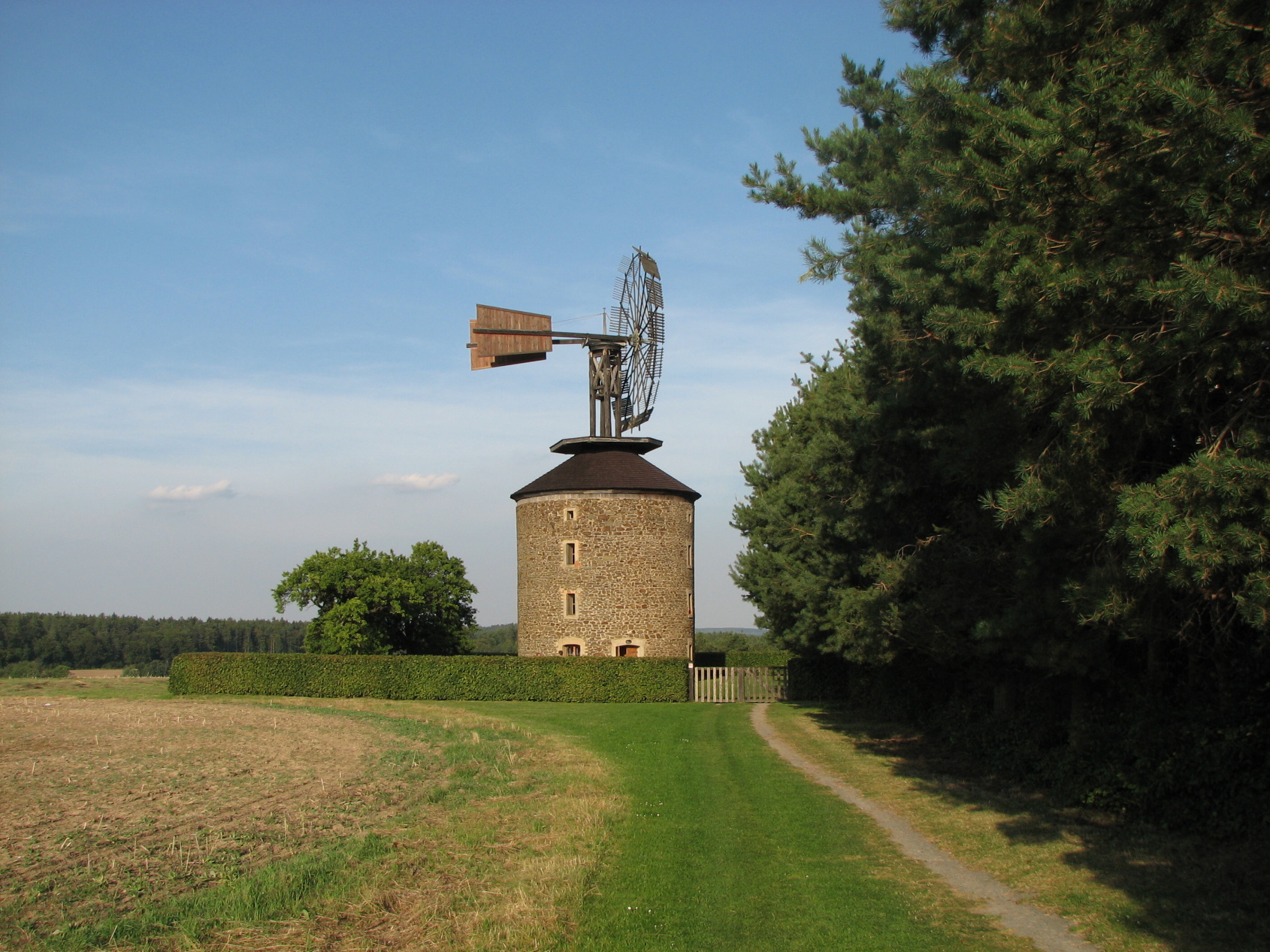
- Windmill

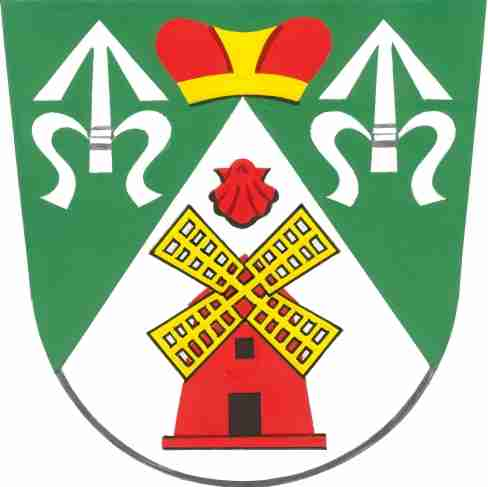
- Flag Coat of arms

- Location in the Czech Republic
- Coordinates: 49°19′43″N 16°51′5″E
- Country: Czech Republic
- Region: South Moravian
- District: Vyškov
- First mentioned: 1446

Area
  - Total: 11.48 km^{2} (4.43 sq mi)
- Elevation: 514 m (1,686 ft)

Population (2026-01-01)
  - Total: 624
  - Density: 54.4/km^{2} (141/sq mi)
- Time zone: UTC+1 (CET)
  - Summer (DST): UTC+2 (CEST)
- Postal code: 683 06
- Website: www.ruprechtov.cz

Ruprechtov is a municipality and village in Vyškov District in the South Moravian Region of the Czech Republic. It has about 600 inhabitants.

== Geography ==
Ruprechtov is located about 11 kilometres (7 mi) northwest of Vyškov and 20 km (12 mi) northeast of Brno. It lies in the Drahany Highlands. The highest point is at 554 m (1,818 ft) above sea level.

== History ==
The first written mention of Ruprechtov is from 1446, when it was part of the Račice estate, owned by the Lords of Kravaře.

== Demographics ==
Historical population

Year	Pop.	±%
1869	1,065	—
1880	1,065	+0.0%
1890	1,173	+10.1%
1900	1,287	+9.7%
1910	1,237	−3.9%

Year	Pop.	±%
1921	1,096	−11.4%
1930	1,014	−7.5%
1950	794	−21.7%
1961	800	+0.8%
1970	739	−7.6%

Year	Pop.	±%
1980	689	−6.8%
1991	566	−17.9%
2001	554	−2.1%
2011	570	+2.9%
2021	604	+6.0%

Source: Censuses

== Transport ==
There are no railways or major roads passing through the municipality.

== Sights ==
The municipality is known for the Ruprechtov Windmill. This classical Dutch-type windmill was built in 1873 and is equipped with a Halladay turbine, which makes it a unique technical monument of European importance.

The Church of Saint Wenceslaus is a modern building dating from 1946.
