= Eva Hašková =

Czech printmaker and illustrator (born 1946)

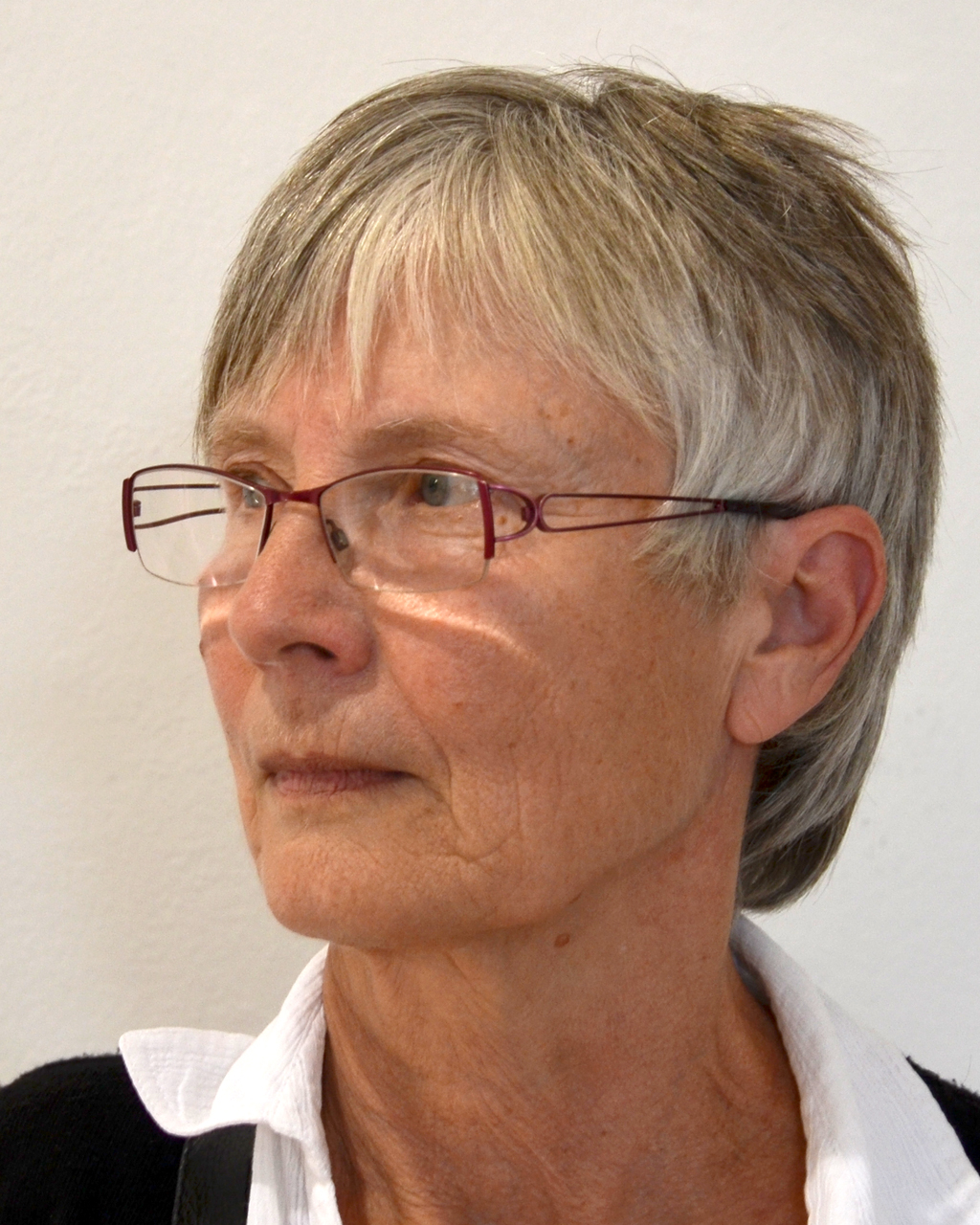
Eva Hašková in 2016

Eva Hašková (born 4 January 1946) is a Czech printmaker and illustrator.

== Life and career ==
A native of Kladno, Hašková graduated from the Academy of Arts, Architecture and Design in Prague, where she had studied under Zdeněk Sklenář, in 1974. Much of her work is created using an intaglio process combining etching and aquatint. A member of SČUG Hollar, she has received numerous prizes for her work during her career, and has exhibited extensively both in the Czech Republic and abroad.

One work by Hašková, the etching, and aquatint Vzpomínka na Karla Capka/Memory of Karel Capek of 1990, is owned by the National Gallery of Art.
