= Czech Mint =

Company in the Czech Republic

Česká mincovna, a.s.
- Company type: Akciová společnost
- Industry: Metalworking
- Founded: 1993; 33 years ago
- Headquarters: Jablonec nad Nisou, Czech Republic
- Area served: Czech Republic
- Products: Coins; Medals
- Revenue: 2,038,588,000 Czech koruna (2024)
- Operating income: 139,442,000 Czech koruna (2024)
- Net income: 87,253,000 Czech koruna (2024)
- Total assets: 868,304,000 Czech koruna (2024)
- Number of employees: 125 (2024)
- Website: ceskamincovna.cz

The Czech Mint (Czech: Česká mincovna) is a mint located in the Czech Republic which is responsible for producing coins of the Czech koruna. The mint was established in 1992 following the country's dissolution from Czechoslovakia where coins of the Czechoslovak koruna were produced at the Kremnica Mint in Slovakia.
