= Czech koruna =

Currency of the Czech Republic

česká koruna (Czech)
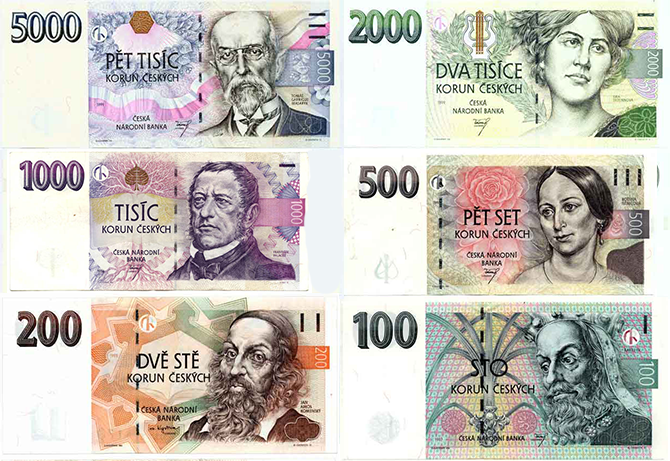
Czech banknotes
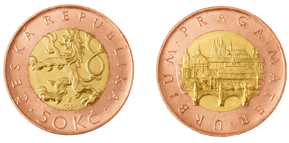
50 Kč coin

ISO 4217
- Code: CZK (numeric: 203)
- Subunit: 0.01

Units of account
- Plural: The language(s) of this currency belong(s) to the Slavic languages. There is more than one way to construct plural forms.
- Symbol: Kč
- Subunit
- 1/100: haléř^{a}
- Symbol
- haléř^{a}: h

Denominations
- Banknotes
- Freq. used: 100 Kč, 200 Kč, 500 Kč, 1,000 Kč, 2,000 Kč
- Rarely used: 5,000 Kč
- Coins: 1 Kč, 2 Kč, 5 Kč, 10 Kč, 20 Kč, 50 Kč

Demographics
- Date of introduction: 1993
- Replaced: Czechoslovak koruna
- User(s): Czech Republic

Issuance
- Central bank: Czech National Bank
- Website: www.cnb.cz
- Mint: Česká mincovna
- Website: ceskamincovna.cz

Valuation
- Inflation: 2.8%
- Source: Czech Statistical Office, November 2024
- Method: CPI
- ^{a}) The haléř is still used for accounting purposes (e.g., financial reports).

The koruna, or crown (sign: Kč; code: CZK, Czech: koruna česká), is the currency of the Czech Republic since its introduction in 1993. The koruna is one of the European Union's seven currencies, and the Czech Republic is legally bound to adopt the euro once it satisfies the convergence criteria.

The official name in Czech is koruna česká (plural koruny české, though the zero-suffixed genitive plural form korun českých is used on banknotes and coins of value 5 Kč or higher). The ISO 4217 code is CZK and the local acronym is Kč, which is placed after the numeric value (e.g., "50 Kč") or sometimes before it (as is seen on the 10-koruna coin). One crown is made up of 100 hellers (abbreviated as "h", official name in Czech: singular: haléř, nominative plural: haléře, genitive plural: haléřů – used with numbers higher or equal to 5 – e.g. 3 haléře, 8 haléřů), but hellers have now been withdrawn from circulation, and the smallest unit of physical currency is 1 Kč.

== History ==
In 1892, the Austro-Hungarian krone replaced the gulden at the rate of two kronen to one gulden (which is also the reason why the 10 Kč coin had been nicknamed pětka or "fiver" - and has been in use in informal conversation up until nowadays). The name was suggested by the emperor, Franz Joseph I of Austria. After Austria-Hungary dissolved in 1918, Czechoslovakia was the only successor state to retain the name of its imperial-era currency. During the Second World War, the currency on the occupied Czech territory was artificially weakened. The Czechoslovak crown was restored after the war. It underwent a highly controversial monetary reform in 1953.

The Czech koruna replaced the Czechoslovak koruna in 1993 after the dissolution of Czechoslovakia. It first consisted of overstamped 20 Kčs, 50 Kčs, 100 Kčs, 500 Kčs, and 1,000 Kčs banknotes, and a new series was properly introduced in 1993.

In November 2013, the Czech National Bank (ČNB) intervened to weaken the exchange rate of the koruna through a monetary stimulus to stop the currency from excessive strengthening. This was meant to support the Czech economy, mainly focused on export, but people were unhappy about this step because it was set up before Christmas, which led to raising the prices of imported goods. In late 2016, the ČNB stated that the return to conventional monetary policy was planned for mid-2017. After higher-than-expected inflation and other figures, the national bank removed the cap at a special monetary meeting on 6 April 2017. The koruna avoided significant volatility and City Index Group stated: "If you want to drop a currency peg, then the ČNB can show you how to do it".

== Euro adoption discussion ==
The Czech Republic planned to adopt the euro in 2010, but its government suspended that plan indefinitely in 2005. Although the country is economically well positioned to adopt the euro, there is considerable opposition to the move within the Czech Republic. According to a survey conducted in April 2014, only 16% of the Czech population was in favour of replacing the koruna with the euro. As reported by an April 2018 survey by CVVM (Public Opinion Research Center), this value remained at nearly identical levels between 2014 and 2018, with only 20% of the Czech population above 15 years old supporting euro adoption.

== Coins ==
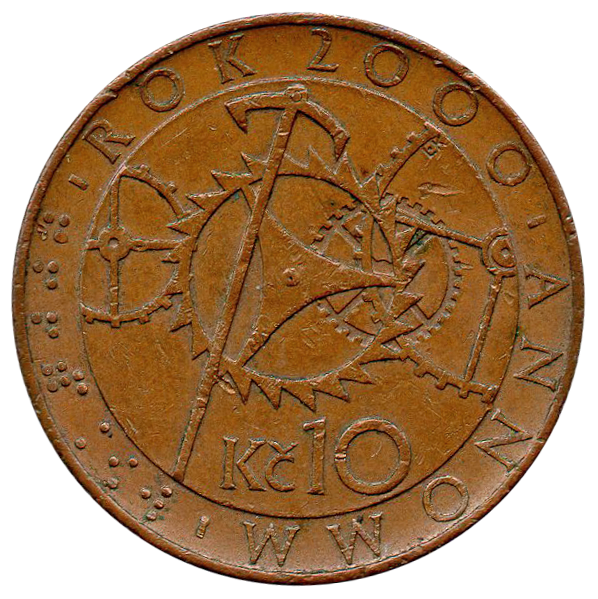
10 Kč coin series 2000

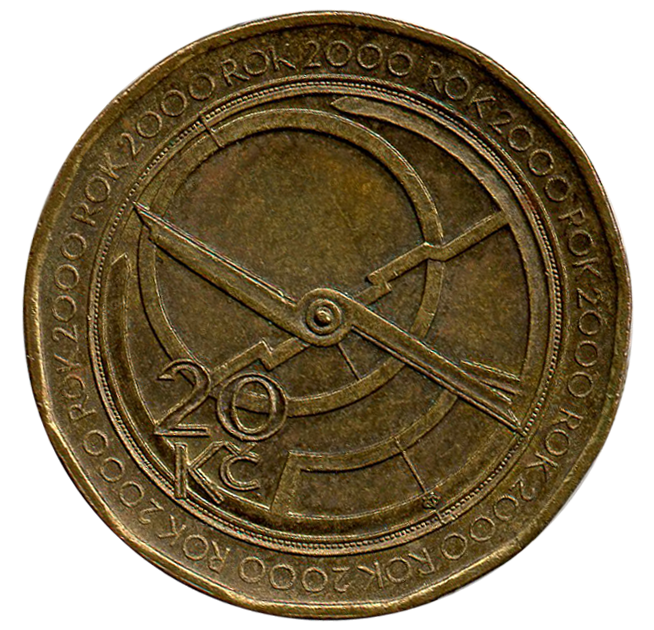
20 Kč coin series 2000

The coins of the Czech koruna increase in size and weight with value.

In 1993, coins were introduced in denominations of 10, 20 and 50 haléřů (h), 1 Kč, 2 Kč, 5 Kč, 10 Kč, 20 Kč and 50 Kč. The 10 h and 20 h coins were taken out of circulation by 31 October 2003 and the 50 h coins by 31 August 2008 due to their diminishing purchasing power and circulation. However, financial amounts are still written with the accuracy of 1-haléř (CZK 0.01); prices in retail shops are usually multiples of CZK 0.10. When cash transactions are made, the amount is rounded to the nearest integer.

In 2000, the 10 Kč and 20 Kč coins were minted with different obverses to commemorate the millennium. In 1993 and 1994, coins were minted in Winnipeg and Hamburg, then in the Czech Republic. The 10 Kč and 50 Kč coins were designed by Ladislav Kozák (1934–2007).

Since 1997, sets for collectors have also been issued yearly with proof-quality coins. In addition, there is a tradition of issuing commemorative coins – including silver and gold coins – for numismatic purposes.

For a complete listing, see Commemorative coins of the Czech Republic.

=== Current series ===
Current series (1993)
Image	Value	Technical parameters				Description			Issued from	Withdrawal
Image	Value	Diameter (mm)	Thickness (mm)	Mass (g)	Composition	Edge	Obverse	Reverse	Issued from	Withdrawal
	10 h	15.50	1.70	0.60	Aluminium: 99% Magnesium: 1%	Smooth	Czech lion; year of issue; lettering: ČESKÁ REPUBLIKA	Value; Stylized river	1993	2003
	20 h	17.00	1.70	0.74	Aluminium: 99% Magnesium: 1%	Reeded	Czech lion; year of issue; lettering: ČESKÁ REPUBLIKA	Value; Linden leaf	1993	2003
	20 h	17.00	1.70	0.74	Aluminium: 99% Magnesium: 1%	Reeded	Czech lion; year of issue; lettering: ČESKÁ REPUBLIKA	Value; Linden leaf	1997	2003
	50 h	19.00	1.70	0.90	Aluminium: 99% Magnesium: 1%	Interrupted reeding	Czech lion; year of issue; lettering: ČESKÁ REPUBLIKA	Value	1993	2008
	1 Kč	20.00	1.85	3.60	Nickel-plated steel	Reeded	Czech lion; year of issue; lettering: ČESKÁ REPUBLIKA	Value; St. Wenceslas crown	1993	Current
	2 Kč	21.50 (11-sided)	1.85	3.70	Nickel-plated steel	Smooth	Czech lion; year of issue; lettering: ČESKÁ REPUBLIKA	Value; Great Moravian gombik	1993	Current
	5 Kč	23.00	1.85	4.80	Nickel-plated steel	Smooth	Czech lion; year of issue; lettering: ČESKÁ REPUBLIKA	Value; Charles Bridge, Vltava, linden leaf	1993	Current
	10 Kč	24.50	2.55	7.62	Copper-plated steel	Reeded	Czech lion; year of issue; lettering: ČESKÁ REPUBLIKA	Value; St. Peter and Paul cathedral, Brno	1993	Current
	20 Kč	26.00 (13-sided)	2.55	8.43	Brass-plated steel	Smooth	Czech lion; year of issue; lettering: ČESKÁ REPUBLIKA	St. Wenceslas statue; Lettering: SVATÝ VÁCLAVE; NEDEJ ZAHYNOUT; NÁM I BUDOUCÍM (Note: English: Saint Wenceslas, do not let us perish, nor our descendants.)	1993	Current
	50 Kč	27.50	2.55	9.70	Outer: Copper-plated steel	Smooth	Czech lion; year of issue; lettering: ČESKÁ REPUBLIKA	Prague; Lettering: PRAGA MATER URBIUM (Note: English: Prague, mother of cities.)	1993	Current
	50 Kč	17.00	2.55	9.70	Inner: Brass-plated steel	Smooth	Czech lion; year of issue; lettering: ČESKÁ REPUBLIKA	Prague; Lettering: PRAGA MATER URBIUM	1993	Current

=== Circulating commemorative coins ===
Circulating commemorative coins
Image	Value	Technical parameters				Description			Issue
Image	Value	Diameter (mm)	Thickness (mm)	Mass (g)	Composition	Edge	Obverse	Reverse	Issue
	10 Kč	24.50	2.55	7.62	Copper-plated steel	Reeded	Czech lion; year of issue; lettering: ČESKÁ REPUBLIKA	Clock mechanism; value; Lettering: ROK 2000 ANNO MM	2000
	20 Kč	26.00 (13-sided)	2.55	8.43	Brass-plated steel	Smooth	Czech lion; year of issue; lettering: ČESKÁ REPUBLIKA	Astrolabe; value; Lettering: ROK 2000	2000
	20 Kč	26.00 (13-sided)	2.55	8.43	Brass-plated steel	Smooth	Czech lion; year of issue; lettering: ČESKÁ REPUBLIKA	Edvard Beneš; value	2018 (ČSR personalities)
	20 Kč	26.00 (13-sided)	2.55	8.43	Brass-plated steel	Smooth	Czech lion; year of issue; lettering: ČESKÁ REPUBLIKA	Milan Rastislav Štefánik; value	2018 (ČSR personalities)
	20 Kč	26.00 (13-sided)	2.55	8.43	Brass-plated steel	Smooth	Czech lion; year of issue; lettering: ČESKÁ REPUBLIKA	Tomáš Masaryk; value	2018 (ČSR personalities)
	20 Kč	26.00 (13-sided)	2.55	8.43	Brass-plated steel	Smooth	Czech lion; year of issue; lettering: ČESKÁ REPUBLIKA	Alois Rašín; value	2019 (ČSR currency personalities)
	20 Kč	26.00 (13-sided)	2.55	8.43	Brass-plated steel	Smooth	Czech lion; year of issue; lettering: ČESKÁ REPUBLIKA	Karel Engliš; value	2019 (ČSR currency personalities)
	20 Kč	26.00 (13-sided)	2.55	8.43	Brass-plated steel	Smooth	Czech lion; year of issue; lettering: ČESKÁ REPUBLIKA	Vilém Pospíšil; value	2019 (ČSR currency personalities)

== Banknotes ==
The first Czech banknotes were issued on 8 February 1993 and consisted of Czechoslovak notes with adhesive stamps affixed to them. Only the 100 Kčs, 500 Kčs and 1,000 Kčs notes were overstamped, the lower denominations circulated unchanged during this transitional period. Each stamp bears a Roman and Arabic numeral identifying the denomination of the banknote to which it is affixed (C and 100, D and 500, M and 1,000). Subsequent issues of the 1,000 Kč note replaced the adhesive stamp with a printed image of same.

A newly designed series of banknotes in denominations of 20 Kč, 50 Kč, 100 Kč, 200 Kč, 500 Kč, 1,000 Kč and 5,000 Kč were introduced later in 1993 and the designs are still in use at present – except for 20 Kč, 50 Kč and the first versions of 1,000 Kč and 5,000 Kč notes, since the security features of 1,000 Kč and 5,000 Kč notes were upgraded in the subsequent issues. These banknotes, designed by Oldřich Kulhánek, feature renowned Czech persons on the obverse and abstract compositions on the reverse. Modern protective elements can be found on all banknotes.

In 2007, the Czech National Bank started issuing new upgraded banknotes with upgraded security features. These include a new colour-shifting security thread, additional watermarks and EURion constellations. The first denomination to be issued with the new features was the 2,000 Kč, followed by the 1,000 Kč in 2008, the 500 Kč and 5,000 Kč in 2009 and finally ending with the issuance of the 100 Kč and 200 Kč notes in 2018. In 2022, all older versions of the 100-2000 Kč notes without the upgraded security features were withdrawn.

In practice, the 5000 Kč is not commonly found in circulation due to them being prone to misuse or illicit activity (e.g., money laundering). As of December 2025, there were 24.4 million of those banknotes in circulation. In contrast, the next-highest denomination, the 2000 Kč, is the most widely circulated banknote in the country, with 209.7 million in circulation.

=== Stamped series ===
Image		Value	Dimensions	Main colour	Language	Description		Date of		
Obverse	Reverse	Value	Dimensions	Main colour	Language	Obverse	Reverse	printing	issue	withdrawal
Czechoslovak banknotes
		10 Kčs	133 × 67	Brown	Slovak	Pavol Országh-Hviezdoslav	Orava scene	1986	7 February 1993	31 July 1993
		20 Kčs	138 × 67	Blue	Czech	Comenius	Illustration related to culture and education	1988	7 February 1993	31 July 1993
		50 Kčs	143 × 67	Red	Slovak	Ľudovít Štúr	View of Bratislava with the castle (from the restaurant on the top of the pylon of the Nový Most)	1987	7 February 1993	31 July 1993
Overstamped Czechoslovak banknotes
		100 Kč	165 × 81	Green	Czech	Peasant and worker	View of Prague with the castle and the Charles Bridge	1961	7 February 1993	31 August 1993
		500 Kč	153 × 67	Brown	Slovak	Partisans of the SNP 1944	Devín Castle	1973	7 February 1993	31 August 1993
		1,000 Kč	158 × 67	Blue	Czech	Bedřich Smetana	View of the Vltava at Vyšehrad	1985	7 February 1993	31 August 1993

=== First series ===
First series (1993)
Image		Value	Dimensions (mm)	Main colour	Description		Issue	Withdrawn	Lapse
Obverse	Reverse	Value	Dimensions (mm)	Main colour	Obverse	Reverse	Issue	Withdrawn	Lapse
		20 Kč	128 × 64	Blue	Otakar I	Ottokar's crown Golden Bull of Sicily seal	20 April 1994	31 August 2008	31 August 2014
		50 Kč	134 × 64	Red	Agnes of Bohemia	St. Salvator's church; Convent of St. Agnes	6 October 1993	31 January 2007	31 March 2017
		50 Kč	134 × 64	Red	Agnes of Bohemia	St. Salvator's church; Convent of St. Agnes	21 December 1994	31 March 2011	31 March 2017
		50 Kč	134 × 64	Red	Agnes of Bohemia	St. Salvator's church; Convent of St. Agnes	10 September 1997	31 March 2011	31 March 2017
		100 Kč	140 × 69	Turquoise	Charles IV	Charles University seal	30 June 1993	31 January 2007	Indefinite
		100 Kč	140 × 69	Turquoise	Charles IV	Charles University seal	21 June 1995	1 July 2022	Indefinite
		100 Kč	140 × 69	Turquoise	Charles IV	Charles University seal	15 October 1997	1 July 2022	Indefinite
		200 Kč	146 × 69	Orange	John Amos Comenius	Orbis Pictus; Joined hands	8 February 1993	31 January 2007	Indefinite
		200 Kč	146 × 69	Orange	John Amos Comenius	Orbis Pictus; Joined hands	14 August 1996	1 July 2022	Indefinite
		200 Kč	146 × 69	Orange	John Amos Comenius	Orbis Pictus; Joined hands	6 January 1999	1 July 2022	Indefinite
		500 Kč	152 × 69	Brown	Božena Němcová	Laureate woman	21 July 1993	31 January 2007	Indefinite
		500 Kč	152 × 69	Brown	Božena Němcová	Laureate woman	27 December 1995	1 July 2022	Indefinite
		500 Kč	152 × 69	Brown	Božena Němcová	Laureate woman	18 March 1998	1 July 2022	Indefinite
		1000 Kč	158 × 74	Violet	František Palacký	Archbishop's Castle, Kroměříž; eagle	12 May 1993	30 June 2001	Indefinite
		1000 Kč	158 × 74	Violet	František Palacký	Archbishop's Castle, Kroměříž; eagle	6 December 1996	1 July 2022	Indefinite
		2000 Kč	164 × 74	Green	Emmy Destinn	Euterpe; violin, cello	1 October 1996	1 July 2022	Indefinite
		2000 Kč	164 × 74	Green	Emmy Destinn	Euterpe; violin, cello	1 December 1999	1 July 2022	Indefinite
		5000 Kč	170 × 74	Grey	Tomáš Masaryk	St. Vitus Cathedral; Gothic and Baroque buildings, Prague	15 December 1993	30 June 2001	Indefinite
		5000 Kč	170 × 74	Grey	Tomáš Masaryk	St. Vitus Cathedral; Gothic and Baroque buildings, Prague	8 September 1999	Current	Indefinite
For table standards, see the banknote specification table.

=== Upgraded series ===
Upgraded series (1993)
Image		Value	Dimensions (mm)	Main colour	Description		Issue
Obverse	Reverse	Value	Dimensions (mm)	Main colour	Obverse	Reverse	Issue
		100 Kč	140 × 69	Turquoise	Charles IV	Charles University seal	5 September 2018
		200 Kč	146 × 69	Orange	John Amos Comenius	Orbis Pictus; Joined hands	5 September 2018
		500 Kč	152 × 69	Brown	Božena Němcová	Laureate woman	1 April 2009
		1000 Kč	158 × 74	Violet	František Palacký	Archbishop's Castle, Kroměříž; eagle	1 April 2008
		2000 Kč	164 × 74	Green	Emmy Destinn	Euterpe; violin and cello	2 July 2007
		5000 Kč	170 × 74	Grey	Tomáš Masaryk	St. Vitus Cathedral; Gothic and Baroque buildings, Prague	1 December 2009
		5000 Kč	170 × 74	Grey	Tomáš Masaryk	St. Vitus Cathedral; Gothic and Baroque buildings, Prague	23 October 2023
For table standards, see the banknote specification table.

=== Commemorative series ===
Commemorative banknotes
Image		Value	Dimensions (mm)	Main colour	Description		Issue
Obverse	Reverse	Value	Dimensions (mm)	Main colour	Obverse	Reverse	Issue
		100 Kč	140 × 69	Turquoise	Charles IV overprint on watermark area	Charles University seal	30 January 2019
		100 Kč	194 × 84	Gold	Alois Rašín	Czech National Bank building	31 January 2019
		100 Kč	194 × 84	Olive green	Karel Engliš	Clam-Gallas Palace	30 March 2022
		1000 Kč	158 × 74	Violet	František Palacký, overprint on watermark area	Archbishop's Castle, Kroměříž; eagle	8 February 2023
For table standards, see the banknote specification table.

== Exchange rates ==
=== Historic rates ===
EUR–CZK exchange rate since 1999

The currency had a record exchange rate run in 2008.

Most traded currencies (since 31 December 2008)
Year	(United States) US dollar	(Europe) Euro	(United Kingdom) Sterling	(Switzerland) Swiss franc	(Japan) Yen
2008	19.346	26.930	28.270	18.132	0.21348
2009	18.368	26.465	29.798	17.837	0.19875
2010	18.751	25.060	29.108	20.043	0.23058
2011	19.940	25.800	30.886	21.220	0.25754
2012	19.055	25.140	30.812	20.831	0.22130
2013	19.894	27.425	32.911	22.344	0.18957
2014	22.834	27.725	35.591	23.058	0.19090
2015	24.824	27.025	36.822	24.930	0.20619
2016	25.639	27.020	31.586	25.166	0.21907
2017	21.291	25.540	28.786	21.824	0.18915
2018	22.466	25.725	28.762	22.827	0.20447
2019	22.621	25.410	29.866	23.416	0.20844
2020	21.381	26.245	29.190	24.298	0.20747
2021	21.951	24.860	29.585	24.066	0.19069
2022	22.616	24.115	27.200	24.496	0.17152
2023	22.376	24.725	28.447	26.688	0.15811
2024	24.237	25.185	30.378	26.768	0.15449
Source: Czech National Bank exchange rates

=== Current rates ===
Current CZK exchange rates
From Google Finance:	AUD CAD CHF CNY EUR GBP HKD JPY USD PLN HUF
From Yahoo! Finance:	AUD CAD CHF CNY EUR GBP HKD JPY USD PLN HUF
From XE.com:	AUD CAD CHF CNY EUR GBP HKD JPY USD PLN HUF
From OANDA:	AUD CAD CHF CNY EUR GBP HKD JPY USD PLN HUF

== See also ==
- Bohemia and Moravia crown
- Commemorative coins of the Czech Republic
- Czech Republic and the euro
- Czechoslovak koruna
- Economy of the Czech Republic
- Slovak crown
