= Rašín (film) =

2018 Czech television series

- Written by: Jiří Svoboda
- Directed by: Jiří Svoboda
- Starring: Ondřej Vetchý
- Country of origin: Czech Republic
- Original language: Czech

Production
- Producer: Jan Maxa
- Cinematography: Marek Janda
- Editor: Jan Mattlach
- Running time: 142 minutes
- Production company: ČT

Original release
- Release: 14 October – 21 October 2018

Rašín is a 2018 Czech historical two-part television film directed by Jiří Svoboda. It stars Ondřej Vetchý as Rašín. The film heavily focuses on Rašín's relationship with Karel Kramář. It was originally scheduled for release on 28 October 2018, 100 years following the foundation of independent Czechoslovakia. Czech Television decided to divide the film to two parts, respectively premiered on 14 and 21 October.

== Cast ==
- Ondřej Vetchý as Alois Rašín
- Miroslav Donutil as Karel Kramář
- Zuzana Stivínová as Karla Rašínová
- Lenka Vlasáková as Naděžda Kramářová
- Tomáš Töpfer as Markus Preminger
- Viktor Preiss as Josef Scheiner
- Petr Štěpán as Přemysl Šámal
- Vítězslav Jandák as František Fiedler
- Ondřej Malý as Zdeněk Tobolka
- Jan Novotný as František Udržal
- Jiří Oberfalzer as Antonín Švehla
- Jaroslav Plesl as Edvard Beneš
