= List of prime ministers of Czechoslovakia =

Prime Minister of Czechoslovakia
- Předseda vlády Československa (Czech); Predseda vlády Česko-Slovenska (Slovak)
- Coat of arms

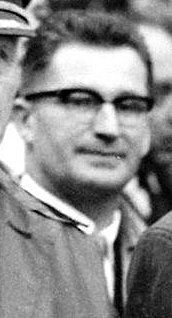
- Longest serving Lubomír Štrougal; 28 January 1970 – 12 October 1988
- Appointer: The president
- Formation: 14 November 1918; 107 years ago
- First holder: Karel Kramář
- Final holder: Jan Stráský
- Abolished: 31 December 1992; 33 years ago
- Superseded by: Prime Minister of the Czech Republic; Prime Minister of Slovakia

The prime minister of Czechoslovakia (Czech: předseda vlády Československa, Slovak: predseda vlády Česko-Slovenska) was the head of government of Czechoslovakia, from the creation of the First Czechoslovak Republic in 1918 until the dissolution of the Czech and Slovak Federative Republic on 1 January 1993.

During periods when the post of the president of Czechoslovakia was vacant, the prime minister took on most presidential duties. However, the Czechoslovak constitutions do not define anything like a post of acting president.

== Prime ministers of Czechoslovakia (1918–1992) ==
Political parties

Czech Constitutional Democracy (ČStD)
Czechoslovak National Democracy (ČsND)
Czechoslovak Social Democratic Party (ČSSD)
Republican Party of Farmers and Peasants (RSZML)
Party of National Unity (SNJ)
Czechoslovak People's Party (ČSL)
Communist Party of Czechoslovakia (KSČ)
Public Against Violence (VPN)
Civic Democratic Union (ODÚ)
Civic Democratic Party (ODS)

Other factions

Independent

No.	Portrait	Name (Birth–Death)	Ethnicity	Term of office			Party	Cabinet
No.	Portrait	Name (Birth–Death)	Ethnicity	Took office	Left office	Time in office	Party	Cabinet
First Czechoslovak Republic (1918–1938)
–		Tomáš Masaryk (1850–1937)	Czech	14 October 1918	14 November 1918	31 days	Independent	Provisional Government
1		Karel Kramář (1860–1937)	Czech	14 November 1918	8 July 1919	236 days	ČStD	Kramář
1		Karel Kramář (1860–1937)	Czech	14 November 1918	8 July 1919	236 days	ČsND	Kramář
2		Vlastimil Tusar (1880–1924)	Czech	8 July 1919	15 September 1920	1 year, 69 days	ČSSD	Tusar I–II
3		Jan Černý (1874–1959)	Czech	15 September 1920	26 September 1921	1 year, 11 days	Independent	Černý I
4		Edvard Beneš (1884–1948)	Czech	26 September 1921	7 October 1922	1 year, 11 days	Independent	Beneš
5		Antonín Švehla (1873–1933)	Czech	7 October 1922	18 March 1926	3 years, 162 days	RSZML	Švehla I–II
(3)		Jan Černý (1874–1959)	Czech	18 March 1926	12 October 1926	208 days	Independent	Černý II
(5)		Antonín Švehla (1873–1933)	Czech	12 October 1926	1 February 1929	2 years, 112 days	RSZML	Švehla III
6		František Udržal (1866–1938)	Czech	1 February 1929	24 October 1932	3 years, 266 days	RSZML	Udržal I–II
7		Jan Malypetr (1873–1947)	Czech	24 October 1932	5 November 1935	3 years, 12 days	RSZML	Malypetr I–II–III
8		Milan Hodža (1878–1944)	Slovak	5 November 1935	22 September 1938	2 years, 321 days	RSZML	Hodža I–II–III
Second Czechoslovak Republic (1938–1939)
9		Jan Syrový (1888–1970)	Czech	22 September 1938	1 December 1938	70 days	Independent	Syrový I–II
10		Rudolf Beran (1887–1954)	Czech	1 December 1938	15 March 1939	104 days	SNJ	Beran I
Occupation (1939–1945); Alois Eliáš became Prime Minister of the Protectorate of Bohemia and Moravia, a de jure autonomous region incorporated into Nazi Germany. Edvard Beneš became Chairman of the Czechoslovak National Council in London, which later became the Czechoslovak government-in-exile, the Czechoslovak government recognized by the Allies. Jozef Tiso became Prime Minister of the quasi-independent, pro-Nazi, and clero-fascist Slovak Republic. Julian Révaý became Prime Minister of the Carpatho-Ukraine for a few days before invasion and occupation by the Kingdom of Hungary.
Czechoslovak government-in-exile (1940–1945)
–		Jan Šrámek (1870–1956)	Czech	21 July 1940	5 April 1945	4 years, 258 days	ČSL	Šrámek I–II
Third Czechoslovak Republic (1945–1948)
11		Zdeněk Fierlinger (1891–1976)	Czech	5 April 1945	2 July 1946	1 year, 88 days	ČSSD	Fierlinger I–II
12		Klement Gottwald (1896–1953)	Czech	2 July 1946	15 June 1948	1 year, 349 days	KSČ	Gottwald I–II
Communist Era (1948–1989) Czechoslovak Republic (1948–1960), Czechoslovak Socialist Republic (1960–1989)
13		Antonín Zápotocký (1884–1957)	Czech	15 June 1948	14 March 1953	4 years, 272 days	KSČ	Zápotocký/Široký I
14		Viliam Široký (1902–1971)	Slovak	14 March 1953	20 September 1963	10 years, 190 days	KSČ	Zápotocký/Široký I–II–III
15		Jozef Lenárt (1923–2004)	Slovak	20 September 1963	8 April 1968	4 years, 201 days	KSČ	Lenárt
16		Oldřich Černík (1921–1994)	Czech	8 April 1968	28 January 1970	1 year, 295 days	KSČ	Černík I–II–III/Štrougal I
17		Lubomír Štrougal (1924–2023)	Czech	28 January 1970	12 October 1988	18 years, 258 days	KSČ	Černík III/Štrougal I–II–III–IV–V–VI
18		Ladislav Adamec (1926–2007)	Czech	12 October 1988	10 December 1989	1 year, 59 days	KSČ	Adamec
Post–Communist Era (1989–1992) Czechoslovak Socialist Republic (1989–1990), Czech and Slovak Federative Republic (1990–1992)
19		Marián Čalfa (born 1946)	Slovak	10 December 1989	2 July 1992	2 years, 205 days	KSČ	Čalfa I–II
19		Marián Čalfa (born 1946)	Slovak	10 December 1989	2 July 1992	2 years, 205 days	VPN	Čalfa I–II
19		Marián Čalfa (born 1946)	Slovak	10 December 1989	2 July 1992	2 years, 205 days	ODÚ	Čalfa I–II
20		Jan Stráský (1940–2019)	Czech	2 July 1992	31 December 1992	182 days	ODS	Stráský

== See also ==
- List of heads of the Czech state
  - List of Bohemian monarchs
  - List of political office-holders in the Protectorate of Bohemia and Moravia
  - List of presidents of Czechoslovakia
  - President of the Czech Republic
    - List of presidents of the Czech Republic
  - Prime Minister of the Czech Republic
    - List of prime ministers of the Czech Republic
  - President of Slovakia
  - Prime Minister of Slovakia
- List of Czech presidential pets
