= Tusar =

Tusar is a surname. Notable people with the surname include:

- Lysanne Tusar, Canadian businesswoman
- Vlastimil Tusar (1880–1924), Czech journalist
- Md Tusar Akon (1999–), Material scientist
