= First Czechoslovak Republic =

Czechoslovak state from 1918 to 1938

Czechoslovak Republic Československá republika
- 1918–1938
- Flag; Top (1918–1920); Bottom (1920–1938) Middle coat of arms (1920–1938)
- Motto: Pravda vítězí / Pravda víťazí "Truth prevails"
- Anthem: Kde domov můj and Nad Tatrou sa blýska
- The Czechoslovak Republic in 1933
- Capital and largest city: Prague
- Official languages: Czechoslovak
- Common languages: List: Czechoslovak (Czech · Slovak), German, Hungarian, Rusyn, Romani, Polish, Yiddish
- Demonym: Czechoslovak
- Government: Unitary parliamentary republic
- President
  - 1918–1935: Tomáš Masaryk
  - 1935–1938: Edvard Beneš
- Prime Minister
  - 1918–1919 (first): Karel Kramář
  - 1938 (last): Jan Syrový
- Legislature: National Assembly
  - Upper house: Senate
  - Lower house: Chamber of Deputies
- Historical era: Interwar period
  - Independence declared: 18 October 1918
  - Independence proclaimed: 28 October 1918
  - Constitution adopted: 29 February 1920
  - Munich Agreement: 30 September 1938

Area
  - Total: 140,800 km^{2} (54,400 sq mi)

Population
  - 1921: 13,410,750
  - 1938: 14,800,000
- Currency: Czechoslovak koruna
Preceded by
Austria-Hungary
Succeeded by
Second Czechoslovak Republic
Reichsgau Sudetenland
Kingdom of Hungary
Second Polish Republic
- Today part of: Czech Republic; Slovakia; Ukraine

The First Czechoslovak Republic, (Note: Czech: První československá republika; Slovak: Prvá československá republika) often colloquially referred to as the First Republic, (Note: Czech: První republika; Slovak: Prvá republika) was the first Czechoslovak state that existed from 1918 to 1938, a union of ethnic Czechs and Slovaks. The country was commonly called Czechoslovakia, (Note: Czech and Slovak: Československo) a compound of Czech and Slovak; which gradually became the most widely used name for its successor states. It was composed of former territories of Austria-Hungary, inheriting different systems of administration from the formerly Austrian (Bohemia, Moravia, a small part of Silesia) and Hungarian territories (mostly Upper Hungary and Carpathian Ruthenia).

After 1933, Czechoslovakia remained the only functioning democracy in Central Europe, organized as a parliamentary republic. Under pressure from its German minority, supported by neighbouring Nazi Germany, Czechoslovakia was forced to cede its Sudetenland region to Germany on 1 October 1938 as part of the Munich Agreement. It also ceded southern parts of Slovakia and Carpathian Ruthenia to Hungary and the Trans-Olza region in Silesia to Poland. This, in effect, ended the First Czechoslovak Republic. It was replaced by the Second Czechoslovak Republic, which lasted less than half a year before Germany occupied the rest of Czechoslovakia in March 1939.

== History ==
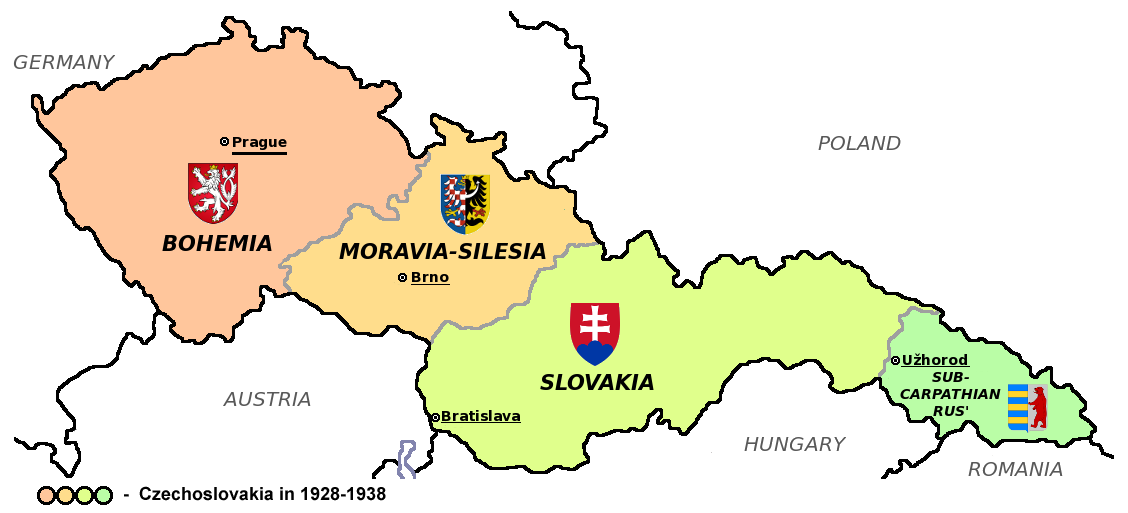
Czechoslovakia during the interwar period

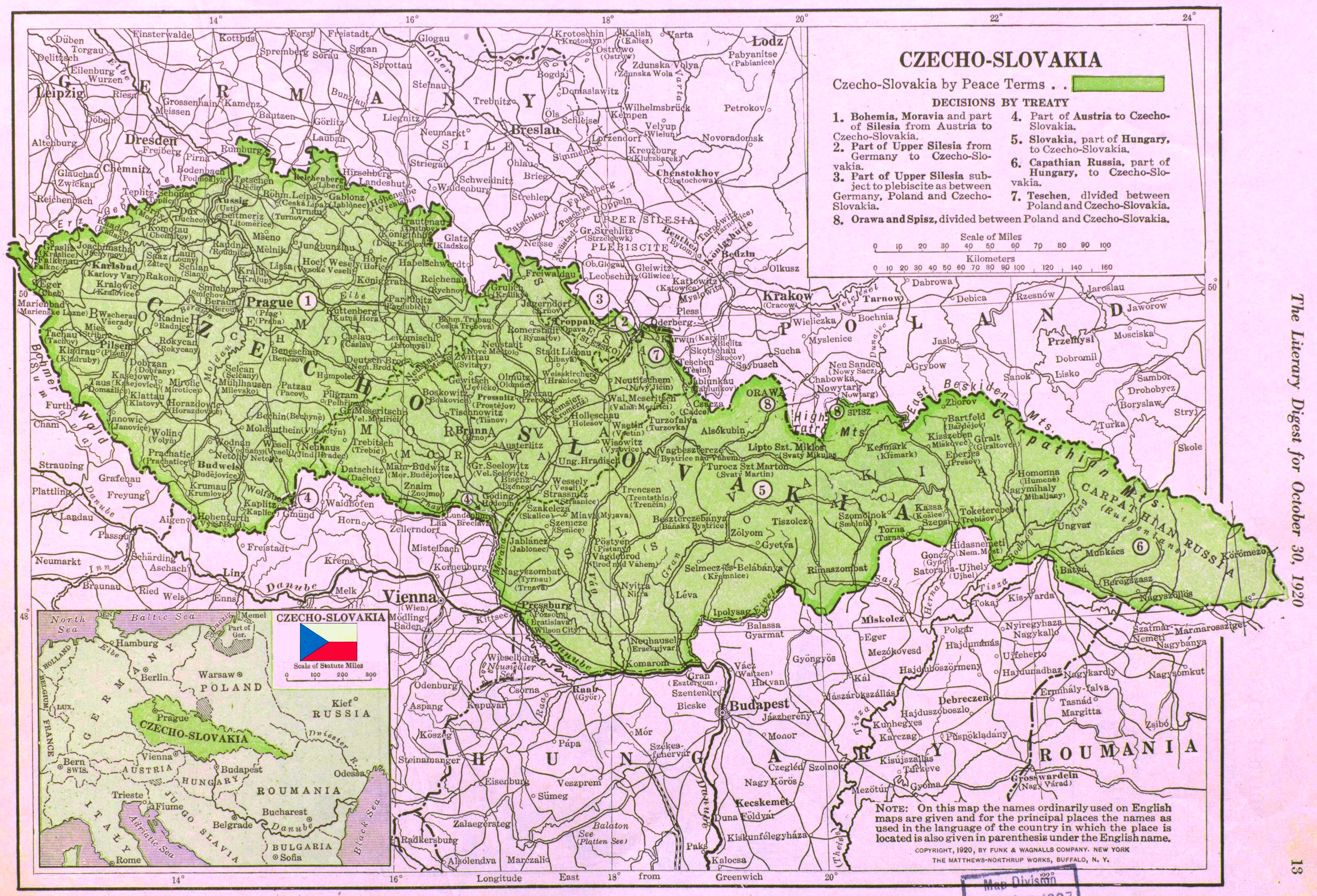
"Czecho-Slovakia by Peace Terms" in 1920 indicates contributions of surrounding countries to the territory of the new state.

The independence of Czechoslovakia was proclaimed on 28 October 1918 in Prague. Several ethnic groups and territories with different historical, political, and economic traditions were obliged to be blended into a new state structure. The economy of the new Czechoslovak Republic had a reasonable future because Slovak agriculture could sustain the population and Czech industry gained access to the Danube trade route. But the new republic was multinational and had to accommodate a sizable German minority, a Hungarian minority, as well as the religious ethnic Ruthenians. The origin of the First Republic lies in Point 10 of Woodrow Wilson's Fourteen Points: "The peoples of Austria-Hungary, whose place among the nations we wish to see safeguarded and assured, should be accorded the freest opportunity to autonomous development."

The full boundaries of the country and the organization of its government was finally established in the Czechoslovak Constitution of 1920. Tomáš Masaryk had been recognized by World War I Allies as the leader of the Provisional Czechoslovak Government, and in 1920 he was elected the country's first president. He was re-elected in 1925 and 1929, serving as president until 14 December 1935 when he resigned due to poor health. He was succeeded by Edvard Beneš.

Following the Anschluss of Austria by Germany in March 1938, the Nazi leader Adolf Hitler's next target for annexation was Czechoslovakia. His pretext was the privations suffered by ethnic German populations living in Czechoslovakia's northern and western border regions, known collectively as the Sudetenland. Their incorporation into Nazi Germany would leave the rest of Czechoslovakia powerless to resist subsequent occupation.

== Politics ==
To a large extent, Czechoslovak democracy was held together by the country's first president, Tomáš Masaryk. As the principal founding father of the republic, Masaryk was regarded similar to the way George Washington is regarded in the United States. Such universal respect enabled Masaryk to overcome seemingly irresolvable political problems. Masaryk is still regarded as the symbol of Czechoslovak democracy for the Czechs and Slovaks today.

The Constitution of 1920 approved the provisional constitution of 1918 in its basic features. The Czechoslovak state was conceived as a unitary parliamentary democracy, guided primarily by the National Assembly, consisting of the Senate and the Chamber of Deputies, whose members were to be elected on the basis of universal suffrage. The National Assembly was responsible for legislative initiative and was given supervisory control over the executive and judiciary as well. Every seven years it elected the president and confirmed the cabinet appointed by him. Executive power was to be shared by the president and the cabinet; the latter, responsible to the National Assembly, was to prevail. The reality differed somewhat from this ideal, however, during the strong presidencies of Masaryk and his successor, Beneš. The constitution of 1920 provided for the central government to have a high degree of control over local government. From 1928 to 1940, Czechoslovakia was divided into the four "lands" (Czech: "země", Slovak: "krajiny"): Bohemia, Moravia-Silesia, Slovakia, and Carpathian Ruthenia. Although in 1927 assemblies were provided for Bohemia, Slovakia, and Ruthenia, their jurisdiction was limited to adjusting laws and regulations of the central government to local needs. The central government appointed one third of the members of these assemblies. The constitution identified the "Czechoslovak nation" as the creator and principal constituent of the Czechoslovak state and established Czech and Slovak as official languages. The concept of the Czechoslovak nation was necessary in order to justify the establishment of Czechoslovakia towards the world, because otherwise the statistical majority of the Czechs as compared to Germans would have been rather weak, and there were more Germans in the state than Slovaks. National minorities were assured special protection; in districts where they constituted 20% of the population, members of minority groups were granted full freedom to use their language in everyday life, in schools, and in matters dealing with authorities.

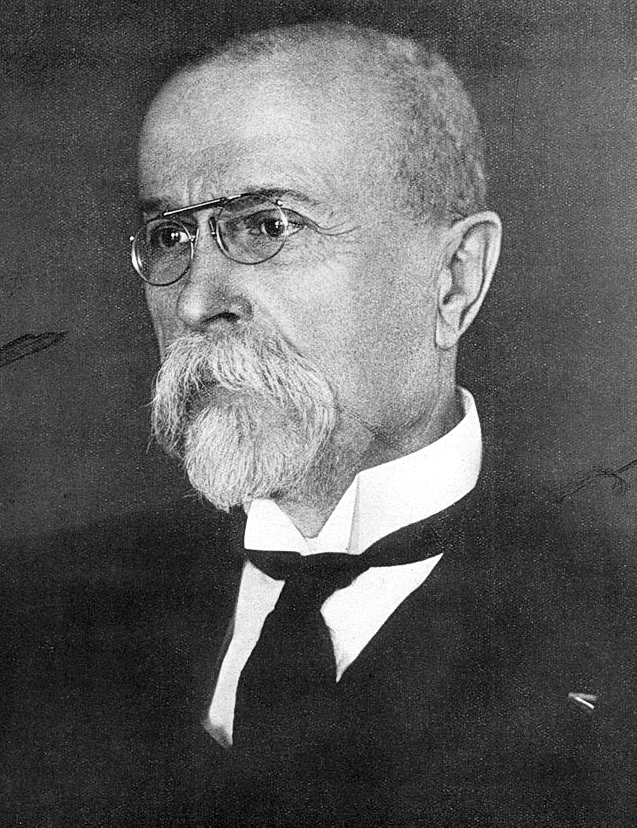
Tomáš Masaryk, the founding father and first President of the Czechoslovak Republic

The operation of the new Czechoslovak government was distinguished by stability. Largely responsible for this were the well-organized political parties that emerged as the real centers of power. Excluding the period from March 1926 to November 1929, a coalition of five Czechoslovak parties constituted the backbone of the government:

- The Republican Party of Agricultural and Smallholder People was formed in 1922 from a merger of the Czech Agrarian Party and the Slovak Agrarian Party. Led by Svehla, the new party became the principal voice for the agrarian population, representing mainly peasants with small and medium-sized farms. Svehla combined support for progressive social legislation with a democratic outlook. This party was the core of all government coalitions between 1922 and 1938.
- The Czechoslovak Social Democratic Party was considerably weakened when the Communists seceded in 1921, but by 1929 it had begun to regain its strength. A party of moderation, the Czechoslovak Social Democratic Party declared in favor of parliamentary democracy in 1930. Antonín Hampl was chairman of the party, and Ivan Dérer was the leader of its Slovak branch.
- The Czechoslovak National Social Party (called the Czech Socialist Party until 1926) was created before World War I when it split from the Social Democratic Party. It rejected class struggle and promoted nationalism. Led by Václav Klofáč, its membership derived primarily from the lower middle class, civil servants, and the intelligentsia (including Beneš).
- The Czechoslovak People's Party – a fusion of several Catholic parties, groups, and labor unions – developed separately in Bohemia in 1918 and in the more strongly Catholic Moravia in 1919. In 1922 a common executive committee was formed, headed by Jan Šrámek. The Czechoslovak People's Party espoused Christian moral principles and the social encyclicals of Pope Leo XIII.
- The Czechoslovak National Democratic Party developed from a post–World War I merger of the Young Czech Party with other right wing and center parties. Ideologically, it was characterized by national radicalism and economic liberalism. Led by Kramář and Alois Rašín, the Czechoslovak National Democratic Party became the party of big business, banking, and industry. The party declined in influence after 1920, however.

The leaders of these parties became known as the "Pětka" (pron. pyetka) (The Five). The Pětka was headed by Antonín Švehla, who held the office of prime minister for most of the 1920s and designed a pattern of coalition politics that survived until 1938. The coalition's policy was expressed in the slogan "We have agreed that we will agree." German parties also participated in the government in the beginning of 1926. Hungarian parties, influenced by irredentist propaganda from Hungary, never joined the Czechoslovak government but were not openly hostile.

== Foreign policy ==
Edvard Beneš, Czechoslovak foreign minister from 1918 to 1935, created the system of alliances that determined the republic's international stance until 1938. A democratic statesman of Western orientation, Beneš relied heavily on the League of Nations as guarantor of the post war status quo and the security of newly formed states. He negotiated the Little Entente (an alliance with Yugoslavia and Romania) in 1921 to counter Hungarian revanchism and Habsburg restoration. He concluded a separate alliance with France. Beneš's Western policy received a serious blow as early as 1925. The Locarno Pact, which paved the way for Germany's admission to the League of Nations, guaranteed Germany's western border but provided no such promise for its eastern frontier, which meant that it would remain subject to negotiation. When Adolf Hitler came to power in 1933, fear of German aggression became widespread in eastern Central Europe. Beneš ignored the possibility of a stronger Central European alliance system, remaining faithful to his Western policy. He did, however, seek the participation of the Soviet Union in an alliance to include France. (Beneš's earlier attitude towards the Soviet regime had been one of caution.) In 1935, the Soviet Union signed treaties with France and Czechoslovakia. In essence, the treaties provided that the Soviet Union would come to Czechoslovakia's aid only if French assistance came first.

In 1935, when Beneš succeeded Masaryk as president, the prime minister Milan Hodža took over the Ministry of Foreign Affairs. Hodža's efforts to strengthen alliances in Central Europe came too late. In February 1936, the foreign ministry came under the direction of Kamil Krofta, an adherent of Beneš's line.

The Czechoslovak Republic sold armament to Bolivia during the Chaco War with Paraguay (1932–35) and sent, close to the end of the war, an unofficial training mission, to support Bolivia in the war and advance Czechoslovak interests in Bolivia.

== Economy ==
The new nation had a population of over 13.5 million. It had inherited 70 to 80% of all the industry of the Austro-Hungarian Empire, including the porcelain and glass industries and the sugar refineries; more than 40% of all its distilleries and breweries; the Škoda Works of Plzeň, which produced armaments, locomotives, automobiles, and machinery; and the chemical industry of northern Bohemia. Seventeen percent of all Hungarian industry that had developed in Slovakia during the late 19th century also fell to the republic. Czechoslovakia was one of the world's 10 most industrialized states.

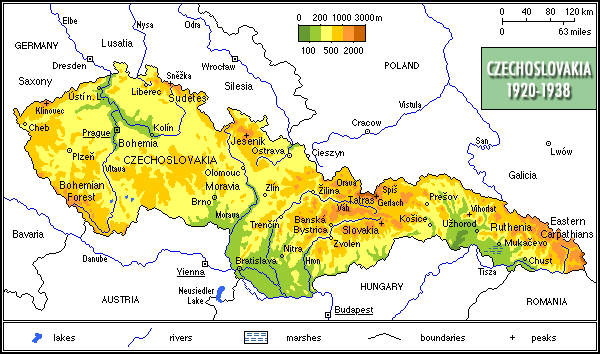
Czechoslovakia, 1920–1938

The Czech lands were far more industrialized than Slovakia. In Bohemia, Moravia, and Silesia, 39% of the population was employed in industry and 31% in agriculture and forestry. Most light and heavy industry was located in the Sudetenland and was owned by Germans and controlled by German-owned banks. Czechs controlled only 20 to 30% of all industry. In Slovakia, 17.1% of the population was employed in industry, and 60.4% worked in agriculture and forestry. Only 5% of all industry in Slovakia was in Slovak hands. Carpathian Ruthenia was essentially without industry.

In the agricultural sector, a program of reform introduced soon after the establishment of the republic was intended to rectify the unequal distribution of land. One-third of all agricultural land and forests belonged to a few aristocratic landowners — mostly Germans (or Germanized Czechs – e.g. Kinsky, Czernin or Kaunitz) and Hungarians—and the Catholic Church. Half of all holdings were under 20,000 m^{2}. The Land Control Act of April 1919 called for the expropriation of all estates exceeding 1.5 square kilometres of arable land or 2.5 square kilometres of land in general (5 square kilometres to be the absolute maximum). Land reform was to proceed on a gradual basis; owners would continue in possession in the interim, and compensation was offered.

== Ethnic groups ==
1921 ethnonational census

Regions	Czechoslovaks (Czechs and Slovaks)	Germans	Hungarians	Rusyns	Jews	Others	Total
Bohemia	4,382,788	2,173,239	5,476	2,007	11,251	93,757	6,668,518
Moravia	2,048,426	547,604	534	976	15,335	46,448	2,649,323
Silesia	296,194	252,365	94	338	3,681	49,530	602,202
Slovakia	2,013,792	139,900	637,183	85,644	70,529	42,313	2,989,361
Carpathian Ruthenia	19,737	10,460	102,144	372,884	80,059	6,760	592,044
Czechoslovakia	8,760,937	3,123,568	745,431	461,849	180,855	238,080	13,410,750

National disputes arose due to the fact that the more numerous Czechs dominated the central government and other national institutions, all of which had their seats in the Bohemian capital Prague. The Slovak middle class had been extremely small in 1919 because Hungarians, Germans and Jews had previously filled most administrative, professional and commercial positions in, and as a result, Czechs were posted to the more backward Slovakia to take up the administrative and professional posts. The position of the Jewish community, especially in Slovakia, was ambiguous and, increasingly, a significant part looked towards Zionism.

Furthermore, most of Czechoslovakia's industry was as well located in Bohemia and Moravia and there mainly in the German speaking Borderlands, while most of Slovakia's economy came from agriculture. In Carpatho-Ukraine, the situation was even worse, with basically no industry at all. Therefore, the borderlands were also more heavily hit by the world economic crisis. This fact, and the fact that the central government did little to help out and even supported more the Czech companies led to the fact, that unemployment among the German community was the double, than it was among the Czech. Further steps like the loss of jobs for German speaking state employees, who did not speak Czech, which were employed earlier in the old Austrian Empire or expropriations of big estates did not support the coherence within the state. Nevertheless, still in 1929, for example, in the Carlsbad district, a mainly German speaking area, 46% still voted for Socialists and Communists. This is especially interesting, because the German-speaking community of the Sudetenland was even after many decades blamed for being nationalist and fascist. But the population of one of the most industrialized areas of Europe brought a big support for Communist and Socialist parties, which may also be explained by heavy and long lasting traditions of mining industries in the area.

Still, nationalism arose amongst the non-Czech nationalities, and several parties and movements were formed with the aim of broader political autonomy, as the Sudeten German Party led by Konrad Henlein and the Hlinka's Slovak People's Party led by Andrej Hlinka.

The German minority living in the Sudetenland demanded autonomy from the Czechoslovak government, complaining they were oppressed. In the 1935 Parliamentary elections, the newly founded Sudeten German Party, led by Konrad Henlein and mostly financed by Nazi German money, received over two-thirds of the Sudeten German vote. As a consequence, diplomatic relations between the Germans and the Czechs deteriorated further.

Subsequently, interwar Czechoslovakia has been idealized by its proponents as the only bastion of democracy surrounded by authoritarian and fascist regimes − this is called the Czechoslovakia myth. It has also been condemned by its detractors as an artificial, Czech-dominated and unworkable creation of intellectuals supported by the great victorious powers of the First World War, notably the French Third Republic and the British Empire. Interwar Czechoslovakia comprised lands and peoples that were far from being integrated into a modern nation-state. Moreover, the dominant Czechs were not able to cope with the demands of other nationalities.

== Administrative divisions ==
- 1918–1923: different systems in former Austrian territory (Bohemia, Moravia, a small part of Silesia) compared to former Hungarian territory (mostly Upper Hungary and Carpathian Ruthenia): three lands (země) (also called district units (kraje): Bohemia, Moravia, Silesia, plus 21 counties (župy) in today's Slovakia and three counties in today's Ruthenia; both lands and counties were divided into districts (okresy).
- 1923–1927: as above, except that the Slovak and Ruthenian counties were replaced by six (grand) counties ((veľ)župy) in Slovakia and one (grand) county in Ruthenia, and the numbers and boundaries of the okresy were changed in those two territories.
- 1928–1938: four lands (Czech: země, Slovak: krajiny): Bohemia, Moravia-Silesia, Slovakia and Carpathian Ruthenia, divided into districts (okresy).

== See also ==
- Germans in Czechoslovakia (1918–1938)
- Hungarians in Slovakia
- Polish minority in the Czech Republic
- Ruthenians and Ukrainians in Czechoslovakia (1918–1938)
- Slovaks in Czechoslovakia (1918–38)

== Bibliography ==
- Kárník, Zdeněk: Malé dějiny československé (1867–1939), Dokořán (2008), Praha, ISBN 978-80-7363-146-8 (in Czech)
- Olivová, Věra: Dějiny první republiky, Karolinum Press (2000), Praha, ISBN 80-7184-791-7 (in Czech)
- Peroutka, Ferdinand: Budování státu I.-IV., Academia (2003), Praha, ISBN 80-200-1121-8 (in Czech)
- Gen. František Moravec: Špión jemuž nevěřili ISBN 80-200-1006-8 (in Czech)
- Axworthy, Mark W.A. Axis Slovakia—Hitler's Slavic Wedge, 1938–1945, Bayside, N.Y. : Axis Europa Books, 2002, ISBN 1-891227-41-6
