= Czechoslovak National Council =

Organization of Czech and Slovak émigrés during World War I

Flag of the Czechoslovak National Council

The Czechoslovak National Council (or Czecho-Slovak National Council) was an organization founded by Czech and Slovak émigrés during World War I to liberate their homeland from Austria-Hungary. During the closing weeks of the war, the Czechoslovak National Council was formally upgraded to a provisional government and its members were designated to hold top offices in the First Czechoslovak Republic.

== Background ==
The homelands of the Czechs and Slovaks entered the Habsburg domains in 1526. The notion of union between Czechs in Austria and Slovaks in Hungary took root among some Czech leaders around the turn of the twentieth century. However, the proposal did not gain widespread appeal among the two peoples until well into the First World War.

== World War I Activity ==
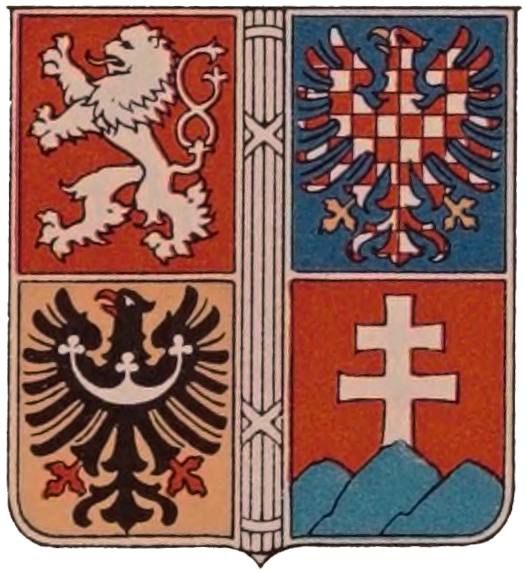
Coat of Arms of the Czechoslovak National Council

When World War I broke out in August 1914, Czech and Slovak émigrés residing in many Allied and neutral countries formed organizations to express their loyalty to the Allied cause and to spare their members internment. In early 1915 a Czech living in Russia, Svatopluk Koníček, made the first attempt to bring these various groups together under a single umbrella organization. His project, however, failed to bridge the differences between liberal, democratic Czech and Slovak groups and those with a more conservative, Pan-Slav outlook.

Tomáš Garrigue Masaryk, a Moravian professor (on Charles University in Prague, from 1882) and politician who went into exile in Switzerland in December 1914, gradually secured the support of the Czech and Slovak groups in Western Europe during the following months. On 14 November 1915 his organization, calling itself the Czech Committee Abroad, published a manifesto declaring war on Austria-Hungary. Shortly afterwards, the Czech Committee Abroad was reconstituted as the Czecho-Slovak National Council.

The Czechoslovak National Council originally consisted of Masaryk and another Czech political exile, Josef Dürich, as co-chairmen. Edvard Beneš, who joined Masaryk in exile in September 1915, was named the organization’s general secretary. Milan Štefánik, a Slovak who was an aviator in the French Army, was designated to represent Slovak interests in the national council. The headquarters of the Czechoslovak National Council was in Paris, France, while branch offices were eventually opened up in other Allied countries.

In 1916, Dürich journeyed to Russia with the purpose of establishing the Czechoslovak National Council’s authority over the Czech and Slovak groups there. Shortly after his arrival in that country, however, he began to support the tsarist government’s plans for a new émigré organization with the goal of rendering the Czech and Slovak homelands dependent or closely aligned with the Russian Empire after the war. Eventually, Dürich was expelled from the Paris-based Czechoslovak National Council and formed his own national council in Russia which was directly funded by the tsarist government. In the meantime, the Czech and Slovak groups in Russia were divided between pro-Dürich and pro-Masaryk camps.

Masaryk emerged as the victor from this rivalry after the outbreak of the Russian Revolution in March 1917 deprived Dürich and his group of the tsarist government’s support. Masaryk traveled to Russia later that year and established a Russian branch of the Czechoslovak National Council, which was crucial in organizing the Czechoslovak Legion in Russia.

Elsewhere, the Czechoslovak National Council continued to generate anti-Habsburg propaganda in Allied countries, organized Czechoslovak legions in France and Italy, and guided revolutionary activity in Bohemia through secret messages to Maffia, an underground organization formed in Prague during the war.

== Upgrade to Provisional Government ==
During the summer of 1918, the Czechoslovak National Council made significant headway in its campaign to gain recognition from Allied governments. On 1 July French President Raymond Poincaré granted the Czecho-Slovaks a special diplomatic charter. The British government followed on 9 August with an official statement which recognized the Czechoslovak National Council “as the trustee of the future Czecho-Slovak Government”. The United States went a step further the next month by recognizing the Czechoslovak National Council as a de facto government.

On 14 October 1918 Beneš formally upgraded the Czechoslovak National Council to the Czechoslovak provisional government, a move which was promptly recognized by France. At that time, Masaryk was designated president of the republic, Beneš was to serve as acting foreign minister and Štefánik as acting minister of war. This arrangement was accepted by Czech leaders in Prague who declared their independence on 28 October. Two days later, Slovak leaders approved their inclusion in the new Czechoslovak state at a meeting held at Turčiansky Svätý Martin.

== World War II Activity ==
After Nazi Germany completed its annexation of Bohemia and Moravia in March 1939, Beneš formed a new Czechoslovak National Council in exile, this time based out of London. This organization formed the Czechoslovak government-in-exile which was given de jure recognition by the Allies in 1941.

== See also ==
- Polish National Committee (1917–1919)
- Yugoslav Committee
- Romanian National Committee (1918)
