= National Unification (Czechoslovakia) =

National Unification Národní sjednocení
- Leader: Karel Kramář
- Founded: 27 October 1934
- Dissolved: 22 November 1938
- Merger of: National Democracy; National League; National Front
- Merged into: Party of National Unity
- Headquarters: Prague, Czechoslovakia
- Newspaper: The National Newspaper
- Ideology: National conservatism Czechoslovak nationalism
- Political position: Right-wing to far-right
- Colours: Blue

The National Unification (Czech: Národní sjednocení) was a political party created on 27 October 1934 in Czechoslovakia. The party was established by a merger of the Czechoslovak National Democracy and two marginal parties, National League and National Front.

The party politically cooperated with the Vlajka movement. After German occupation of Czechoslovakia, the party was merged into Party of National Unity.

== See also ==
- History of Czechoslovakia
- Národní sdružení odborových organizací – the labour wing of the party
