= Omladina Trial =

1894 trial in Prague

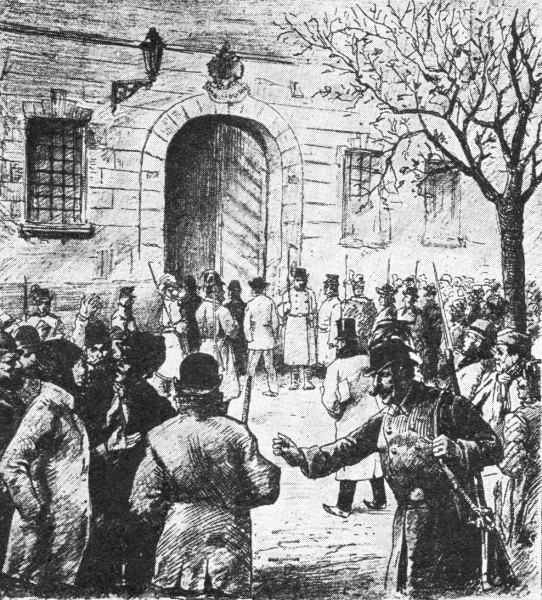
Contemporary illustration of the Omladina trial

In 1894, the Omladina Trial, convened in the Austro-Hungarian regional capital of Prague, ostensibly placed Czech anarchism and anarcho-syndicalism before the court as well as specifically convicting 68 Czech Nationalists of radical activities.

== Advent of Czech radicalism ==
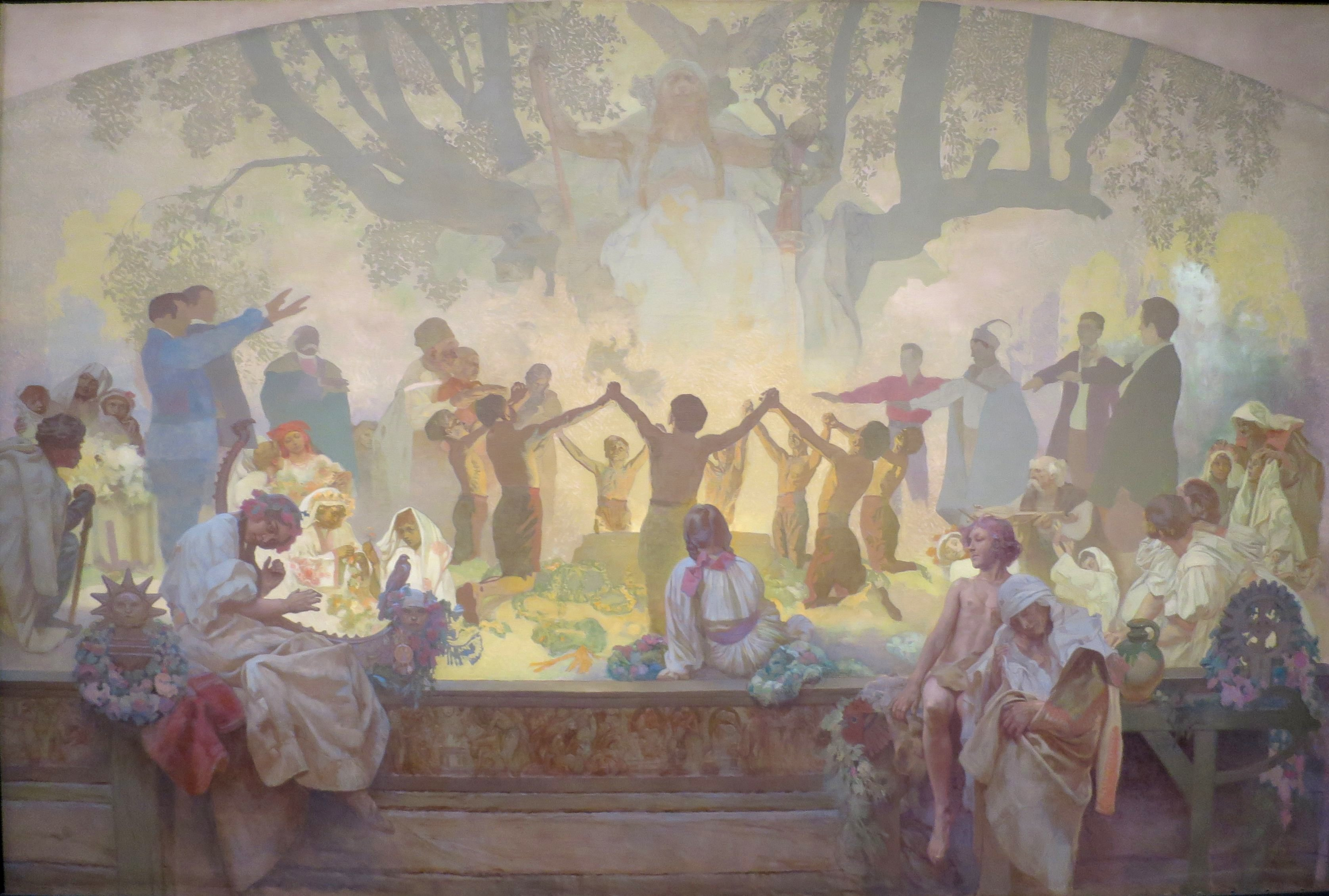
Alphonse Mucha's The Slav Epic cycle No.18: The Oath of Omladina under the Slavic Linden Tree: The Slavic Revival (1926)

Since the European Revolutions of 1848, the face of Central Europe became even more inundated with encompassing enlightenment ideals. In what was Austria-Hungary or the old Habsburg imperial lands, Bohemian rebels and their associates began to factionalize and represent many different political sects of the distinct, multi-ethnic nation emphasizing those enlightenment philosophies. What became a Pan-Slavic movement derived from the ideologies of the past French Revolutions in 1789.

By 1871, Serbia became embroiled in a middle class development that was stunted by a slow economy, as well as grew overwhelmingly in urban populations. This laboring, more working class bourgeoisie espoused a liberal ideology that seemed revolutionary to Austrian-Hungarian imperial control. Furthermore, a fettered peasantry loomed in the lower rung of Serbia, and philosophies of liberalism, romanticism, and radicalism stirred the minds of the aspiring youth. Ideologies of force and war became mechanisms through which the Serbs and other minorities believed could relinquish themselves from the burdens of economic disconnectedness and political repression.

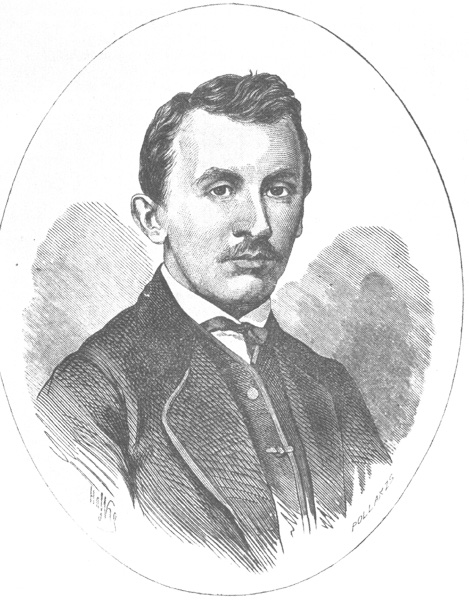
Svetozar Marković

One of the men who contributed to this movement and led to the Omladina Trials was Serb gentryman Svetozar Marković (1846–1875). As a young, vibrant leader of the evolving radicalists, he took center stage in the intellectual, economic, and political changes that would ensue in the following decades. He urged the organization of a radicalist party to wage "a struggle against everything which has grown too old- a struggle of the young generation against the old".

Other future Social Democrats and Progressives joined the movement including F. V. Lorenz and Antonín Pravoslav Veselý as editors. Furthermore, Jan Neruda brought his radicalist ideas as a spokesperson of the Young Czech Party from his days working at Národní listy, a successful, progressive newspaper of the mid-19th century.

== Omladina and its development ==
As Bohemian (Czech) radicalism reached its climax, many within the Central European region attached themselves to this growing ideology that sought to progressively incorporate all citizens into a political environment. The Young Czech Party also known as the National Liberal Party (formed in 1874) advocated universal manhood suffrage, and urged the adoption of civil liberties. Under its political wing, as a more radical, underground group, Omladina arose in the late 1870s in the industrial city of Kladno. Using periodicals and reformist newspapers, the educated, middle class liberals and radicals trumpeted their support for a sovereign parliament, freedom of the press and assembly, and implored vigorously for the protection of workers. Cooperation between these students and laborers in the movement flourished at unprecedented levels and progressive journals such as Omladina, Rozhledy, and Javnost began to call for workers reform incessantly. Not surprisingly, the government and its church affiliates deemed Omladina and such reformist groups as illegal, imprisoned many protestors and editors, and even arrested students possessing progressive literature. Debates exploded across the country, and Czech Socialists and Progressives vociferated their anger and discontent through debate and political societies. Events in 1871 like the Paris Commune and demonstrations of political activism prepared the Habsburg monarchy for similar events in their own land.

== The trials ==
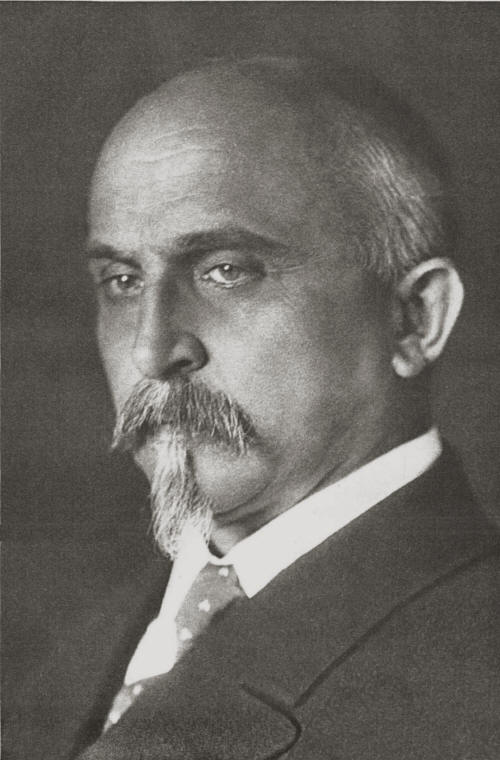
Alois Rašín

The National Liberal Party began to develop a small backing in the Austrian-Hungarian Parliament; Young Czechs had an avenue for vocal opposition. In the Bohemian Diet as well, the Young Czechs made a dramatic growth, defeating their rivals by 11 seats. Their storms of protest began gaining attention in the Habsburg monarchy and in the Austro-Hungarian government. They began to aggressively demand for universal suffrage due to their relationship with the workers but also acknowledged the fact that such legislation or change would bring the NLP thousands of adherents, including the working class. Scholars such as Alois Rašín of the Progressive movement, Antonín Hajn, and Jan Slavík concurred, and on March 17, 1893, Slavík presented the universal suffrage bill to the Parliament. Opposition mounted and demonstrations followed. June 18, 1893, saw a crowd of 30,000 while on May 15 (St. John's Day), a group of students draped a huge noose around a statue of Emperor Franz I. the straw that broke the camel's back occurred on December 23, 1893. A change in governments due to political inefficiency brought a new political regime headed by Prince Alfred Windischgrätz. His hardline approach and the newly drawn Reichsrat (lower house of Cisleithanian parliament) voted 185 to 73 to uphold a state of emergency in Fürst von Thun's Bohemia. The Governor declared a proverbial martial law and after a political murder on 23 December, Omladina was connected to the murder of police informer Rudolf Mrva. With a carte blanche to prosecute, the government arrested 76 Omladina "conspirators" aged 17–22 and charged two working class Omladina members with the actual murder. While the Czech press, and radical groups quickly denounced the murder, the government pressed onward. Josef Soukup aptly stated that the Mrva case was "the one tare among the wheat". The trial began on January 15, 1894, in a closed military tribunal. Charges ranged from conspiracy to high treason to public disorder to revolutionary activities. Prominent progressives such as Dr. Alois Rašín and Josef Škába were among the incarcerated. The sentences came as highly anticlimactic with the six defendants of the murder case itself received ten years each. 62 other defendants received sporadic jail sentences that collectively accumulated 90 years in prison.

== Consequences of the trial ==
The Young Czechs began to dissociate from the main party and radicalist actions subsided for a period of time. The National Liberal Party was banned from the local Diet and many newspapers were censored. Národní Listy, Javnost, and Omladina faced increasingly harsh government restrictions. The government increased severe measures against the minority and the Progressive movement was momentarily halted.

The long-term effects were the growing disillusioned populace and their unbelievable detestation of the upper class and the Habsburg authority. The liberals turned radicals became increasingly more vicious and while the Trials surely slowed their growth, the vehement sentiments of socialism and radicalism remained. Through their leadership, their views spread throughout the empire and factionalized according to certain groups and sects, igniting the "powder keg" so often utilized by World War I historians. Czech radicalism of the late Habsburg period imparted a very mixed legacy to the new state, a legacy that often compromised political stability. On one hand, the Czechs emerged from the Trial and its aftermaths with a political structure that included a variety of parties with complex infrastructures necessary in a modern political society. However, their nationalistic fervor often dampened their willingness to compromise, damaging the Austro-Hungarian and Central European stability, thus culminating in the outbreak of the War.

As Historian Bruce Garver explains:

"Though young Czech radicalism had been discredited, a new radical generation had been formed which constituted a greater danger to the Habsburgs because it aspired to establish genuinely popular political parties aiming at social as well as political reforms".
