= Valdice =

- Municipality
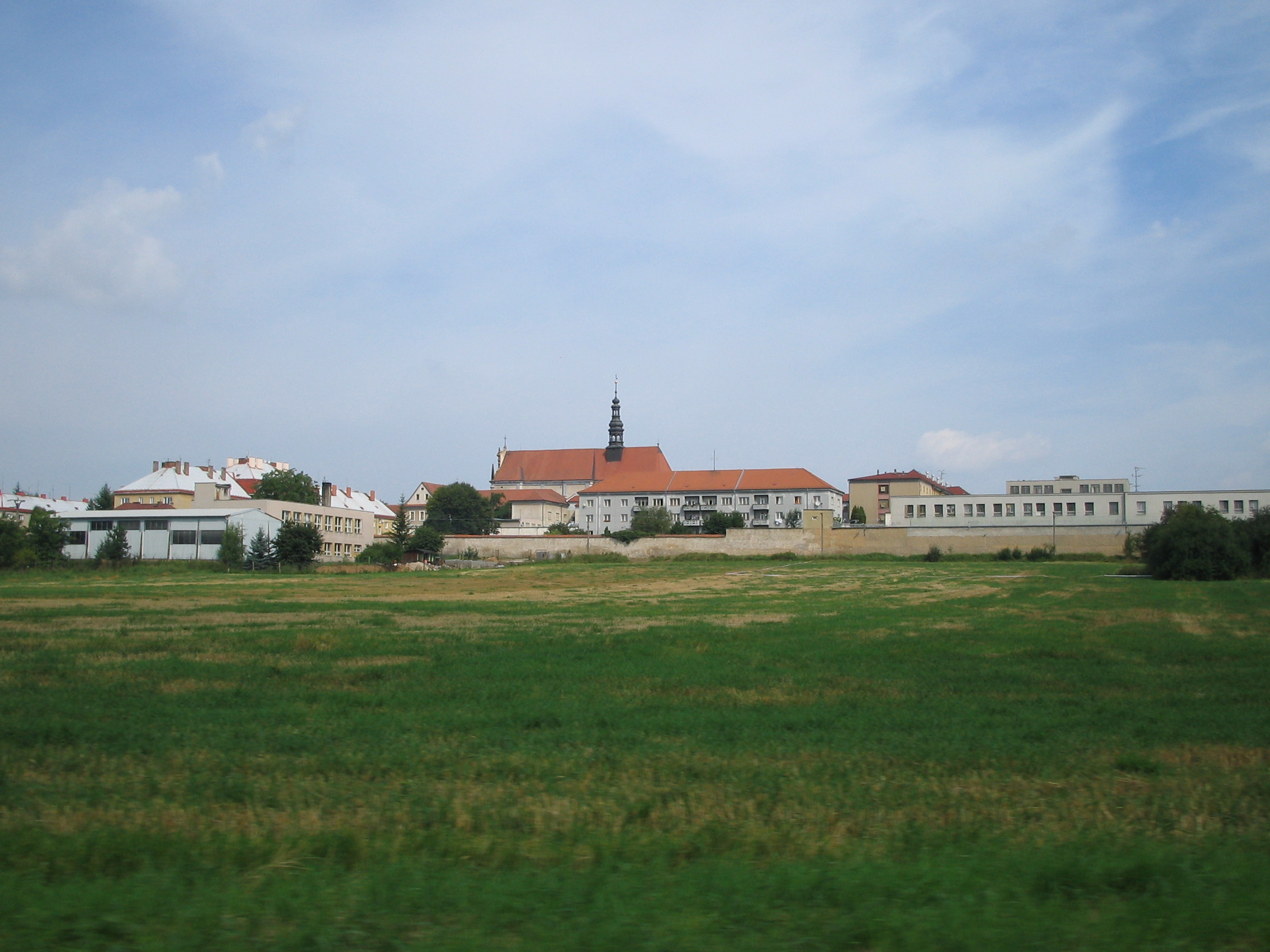
- View from the south

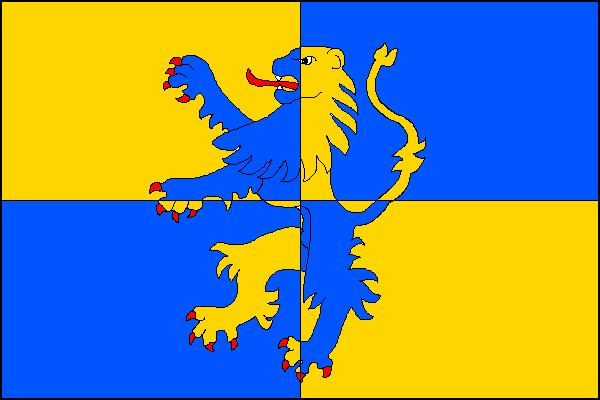
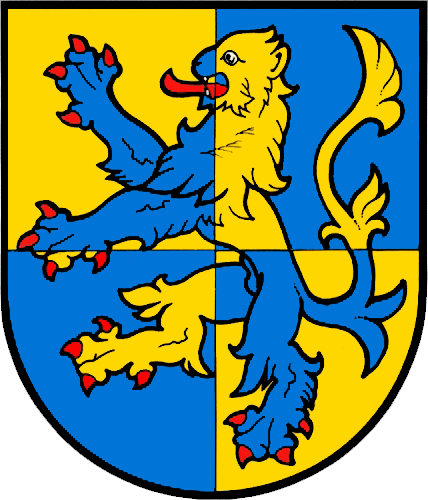
- Flag Coat of arms

- Location in the Czech Republic
- Coordinates: 50°27′18″N 15°23′6″E
- Country: Czech Republic
- Region: Hradec Králové
- District: Jičín
- Founded: 1627

Area
  - Total: 0.92 km^{2} (0.36 sq mi)
- Elevation: 308 m (1,010 ft)

Population (2026-01-01)
  - Total: 1,272
  - Density: 1,400/km^{2} (3,600/sq mi)
- Time zone: UTC+1 (CET)
  - Summer (DST): UTC+2 (CEST)
- Postal code: 507 11
- Website: www.valdice.cz

Valdice (until 1950 Kartouzy-Valdice; German: Karthaus Walditz) is a municipality and village in Jičín District in the Hradec Králové Region of the Czech Republic. It has about 1,300 inhabitants. It is known for a former monastery, which premises are today a high-security prison.

== Etymology ==
Valdice was named after the nearby deer park (from German Wald, meaning 'forest'). It was also called Kartouzy after the local monastery.

== Geography ==
Valdice is located about 2 kilometres (1 mi) northeast of Jičín and 41 km (25 mi) northwest of Hradec Králové. It lies in the Jičín Uplands.

== History ==
The village of Valdice was founded together with a Carthusian monastery by Albrecht von Wallenstein in 1627. About 20 houses were built for craftsmen working for the monks in the monastery. In 1782, the monastery was abolished by Emperor Joseph II. The prison in the premises of the former monastery was established in 1857 by the Austrian Empire.

== Demographics ==
Historical population

Year	Pop.	±%
1869	1,142	—
1880	1,339	+17.3%
1890	1,348	+0.7%
1900	981	−27.2%
1910	1,077	+9.8%

Year	Pop.	±%
1921	1,244	+15.5%
1930	1,018	−18.2%
1950	554	−45.6%
1961	689	+24.4%
1970	780	+13.2%

Year	Pop.	±%
1980	1,346	+72.6%
1991	1,582	+17.5%
2001	1,522	−3.8%
2011	2,412	+58.5%
2021	2,373	−1.6%

Source: Censuses

== Economy ==
The Valdice Prison is the main employer in Valdice. It is classified as a high-security prison with a capacity of 1,023 prisoners. The prison employs more than 400 people.

== Transport ==
The railway line Hradec Králové–Turnov passes through the municipality, but there is no train station. The municipality is served by the Jičín zastávka station in neighbouring Jičín.

== Sights ==
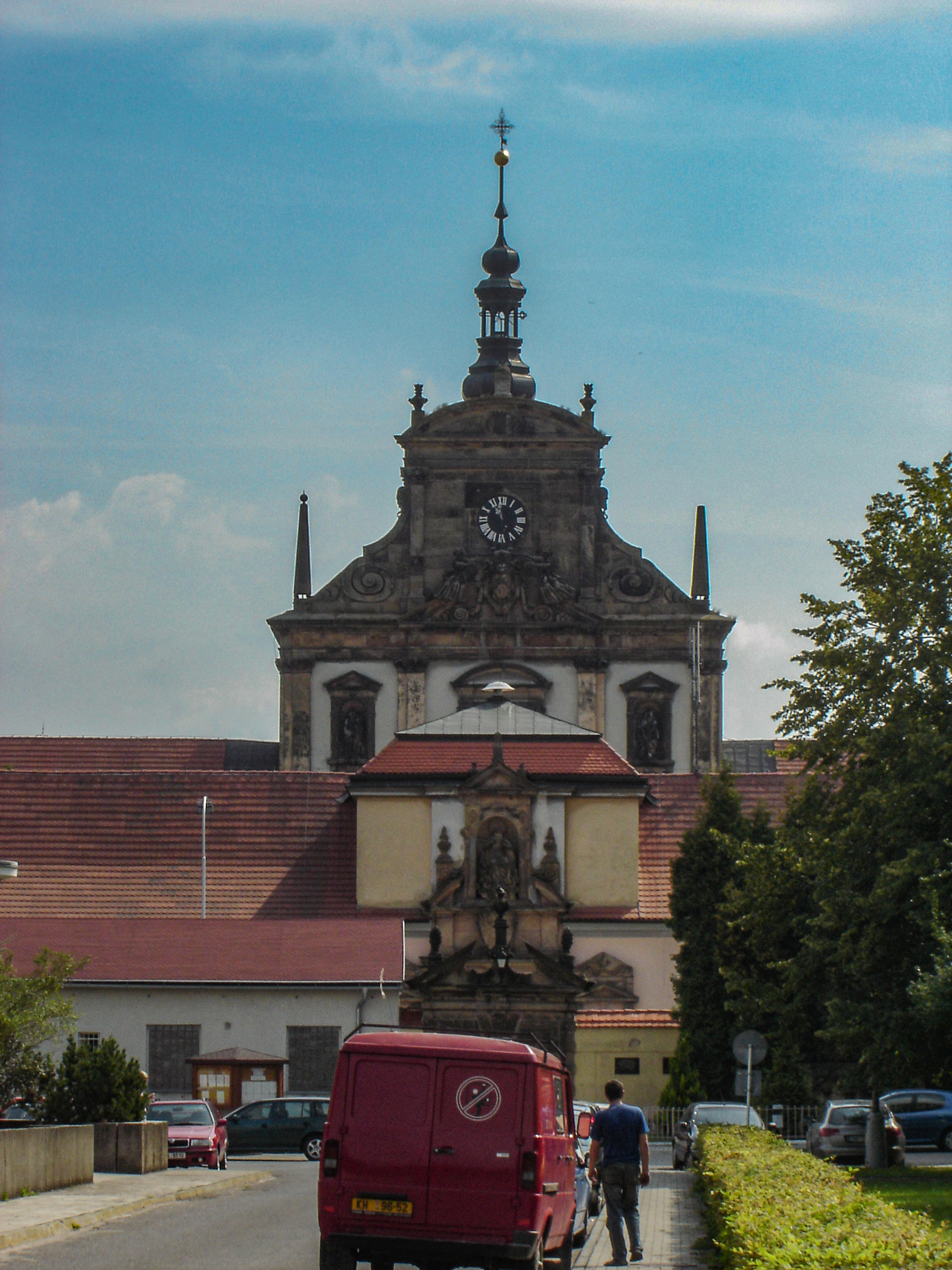
Church of the Assumption of the Virgin Mary

The prison is located in the former Carthusian monastery, which was built in the Baroque style. Its premises are inaccessible. There is also the Church of the Assumption of the Virgin Mary in the monastery complex.

A cultural monument is also the Baroque statue of Saint John of Nepomuk from 1696.

== Notable people ==
- Jiří Stříbrný (1880–1955), politician; died here
