= Neo-Slavism =

Early 20th-century movement promoting Slavic independence, liberalism and co-operation

Contemporary map of the Slavic-speaking nations of Europe. South Slavs are highlighted in dark green, East Slavs in medium green, and West Slavs in light green.

Neo-Slavism was a short-lived movement originating in Austria-Hungary around 1908 and influencing nearby Slavic states in the Balkans as well as Russia. Neo-Slavists promoted cooperation between Slavs on equal terms in order to resist Germanization, pursue modernization and liberal reforms, and wanted to create a democratic community of Slavic nations without the dominating influence of Russia.

It was a branch of a larger and older Pan-Slavism ideology. Unlike Pan-Slavism, Neo-Slavism did not attach importance to religion and did not discriminate between Catholics and Orthodox believers, did not support the creation of a single Slavic state and was interested mostly in a non-violent realization of its program.

== History ==
The movement originated among the Slavs of Austria-Hungary who wished to achieve equal status in that state with the Austrians and Hungarians. It was particularly popular with the Young Czech Party in Austria-Hungary and has been described as "essentially a Czech creation" instigated by the Young Czech leader Karel Kramář. The Neo-Slav movement held two congresses. The founding congress took place in Prague in July 1908, the second was held in Sofia in July 1910. Two other, less formal, gatherings of Neo-Slav activists were held in St Petersburg in May 1909 and February 1910. Despite this activity, the movement made little progress before dissipating in the wake of the Bosnian Crisis and subsequent Balkan Wars and the First World War. It also suffered from the differences between various Slavic groups, with antagonism between Poles and Ukrainians and between different Balkans nations and the lack of support from those nations for either Austria-Hungary and Russia. The movement declared itself apolitical, but it was nonetheless viewed with suspicion by Austro-Hungarian officials.

One of the few effects of the movement was the creation of the Federation of Slavic Sokols (the Sokol movement was highly supportive of Neo-Slavism).

== Characteristics ==
Neo-Slavism aimed to build a barrier against German expansion, reliant on Russia. Germany was seen as a threat due to its Germanization policies and gradual expansion of influence over the Slavic lands. Compared to Pan-Slavism, which was seen as subservient to the Russian interests since it advocated Russian dominance over all other Slavs, Neo-Slavists aimed at a more balanced federation of Slavic states, which was hoped to emerge from a reformed Austria-Hungary. It has also been described as a final evolution of Austro-Slavism. Outside of Austria it aimed at reconciliation between Poles and Russians, with Russian Neo-Slavists declaring their support to recreation of independent Poland and Polish Neo-Slavists accepting that reconciliation was needed to counter the German threat. Russian Neo-Slavists were interested, among others, in fostering equal relations between the nations of the Russian Empire, creating a constitutional-liberal system, and by doing so modernizing Russia; their overall views were non-expansionistic and pursued a balance of power in Europe against increasing German power.

In addition to Karel Kramář, prominent Neo-Slav activists included the Slovene banker and politician Ivan Hribar and, until he distanced himself from the movement in protest against the Russification policies of the authorities in Russian Poland, the Polish politician Roman Dmowski.

While Neo-Slavism was short-lived, it has nonetheless been described as having exerted significant influence on inter-Slavic politics of the period.

== See also ==
- Anti-Germanism
- Pan-Slavism
- Austro-Slavism
- Illyrism
- Czechoslovakism
- Yugoslavism
- Euro-Slavism
- Russophilia
