= Národní sdružení odborových organizací =

Czechoslovak trade union centre

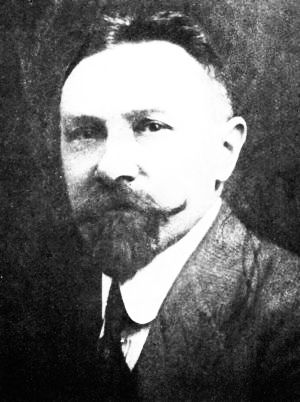
Josef Hudec

Národní sdružení odborových organizací ('National Association of Trade Union Organizations') was a trade union centre in the Czechoslovakia. Politically it was linked to the right-wing Czechoslovak National Democratic Party. The centre was organized by the former socialist Josef Hudec. As of 1929 organization was divided in 7 sections (mining section, textile section, metalworkers section, general trades section, sugar workers section, municipal and state employees section and waiters section) and had 304 branches.

The organization was founded on 10 April 1921. Its ideological precursor Všeodborové sdružení ('All Trade Union Association') was founded on 26 January 1910, changing its name to Česká dělnická jednota ('Czech Workers Unity') in 1912. The name Národní sdružení odborových organizací was adopted in 1921.

It was often labelled as the 'yellow' trade union movement. Whilst smaller than the main trade union centres, it functioned as a gathering point for right-wing workers. It had fascist tendencies and rejected any compromise with the left-wing. Its membership consisted mainly of white-collar employees from Bohemia and Moravia. The organization had its headquarters on 6 Hálkova street, Prague. Antonín Pondělíček was the central chairman of the organization, J. Svoboda its secretary.

By 1925 it claimed to have some 4,000 members. In the 1928 elections to mine workers councils, it was the fourth largest union and won 75 out of 1,308 council seats nationwide. In the Ostrava region it won 50 out of 341 council seats. By 1929, it claimed to have 29,127 members. In August 1929, the Svaz báňských, střelců a dozorců v Moravské Ostravě ('Union of Mining Shooters and Supervisors of Moravian Ostrava'), with 425 members, affiliated itself with the organization but maintained themselves as an autonomous unit. In 1931, the organization won 110 seats in the Ostrava district in the mine workers council elections. As of the early 1930 the mining section had some 10,000 members in the Ostrava district.

With the emergence of the Second Czechoslovak Republic, the organization formed a coalition with the Republikánské ústředí zaměstnanců ('Republican Employees' Centre') and three smaller unions. By November 1938 these organizations merged, to form a new trade union body (Ústředna národní jednoty zaměstnanecké, 'National Centre for Employee Unity') aligned with the Party of National Unity.
