= Jan Černý =

Czech civil servant and politician

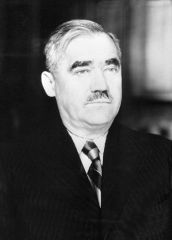

Prime Minister of Czechoslovakia
- In office 1920–1921, 1926

Governor of Moravia
- In office 1918–1920, 1921–1928 and 1929–1939

Personal details
- Born: 4 March 1874 Uherský Ostroh, Moravia, Austria-Hungary
- Died: 10 April 1959 (aged 85) Uherský Ostroh, Czechoslovakia

Jan Černý (4 March 1874 – 10 April 1959) was a Czech civil servant and politician. He was the prime minister of Czechoslovakia from 1920 to 1921 and in 1926. He also served as the provincial president (governor) of Moravia in 1918–1920, 1921–1928 and 1929–1939.

== Life and career ==
Jan Černý was bornon 4 March 1874 into a furriers family in the small town of Uherský Ostroh, in the east of (Moravia. He attended the gymnasium (a grammar school) in Uherské Hradiště from 1885 to 1893. After studies at the Faculty of Law of Charles University in Prague – he graduated in 1898 – he began professional career as a state servant (county director) in Hodonín. From 1912 he was a senior department director in the Moravian governor's office (stadtholder government). At the time of the revolutionary establishment of Czechoslovakia, being the highest-ranked Czech-speaking imperial state servant in Moravia, he became the head of the local government for the new state on 29 November 1918.

Preceded by Vlastimil Tusar	Prime Minister of Czechoslovakia; 1920–1921	Succeeded by Edvard Beneš
Preceded by Antonín Švehla	Prime Minister of Czechoslovakia; 1926	Succeeded by Antonín Švehla
