= František Udržal =

Czechoslovak politician (1866–1938)

František Udržal

František Udržal (Czech pronunciation: [ˈfraɲcɪʃɛk ˈudr̩ʒal]) (3 January 1866 in Dolní Roveň, Kingdom of Bohemia – 25 April 1938 in Prague) was a Czechoslovak politician.

A member and leader of the powerful Agrarian Party, his political career started as a member of the local Diet of Bohemia, then of parliament of Austria-Hungary, then of parliament of Czechoslovakia. He served seven years as the minister of defense and four years as prime minister of Czechoslovakia (1 February 1929 – 24 October 1932) in two periods (1 February 1929 – 7 December 1929 and 7 December 1929 – 24 October 1932).

== See also ==
- History of Czechoslovakia
- List of prime ministers of Czechoslovakia

Government offices
| Preceded by Otakar Husák | Minister of Defence of Czechoslovakia; 1921–1925 | Succeeded by Jiří Stříbrný |
| Preceded by Jan Syrový | Minister of Defence of Czechoslovakia; 1926–1929 | Succeeded by Karel Viškovský |
| Preceded by Antonín Švehla | Prime Minister of Czechoslovakia; 1929–1932 | Succeeded by Jan Malypetr |
