= Maffia =

Secret World War I organization

- Maffie
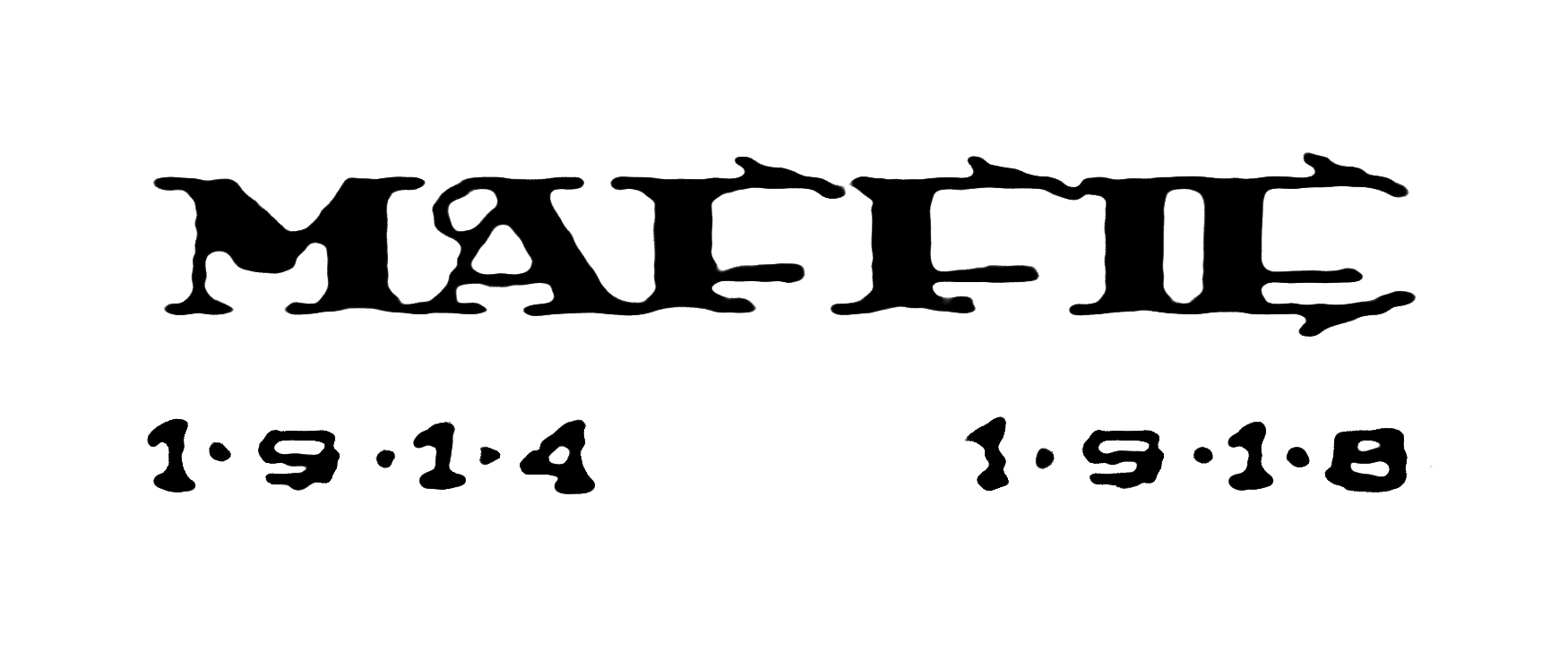
- Logo of Maffia
- Leaders: Tomáš Garrigue Masaryk; Edvard Beneš; Karel Kramář; Milan Rastislav Štefánik
- Dates active: 1914–1918
- Headquarters: Paris
- Active regions: Bohemia; Moravia; Silesia; Hungary; Poland
- Ideology: independence, espionage, subversion, separatism
- Size: over 200 members
- Wars: World War I

Maffia (Maffie or Mafie in Czech) was a secret organization acting during World War I. It was founded after the emigration of Tomáš Garrigue Masaryk in 1914 by Czech politician Edvard Beneš, who later became the second president of Czechoslovakia, and other mainly anti-royalists (Karel Kramář, Alois Rašín, Josef Scheiner and Přemysl Šámal).

Maffia was based on the principles of the Sicilian Mafia (name "Maffia"); it was a central part of the First Czechoslovak Resistance and its main objective was to overthrow the Emperor of Austria and to cause the disintegration of his country. The Maffia plot against Austria-Hungary and the Central Powers was uncovered by the police in 1915; some members of Maffia (Karel Kramář, Alois Rašín, Vincent Červinka and Josef Zamazal) were arrested and sentenced to death (they were later amnestied by Emperor Charles I.); Edvard Beneš escaped from Austria-Hungary to Switzerland on 3 September 1915, but the subversive activities of Maffia continued, under the leadership of Přemysl Šámal, until the end of the First World War. Maffia had over 200 members and was supported from abroad (US, Italy etc.).
