= Lysanne Tusar =

Lysanne Tusar is the founding Director and CMO of Hong Kong's only winery, The 8th Estate Winery.

== Background ==
Tusar was born in Vancouver, British Columbia, Canada. She attended University of British Columbia and completed her BA in 2004. During school and after graduating, she spent time working across Canada and the United States for marketing, PR and advertising firms and in-house companies that specialized in a wide selection of beverages.

== Career ==
In 2007, Tusar opened the 8th Estate Winery in Ap Lei Chau, Hong Kong and the first vintage of wine released was in 2008. Tusar's wine has won awards including the 2011 Cathay Pacific International Wine & Spirit Competition and the Shanghai International Wine Challenge 2012.
