= Jiří Stříbrný =

Czech politician

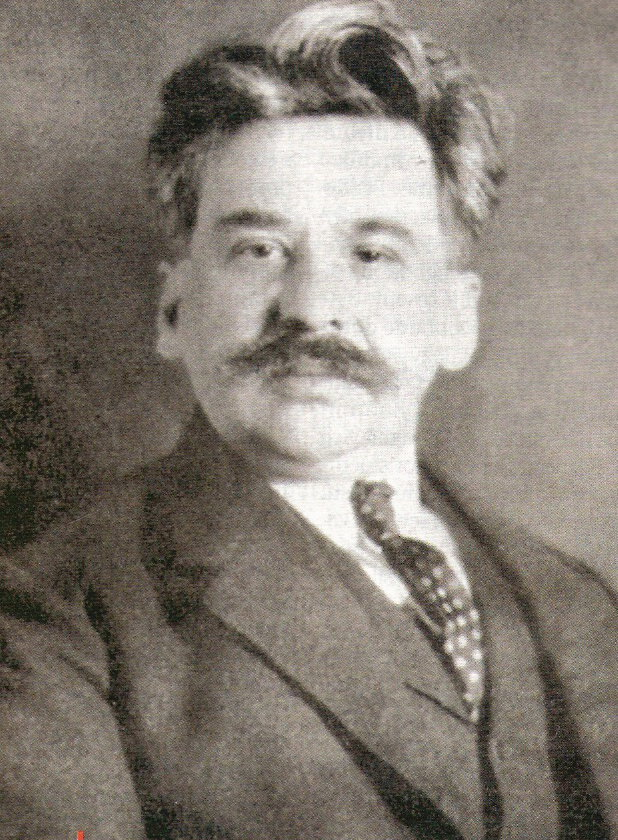

Minister of Post and Telegraphs
- In office 1918–1919

Minister of Railroads
- In office 1919 – 1920, 1922–1925

Minister of Defense
- In office 1925–1926

Personal details
- Born: 14 January 1880 Rokycany, Kingdom of Bohemia
- Died: 21 January 1955 (aged 75) Valdice
- Party: Czech National Social Party, National league, Party of National Unity
- Occupation: politician, businessman

Jiří Stříbrný (14 January 1880 – 21 January 1955) was a Czech politician. He was one of the "founding fathers" of the Czechoslovak Republic, but became a quite controversial figure later on. He died in prison in 1955, after being charged with World War II collaboration, although the specifics remain unclear.

In 1926, Stříbrný was expelled from the Czechoslovak Socialist Party, just a short time after General Radola Gajda was forced to stand down from the military. Gajda openly admitted to being a supporter of Italian fascism, although some would say he was fired on command of Tomáš Masaryk and Edvard Beneš. Gajda expressed his grievances through the press holdings of Stříbrný, which did not sit well with the Socialist Party leadership, under Beneš (although Stříbrný was not particularly fond of Beneš himself).

Stříbrný founded a fascist party, the Slavic Socialist Party (Stranu slovanských socialistů), later known as the National league (Národní ligu), through which he participated in local elections. He cooperated with Gajda and Charles Pergler in the 1929 elections (Liga proti vázaným kandidátním listinám), getting elected to the Chamber of Deputies again. In the 1930s, he worked with Karel Kramář in the National Union (Národní sjednocení), which also included the likes of František Mareš. At the end of the Second World War, Stříbrný was arrested and charged with collaboration. He died in Valdice prison in 1955.

Government offices
Preceded by František Udržal	Minister of Defence of Czechoslovakia; 1925–1926	Succeeded by Jan Syrový
