= Národní listy =

Czech newspaper

- Type: Daily newspaper
- Founder: Julius Grégr
- Founded: January 1861
- Ceased publication: 1941
- Language: Czech
- Headquarters: Prague

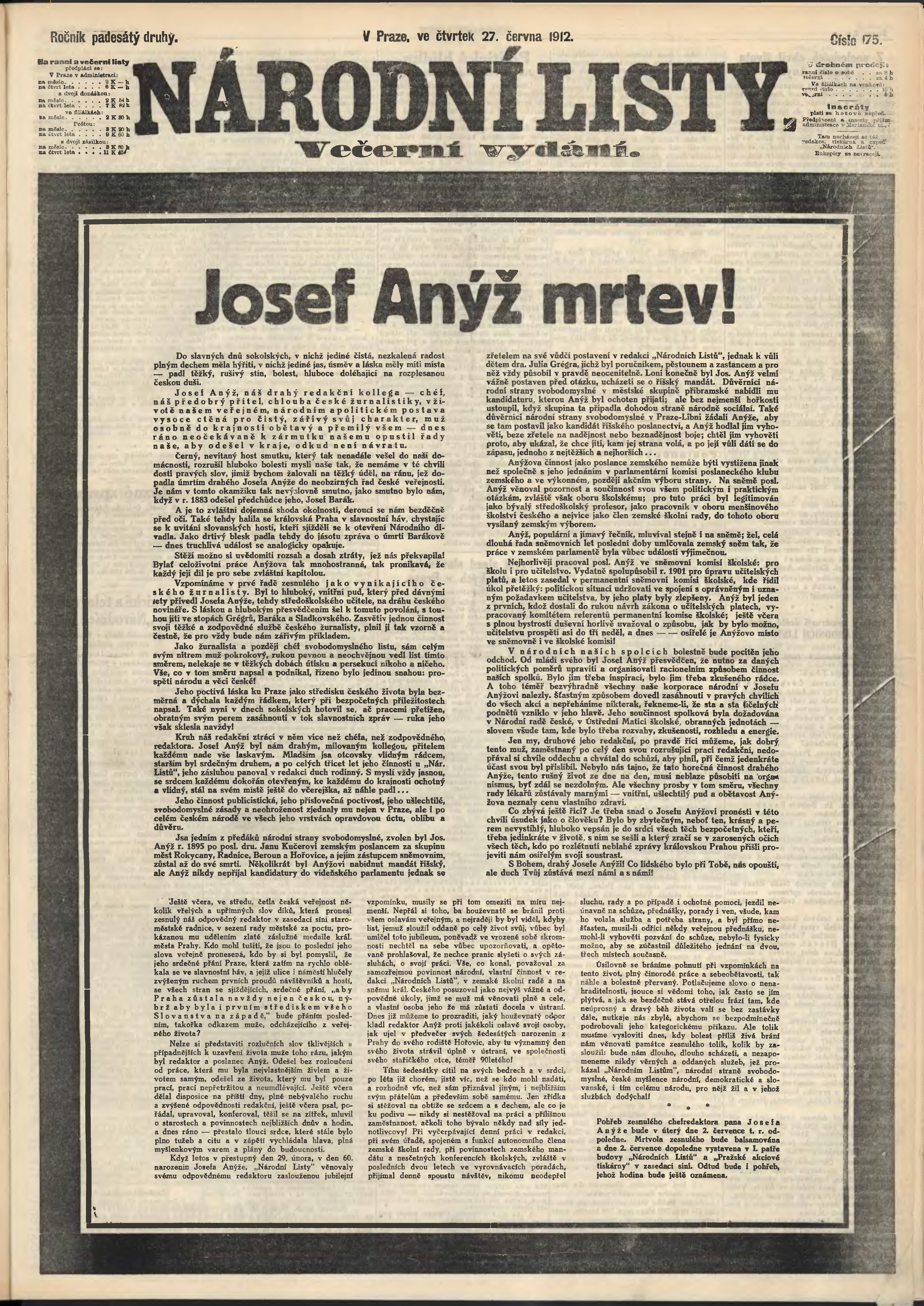
Národní listy

Národní listy ("The National Newspaper") was a Czech newspaper published in Prague from 1861 to 1941.

== History ==
The decision to start Národni listy began in September 1860. The first issue of the newspaper was first published in January 1861 in an edition of 7,000 copies.

From 1861 to 1894 it was published by Julius Grégr; since 1874 it was the main newspaper of the Young Czech Party. The Grégr family owned and published the newspaper up until 1910; when it was transferred to the printing house Pražská akciová tiskárna founded by two other members of the Young Czech Party, Karel Kramář and Alois Rašín.

In October 1917, brothers Josef Čapek and Karel Čapek joined the staff as writers, but they left in April 1921 when the paper shifted toward increasingly narrow nationalistic orientations. The paper was briefly suspended a few months before Czechoslovak Independence Day (28 October 1918).

From 1918 to 1938 it was the main newspaper of National Democratic Party (Czechoslovakia) and the National Unification, both led by Karel Kramář. After the Nazi occupation of Czechoslovakia, it operated as the newspaper of National Partnership, the only political party that was allowed. In April 1941 it ceased its publishing.

== Prominent editors ==
Jan Neruda, Vítězslav Hálek, Karel Sladkovský, Karel Čapek, Karel Matěj Čapek-Chod, Josef Čapek, Viktor Dyk, Jakub Arbes.
