= Vlastimil Tusar =

Czech journalist and political figure

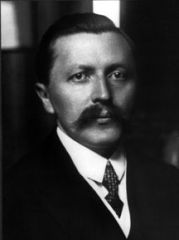

Prime Minister of Czechoslovakia
- In office 8 July 1919 – 15 September 1920
- Preceded by: Karel Kramář
- Succeeded by: Jan Černý

Member of the Austrian Imperial Council
- In office 1911–1918

Member of the Czechoslovak National Assembly
- In office 27 October 1918 – 1 March 1921

Personal details
- Born: 18 October 1880 Prague, Austria-Hungary
- Died: 22 March 1924 (aged 43) Berlin, Weimar Republic
- Party: Social Democratic Party
- Occupation: Journalist

Vlastimil Tusar (18 October 1880 – 22 March 1924) was a Czech journalist and political figure. He served as prime minister of Czechoslovakia from 1919 to 1920, in two periods.

Tusar was born as the son of a civil servant, and attended a grammar school and an economical school in Prague. Between 1900 and 1903 he worked for a bank, in 1903 he became a journalist for various social democratic papers. In 1908 he became editor in chief of the weekly magazine "Rovnost" in Brno and changed it into a daily newspaper.

In 1911, he was elected Member of the Austrian Reichsrat (the parliament of Austro-Hungary) for the constituency of Brno. At first he was pro-Austrian oriented, but later he changed his mind and in 1918 he played a vital role in the formation of Czechoslovakia as a new state. On 27 October 1918 from Vienna he informed Alois Rašín, that it was the best moment to declare the independence of Czechoslovakia. Then he became a member of the new Czechoslovak parliament, but until 1919 he stayed in Vienna as a negotiator with the newly formed Republic of Austria, negotiating mainly about border issues.

8 July 1919 he became prime minister of a new coalition government of Social Democrats and the Agrarian party. After parliamentary elections in 1920 he became prime minister again. On 14 August the government resigned because of the rising activity of the communist wing in Social Democracy.

On 1 March 1921 he left his seat in parliament, having been made Czechoslovak ambassador in Berlin, where he died in 1924.

== Private life ==
Vlastimil Tusar married Štěpánka Tusarová (née Pelíšková) in 1906, with whom he had two daughters, and divorced her in 1912. From 1917 until his death in 1924 he was married to Hedvika Tusarová (née Welzel).

Preceded by Karel Kramář	Prime Minister of Czechoslovakia; 1919–1920	Succeeded by Jan Černý
