= Party of National Unity (Czechoslovakia) =

Party of National Unity Strana národní jednoty
- Abbreviation: SNJ
- Leader: Rudolf Beran
- Founded: 17 November 1938
- Dissolved: 16 March 1939
- Merger of: RSZML, NSj, ČŽOS, NOF and others
- Merged into: National Partnership
- Headquarters: Prague, Czechoslovakia
- Newspaper: Národní listy
- Youth wing: Young National Unity
- Ideology: Nationalism; Authoritarian conservatism Corporate statism
- Political position: Right-wing to far-right
- Colors: Blue

The Party of National Unity (Czech: Strana národní jednoty or Strana národního sjednocení) was a party created on 21 November 1938 in the Czech part of Czechoslovakia after the occupation of large parts of the country by Germany (Munich Agreement) and Hungary (First Vienna Award) as a last attempt to unify forces to save Czechoslovakia from disappearing. Its Slovak equivalent in the Slovak part of Czechoslovakia was the Hlinka's Slovak Peoples Party - Party of Slovak National Unity created on 8 November.

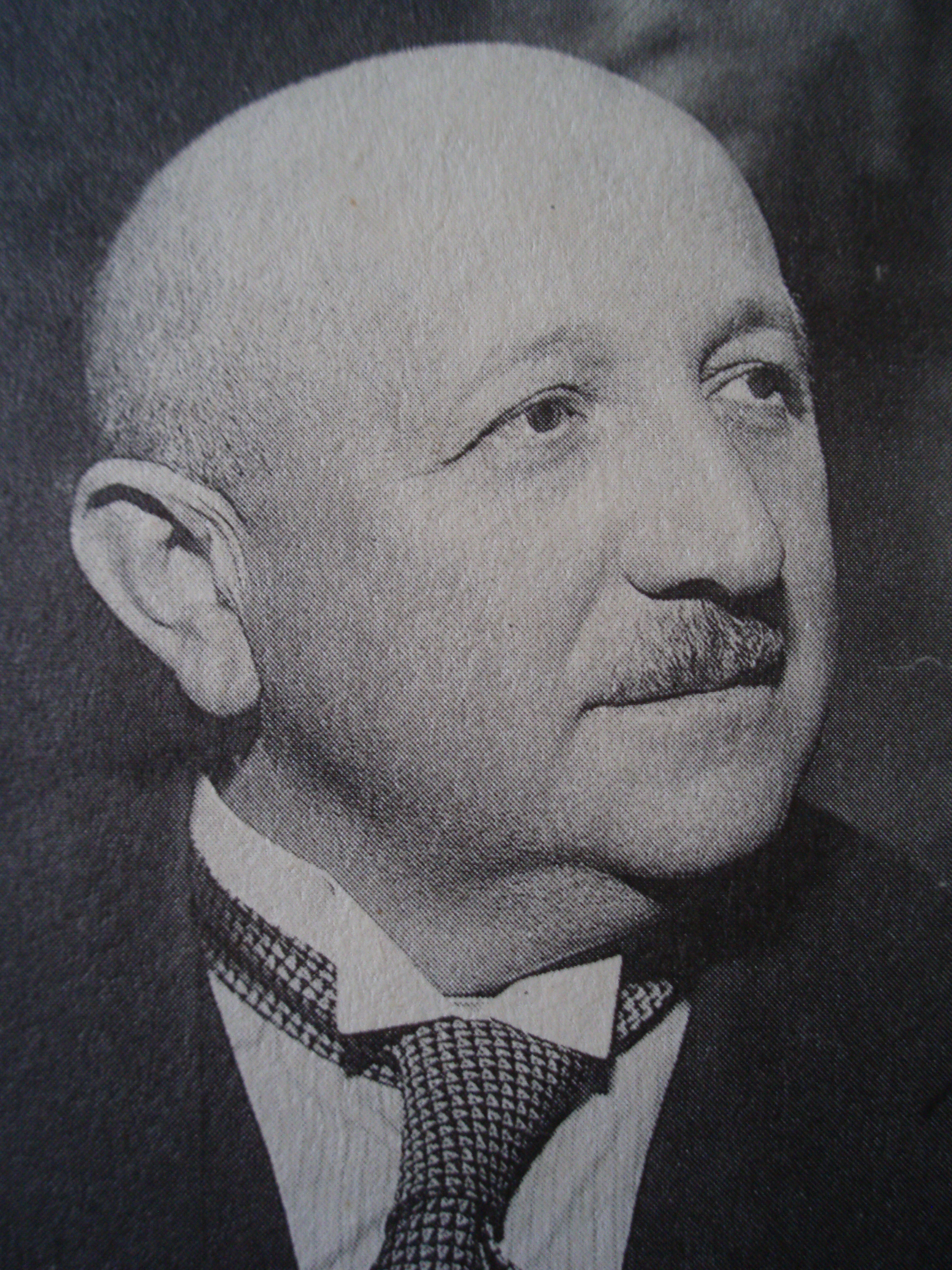
Rudolf Beran

It included most then-existing Czech political parties - including the Republican Party of Farmers and Peasants, Czechoslovak People's Party, National Unification, Czechoslovak Traders' Party, and National Fascist Community, with minor parties like the National League, Czechoslovak Christian Social Party, National People's Party and part of the Czechoslovak National Social Party.

The only parties outside the Party of National Unity were the Communist Party, the Social Democratic Party, and the other part of the National Social Party. The latter two founded the National Labor Party in December 1938 as a non-Communist left "loyal opposition".

Ideologically the Party of National Unity was corporatist and quasi-fascist. Its chairman was the nation's Prime Minister, Rudolf Beran.

The party was forcibly dissolved after the creation of the Protectorate of Bohemia and Moravia in March 1939. Some of the membership created the Národní souručenství (National Partnership), the only Czech political organization permitted by the Germans in the Protectorate.

== See also ==
- History of Czechoslovakia
- Slovak People's Party
