= Antonín Švehla =

Czechoslovak politician (1873–1933)

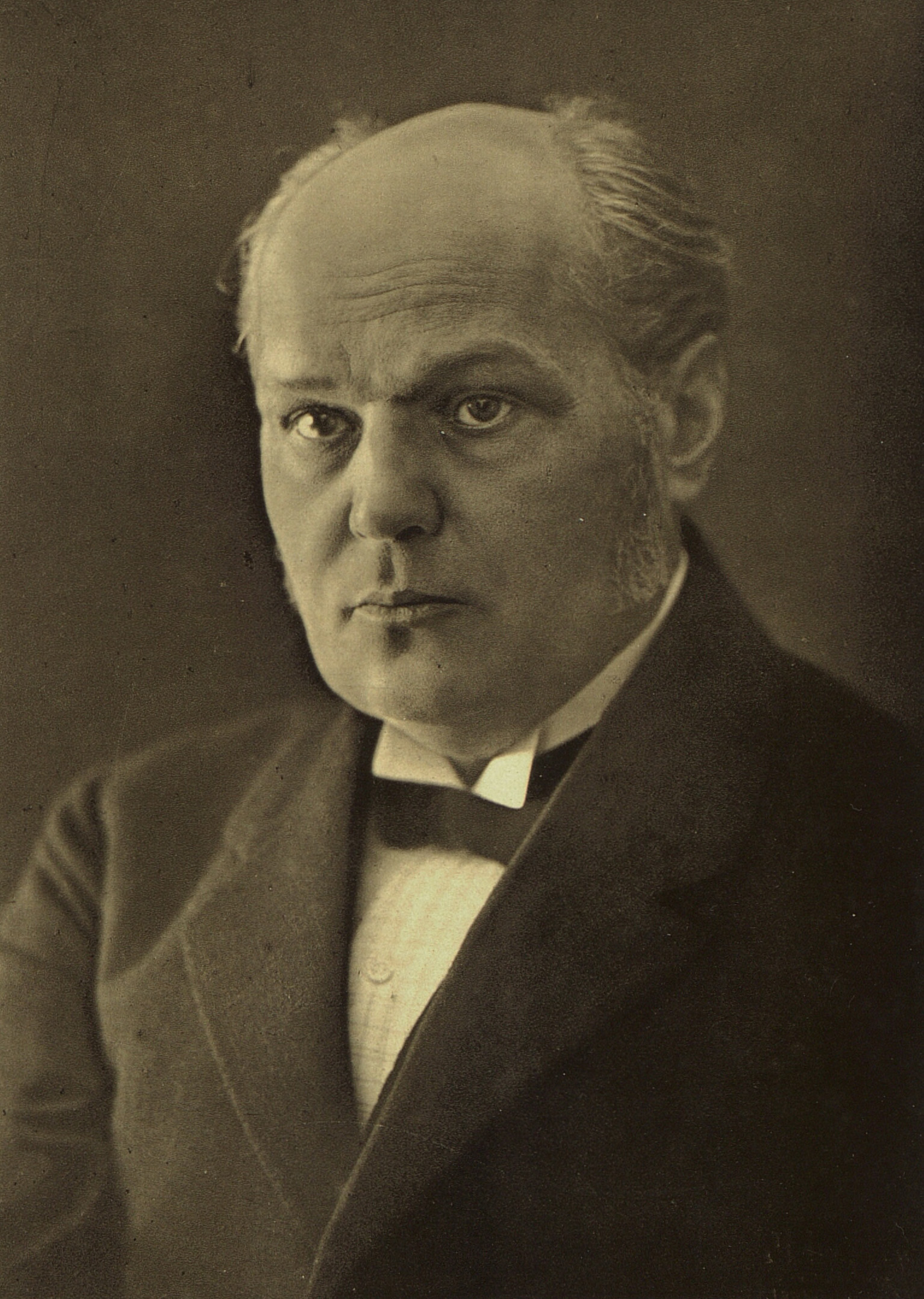
Antonín Švehla

Antonín Švehla (15 April 1873, in Hostivař – 12 December 1933 in Prague) was a Czechoslovak politician. He served three terms as the Interior Minister and three terms as the prime minister of Czechoslovakia. He is regarded as one of the most important political figures of the First Czechoslovak Republic; he was the leader of the Agrarian Party, which was dominant within the Pětka, which was largely his own invention. Švehla is also credited with the slogan of the Pětka: "We have agreed that we will agree."

He supported professor T. G. Masaryk in his fight for Czechoslovak independence. He was member of Sokol gymnastics organization and member of Czechoslovak Masonic Lodge.

Švehla was dedicated to the cause of Czech nationalism, going so far as to refuse to run for the Vienna Reichsrat in 1911 because, as he stated: "In Vienna the Czechs are nobody, while in Prague they could be everything". Before his death he was very worried about the growing rise of the German Nazi Party and how Czech democracy might be altered to meet this danger.

The garden of the European Campus of Sciences Po Paris in Dijon, France is named "Garden of the Agrarians of Antonín Švehla (1873–1933)" in memory of Antonín Švehla. There is a monument to Antonín Švehla in Hradec Králové.

== See also ==
- First Republic of Czechoslovakia

| Preceded by Edvard Beneš | Prime Minister of Czechoslovakia; 1922–1926 | Succeeded by Jan Černý |
| Preceded by Jan Černý | Prime Minister of Czechoslovakia; 1926–1929 | Succeeded by František Udržal |
