= Karel Kramář =

Czech politician (1860–1937)

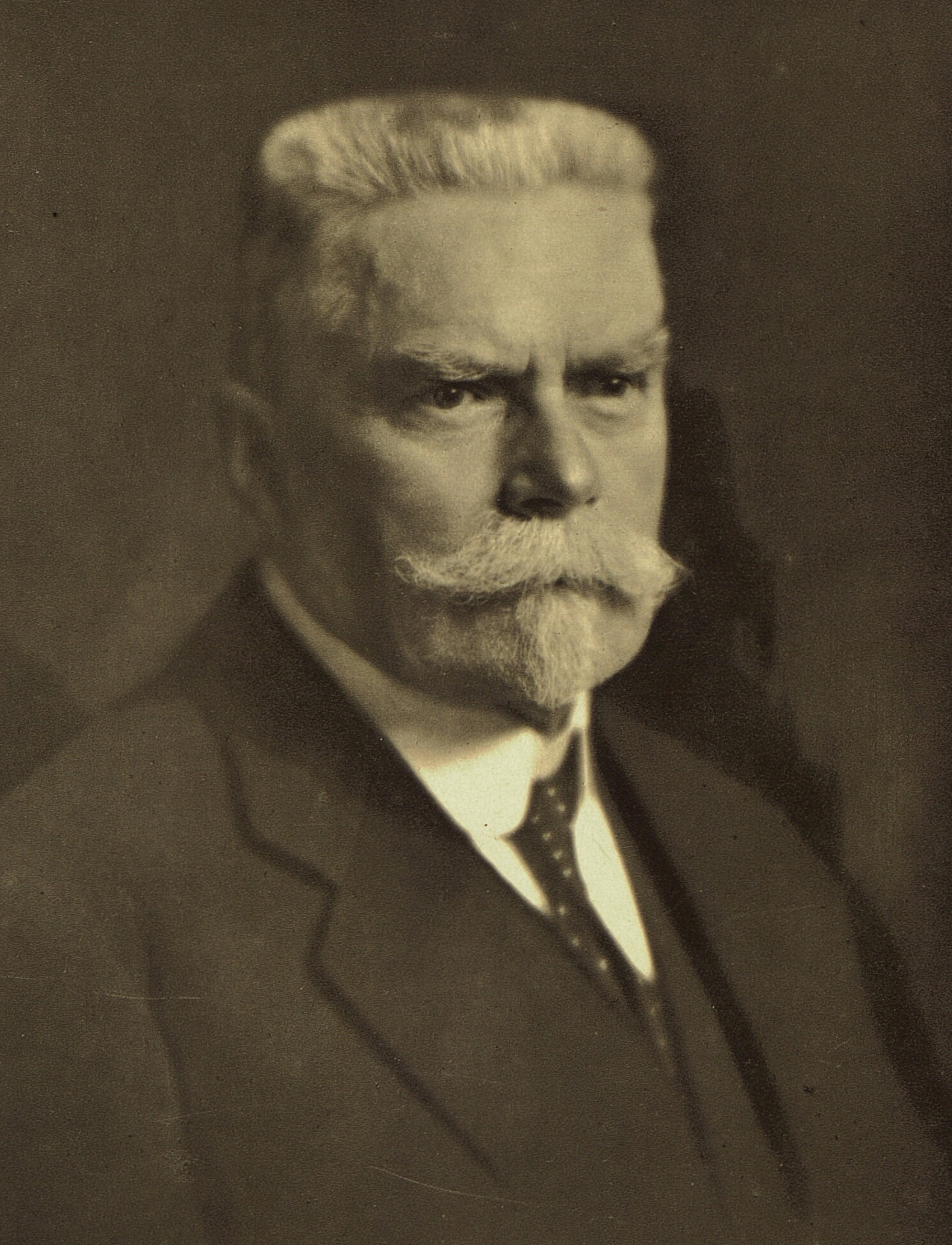

Prime Minister of Czechoslovakia
- In office 14 November 1918 – 8 July 1919
- Preceded by: Position established
- Succeeded by: Vlastimil Tusar

Personal details
- Born: 27 December 1860 Vysoké nad Jizerou, Austrian Empire
- Died: 26 May 1937 (aged 76) Prague, Czechoslovakia
- Party: Old Czech Party; Young Czech Party; National Democracy; National Unification
- Occupation: Politician

Karel Kramář (27 December 1860 – 26 May 1937) was a Czech politician. He was a representative of the major Czech political party, the Young Czechs, in the Austrian Imperial Council from 1891 to 1915 (where he was also known as Karl Kramarsch), becoming the party leader in 1897.

During the First World War, Kramář was imprisoned for treason against Austria-Hungary but later released under an amnesty. In 1918, he headed the Czechoslovak National Committee in Prague, which declared independence on 28 October. Kramář became the first Prime Minister of the new state but resigned over policy differences less than a year later. Although he remained a member of the National Assembly until his death in 1937, his conservative nationalism was out of tune with the main political establishment, represented by the figures of Tomáš Garrigue Masaryk and Edvard Beneš.

== Early life ==
Kramář was born in Vysoké nad Jizerou (Hochstadt an der Iser), near the northern border of what is now the Czech Republic, into a wealthy family. He was the only one of five children to survive to school age.

Kramář was educated at the universities of Prague, Strasbourg and Berlin, and also at the École libre des sciences politiques in Paris, completing his studies with a doctorate in law. In the 1880s, Kramář played a prominent role in the agitation against the fact that Charles-Ferdinand University in Prague offered instructions almost exclusively in German; demands were made for a Czech language university so that Czech students could be educated in their own language. The issue of whether the language of instruction at Charles-Ferdinand University would be German or Czech was an extremely controversial one in the early 1880s, leading to frequent fights on the streets of Prague between ethnic German and ethnic Czech students. Finally in 1882, the Emperor Franz-Josef approved breaking Charles-Ferdinand University into two independent branches, with one that offered instruction in Czech and another instruction in German.

== Early career ==
Kramář became the leader of the Young Czech Party in Austria-Hungary and later of the National Democratic Party in Czechoslovakia. In 1896, Kramář become the Austrian Minister of Finance. Like other Slavic politicians in the Dual Monarchy, Kramář disliked the Compromise of 1867, which he felt had elevated the Magyars to a position of political power that their numbers did not warrant. Kramář believed that time and democracy in the form of universal suffrage would transform the Austrian Empire into a Slavic state, as the Slavic peoples were the most numerous of the various ethnic groups in the empire.

Further, Kramář wanted the Austrian Empire to abandon its alliance with Germany in favor of an alliance with Russia. Like many other Young Czechs, Kramář was a Russophile, seeing Russia as the world's only Slavic great power that counterbalanced the dominant ethnic Germans of the Habsburg monarchy. Kramář's wife was a Russian socialite, the daughter of a Moscow industrialist and until 1917 they owned a lavish villa in the Crimea. Kramář was fascinated with Russian culture and loved Russian literature. Tomáš Masaryk often criticized Kramář for the contradiction between his push for universal suffrage and democracy in the Austrian Empire and his support of closer ties with the autocracy of Imperial Russia. The October Manifesto of 1905 was hailed by Kramář as a sign that Russia was liberalizing and would soon become a democratic power in the near-future.

His aim of transforming Austria, coupled with his belief that Russia had turned towards democracy, led Kramář to launch a movement for Slav unity. In 1908, he founded Neo-Slavism, based on the principle of equality among the Slav nations in contrast with the Russian-dominated Pan-Slavism of the past. Despite staging two congresses – in Prague in 1908 and Sofia in 1910 – and attempts to found a Slav bank and to stage a Slav industrial exhibition, the initiative failed to achieve Slav unity and reorientate the Habsburg Empire towards Russia. Disagreements amongst the Slav nations proved insurmountable and Neo-Slavism faded away in the atmosphere of increasing international tension prior to the outbreak of the First World War.

Kramář pushed the government to provide greater legal expression of the Czech language, for instance allowing court cases in Bohemia to be conducted in Czech rather than German and for bilingual signs in both German and Czech at Army bases in the "Czech lands" of Bohemia, Moravia and Silesia. Kramář had little love for the House of Habsburg, but he was willing to accept that the Czechs remain part of the Austrian Empire, provided that the empire was reorganized to give greater autonomy to the "Czech lands".

A liberal nationalist with close ties to the political elite in Prague and Vienna, Kramář pursued a policy of cooperation with the Austrian state as the best means of achieving Czech national goals before the First World War, even as he favored closer ties between the Czechs and the Russian Empire. His commitment to this policy of cooperation with the Austrian government ("positive politics" in the parlance of the day) led him to resign his leadership of the Young Czech party in 1914 as the party drifted toward a more nationalist and oppositional stance. By 1914, Kramář was already drifting out of the political mainstream.

== World War I ==
When the First World War began in 1914, Kramář resolved to work against the Habsburg monarchy, as he concluded that a victory for Germany and Austria would mark the end of the possibility of reform in the Austrian Empire. The way in which Austria-Hungary increasingly started to function as a satellite state of Germany led to increasing Czech support for independence during the war as it became clear that if the Central powers won, Slavic peoples of the Austrian Empire would likely never become the equals of the ethnic Germans and the Magyars.

In the fall of 1914, Kramář advised the other Czech politicians to wait as "the Russians will do it for us alone". Kramář was referring to the Russian victories in Galicia in September 1914 that saw about 50% of the entire Austrian Army killed, wounded or captured, a crippling blow that ended whatever possibility that might had existed for Austria to be an equal partner with Germany and reduced the Austrians down to very much junior partners of the Germans. In March 1915, Kramář was together with Přemysl Šámal, Alois Rašín, Josef Scheiner and Edvard Beneš a founding member of an underground group called the Maffie which was dedicated to winning Czech independence from the Austrian empire. The Maffie was in contact with Russian military intelligence and used secret codes to pass on messages to Petrograd. On 3 April 1915, Kramář learned that the entire 28th Infantry Regiment of the Imperial Austrian and Royal Hungarian Army, which had been recruited from the working class districts of Prague, had surrendered en masse to the Russians in Galicia. Kramář sent a message to the Russians asking that Czech independence be declared to be one of the war aims of the Allies.

On 3 May 1915, Kramář told the Agrarian deputy in the Reichsrat Josef Dürich who was about to go abroad to seek Allied support for independence that he should seek a "great Slav empire" under the House of Romanov in which Bohemia would be an autonomous kingdom ruled by some Romanov grand duke. During the First World War the Austrian authorities charged Kramář with treason, tried him and ultimately sentenced him to 15 years of hard labour. Kramář was arrested and charged with high treason on 21 May 1915. His imprisonment acted however to galvanise Czech nationalist opinion against the Austrian state. Kramář's imprisonment sidelined him for much of World War I, and allowed his rival Masaryk who was in London at the time to become the public face of the Czech independence movement. On 3 June 1916, Kramář was convicted of treason and sentenced to death. In March 1917, when waiting on death row in prison, Kramář heard of the February Revolution in Russia, which marked the end of his dream that after the war a Romanov would sit on the throne of a restored Bohemian kingdom. Kramář's cellmate Alois Rašín remarked "We are finished!". The new Austrian Emperor Karl I released Kramář as part of a general political amnesty in 1917.

On 13 July 1918 Kramář founded the Czechoslovak National Committee in Prague, in which all the Czech political parties were represented to work for independence from Austria. On 28 October 1918, Kramář had the National Committee issue a declaration in Prague announcing "The independent Czechoslovak state has come into being" and the long centuries of rule by the House of Habsburg over the Czechs had now ended. For the first two days a standoff ensured as the Austrian authorities proclaimed martial law and ordered the arrest of National Committee leaders, but the unwillingness of the troops of the Prague garrison, consisting mostly of ethnic Hungarians and Romanians from Transylvania, to obey orders ensured the Czechs triumphed peacefully. The soldiers had little desire to fight for the collapsing Austrian empire and many of the troops from Transylvania allowed themselves to be draped in the new Czechoslovak flag as they fraternized with the people of Prague.

== Independence ==
On 31 October, Kramář, who had gone to Geneva to meet with Beneš, representing the Paris-based National Council, concluded that a new Czechoslovak state would be a parliamentary republic with Masaryk as president, Kramář as premier and Beneš as foreign minister. Kramář was impressed with Beneš's skills as a diplomat, reporting to Prague: "If you saw our Dr. Beneš and his mastery of global questions...you would take off your hat and say it was truly marvelous!"

Formerly close associates, Masaryk and Kramář had been barely on speaking terms by 1914. Kramář, as the most prominent politician in Czechoslovakia, was named the country's first prime minister (14 November 1918 – 8 July 1919), much to the displeasure of Masaryk. When Masaryk was named president, he was in the United States lobbying for American support for Czechoslovakia, so Kramář, as the premier in Prague, largely ran Czechoslovakia in its first months.

In January 1919, the Polish–Czechoslovak War between Poland and Czechoslovakia began over the Duchy of Teschen. The Teschen region, which had a Polish majority and a Czech minority, was very rich in coal. However, the main reason that Kramář gave the Poles an ultimatum, demanding their withdrawal from Teschen, was to strengthen the Czechoslovak claim on the Sudetenland. To allow Teschen to join Poland because it had a Polish majority would create a precedent for the German-speaking Sudetenland to join Germany. Like other Czech politicians, Kramář insisted on the indivisibility of the former Austrian Crown lands of Bohemia, Moravia and Silesia, arguing that everything that was once part of the Austrian Empire's "Czech lands" was now part of Czechoslovakia, and maintaining the claim on the Sudetenland that led Kramář to insist so forcefully that Teschen was part of Czechoslovakia.

In first months of Czechoslovakia, wages in the cities fell by 60% in real terms owing to inflation and 350,000 workers, making up 8% of the population were unemployed. Inflation was a major problem in the first months of the new republic, all the more so as Czechoslovakia continued to use the old Habsburg notes, in common with other former nations of the Habsburg Empire, which printed their notes in abandon, in a sense "exporting" their inflation. In February 1919, a degree ordered that only Habsburg notes stamped with the Czechoslovak lion were legal tender, and in April 1919, the Czechoslovak crown was introduced as the new currency. The February degree largely ended the inflation that was threatening the economical destabilisation of Czechoslovakia.

Within the new state, about 150 families owned a tenth of all the land, but half of Czech farmers owned only a half a hectare, and two-thirds of Slovak peasant families were landless. In April 1919, Kramář issued a land reform act that limited the amount of land any farmer could own to 150 hectares, thus breaking up all large estates, owned mostly by the German-speaking and Hungarian-speaking nobility. The land was redistributed to smallholders and landless farm labourers. Even Kramář's opponent Masaryk called the land reform act "the greatest act of the new republic", as it stabilised the countryside, creating a class of small farmers who owned the land they worked and contributed to the subsequent political stability of Czechoslovakia in the 1920s. In an attack on the power of the aristocracy, which Kramář viewed as "foreign" because they usually spoke German or Hungarian, all titles of nobility were abolished in the new republic. In an attempt to ward off the appeal of the left, another degree established 8 hours as the maximum that could be worked on a single day, thus giving to one of the key demands of the trade union movement. In May 1919, an anarchist, Alois Šťastný, made an unsuccessful attempt to kill Kramář.

Once independence had been won, Kramář's National Democrat Party, whose supporters were mostly conservative and middle-class, had lost much of its raison d'être. The conservative Kramář was out of touch with the left-leaning mood of the voters, and because he was in Paris for the first months of 1919, credit for his reforms went to his finance minister, Alois Rašin, and Antonín Švehla. Kramář represented Czechoslovakia at the Paris Peace Conference, 1919 but resigned over Foreign Minister Beneš's failure to support anti-communist forces in Russia.

Kramář wanted to keep the Czechoslovak Legions fighting in the Russian Civil War until all of Russia was "liberated" from the Bolsheviks, arguing the Czechoslovak Legion should be headed towards Moscow, not Vladivostok. Kramář further believed that once all of Russia came under the rule of Admiral Alexander Kolchak, a "Slavic federation" would be created uniting Russia, Poland and Czechoslovakia together. Both Masaryk and his protégé Beneš saw Kramář as the main danger to Czechoslovak democracy, regarding him as a "reactionary" Czech chauvinist who was opposed to their plans for Czechoslovakia as a multicultural, multiethnic state. Masaryk and Beneš both doubted Kramář's commitment to "Western values" such as democracy, enlightenment, rationality and tolerance, seeing him as a romantic Pan-Slavist, who looked towards the east rather the west for ideas, which meant the weight of "the Hrad" ("the castle"), as Czechs called the presidency, was thrown to marginalize Kramář as a political force.

In turn, Kramář resented the way in which Masaryk openly groomed Beneš as his successor, noting that Masaryk put in articles into the constitution setting the age limit for senators at 45, but the age limit for the presidency at 35, which conveniently made Beneš eligible for the presidency. The charge of Czech chauvinism against Kramář had some substance, as he openly proclaimed his belief that the Czechs should be the dominant people in Czechoslovakia, denounced Masaryk and Beneš for their belief that the Sudeten Germans should be equal to the Czechs and made clear his opposition to having German as one of the official languages of Czechoslovakia. Kramář announced that the state should strive so that within 50 years, the state border would correspond with the linguistic border, and the German-language areas would be eliminated.

After the first general election in Czechoslovakia, Kramář's party, now the National Democratic Party, became a minor player in the various interwar governments of the new state. Later, Kramář worked together with Jiří Stříbrný and František Mareš in the National Union (Národní sjednocení). As part of their effort to marginalise Kramář, Masaryk and Beneš started to promote a historical narrative that portrayed "the resistance abroad" in the war as the "true" liberators and the founders of the republic, and the "domestic resistance" were disparaged as collaborators with the House of Habsburg. In what became known as the Boj legendistů ("the battle of the legend makers"), until the 1920s Kramář and his allies fought Masaryk and Beneš in a war of words in the press over who was the "true" founders of Czechoslovakia.

The Boj legendistů began in 1922, when Kramář published his book Five Lectures on Foreign Affairs. An extremely hostile book review of Five Lectures on Foreign Affairs was published in the newspaper Čas under the initials V.S., but it was quickly realised the author was Masaryk. A number of articles were subsequently published in which Masaryk accused "the domestic resistance" of having done nothing of note during the war, and he accused Kramář of still being loyal to the House of Habsburg as late of 1919, taking out of context Kramář's remark at the Paris Peace Conference that he was still a monarchist at heart. Masaryk further argued, based on the memoirs of Count Maximilian von Coundenhove, the Austrian commander in Prague in 1918, that the work of the "domestic resistance" in proclaiming Czechoslovak independence on 28 October 1918 had been ineffective and implied that Kramář was actually working with Coundenhove to preserve Austrian rule over the Czech lands.

Writing in 2009, the American historian Andrea Orzoff wrote that the extent that Kramář lost the Boj legendistů of the 1920s could be seen even today since most Czechs still revere Masaryk as the "President-Liberator" and, to a lesser extent, the memory of Beneš is still venerated, but Kramář has largely been forgotten in popular memory.

During his time in the National Assembly (1918–1937), Kramář worked in the Committee for Foreign Affairs and made many speeches on foreign policy. Kramář developed a system of dividing countries into popular and unpopular nations. Countries such as the United Kingdom, France and the Russian Empire were in the popular category. On the other hand, Germany, the Soviet Union and Hungary were in the unpopular category.

=== Views on Bolshevism and the Soviet Union ===
Kramář saw Bolshevism as a dangerous German creation and believed that they would remain loyal to Germany. He also consistently rejected the idea of centralised production and the utopian vision of a classless society. Still, Kramář doubted the long-term viability of Bolshevism, which he thought was unpopular and maintained only through terror. He sincerely hoped that the Soviet Union would collapse during his lifetime.

== See also ==
- Neo-Slavism
