= Czechoslovak National Democracy =

Czechoslovak National Democracy Československá národní demokracie
- Abbreviation: ČsND
- President: Dr. Karel Kramář
- Founded: 25 March 1919
- Dissolved: 27 October 1934
- Merger of: Young Czechs, State's Right Progressives, Moravian Progressive Party, Moravian-Silesian People's Party; Czech Constitutionalist Progressive Party; Czech Realist Party
- Merged into: National Unification
- Headquarters: Prague, Bohemia, Czechoslovakia
- Newspaper: The National Newspaper
- Youth wing: Young Generation
- Ideology: National liberalism National conservatism Czechoslovak nationalism
- Political position: Right-wing
- Colours: Dark blue

The Czechoslovak National Democracy (Czech: Československá národní demokracie), also known as the Czechoslovak National Democratic Party (Czech: Československá strana národně demokratická), was a First Republic right-wing political party in Czechoslovakia.

== History ==
The party was established in 1918 by a merger of the Free-minded National Party ("Young Czechs") and several smaller parties such as the State's Rights Progressives, the Moravian Progressive Party, and the Moravian-Silesian People's Party. It was initially known as the Czech Constitutional Democratic Party. It formed the first provisional government led by Karel Kramář, and the following year it was renamed the National Democracy.

The National Democratic Party also cooperated with smaller political parties. From 1924 to 1934 it cooperated with the Russian National Party, running alongside them in the 1924, 1925, and 1929 elections. It contested seats for the Chamber of Deputies in Slovakia together with the Slovak National Party led by Martin Rázus.

In 1935 the party merged with the National League and the National Front to form the National Unification.

== Electoral results ==
Chamber of Deputies
| Election year | # of overall votes | % of overall vote | # of overall seats won | +/– | Leader |
|---|---|---|---|---|---|
| 1920 | 387,552 (#6) | 6.25 | 19 / 281 | – | Karel Kramář |
| 1925 | 284,628 (#12) | 4.1 | 13 / 300 | ▼6 | Karel Kramář |
| 1929 | 359,547 (#9) | 4.9 | 15 / 300 | ▲2 | Karel Kramář |
| 1935 | 458,351 (#8) | 5.6 | 17 / 300 | ▲2 | Karel Kramář |

Senate
| Election year | # of overall votes | % of overall vote | # of overall seats won | +/– | Leader |
| 1920 | 354,561 (#6) | 6.78 | 10 / 142 | – | Karel Kramář |
| 1925 | 256,360 (#11) | 4.2 | 7 / 150 | ▼3 | Karel Kramář |
| 1929 | 325,023 (#9) | 5.0 | 8 / 150 | ▲1 | Karel Kramář |
| 1935 | 410,095 (#8) | 5.6 | 9 / 150 | ▲1 | Karel Kramář |

== See also ==
- Národní sdružení odborových organizací – the labour wing of the party
- Category:Czechoslovak National Democracy politicians
