= Masaryk =

Masaryk is a Slovak surname. Notable people with the surname include:

- Alice Masaryk (1879–1966), Czech sociologist and one of the founding members of the Czechoslovak Red Cross, the daughter of Tomáš Garrigue Masaryk
- Andy Masaryk (born 1999), Slovak footballer
- Charlotte Garrigue Masaryk, American-born wife of Tomáš Garrigue Masaryk
- Fritzi Massary (1882–1969, born Massaryk), Austrian-American soprano singer and actress
- Herbert Masaryk (1880–1915), Czech painter, the son of Tomáš Garrigue Masaryk
- Jan Masaryk (1886–1948), Czech diplomat and politician, the son of Tomáš Garrigue Masaryk
- Pavol Masaryk (born 1980), Slovak football striker
- Tomáš Garrigue Masaryk (1850–1937), Czech statesman in Austria-Hungary and Czechoslovakia, sociologist, philosopher, and the first President and founder of Czechoslovakia

== Places ==
- Avenida Masaryk, luxury shopping street in Mexico City
