= Masaryk (disambiguation) =

Masaryk is a Slovak surname.

Masaryk may also refer to:

- 1841 Masaryk, an outer main-belt asteroid
- A Prominent Patient, a 2017 Czech film, known as Masaryk
- Avenida Presidente Masaryk, an important avenue in Mexico City
- Kfar Masaryk (village of Masaryk), a kibbutz in northern Israel
- Masaryk Circuit, a Czech racing circuit
- Masaryk University, the second largest university in the Czech Republic
