= Lány Castle =

Castle in the Czech Republic

- Zámek Lány
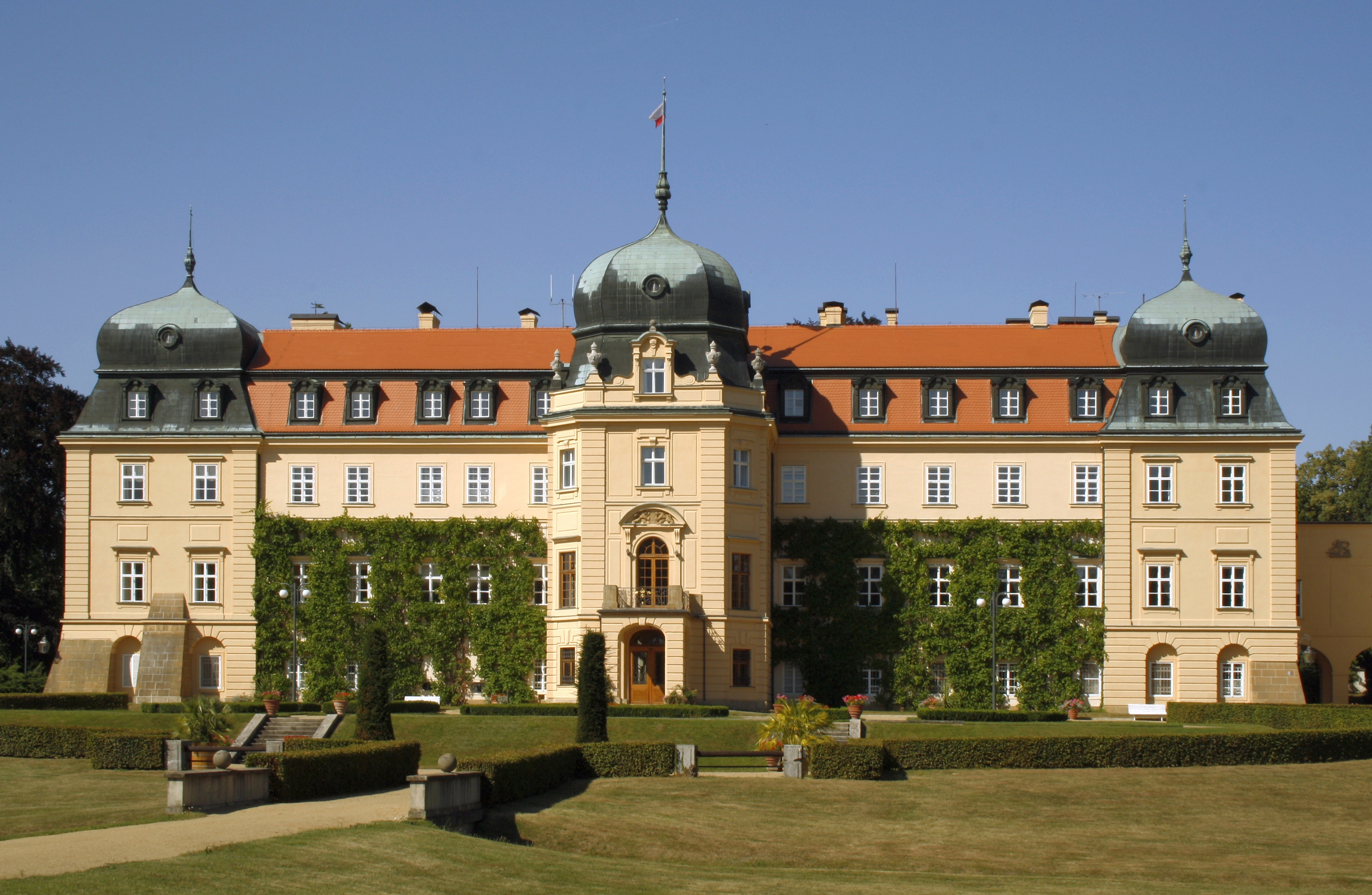
- Front view

General information
- Architectural style: Eclectic
- Location: Lány, Czech Republic
- Coordinates: 50°07′26″N 13°57′23″E
- Current tenants: Petr Pavel (2023–present)

Recording of the Church of the Holy name of Jesus's bell (1937)

Lány Castle (Czech: zámek Lány) is a manor house in Lány in the Central Bohemian Region of the Czech Republic. The current structure, built in the late 15th century, sits on the site of a medieval fortress. The originally Renaissance building was remodeled in the Baroque style in the 17th century before undergoing further architectural modifications in the early 20th century. It is the summer residence of the president of the Czech Republic.

== Early history ==
In the Middle Ages, a wooden fortress existed on the site of the current Lány Castle.

In the late 16th century, Rudolf II acquired the lands surrounding the historical fortress at Lány, constructing the present building for use as a hunting lodge on the site of the former structure. At the beginning of the 17th century, Lány Castle was extensively renovated in the Baroque style.

Lány Castle later passed to the ownership of the Waldstein family and, subsequently, to the Swabian princely House of Fürstenberg. During the Fürstenberg ownership, a connected chapel – the Church of the Holy Name of Jesus – was constructed.

== 20th century ==
Lány Castle was again renovated in 1902. In 1921, the newly independent Czechoslovakia purchased the estate from the Fürstenbergs for governmental use. Landscaping of the building's grounds was overseen by Jože Plečnik who designed the castle's fountain, which features five Doric columns embedded with lion heads representing Bohemia, Moravia, Silesia, Slovakia, and Carpathian Ruthenia.

As President of Czechoslovakia, Tomáš Masaryk used Lány Castle as his country retreat. On 20 December 1935, a week after Masaryk's retirement, the National Assembly unanimously enacted legislation granting him use of the castle for life. Following his 1937 death, it was redesignated as the summer residence of the President of Czechoslovakia, though used only sporadically for that purpose.

During the period of the Protectorate of Bohemia and Moravia, Lány Castle served as the seat of the presidency of the protectorate, while Prague Castle was used as the official residence of the Protector. The 1st Battalion of the Government Army provided security and public duties at the estate.

== Later history ==
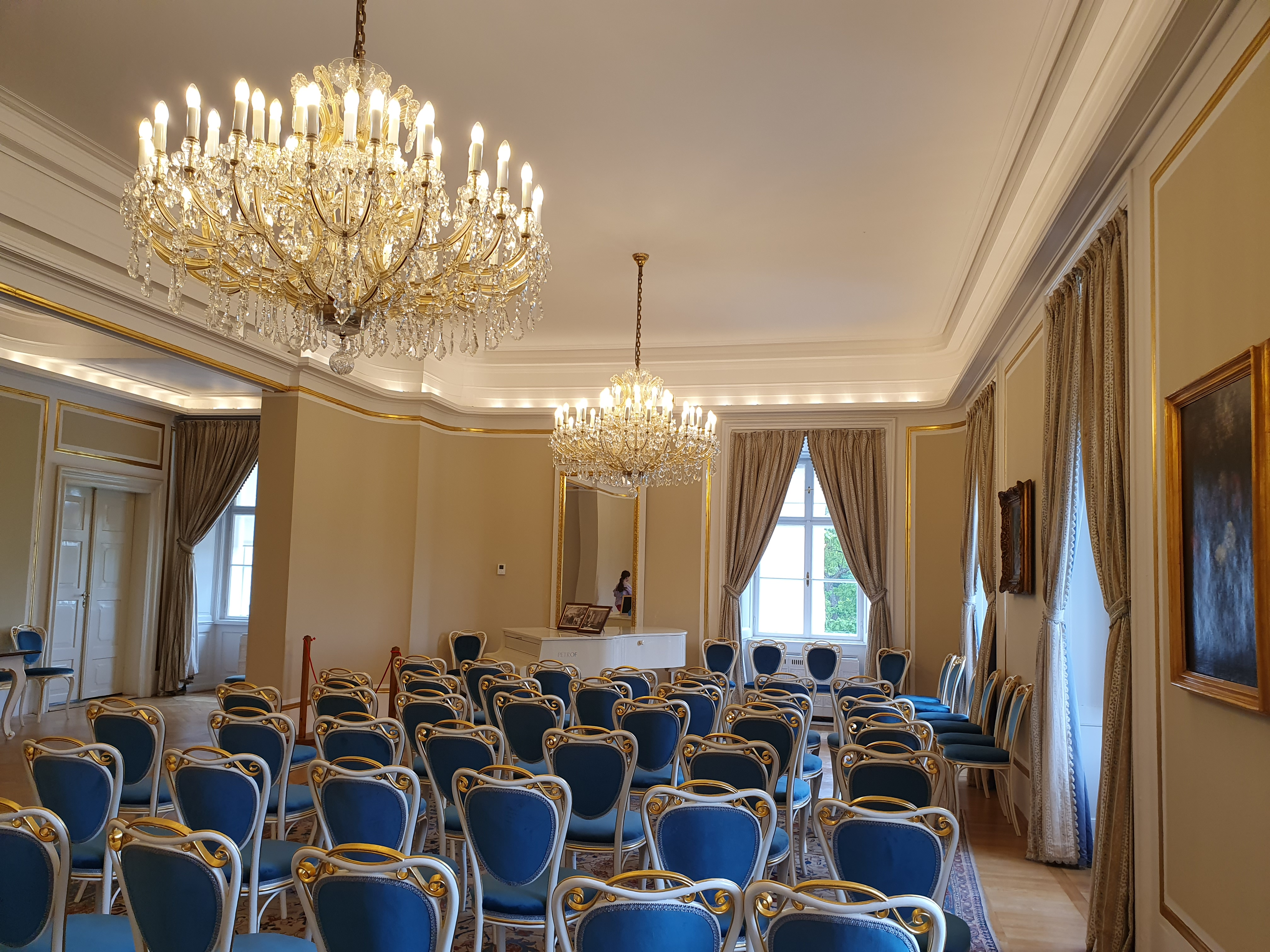
Concert saloon in the castle

Lány Castle is used as the summer residence of the President of the Czech Republic. Notable visitors to Lány Castle since the 1993 creation of the Czech Republic include the 14th Dalai Lama, President of Poland Lech Kaczyński, President of Austria Heinz Fischer, President of Serbia Aleksandar Vučić and others. In 2019, it was the site of the summit of the Visegrád Group and, in 2021, Petr Fiala was officially installed as Prime Minister of the Czech Republic at Lány Castle where President Miloš Zeman was at the time convalescing from illness.

The state rooms of the building were opened for public visitation for the first time in 2023.

== See also ==
- Hořovice Castle
