= Marie Schneiderová-Zubaníková =

Czech civil engineer and architect (1900–1966)

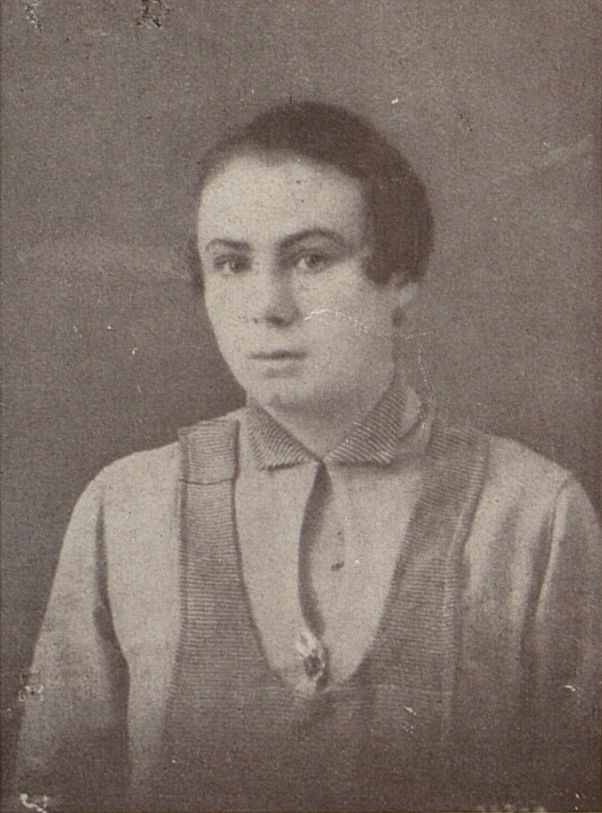
- Born: Marie Zubaníková; 14 March 1900; České Budějovice, Austria-Hungary
- Died: 11 September 1966 (aged 66); Chevy Chase, Maryland
- Education: Czech Technical University in Prague
- Occupation: engineer architect

Marie Schneiderová-Zubaníková (14 March 1900 – 11 September 1966) was a Czech civil engineer and architect. She was the first woman to qualify as a civil engineer in Czechoslovakia.

== Early life and education ==
Marie Zubaníková was born on 14 March 1900 in České Budějovice, Bohemia, Austria-Hungary. to Božena Zubaníková-Váňová and Bohumil Zubaník, chief engineer of the state railways in České Budějovice.

On 30 June 1923, she became the first woman in Czechoslovakia to graduate in civil engineering at the Czech Technical University in Prague. Her degree course covered physics and chemistry, geology, meteorology and climatology, technical drawing, hydraulics, general machine science, maths, electrical engineering, mechanical engineering, statics and dynamics, geodesy, building construction, road construction and earthworks, railway construction, tunnel construction, water construction and bridge construction, public law, and national economics.

== Career ==
In 1924, through the agency of Stanislav Špaček, Marie Zubaníková was sent to the USA on an internship scheme by the Masarykovou akademií práce (Masaryk Academy of Labour), the first woman engineer to do so. She sailed to the United States on 24 June 1924 on the ship Leviathan from French port in Cherbourgh, and arrived in New York on 30 June 1924.

Between 1925 and 1929, Marie Zubaníková worked as a designer and structural engineer in Chicago for the Architectural Department at Sears Roebuck. She worked on a large project for a new factory in the port district of New York-New Jersey, working out calculations to strengthen the concrete structure. Whilst in Chicago she attended lectures on advertising, economics and accounting at the Technical University. During her internship she published professional articles on issues facing women in America, covering subject such as women's work in factories, women in engineering, public life and policy.

On 8 January 1928, she was elected vice-president of the American Association of Czechoslovak Engineers in Chicago, where she met its chairman, Ing. Dr. Josef Schneider, visiting professor at the University of Chicago visiting from her alma mater, the Czech Technical University in Prague. They went on to marry and she expanded her name to Marie Schneiderová-Zubaníková.

In 1929 Marie Schneiderová-Zubaníková returned to the Czechoslovak Republic, where she was appointed technical advisor to Alice Masaryková, political campaigner and chairwoman of the Czech Red Cross. Schneiderová-Zubaníková worked as the head of housing hygiene at the Institute of Public Health in Prague for the next few years.

Schneiderová-Zubaníková was interested in improving household efficiency. On 8 July 1930 she filed a patent for a mobile washing table.

She was a member of the Chicago Female Architect's Club, a member of the American Association of University Women, a member of the National Geographic Society and a member of the Czechoslovakia Engineers Institute (SIA).

== Personal life ==
In 1938 or 1939 Marie Schneiderová-Zubaníková returned to the US with her husband to avoid the increasing turbulence in Czechoslovakia, and settled temporarily in Bata Shoe Village, in Belcamp, Maryland where there was a large Czech population. When Josef Schneider became a teacher at Madison College in Harrisburg, Virginia, so they moved there.

Schneiderová-Zubaníková enjoyed travelling, across the USA, India and Europe. She was an excellent pianist and violinist, and enjoyed sport, especially tennis and horseriding.

Marie Schneiderová-Zubaníková died on 11 September 1966 in Chevy Chase, Maryland.

== Publications ==
She published over 30 articles:

- Racionální plán bytu a domácnosti (Rational plan of the apartment and household)
- Hygiena bydlení (Housing hygiene)
- Nejmenší byty (The smallest apartments)
- Americké rodinné domky a zahrádky (American family homes and gardens)
- Vytápění rodinných domků (Heating of family houses)
- Racionální odstraňování odpadků (Rational waste disposal)
- Americká stadia (American Stadia)
- Americké mrakodrapy (American skyscrapers)
