= Lány (Kladno District) =

- Municipality
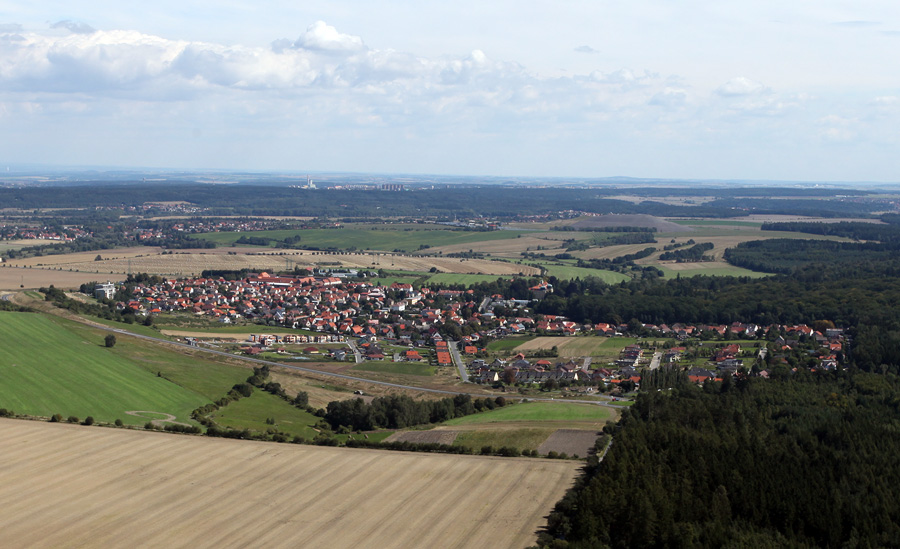
- Aerial view

- Flag Coat of arms

- Location in the Czech Republic
- Coordinates: 50°7′23″N 13°57′2″E
- Country: Czech Republic
- Region: Central Bohemian
- District: Kladno
- First mention: 1392

Area
  - Total: 33.97 km^{2} (13.12 sq mi)
- Elevation: 421 m (1,381 ft)

Population (2026-01-01)
  - Total: 2,294
  - Density: 67.53/km^{2} (174.9/sq mi)
- Time zone: UTC+1 (CET)
  - Summer (DST): UTC+2 (CEST)
- Postal code: 270 61
- Website: www.obec-lany.cz

Lány is a municipality and village in Kladno District in the Central Bohemian Region of the Czech Republic. It has about 2,300 inhabitants. The main landmark is the Lány Castle, known as the residence of the Czech and Czechoslovak presidents. Tomáš Garrigue Masaryk, the first President of Czechoslovakia, lived here and is buried at the Lány cemetery.

== Administrative division ==
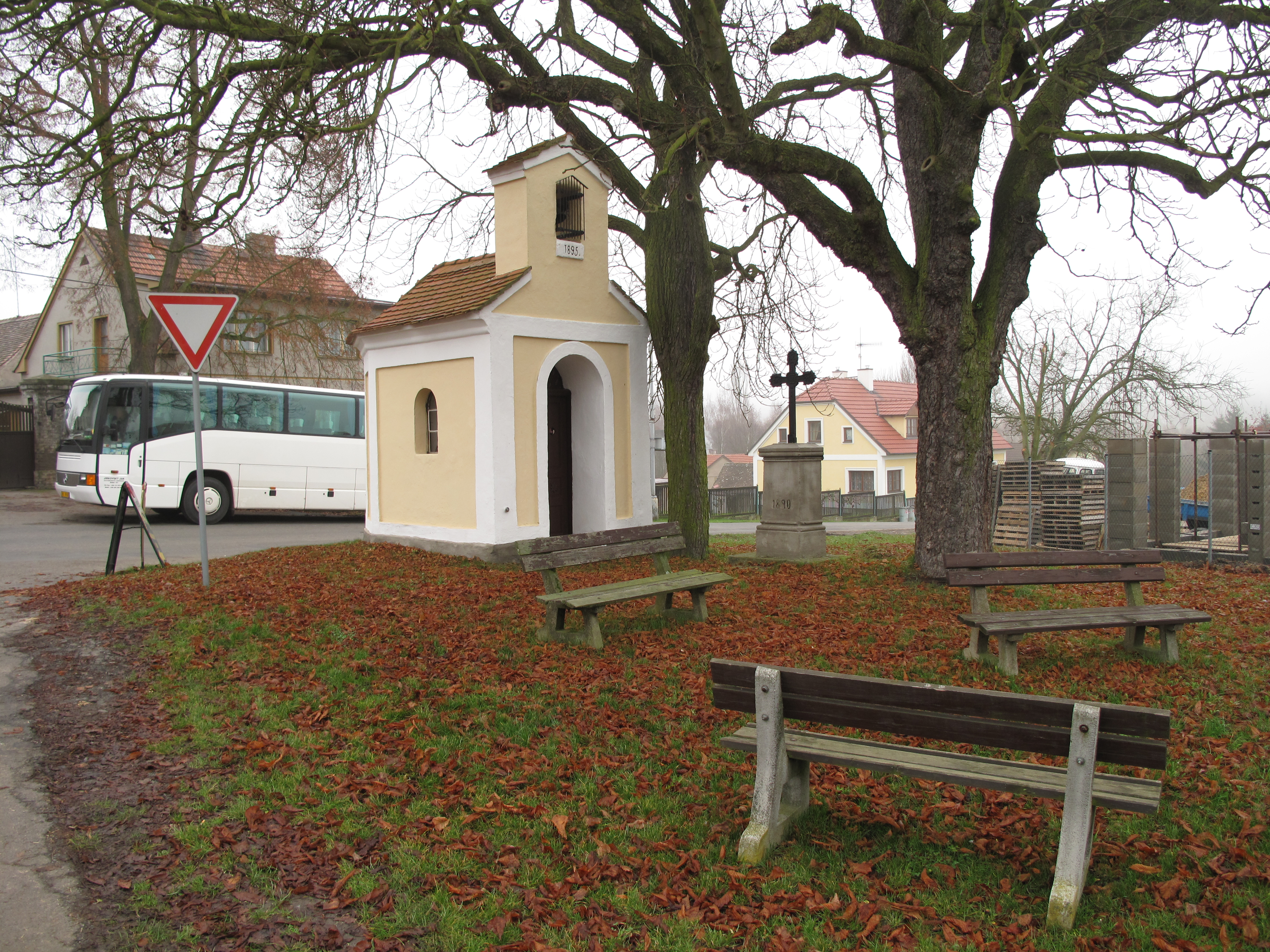
The village of Vašírov

Lány consists of two municipal parts (in brackets population according to the 2021 census):

- Lány (2,046)
- Vašírov (183)

== Etymology ==
The Czech word lány means 'fields' or 'tracts (of land)'. In older times, the word also denoted land belonging to one court (land cultivated by one person in one cultivation period).

== Geography ==
Lány lies about 9 kilometres (6 mi) west of Kladno and 35 km (22 mi) west of Prague. Most of the municipality is located in the Křivoklát Highlands and in the Křivoklátsko Protected Landscape Area. The highest point is at 465 m (1,526 ft) above sea level.

== History ==
The first written mention of Lány is from 1392, when there was a wooden fortress. The village often changed owners. From 1581, it was property of Jiřík Bořita Martinic. He sold it to Emperor Rudolf II in 1589. The emperor had replaced the fortress with a Renaissance hunting lodge.

Until 1658, Lány was property of the royal chamber, but then it was purchased by the Schwarzenberg family. They merged Lány with the Křivoklát estate. The Waldstein family bought the estate at the end of the 17th century. After Marie Anna of Waldstein married Prince Joseph Wilhelm Fürstenberg, the estate fell to the Fürstenberg family, which held Lány until 1921.

The second oldest horse-drawn iron wagonway in continental Europe operated between Prague and Lány (originally planned to reach Plzeň) from 1831 until 1869. Its final station was in present-day forester's lodge of Píně.

== Demographics ==
Historical population

Year	Pop.	±%
1869	1,308	—
1880	1,158	−11.5%
1890	1,118	−3.5%
1900	1,291	+15.5%
1910	1,396	+8.1%

Year	Pop.	±%
1921	1,349	−3.4%
1930	1,573	+16.6%
1950	1,452	−7.7%
1961	1,615	+11.2%
1970	1,603	−0.7%

Year	Pop.	±%
1980	1,649	+2.9%
1991	1,607	−2.5%
2001	1,597	−0.6%
2011	1,937	+21.3%
2021	2,229	+15.1%

Source: Censuses

== Transport ==
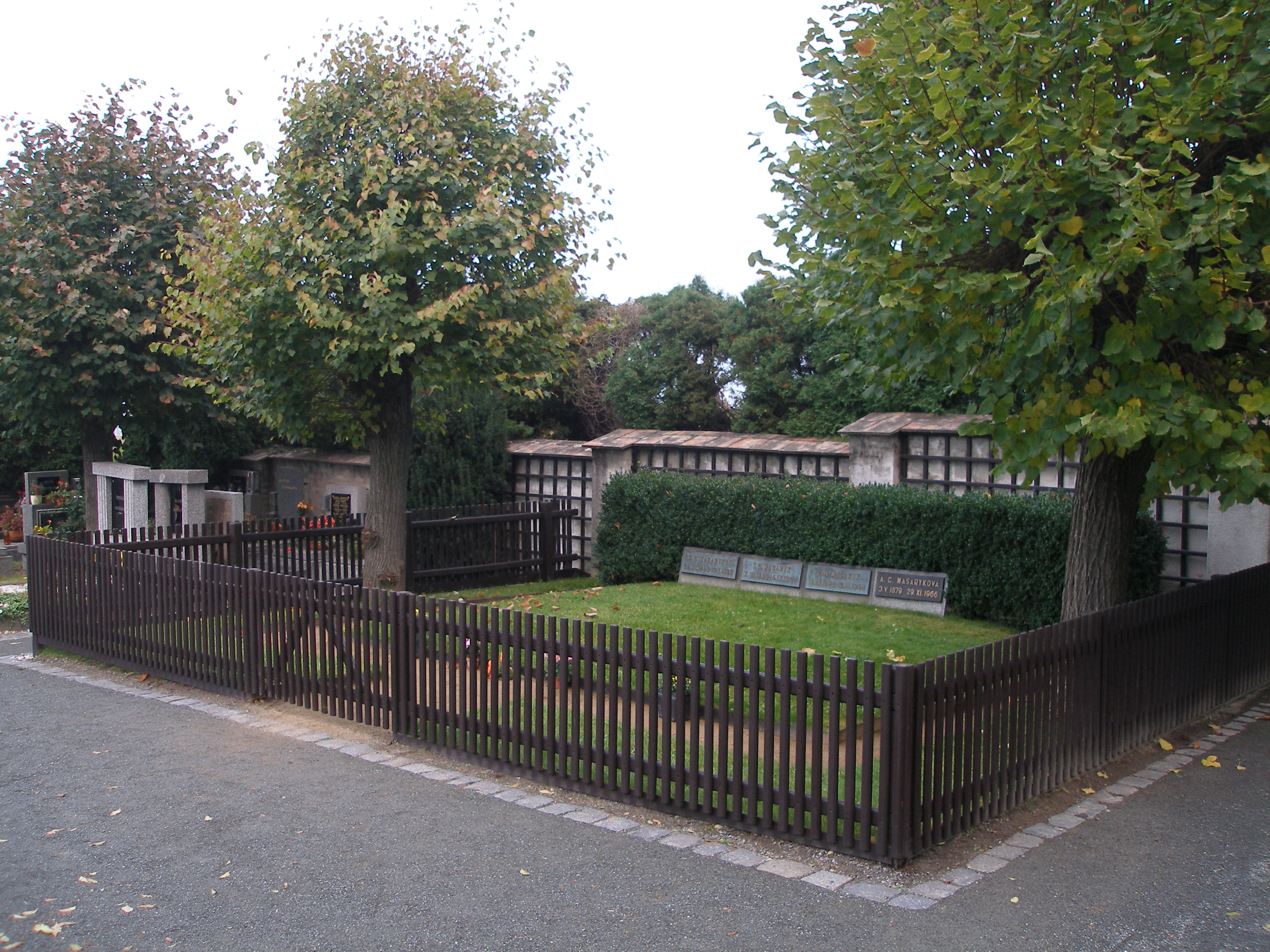
Tomb of the Masaryk family

Lány is served by the railway station in Stochov, located close to the municipal border.

== Sights ==
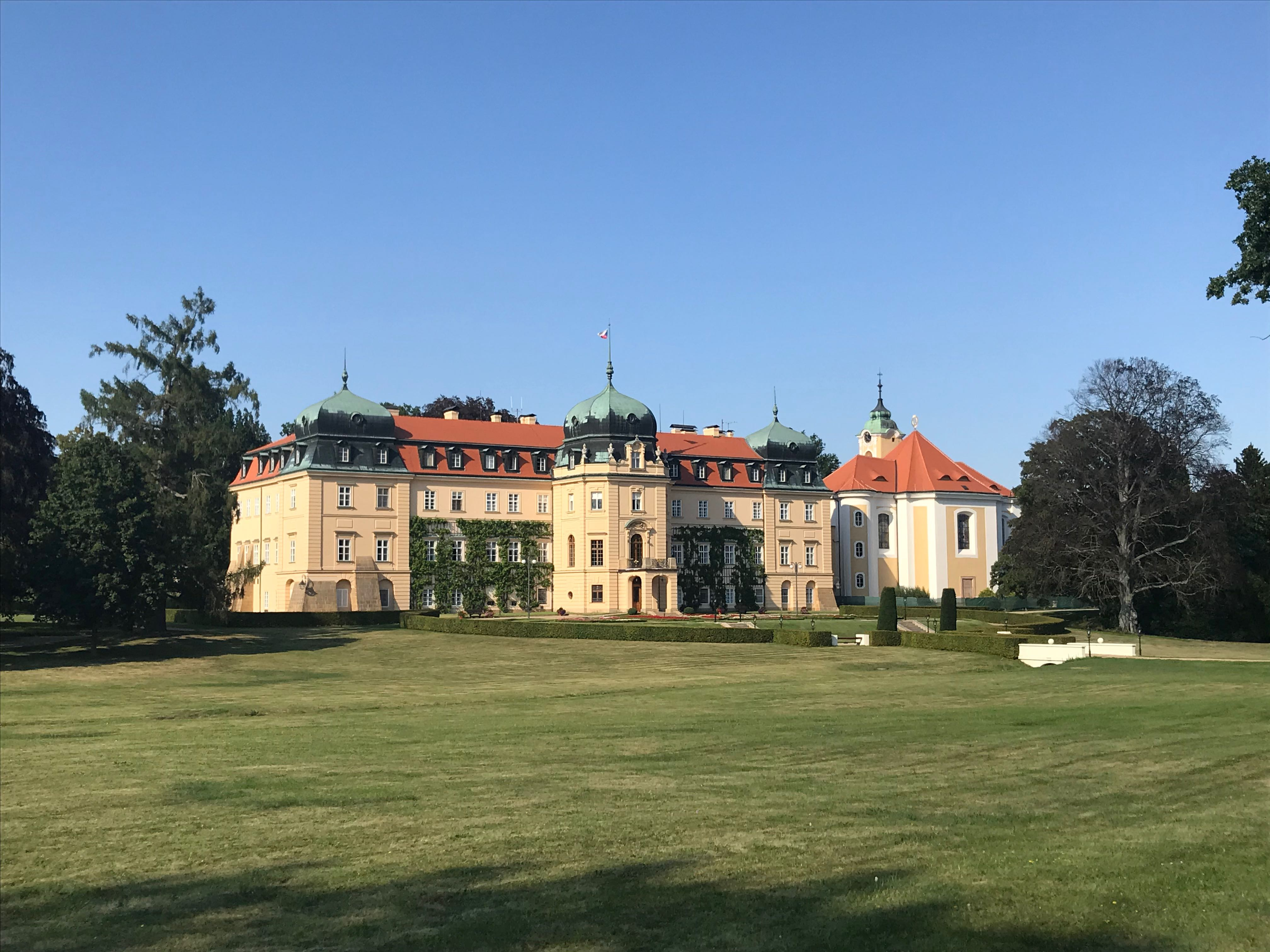
Lány Castle and Church of the Holy Name of Jesus

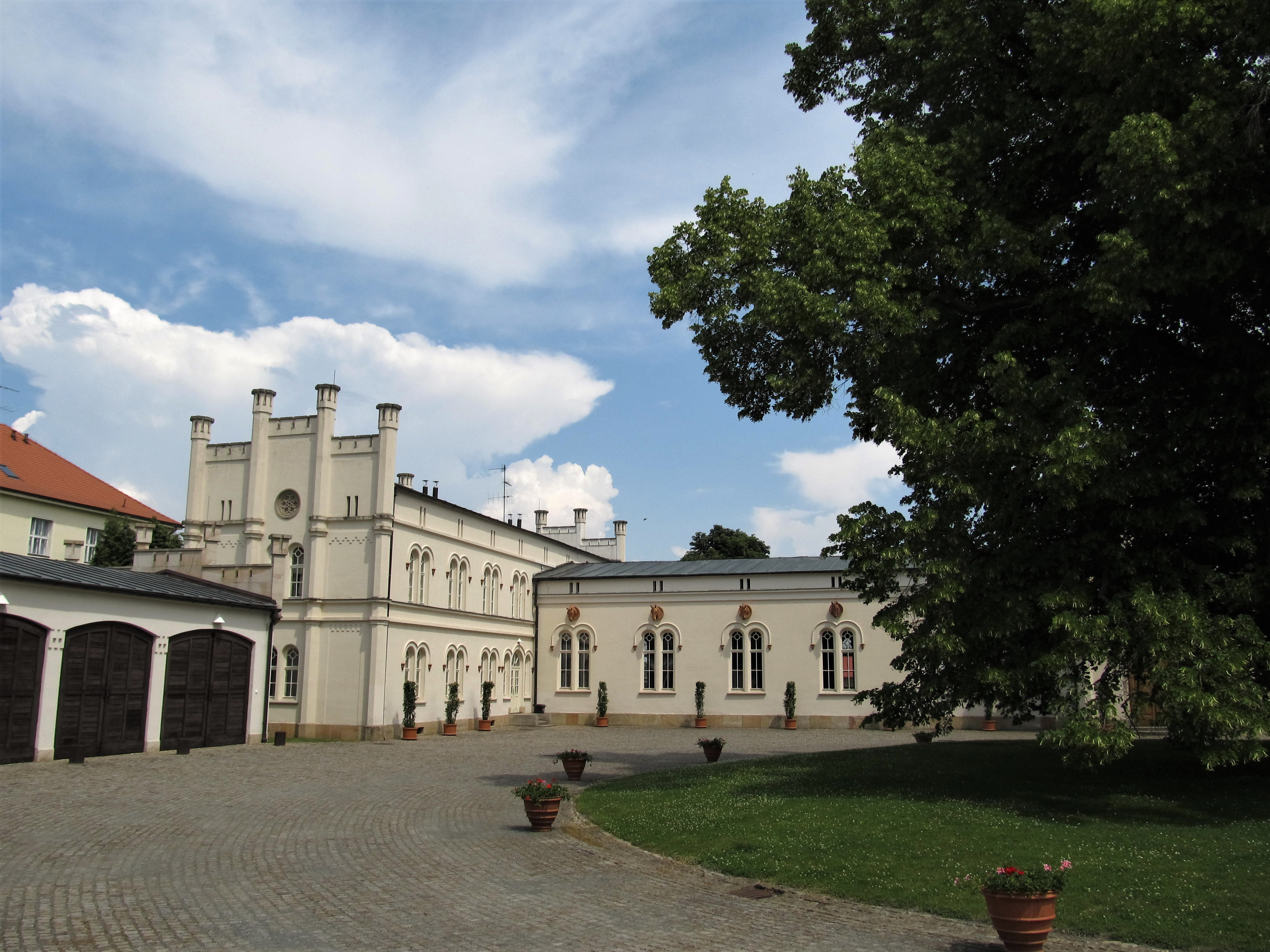
Horse stable of the castle

The major landmark of Lány is Lány Castle. At the end of the 16th century, the local fortress was rebuilt into a Renaissance hunting lodge. It was rebuilt into a Baroque castle in the 17th century. Another floor was added in 1730. The game park in the woods near the castle was established in 1713 and the large castle park was founded in 1770. The castle acquired its current appearance after a major reconstruction in 1902–1903. In 1921, it was purchased by the Czechoslovak state and designated as an official summer presidential residence. Slovene architect Jože Plečnik reconstructed the castle and its park in 1921–1924. T. G. Masaryk liked the castle and was allowed to stay there after his abdication in 1935 until his death in 1937. During World War II, the castle was a residence of Emil Hácha, President of Protectorate of Bohemia and Moravia, and then it was used sporadically.

After the Velvet Revolution, the tradition was revived by Václav Havel, the first president of the Czech Republic. Since then, it has been a place of many official sessions between the president and other top politicians. The castle itself is closed to the public. The castle park is partially accessible.

The Church of the Holy Name of Jesus was originally built as a castle chapel. It was built in the Rococo style in 1748–1752 and it is connected to the castle by a covered passage.

A reconstructed Baroque building of a former granary houses the Museum of T. G. Masaryk. The museum presents the life and living of the entire Masaryk family, the period of World War I, the Czechoslovak Legion and the establishment of the First Czechoslovak Republic. There is also a small exhibition about the municipality.

The Masaryk family tomb is located in the local cemetery, where, in addition to Tomáš and Charlotte, their children Jan and Alice are also buried. The tomb has become a symbol of Czechoslovak democracy, especially in the era of Czechoslovak Socialist Republic. The tomb of Tomáš Garrigue Masaryk is protected as a national cultural monument.

The Ice Hockey Hall of Fame is a small museum devoted to the history of Czech and Czechoslovak ice hockey. It contains a collection of jerseys, ice hockey sticks, photos, pieces of equipment, publications, and medals.

== Notable people ==
- Charlotte Garrigue Masaryk (1850–1923), First Lady of Czechoslovakia; lived here, died here and is buried here
- Tomáš Garrigue Masaryk (1850–1937), first President of Czechoslovakia; lived here, died here and is buried here
- Zdeněk Nedvěd (born 1975), ice hockey player
