= Zdeněk Nedvěd =

Czech ice hockey player

- Born: March 3, 1975 (age 50) Lány, Czechoslovakia
- Height: 6 ft 0 in (183 cm)
- Weight: 180 lb (82 kg; 12 st 12 lb)
- Position: Right wing
- Shot: Left
- Played for: Toronto Maple Leafs
- NHL draft: 123rd overall, 1993; Toronto Maple Leafs
- Playing career: 1995–2011

Zdeněk Nedvěd (born March 3, 1975) is a Czech former professional ice hockey player who played 31 games in the National Hockey League. He played for the Toronto Maple Leafs.

== Career ==
Nedved never became a regular in the league. He was a fine puck handler with a good wrist shot but he was unable to fight through the close checking of the NHL with regularity. Nedved was a teenage star with Poldi Kladno. His family sent him to North America to play junior and develop his game more completely. Nedved became a fine scorer with the OHL's Sudbury Wolves and was chosen 123rd overall by the Toronto Maple Leafs in 1993. He scored 97 goals in his last two years of junior and represented the Czech Republic at the World Junior Championships in 1994 and 1995. During the 1994 tourney played in his homeland, Nedved was among the top scorers while wreaking havoc in the offensive zone with David Výborný.

Nedved played one game for Toronto late in 1994-95 then prepared for the upcoming training camp. He made the 1995-96 edition of the Leafs and scored a goal early in the season opener against the Pittsburgh Penguins. Nedved's play tailed off over the next month and he was sent down to the St. John's Maple Leafs of the American Hockey League. Eventually, his season was ruined by a serious shoulder injury suffered in a mishap during practice. The next year Nedved played 23 games for Toronto but was unable to perform consistently. Nedved played for St. John's then the IHL's Long Beach Ice Dogs before leaving North America in 1998.

He moved back to his homeland where he played for HC Sparta Praha in 1998-1999. He then moved to Finland's SM-liiga and spent 4 seasons with Lukko Rauma. He then spent two seasons in the Deutsche Eishockey Liga in Germany with the Kassel Huskies and the Hannover Scorpions before returning to Finland with Kärpät ahead of the 2004–05 seasons. His stay in Finland was short however, and after only four games, Nedved moved to Norway to play the remainder of the season for the Stavanger Oilers.

Nedved then spent two seasons with Anyang Halla in Asia. He moved back to the Czech Extraliga at the age of 32 to play for HC Kladno in 2007. In 2010, he was playing in Slovakia for HKm Zvolen.

== Personal life ==
Nedvěd is the son of long-time HC Kladno hockey player Zdeněk Nedvěd, who won four Czechoslovak First Ice Hockey League titles with the club in the 1970s. His brother, Roman Nedvěd, also played for Kladno between 1986 and 1991.

== Career statistics ==
=== Regular season and playoffs ===
			Regular season					Playoffs
Season	Team	League	GP	G	A	Pts	PIM	GP	G	A	Pts	PIM
1991–92	Rytiri Kladno U20	Czech U20	19	15	12	27	22	—	—	—	—	—
1992–93	Sudbury Wolves	OHL	19	3	9	12	6	—	—	—	—	—
1993–94	Sudbury Wolves	OHL	60	50	50	100	42	10	7	8	15	10
1994–95	Sudbury Wolves	OHL	59	47	51	98	36	18	12	16	28	16
1994–95	Toronto Maple Leafs	NHL	1	0	0	0	2	—	—	—	—	—
1995–96	Toronto Maple Leafs	NHL	7	1	1	2	6	—	—	—	—	—
1995–96	St. John's Maple Leafs	AHL	41	13	14	27	22	4	2	0	2	0
1996–97	Toronto Maple Leafs	NHL	23	3	5	8	6	—	—	—	—	—
1996–97	St. John's Maple Leafs	AHL	51	9	25	34	34	7	2	2	4	6
1997–98	St. John's Maple Leafs	AHL	45	7	8	15	24	3	1	0	1	2
1997–98	Long Beach Ice Dogs	IHL	19	3	8	11	18	—	—	—	—	—
1998–99	HC Sparta Praha	Czech	10	0	2	2	8	—	—	—	—	—
1998–99	Lukko	Liiga	30	4	7	11	22	—	—	—	—	—
1999–00	Lukko	Liiga	54	28	18	46	50	4	0	0	0	2
2000–01	Lukko	Liiga	51	17	14	31	36	1	0	0	0	0
2001–02	HPK	Liiga	55	18	15	33	38	8	4	3	7	0
2002–03	Kassel Huskies	DEL	48	16	10	26	26	7	1	1	2	4
2003–04	Hannover Scorpions	DEL	51	12	17	29	28	5	2	1	3	2
2004–05	Kärpät	Liiga	4	0	0	0	2	—	—	—	—	—
2004–05	Stavanger Oilers	Norway	26	14	6	20	28	3	1	1	2	0
2005–06	Anyang Halla	Asia	38	26	23	49	18	4	1	2	3	0
2006–07	Anyang Halla	Asia	28	16	20	36	36	3	2	2	4	20
2007–08	HC Kladno	Czech	29	4	4	8	28	9	0	2	2	4
2008–09	HC Kladno	Czech	14	1	3	4	4	—	—	—	—	—
2009–10	HK Lev Slany	Czech4	2	0	2	2	0	—	—	—	—	—
2009–10	HC Banska Bystrica	Slovak	15	4	5	9	6	—	—	—	—	—
2009–10	HKM Zvolen	Slovak	21	6	5	11	10	5	2	1	3	0
2010–11	IHC Pisek	Czech2	12	3	5	8	6	—	—	—	—	—
2010–11	HK Lev Slany	Czech4	5	2	3	5	6	—	—	—	—	—
2010–11	HC Merano	Italy2	14	6	9	15	14	—	—	—	—	—
NHL totals			31	4	6	10	14	—	—	—	—	—
AHL totals			137	29	47	76	80	14	5	2	7	8

=== International ===
Year	Team	Event	Result	GP	G	A	Pts	PIM
1994	Czech Republic	WJC20	5th	7	4	3	7	10
1995	Czech Republic	WJC20	6th	7	4	4	8	10
Junior totals				14	8	7	15	20
