= Hedwig Tusar-Taxis =

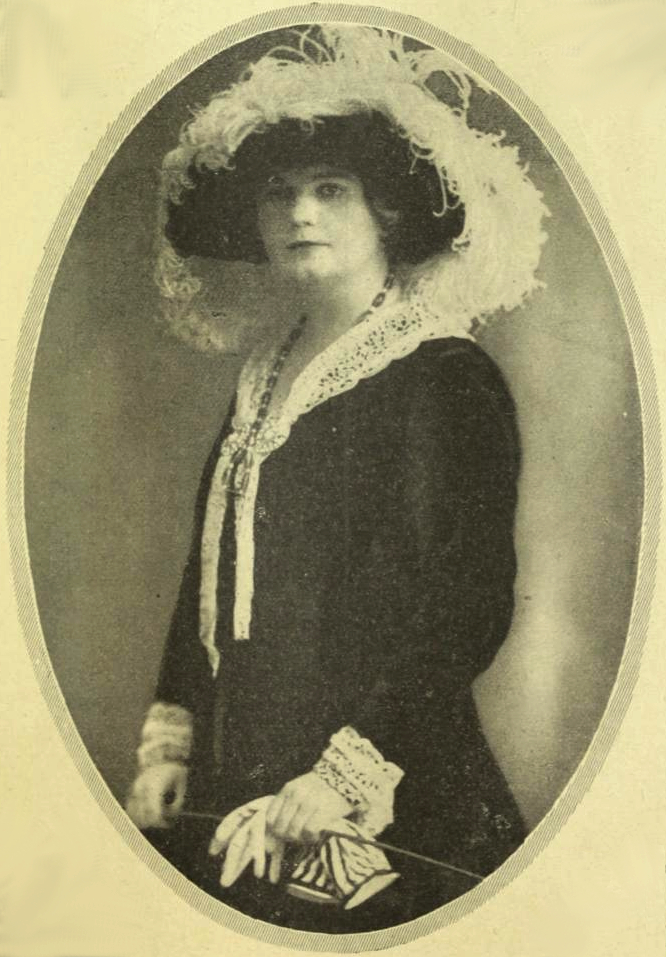
- Born: 23 April 1891; Rapotín, Moravia, Austria-Hungary
- Died: 5 April 1978 (aged 86); Vienna, Austria
- Occupations: Spouse of the prime minister of Czechoslovakia, Vlastimil Tusar

Hedwig Tusar-Taxis (born Hedwig Welzel, also known as Hedvika Tusarová, Frau Heda Tusar and Baroness Hedda Taxis-Tusar; 23 April 1891 – 05 April 1978) was, through her first marriage, the wife of Vlastimil Tusar, second Prime Minister of Czechoslovakia. Through her second marriage to Maria Emil Freiherr Taxis von Bordogna und Valnigra, she received the title Baroness.

== Life ==
Tusar-Taxis was the daughter of Josef Welzel and his wife Adelheid. She is described as having a humble background, and was a teacher in Vienna before her marriage.

In spring 1917, in Vienna, she met Vlastimil Tusar, then a member of the Austrian Reichsrat, who had been divorced from his first wife for five years. They married within a few months. The Czech historian Petr Zídek describes her as a "representative wife" and "party lover", who devoted her time to representing her husband. She supported her husband in hosting political colleagues, diplomatic guests and local nobility, including in Prague, Berlin and Vienna. Austrian writer Leo Heller said of her "how few ministers' wives ... know how to move more pleasantly among the visitors than the blonde Mrs. Heda Tusar, the native Viennese with the friendliness of her lovely Viennese eyes and her straightforward Viennese language." Die Bühne wrote of her in 1925, "the clever, graceful woman was the best attaché and the most skilful representative of the Czechoslovak embassy. She supported her husband's conciliatory attitude with her clever, charming nature." Tusarová was very active in society, and skilled at organising events. In the embassy building in Berlin she had the star violinist Váša Příhoda perform, among others. At the Hotel Adlon she was a co-organizer of charity events. A historian from the Prague National Museum has described how Tusarova and her husband were frequently photographed, even during private holidays, and considers that Tusarova stood out among political wives due to her choice of fashionable, modern clothes and hats that were "uniquely elegant and simple", inspired by Viennese fashions.

However, the marriage between Hedwig and Vlastimil Tusar was questioned by the Vatican. In a letter to Eugenio Pacelli, the later Pope Pius XII, the Vatican Cardinal Secretary of State Pietro Gasparri, citing Clemente Micara, claims that Tusar was merely claiming that Hedwig was his wife.

Vlastimil Tusar died in March 1924 in his wife's arms. According to his will, Hedvika Tusarová became the sole heir, the daughters from Vlastimil's first marriage to Štěpánka Tusarová were only given a statutory share, and Hedvika was granted custody of her step-daughters.

As a widow, she commuted between Vienna, Berlin, Prague and her Hellerhof Castle in the Lower Austrian Paudorf near Krems an der Donau, which she had leased in 1924. On one of her trips to Vienna on 11 May 1924, she reported to Franz Kafka's biographer, Max Brod, how unhappy she was about Vlastimil's death. But in July 1924, four months after Tusar's death, she married Baron Emil Taxis von Bordogna, a former Hussar, flying officer and horse-trainer, eight years younger than she, whom she had met at Karlsbad. A few months after this marriage, they separated, and rumors of divorce began to circulate. After her separation, her name was linked with Dr Gustav Stresemann, the foreign minister of Germany. Before her divorce took place in 1926, an attack on Baron Emil Taxis at Hellerhof Castle at Christmas 1925 made international headlines. Baron Taxis alleged that his attackers were Tusar-Taxis's father and brother, and that he had heard her voice inciting them.

Tusar-Taxis also came under fire from the Nazi press. In 1926, she was accused of having fraudulently obtained a million-dollar inheritance from Tusar - 18 million Czech crowns - and of being the mastermind of the assassination attempt on her second husband. She was accused of having stolen jewels from Konopiště Castle during a trip together with Alice Masaryková, president of the Czechoslovak Red Cross, and of being a Jew. When Vlastimil Tusar's first wife died in 1928, Tusar-Taxis was described as having "attracted unpleasant attention through her affairs", and it was reported that her place of residence was unknown. Her date of death is also unknown.
