= Herbert Masaryk =

Czech painter (1880–1915)

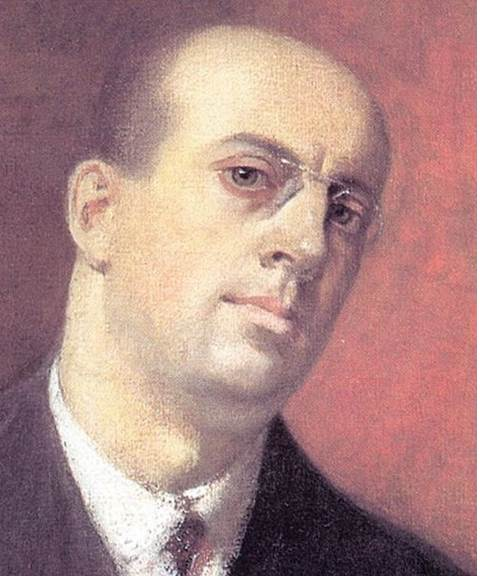
Self-portrait (detail, c. 1912)

Herbert Masaryk (1 May 1880 – 15 March 1915) was a Czech Post-Impressionist painter; son of the future founder and President of Czechoslovakia, Tomáš Masaryk, and his American-born wife, Charlotte Garrigue.

== Biography ==
Masaryk was born in Vienna on 1 May 1880. After displaying an early talent for painting, he studied in Prague, Florence (1900–1901) and Antwerp (1901–1902), but remained largely self-taught. He was influenced by Impressionism, Expressionism, the Vienna Secession and the fairy tale illustrations of Hanuš Schwaiger. His work consists primarily of portraits and landscapes.

He was a good amateur hockey player in his youth, and played for HC Slavia Praha from 1900 to 1901, during its first season. In 2013, a hockey trophy was named for his father, who provided and presented the first national trophy in 1924.

In 1905. he became good friends with the painter Antonín Slavíček and lived with his family in Kameničky. After Slavíček's suicide in 1910, Masaryk married his widow, Bohumila, and adopted his children.

He died in Prague on 15 March 1915 of typhus; apparently contracted while working with Galician war refugees in Borová and Polička. In 1993, a major retrospective was organized by the "Masaryk Democratic Movement". It was opened by President Václav Havel and Masaryk's two surviving daughters and drew over 50,000 attendees.

Of his approximately 300 paintings, almost 100 are unaccounted for. Many of these were probably lost just after his death when his sister, Alice, was arrested by the Austrian government and her property was seized in an effort to discover hidden political writings by their father.

== Selected paintings ==
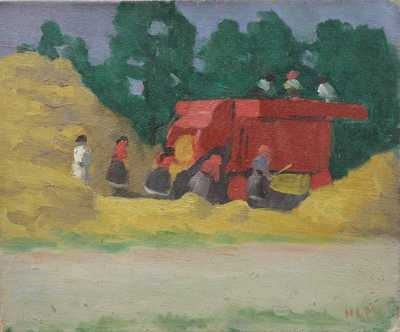
Harvest

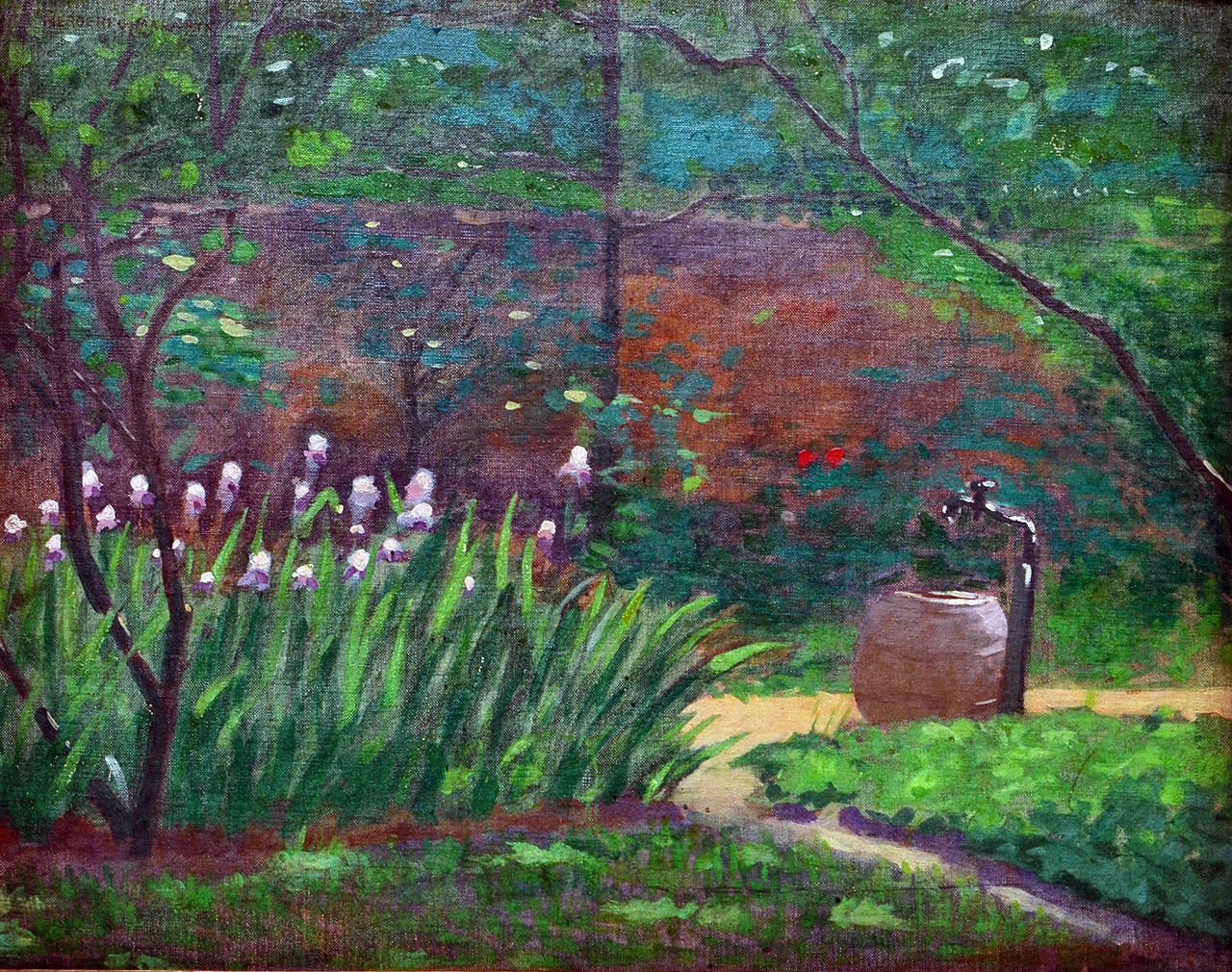
Gardens

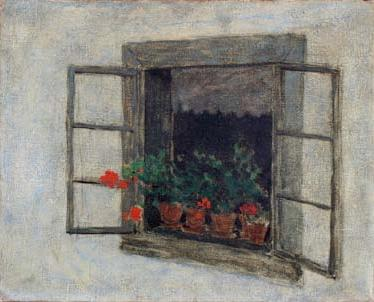
Window with Flowers

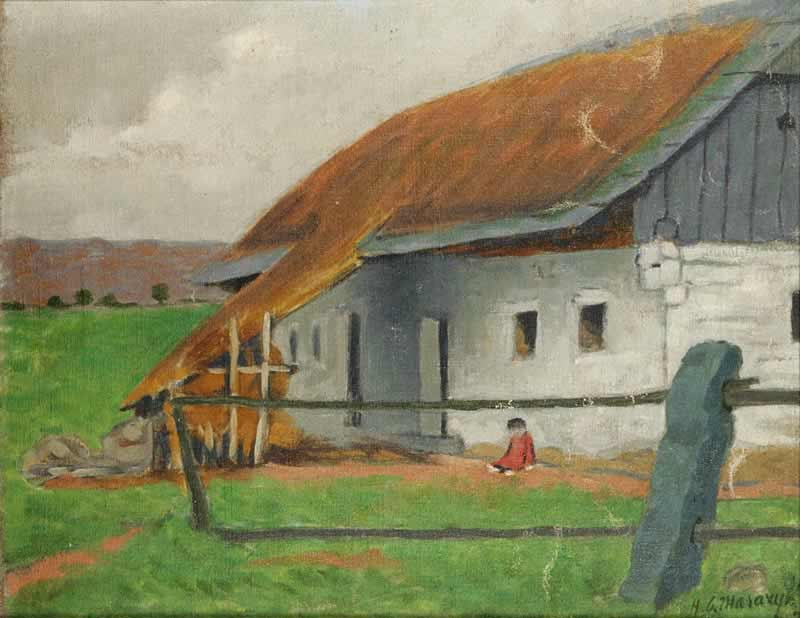
Farmhouse
