= Alice Masaryková =

Czech social worker and politician (1879–1966)

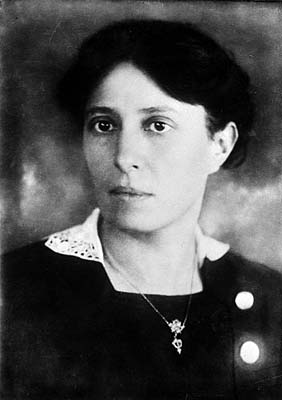
Alice Masaryková (circa 1915, photo by František Drtikol)

Alice Masaryková or Alice Garrigue Masaryk (3 May 1879 – 29 November 1966) was a Czech teacher, sociologist and politician. She is a prominent figure within the field of applied sociology and known to many as the daughter of Tomáš Garrigue Masaryk and the First Lady of Czechoslovakia.

== Family ==
Alice Masaryk was born in Vienna, Austria as the first child to the future founder and first president of Czechoslovakia, Tomáš Garrigue Masaryk and his US American wife Charlotte Garrigue. Her siblings were Herbert Masaryk, Olga Masaryková, Eleanor Masaryková and Jan Masaryk. In her memoirs, Masaryk recalls a "happy and fulfilled childhood...[and] dedicated herself mainly to the study of languages, religion and especially reading."

== Education ==
The family moved to Prague when she was 3 years old, where Masaryk started school in 1886. Her education lasted until 1898 and included advanced secondary education at the first girls' grammar school in Prague, Minerva. This was followed up by university studies at the renowned Charles University in Prague to fulfill her dream of becoming a doctor. Masaryk reports that she took the opportunity very seriously, not least because she was one of few women admitted for medical sciences. However, she left the department after a year for several reasons. She continued her studies in diverse subjects such as History, Sociology and Philosophy at the Charles University and moved to London, Berlin (1901-1902) and Leipzig to "deepen her academic education by studying abroad." She received a Doctorate on 23 June 1903, with a dissertation on "The Magna Charta of Freedom of King John Lackland, 1215".

== Work ==
After she finished her studies, Masaryk was invited to stay at the University of Chicago Social Settlement (UCSS) where she met Julia Lathrop, Mary McDowell and Jane Addams. This encounter and the time spent in the USA "influenced her future professional development...[by] learn[ing] the progressive American methods of social work".

It was my good fortune that I came to Chicago at the time of the historic beginning of modern social work in America. I had the opportunity of meeting there great women who first recognized the need for a healthy Americanization...From my visit to Chicago I brought home with me a firm conviction that there are three things which help social work: spiritual awareness, good education, and dedication to work.

After returning to Czech lands she worked as a teacher in České Budějovice from 1907 to 1910, where she taught geography and history at a secondary educational level. In 1910 she returned to Prague to teach at a new school.

Masaryk was one of the founders of the sociological department at the Charles University in Prague in 1911, which focused on social pathologies including topics like: "reality of poverty, the working and living conditions of the industrial workers of Prague, neglected children and the family, alcoholism, venereal disease, nutrition, and social hygiene." Masaryk's colleague, Anna Berkovcová reports Masaryk's credo:

Every student—future lawyer, medical doctor, theologian, or teacher—should be educated in sociology so that he will better understand the environment in which he will work later.

After being detained in 1915, Alice Masaryk was arrested and was not then allowed to return to her job as a teacher and with the closure of the sociological department she began teaching sociology from her home only until in 1918 she established of the first Czechoslovak Higher School of Social Work in collaboration with her friend Anna Berkovcová. Berkovcová describes the reasoning for the founding of the school as follows:

As the war drew to an end, human problems mounted rapidly throughout Bohemia. Dr. Masaryk was well aware that social-welfare problems had been greatly neglected in giving help, which amounted to the giving of alms. She foresaw the new Republic, for whose birth her father was working, would need a well-organized system of social care...In a democracy good results would be obtained only if the welfare programme was founded on sound social principles. Well-educated and specially trained social workers were of prime importance.

The school was established with the authority of the Bohemian Commission for Child Care and was at the time "the only Bohemian welfare organization recognized by the Austro-Hungarian government." Masaryk and Berkovcová are both recognised as the founders of social education in Czechoslovakia. The objective of the school was shaped by the "sociology developed by Jane Addams and George Herbert Mead at the University of Chicago...and the UCSS."

After the establishment of the Czechoslovak Republic Masaryk was appointed as the head of the Czechoslovak Red Cross organisation on 6 February 1919, and she presided this organisation gratuitously until the German invasion in 1938. This position enabled her to change the Austrian welfare system by establishing policlinics and food kitchens for the poor. In 1929, she appointed structural engineer and architect Marie Schneiderová-Zubaníková as a technical adviser.

Following the German invasion of Czechoslovakia in 1938, Masaryk took up on an invitation to stay at the UCSS. A lecture tour on the social condition of Czechoslovakia, where she replaced her brother, was cancelled after 5 months. Several traumatic incidents led to her hospitalisation from 1940 to 1945. She returned to Czechoslovakia after the end of World War II, only to have to emigrate again when Czech communists took power in 1948. She permanently stayed in the US and continued to be politically active for the Czechoslovak cause.

== Politics ==
Alice Masaryk's involvement in Czechoslovak politics was overshadowed by her father's role in the creation of an independent Czechoslovak state. In 1915 Masaryková was accused of hiding her father's political writings and detained for eight months in a prison in Vienna. Consideration of her execution was only quieted after the USA put pressure on the Austrian government. The interfering was based on a public uproar in the U.S., in which Masaryk was openly supported by prominent personalities like Julia Lathrop, Jane Addams and Mary McDowell. In 1919 Alice Masaryková was one of the first women elected as members of parliament of the Czechoslovak Republic founded on 28 October 1918, and headed by her father Tomáš Garrigue Masaryk as the first president. When her mother died in 1923, Masaryk replaced her as the official representative alongside her father and was essentially the First Lady of the new Republic.

In 1926 Alice Masaryk came under fire from the Nazi press. She was accused of having stolen a sidesaddle from Konopiště Castle during a trip together with Hedwig Tusar-Taxis, widow of Vlastimil Tusar.

In 1928 Masaryková was the president of the First International Conference of Social Work and at a consequent meeting in 1939 clearly outlined her political attitude when "she spoke of the need for each country to pursue 'liberty, equality, and fraternity' as a means of producing a democratic unity of all people... she stressed that a democracy truly concerned about the welfare of all people would be economically stabler and politically more humane." Masaryková was an active supporter of the academic women network, and it is also recorded that Tomáš Masaryk contributed to a monetary fund for the First International Fellowship of the International Federation of University Women (IFUW).

The German occupation forced Masaryková into exile. She continued to be politically active during her stay in the U.S. by dedicating herself to charitable activities. With the German attack on Poland on 1 September 1939 Masaryková "openly joined the campaign for the liberation of Czechoslovakia."

With the end of World War II, Masaryková returned from the USA, only to witness the Communist coup d'état in 1948. When her brother, Jan Garrigue Masaryk, the Foreign Minister of Czechoslovakia was found dead in March 1948, Alice Masaryková emigrated, and she found a permanent refuge in the USA. She carried on her political work and from 1950 to 1954 "frequently spoke on the Radio Free Europe, encouraging those remaining in Czechoslovakia to remain steadfast in their struggle for democracy."

== Death ==
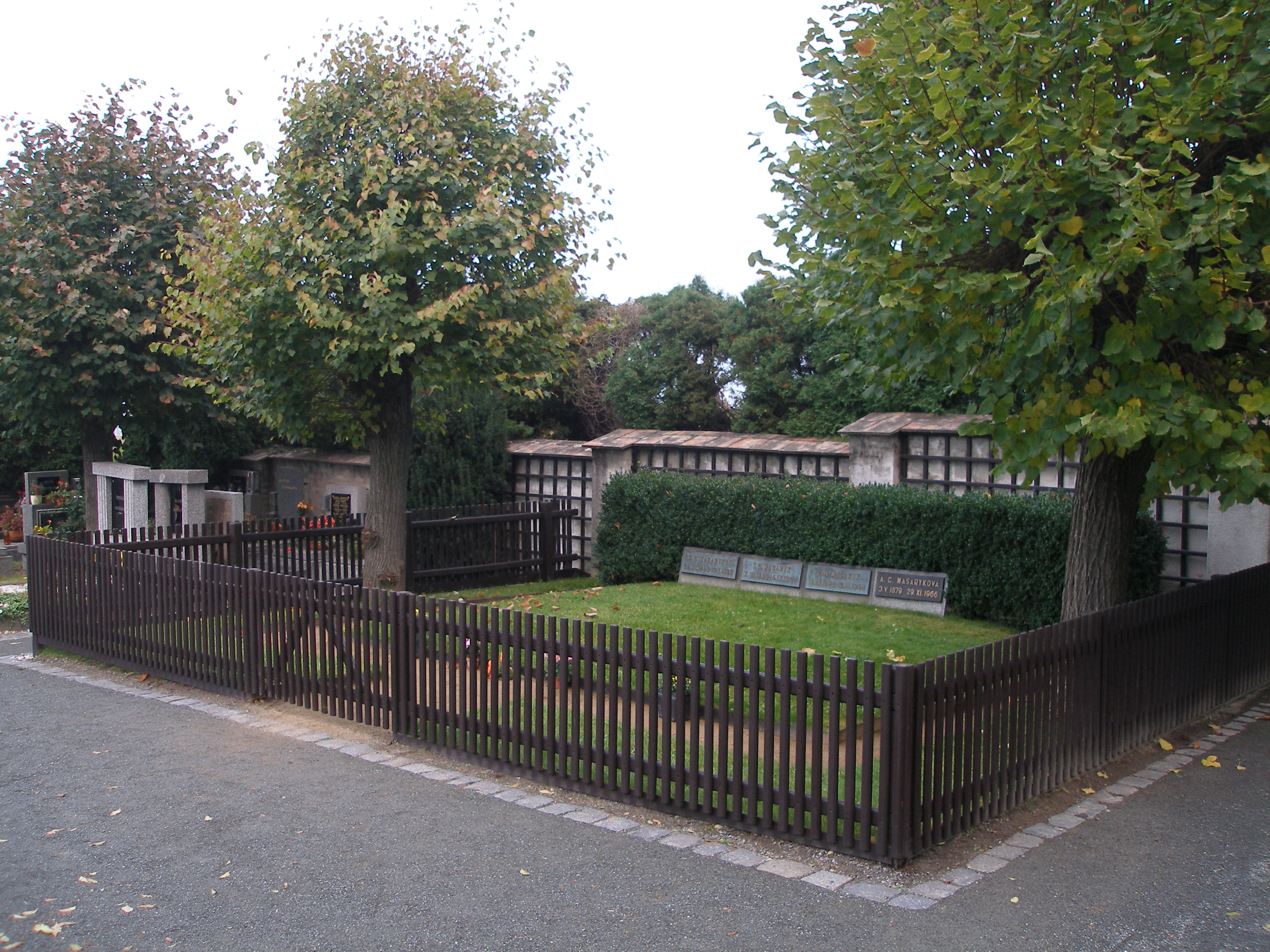
Grave of the Masaryk family in Lány cemetery

Alice Masaryková died on 29 November 1966 in Chicago. In 1994, her ashes were buried next to her parents in a plot at Lány cemetery, where also her brother Jan Masaryk was laid to rest.

== Publications ==
- Alice Masaryk, The Bohemian in Chicago, in: Charities and the Commons (1904), 13, p. 206-210.
- Alice Masaryk, foreword, in Mary E. Hurlbutt (ed.) (1920a) Social Survey of Prague, Vol 3, Prague: Ministry of Welfare, pp. 7–8.
- Alice Masaryk, From an Austrian Prison, in: The Atlantic Monthly (1920b), 126, pp. 577–587.
- Alice Masaryk, The Prison House, in The Atlantic Monthly (1920c), 126, pp. 770–779.
- Alice Masaryk, A Message from Alice Masaryk, in: The Survey (1921a), 46, p. 333.
- Alice Masaryk, The Program of the Czechoslovak Red Cross after 18 months, in: Revue Internationale de la Croix-Rouge (1921b), pp. 736–739.
- Alice Masaryk, Help for Russia, in: Revue Internationale de la Croix-Rouge (1921c), pp. 863–864.
- Alice Masaryk, The Bond Between Us, in Proceedings of the National Conference of Social Work (1939), New York, Columbia University Press, pp. 69–74.

== Bibliography ==
- Alice Garrigue Masaryk, 1879–1966. Her Life as Recorded in Her Own Words and by Her Friends (1980).
- Bruce Keith, Alice Masaryk (1879-1966), in Mary Jo Deegan (ed.), Women in Sociology, New York 1991, p. 298-305.
- Christine von Oertzen, Strategie Verständigung - Zur transnationalen Vernetzung von Akademikerinnen 1917-1955 (to be published in 10/2012).
- H. Gordon Skilling, Mother and Daughter. Charlotte and Alice Masaryk. Prague: Gender Studies, 2001.
