= Charlotte Garrigue =

First Lady of Czechoslovakia (1850–1923)

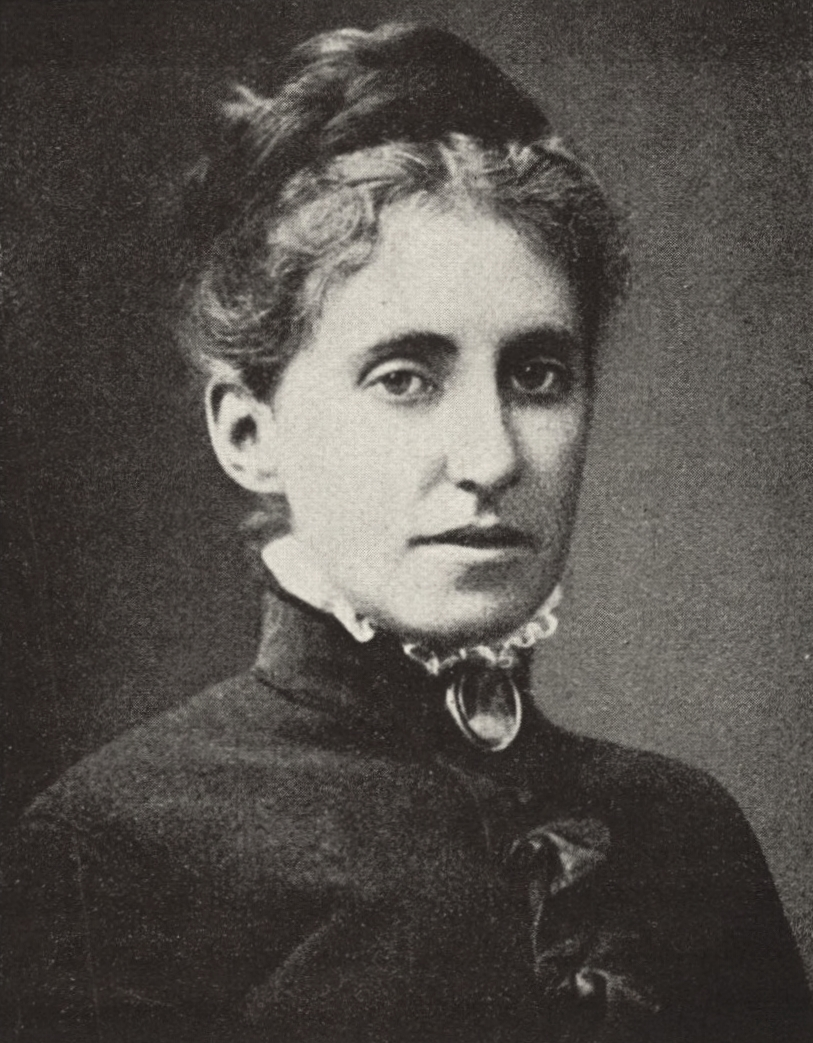

First Lady of Czechoslovakia
- In office 14 November 1918 – 13 May 1923
- Preceded by: Position established
- Succeeded by: Hana Benešová

Personal details
- Born: 20 November 1850 New York, U. S.
- Died: 13 May 1923 (aged 72) Lány, Czechoslovakia
- Party: Czechoslavonic Social Democratic Workers'
- Spouse(s): Tomáš Garrigue Masaryk (1878–1923)
- Children: 5 including Jan Masaryk

Charlotte Garrigue-Masaryk (Czech: Charlotta Garrigue-Masaryková; née Garrigue; 20 November 1850 – 13 May 1923) was the American-born wife of the Czechoslovak philosopher, sociologist, and politician, Tomáš Garrigue Masaryk, the first President of Czechoslovakia.

== Background ==
Garrigue was born in Brooklyn to a Unitarian family with Huguenot ancestry on her father's side and Mayflower passengers on her mother's. She was the niece of Henry Jacques Garrigues and great-granddaughter of Christian Vilhelm Duntzfelt.

== Career ==
In 1877, while visiting a friend studying at a conservatory in Leipzig, Germany, Garrigue first met her future husband, Tomáš Masaryk, who was staying there after having earned his doctorate at the University of Vienna. They married a year later in the United States, after which they settled in Vienna. After the wedding, Masaryk's husband added her surname to his, thus becoming Tomáš Garrigue-Masaryk, as he is remembered in the Czech Republic and Slovakia (often abbreviated TGM). In 1881, the Masaryks moved to Prague, where Tomáš obtained a professorship at the University of Prague.

In the era before the First World War, Mrs. Masaryk became involved in many of the social, humanitarian, and cultural endeavours of Prague society. She joined the Social Democratic Workers' Party; however, she (in agreement with her husband) rejected the Marxist doctrine of the class struggle. For Garrigue, 'the woman question' was part of 'the social question.' Together with Karla Máchová, she organized a lecture series for women on socialism and advocated equality for women.

After the outbreak of the First World War, her husband left for exile with their daughter Olga to seek international support for the independence of the nations of the Austrian-Hungarian monarchy, notably the Czechs and Slovaks. For the majority of the war, Mrs. Masaryk was under police supervision, and her daughter Alice jailed. The situation became even worse when son Herbert died of typhus in 1915. All of these hardships caused her to suffer from depression and cardiac problems.

In December 1918, Tomáš Garrigue Masaryk returned to Prague as the President of Czechoslovakia. The family lived in Prague Castle, often spending time at the chateau of Lány.

== Personal life and death ==
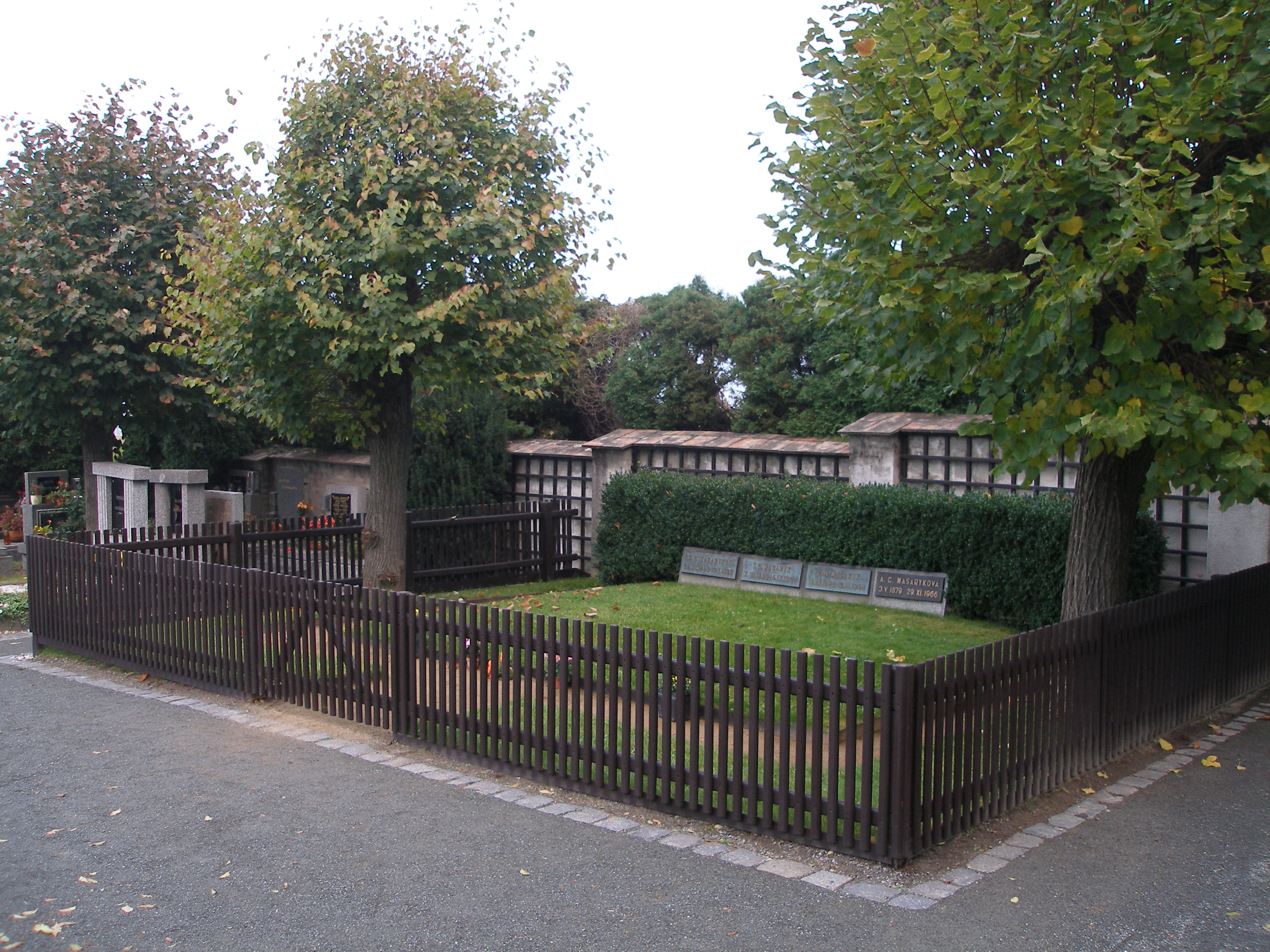
Grave of the Masaryk family in Lány cemetery

Garrigue married Tomáš Garrigue Masaryk, future president of a newly independent Czechoslovakia. Of the couple's five children, four reached adulthood – Alice, Herbert, Olga, and Jan, who later became a noted Czechoslovak diplomat and politician (Foreign Minister).

Mrs. Masaryk died in 1923, her husband in 1937. They are buried in a plot at Lány cemetery, where later also the remains of their children Jan and Alice were interred.
