= 1841 Masaryk =

Carbonaceous main-belt asteroid

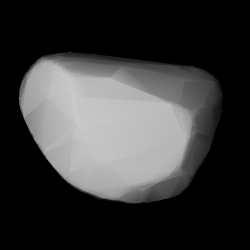
- Shape model of Masaryk from its lightcurve

Discovery
- Discovered by: L. Kohoutek
- Discovery site: Bergedorf Obs.
- Discovery date: 26 October 1971

Designations
- Named after: Tomáš Garrigue Masaryk (Czechoslovak President)
- Alternative designations: 1971 UO_{1} · 1936 FW; 1955 DE · 1959 VJ; 1968 FG · 1970 QN
- Minor planet category: main-belt · (outer)

Orbital characteristics
- Epoch 4 September 2017 (JD 2458000.5)
- Uncertainty parameter 0
- Observation arc: 81.02 yr (29,591 days)
- Aphelion: 3.7629 AU
- Perihelion: 3.0796 AU
- Semi-major axis: 3.4213 AU
- Eccentricity: 0.0999
- Orbital period (sidereal): 6.33 yr (2,311 days)
- Mean anomaly: 313.50°
- Mean motion: 0° 9^{m} 20.52^{s} / day
- Inclination: 2.6203°
- Longitude of ascending node: 45.323°
- Argument of perihelion: 119.95°

Physical characteristics
- Dimensions: 38.642±0.544 km 40.240±0.504; 43.77±0.83 km 46.04 km (derived); 46.07±2.5 km
- Synodic rotation period: 7.53±0.04 h 7.54301±0.00001 h
- Geometric albedo: 0.0364 (derived); 0.0398±0.005; 0.045±0.002; 0.052±0.005; 0.0567±0.0036
- Spectral type: P · CX · C
- Absolute magnitude (H): 10.8 · 10.9 · 10.94±0.19

1841 Masaryk (prov. designation: 1971 UO_{1}) is a carbonaceous background asteroid from the outer region of the asteroid belt, approximately 46 kilometers in diameter. It was discovered on 26 October 1971, by Czech astronomer Luboš Kohoutek at Bergedorf Observatory in Hamburg, Germany. The asteroid was named after the first President of Czechoslovakia, Tomáš Garrigue Masaryk.

== Orbit and classification ==
Masaryk orbits the Sun in the outer main-belt at a distance of 3.1–3.8 AU once every 6 years and 4 months (2,311 days). Its orbit has an eccentricity of 0.10 and an inclination of 3° with respect to the ecliptic. First identified as 1936 FW at Uccle Observatory, Masaryk's first used observation was taken at Goethe Link Observatory in 1955, extending the body's observation arc by 16 years prior to its official discovery observation.

== Naming ==
This minor planet was named in honor of the first president of the independent Czechoslovak Republic, Tomáš Garrigue Masaryk (1850–1937), statesman, philosopher and known for his humanistic ideas. The official naming citation was published by the Minor Planet Center on 20 December 1974 (M.P.C. 3757).

== Physical characteristics ==
The carbonaceous asteroid is characterized as a (darker) P-type and as a transitional CX-type by NEOWISE and PanSTARRS, respectively.

=== Rotation period ===
In April 2006, a rotational lightcurve of Masaryk'was obtained from photometric observations made by French amateur astronomer Pierre Antonini. It gave a rotation period of 7.53 hours with a brightness variation of 0.52 magnitude (U=2+). The result agrees with a lightcurve published in March 2016, using sparse-in-time photometry data from the Lowell Photometric Database (U=n.a.).

=== Diameter and albedo ===
According to the surveys carried out by the Infrared Astronomical Satellite IRAS, the Japanese Akari satellite, and NASA's Wide-field Infrared Survey Explorer with its subsequent NEOWISE mission, Masaryk measures between 38.6 and 46.1 kilometers in diameter, and its surface has an albedo between 0.039 and 0.057. The Collaborative Asteroid Lightcurve Link derives an albedo of 0.036 and a diameter of 46.0 kilometers with an absolute magnitude of 10.9.
