= Tomáš Masaryk =

Founding father of Czechoslovakia (1850–1937)

Tomáš Garrigue Masaryk
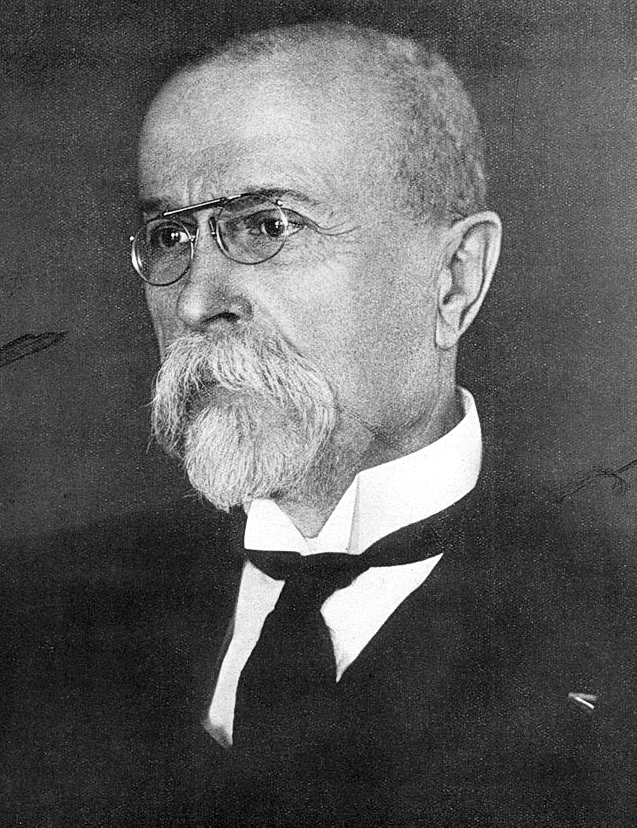
- Masaryk in 1925

President of Czechoslovakia
- In office 14 November 1918 – 14 December 1935
- Prime Minister: Karel Kramář; Vlastimil Tusar; Jan Černý; Edvard Beneš; Antonín Švehla; František Udržal; Jan Malypetr; Milan Hodža
- Preceded by: Office established
- Succeeded by: Edvard Beneš

Member of the House of Deputies
- In office 17 June 1907 – 25 September 1917
- Constituency: Moravia
- In office 9 April 1891 – 25 September 1893
- Constituency: Bohemia

Personal details
- Born: 7 March 1850 Hodonín, Moravia, Austrian Empire
- Died: 14 September 1937 (aged 87) Lány, Czechoslovakia
- Party: Young Czech (1890–1893); Czech Progressive Party (1900–1918); Independent (from 1918)
- Spouse: Charlotte Garrigue (m. 1878; died 1923)
- Children: 5, including Alice, Herbert, Jan and Olga
- Education: University of Vienna (PhD, 1876; Dr. habil., 1879); University of Leipzig
- Profession: Philosopher

Tomáš Garrigue Masaryk (Note: Born Tomáš Masaryk /ˈmæsərɪk/; Czech: [ˈtomaːʃ ˈɡarɪk ˈmasarɪk]) (7 March 1850 – 14 September 1937) was a Czechoslovak statesman, political activist and philosopher who served as the first president of Czechoslovakia from 1918 to 1935. He is regarded as the founding father of Czechoslovakia.

Born in Hodonín, Moravia (then part of the Austrian Empire), Masaryk obtained a doctorate at the University of Vienna and was a professor of philosophy at the Czech Charles-Ferdinand University in Prague. He began his political career as a deputy of the Austrian Reichsrat, serving from 1891 to 1893 and from 1907 to 1914. He was an advocate of restructuring the Austro-Hungarian Empire into a federal state, but by the outbreak of the First World War, he had become a supporter of Czech and Slovak independence. He went into exile, and travelled around Europe to organise and promote the Czechoslovak cause. He played a pivotal role in the establishment of the Czechoslovak Legion, which fought against the Central Powers during the war. In 1918, Masaryk, along with his protégés Edvard Beneš and Milan Rastislav Štefánik, travelled to the United States to obtain support from President Woodrow Wilson and Secretary of State Robert Lansing. Their negotiations resulted in the Washington Declaration, which proclaimed the independence of a Czechoslovak state.

With the fall of Austria-Hungary in late 1918, the First Czechoslovak Republic received recognition from the Allied powers and Masaryk was recognised as head of its provisional government. He was formally elected president in November, and was reelected three times subsequently. Masaryk presided over a period of stability as Czechoslovakia emerged as a strong democratic state. He resigned from office in 1935 due to old age, and was succeeded by Beneš. He retired to the village of Lány and died two years later at the age of 87.

== Early life ==
Masaryk was born to a poor, working-class family in the predominantly Catholic city of Hodonín, Margraviate of Moravia, in Moravian Slovakia (in the present-day Czech Republic, then part of the Austrian Empire). The nearby Slovak village of Kopčany, the home of his father Jozef, also claims to be his birthplace. Masaryk grew up in the village of Čejkovice, in South Moravia, before moving to Brno to study.

His father, Jozef Masárik, was Slovak, born in Kopčany, Slovakia. Masárik was a carter and, later, the steward and coachman at the imperial estate in the nearby town of Hodonín. Tomáš's mother, Teresie Masaryková (née Kropáčková), was a Moravian who received a German education. A cook at the estate, she met Masárik and they married on 15 August 1849.

== Education ==
After grammar school in Brno and Vienna from 1865 to 1872, Masaryk attended the University of Vienna and was a student of Franz Brentano. He received his Ph.D. with a thesis on Plato (Das Wesen der Seele bei Plato. Eine kritische Studie vom empirischen Standpunkt, The Essence of the Soul in Plato: A Critical Study from the Empirical Standpoint) under Brentano from that university in 1876, and later completed his habilitation there in 1879 with a thesis titled Der Selbstmord als soziale Massenerscheinung der modernen Civilisation (Suicide as a Social Mass Phenomenon of Modern Civilization). From 1876 to 1877, Masaryk studied at the University of Leipzig with Wilhelm Wundt and became acquainted with Edmund Husserl. He married Charlotte Garrigue, whom he had met while a student in Leipzig, on 15 March 1878. They lived in Vienna until 1881, when they moved to Prague.

Masaryk was appointed professor of philosophy at the Czech Charles-Ferdinand University, the Czech-language part of Charles University, in 1882. He founded Athenaeum, a magazine devoted to Czech culture and science, the following year. Athenaeum, edited by Jan Otto, was first published on 15 October 1883.

Masaryk's students included Edvard Beneš.

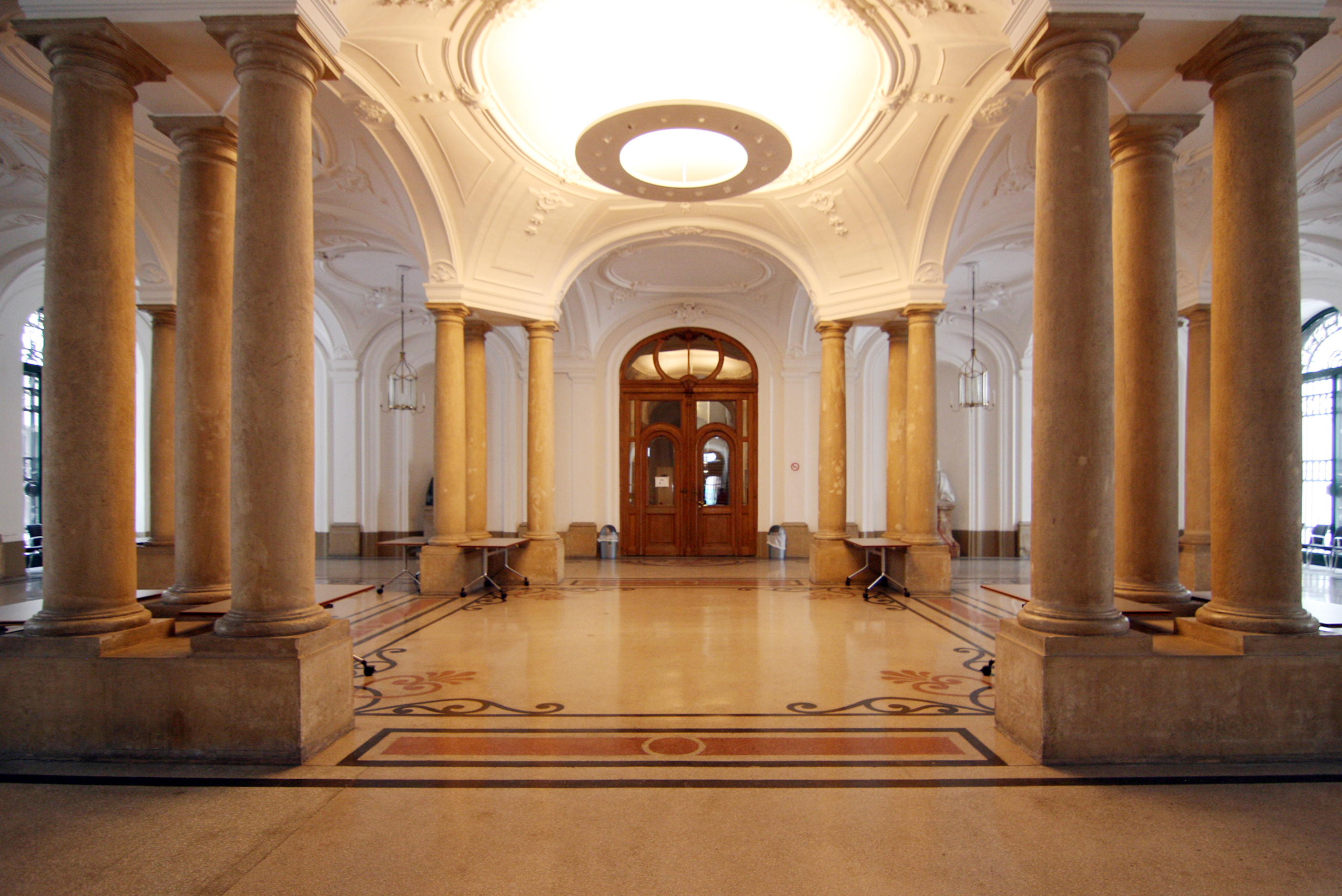
Portico of the University of Vienna's New Aula, where Masaryk studied philosophy.

Masaryk challenged the validity of the epic poems Rukopisy královedvorský a zelenohorský, supposedly dating to the early Middle Ages and presenting a false, nationalistic Czech chauvinism to which he was strongly opposed. He also contested the Jewish blood libel during the 1899 Hilsner trial.

Masaryk was greatly influenced by the 19th-century respect for scientific evidence. The 19th century was an age of tremendous scientific and technological advances, and as such scientists enjoyed immense prestige. Masaryk believed that social problems and political conflicts were the results of ignorance, and that provided that one undertook a proper "scientific" approach to studying the underlying causes it would be possible to devise the correct solutions. As such, Masaryk saw his role as an educator who would enlighten the public from its ignorance and apathy.

== Politician ==
Masaryk served in the Reichsrat from 1891 to 1893 with the Young Czech Party and from 1907 to 1914 in the Czech Progressive Party, which he had founded in 1900. At that time, he was not yet campaigning for Czech and Slovak independence from Austria-Hungary. Masaryk helped Hinko Hinković defend the Croat-Serb Coalition during their 1909 Vienna political trial; its members were sentenced to a total of over 150 years in prison, with a number of death sentences.

When World War I broke out in 1914, Masaryk concluded that the best course was to seek independence for Czechs and Slovaks from Austria-Hungary. He went into exile in December 1914 with his daughter, Olga, staying in several places in Western Europe, the Russian Empire, the United States and Japan. Masaryk began organizing Czechs and Slovaks outside Austria-Hungary during his exile, establishing contacts which would be crucial to Czechoslovak independence. He delivered lectures and wrote several articles and memoranda supporting the Czechoslovak cause. Masaryk was pivotal in establishing the Czechoslovak Legion in Russia as an effective fighting force on the Allied side during World War I, when he held a Serbian passport. In 1915 he was one of the first staff members of the School of Slavonic and East European Studies (now part of University College London), where the student society and senior common room are named after him. Masaryk became professor of Slavic Research at King's College London, lecturing on the problem of small nations. In January 1917, supported by Norman Hapgood, T. G. Masaryk wrote the first memorandum to president Wilson, concerning the need for the creation of an independent Czechoslovak state.

During World War I and afterwards, Masaryk supported the unification of the Kingdom of Serbia with the Kingdom of Montenegro.

Masaryk championed feminist causes, being influenced by his wife Charlotte Garrigue. Masaryk's progressive ideas strongly influenced the Washington Declaration of Czechoslovak Independence.

== Czechoslovak Legion and US visit ==
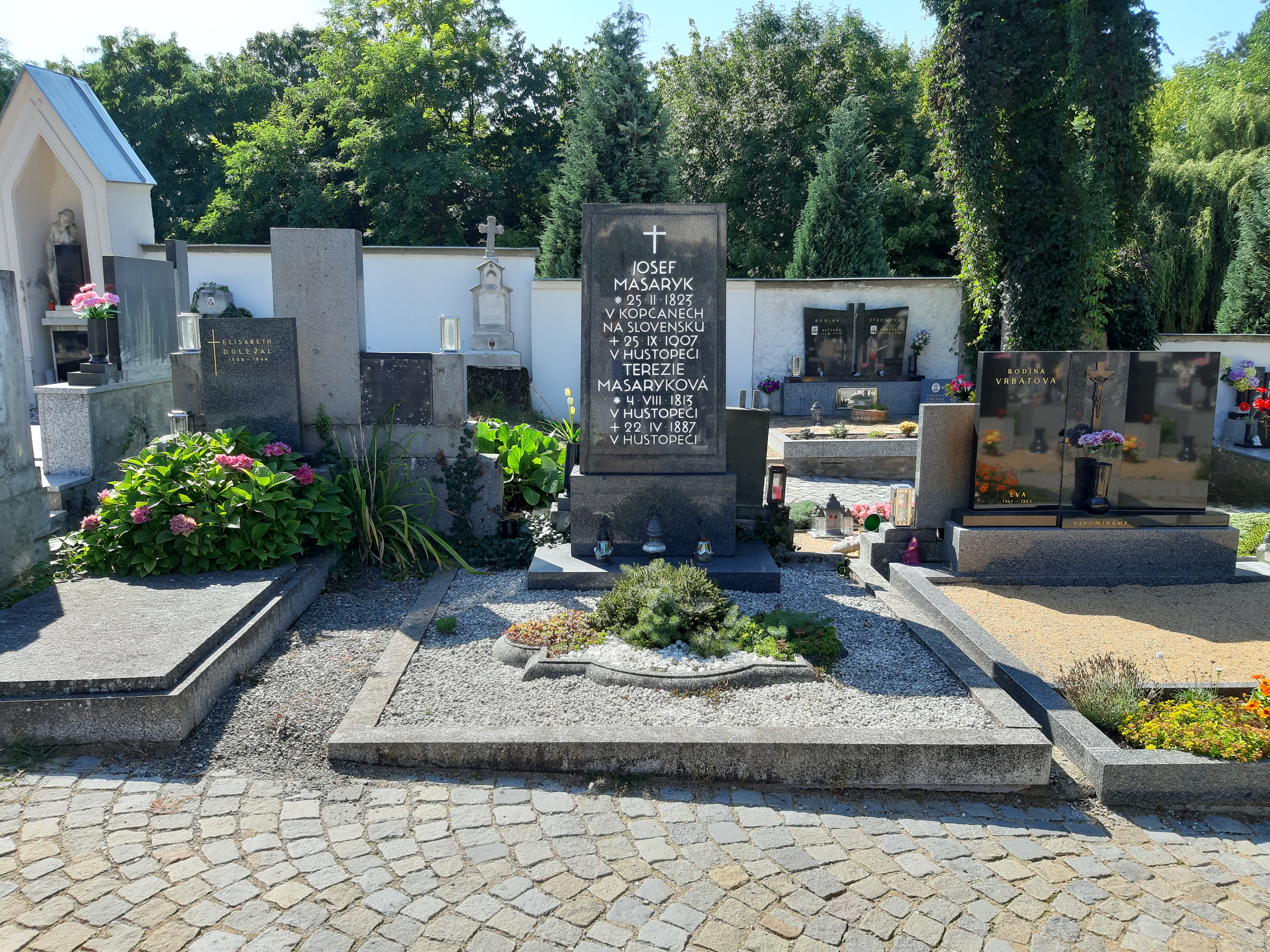
Hustopeče: Grave of Masaryk's parents

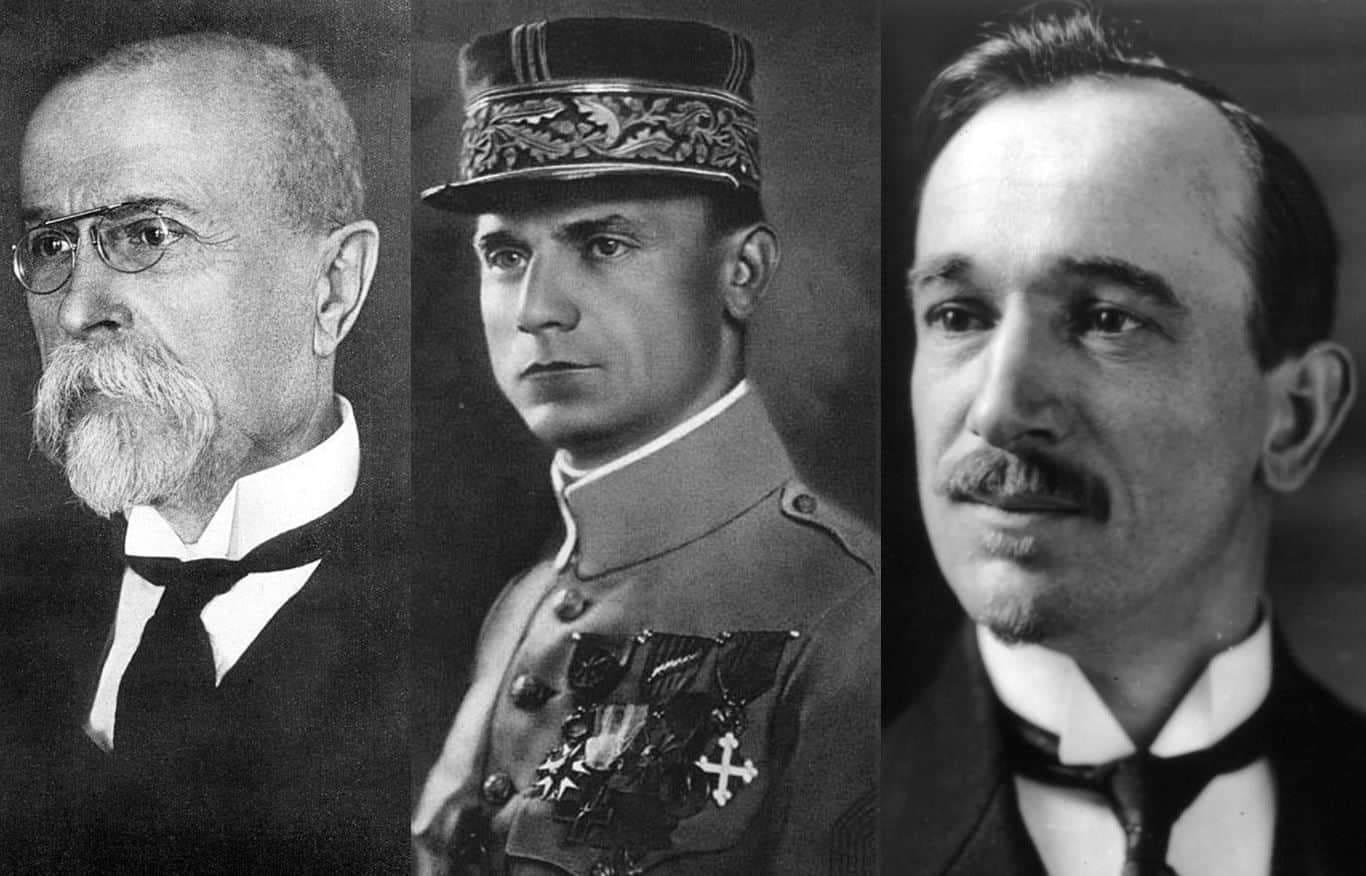
Triumvirate of Tomáš Garrigue Masaryk, Milan Rastislav Štefánik, and Edvard Beneš.

On 5 August 1914, the Russian High Command authorized the formation of a battalion recruited from Czechs and Slovaks in Russia. The unit went to the front in October 1914 and was attached to the Russian Third Army.

From its start, Masaryk wanted to develop the legion from a battalion to a formidable military formation. To do so, however, he realized that he would need to recruit Czech and Slovak prisoners of war (POWs) in Russian camps. In late 1914, Russian military authorities permitted the legion to enlist Czech and Slovak POWs from the Austro-Hungarian army; the order was rescinded in a few weeks, however, because of opposition from other areas of the Russian government. Despite continuing efforts to persuade the Russian authorities to change their minds, the Czechs and Slovaks were officially barred from recruiting POWs until the summer of 1917. Under these conditions, the Czechoslovak armed unit in Russia grew slowly from 1914 to 1917. Masaryk preferred to concentrate on elites rather than public opinion. On 19 October 1915, Masaryk gave the inaugural address at the newly opened School of Slavonic Studies at King's College London on "The Problem of Small Nations in the European Crisis", arguing that on both moral and practical grounds that the United Kingdom should support the independence efforts of "small" nations such as the Czechs. Shortly afterwards, Masaryk crossed the English Channel to go to Paris, where he delivered a speech in French at the Institut d'études slaves of the Sorbonne on "Les Slaves parmi les nations" ("The Slavs Among the Nations"), receiving what was described as a "vigorous applause".

During the war, Masaryk's intelligence network of Czech revolutionaries provided critical intelligence to the allies. His European network worked with an American counterespionage network of nearly 80 members, headed by Emanuel Viktor Voska (including G. W. Williams). Voska and his network, who (as Habsburg subjects) were presumed to be German supporters, spied on German and Austrian diplomats. Among other achievements, the intelligence from these networks was critical in uncovering the Hindu–German Conspiracy in San Francisco. Masaryk began teaching at London University in October 1915. He published "Racial Problems in Hungary", with ideas about Czechoslovak independence. In 1916, Masaryk went to France to convince the French government of the necessity of dismantling Austria-Hungary. He consulted with his friend professor Pavel Miliukov, a leading Russian historian and one of the leaders of the Kadet Party, to introduce him to various members of Russian high society.

In early 1916, the Czechs and Slovaks in Russian service were reorganized as the First Czecho-Slovak Rifle Regiment. In a rare attempt to influence public opinion, Masaryk opened up an office on Piccadilly Circus in London whose exterior was covered with pro-Czechoslovak slogans and maps with the intention of attracting the interest of those walking by. One of Masaryk's most important British friends was the journalist Wickham Steed who wrote articles in the newspapers urging British support for Czechoslovakia. Another important British contract for Masaryk was the historian Robert Seton-Watson, who also wrote widely in the British press urging British support for the "submerged" nations of the Austrian empire. After the 1917 February Revolution he proceeded to Russia to help organize the Czechoslovak Legion, a group dedicated to Slavic resistance to the Austrians. Miliukov became the new Russian foreign minister in the Provisional government, and proved very sympathetic towards the idea of creating Czechoslovakia. After the Czechoslovak troops' performance in July 1917 at the Battle of Zborov (when they overran Austrian trenches), the Russian provisional government granted Masaryk and the Czechoslovak National Council permission to recruit and mobilize Czech and Slovak volunteers from the POW camps. Later that summer, a fourth regiment was added to the brigade, which was renamed the First Division of the Czechoslovak Corps in Russia (Československý sbor na Rusi, also known as the Czechoslovak Legion – Československá legie). A second division of four regiments was added to the legion in October 1917, raising its strength to about 40,000 by 1918.

Masaryk formed a good connection with Russian supreme commanders, Mikhail Alekseyev, Aleksei Brusilov, Nikolay Dukhonin and Mikhail Diterikhs, in Mogilev, from May 1917.

Masaryk travelled to the United States in 1918, where he convinced President Woodrow Wilson of the righteousness of his cause. On 5 May 1918, over 150,000 Chicagoans filled the streets to welcome him; Chicago was the centre of Czechoslovak immigration to the United States, and the city's reception echoed his earlier visits to the city and his visiting professorship at the University of Chicago in 1902 (Masaryk had lectured at the university in 1902 and 1907). He also had strong links to the United States, with his marriage to an American citizen and his friendship with Chicago industrialist Charles R. Crane, who had Masaryk invited to the University of Chicago and introduced to the highest political circles, including Wilson. Besides Wilson and the secretary of the state Robert Lansing this was Ray Stannard Baker, W. Phillips, Polk, Long, Lane, D. F. Houston, William Wiseman, Harry Pratt Judson and the French ambassador Jean Jules Jusserand. It also included Bernard Baruch, Vance McCormick, Edward N. Hurley, Samuel M. Vauclain and Colonel House. At the Chicago meeting on 8 October 1918, Chicago industrialist Samuel Insull introduced him as the president of the future Czechoslovak Republic de facto and mentioned his legions. On 18 October 1918 he submitted to president Wilson the "Washington Declaration" (Czechoslovak declaration of independence) created with the help of his American friends (Louis Brandeis, Ira Bennett, Gutzon Borglum, Franklin K. Lane, Edward House, Herbert Adolphus Miller, Charles W. Nichols, Robert M. Calfee, Frank E. J. Warrick, George W. Stearn and Czech Jaroslav Císař) as the basic document for the foundation of a new independent Czechoslovak state. Speaking on 26 October 1918 as head of the Mid-European Union in Philadelphia, Masaryk called for the independence of Czechoslovaks and the other oppressed peoples of central Europe.

Masaryk's book Světová revoluce was paradigmatic of central European thought as he identified the Western powers as the "bearers of higher humanitarian principles and democracy" without regard to non-European peoples enduring colonialism or segregation in the United States. Czech historian Pavel Barša writes that "he implicitly identified humanity with the peoples of European stock".

Masaryk believed that Jews controlled the press and helped the nascent state of Czechoslovakia during its struggle for independence. Czech historian Jan Láníček comments that "The great philosopher and humanist Masaryk was still using the same anti-Semitic trope found at the bottom of all anti-Jewish accusations."

== Leader of Czechoslovakia ==
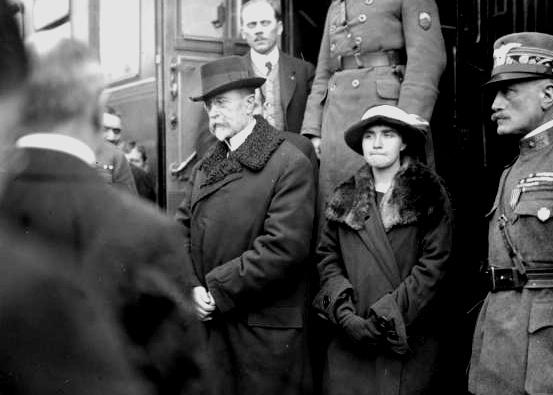
Masaryk and his daughter, Olga, returning from exile on 21 December 1918

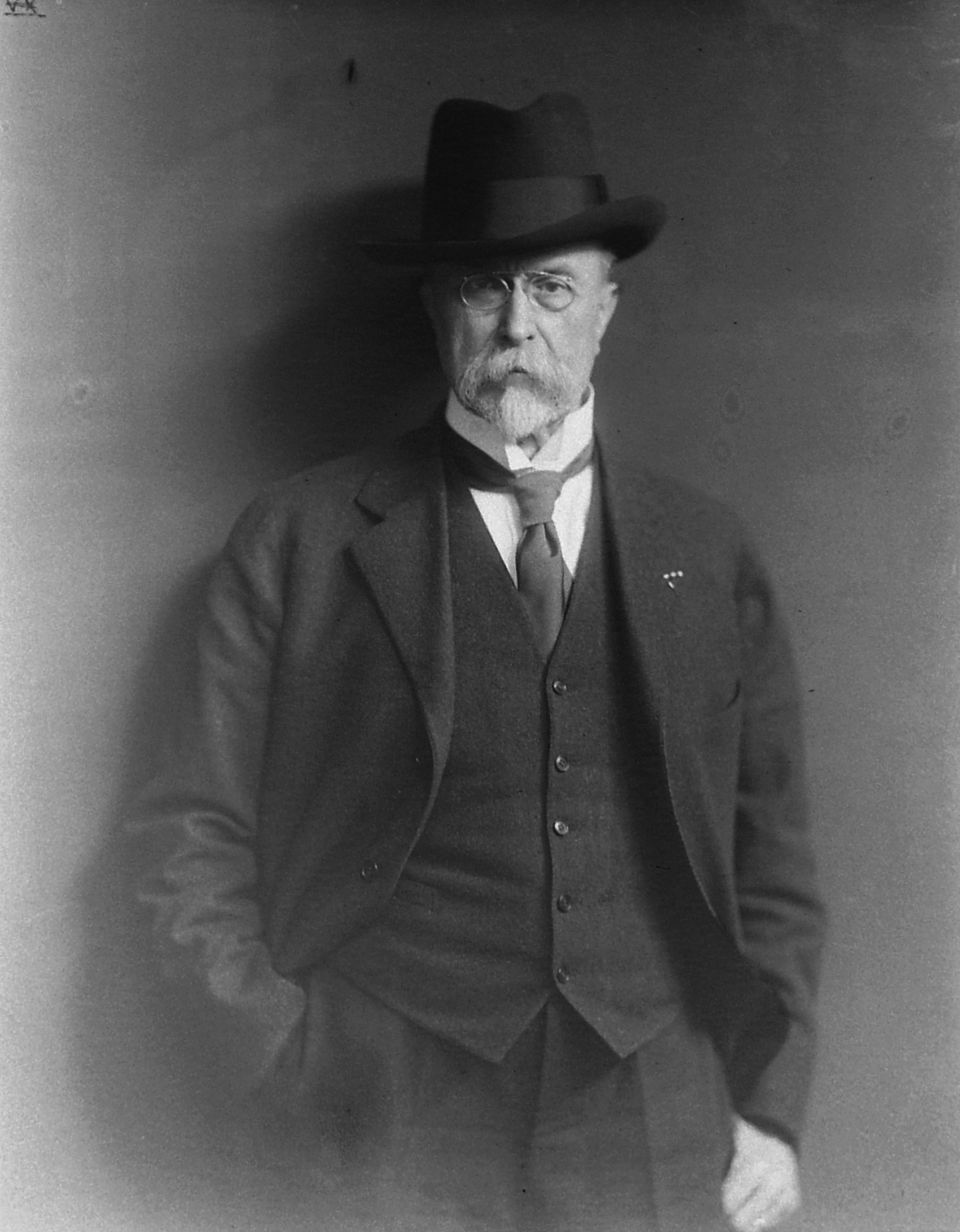
Portrait of Tomáš Garrigue Masaryk, 1919.

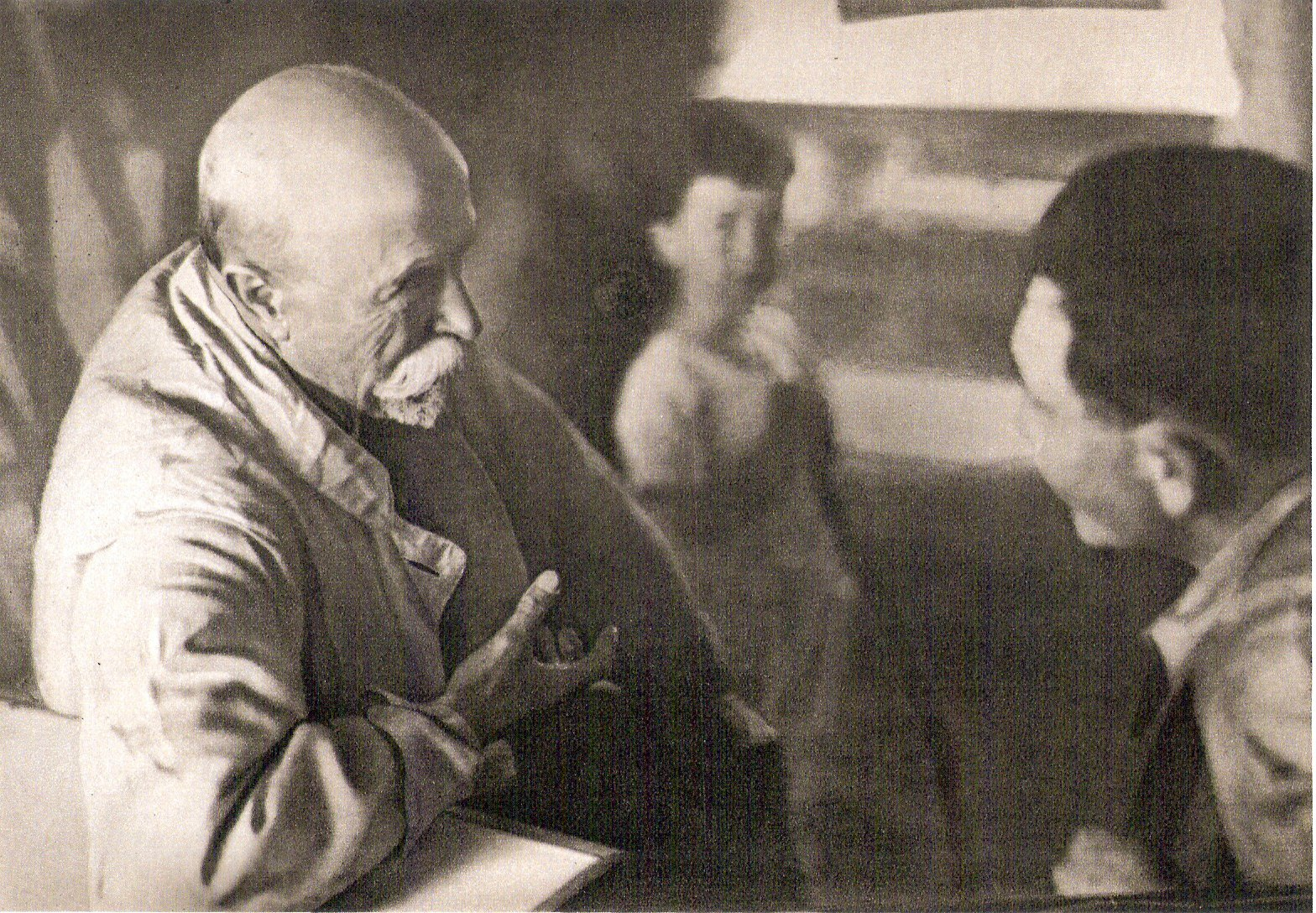
Visiting kibbutz Beit Alfa, Mandatory Palestine, 1924

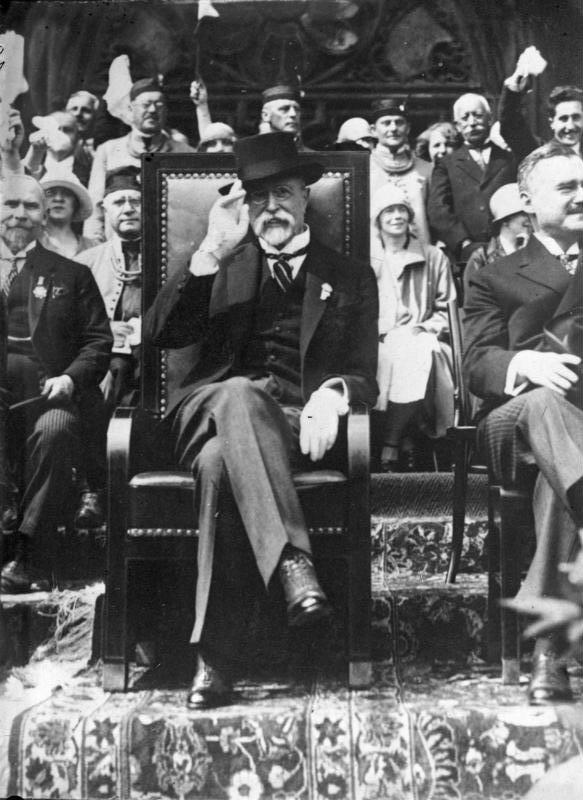
Masaryk at Prague Old Town Square in 1932

With the fall of the Austro-Hungarian Empire in 1918, the Allies recognized Masaryk as head of the provisional Czechoslovak government. On 14 November of that year, he was elected president of Czechoslovakia by the National Assembly in Prague while he was in New York. On 22 December, Masaryk publicly denounced the Germans in Czechoslovakia as settlers and colonists.

Masaryk was re-elected three times: in May 1920, 1927, and 1934. Normally, a president was limited to two consecutive terms by the 1920 constitution, but a one-time provision allowed the first president–Masaryk–to run for an unlimited number of terms.

On paper, Masaryk had a somewhat limited role; the framers of the constitution intended to create a parliamentary system in which the prime minister and cabinet held actual power. However, a complex system of proportional representation made it all but impossible for one party to win a majority. Usually, ten or more parties received the 2.6 per cent of votes needed for seats in the National Assembly. With so many parties represented, no party even approached the 151 seats needed for a majority; indeed, no party ever won more than 25 per cent of the vote. These factors resulted in frequent changes of government; Masaryk's tenure saw ten cabinets headed by nine statesmen. Under the circumstances, Masaryk's presence gave Czechoslovakia a large measure of stability. This stability, combined with his domestic and international prestige, gave Masaryk's presidency more power and influence than the framers of the constitution intended.

He used his authority in Czechoslovakia to create the Hrad (the Castle), an extensive, informal political network. Under Masaryk's watch, Czechoslovakia became the strongest democracy in Central Europe. Masaryk's status as a Protestant leading a mainly Catholic nation led to criticism, as did his promotion of the 15th-century proto-Protestant Jan Hus as a symbol of Czech nationalism.

There were founded "The Masaryk Academy of Labour", for the scientific study of scientific management too, with the Masaryk's supporting in Prague in 1918 and Masaryk University in Brno.

Masaryk visited France, Belgium, England, Egypt and the Mandate for Palestine in 1923 and 1927. With Herbert Hoover, he sponsored the first Prague International Management Congress, a July 1924 gathering of 120 global labour experts (of which 60 were from the United States), organized with Masaryk Academy of Labour. After the rise of Adolf Hitler, Masaryk was one of the first political figures in Europe to voice concern.

Masaryk resigned from office on 14 December 1935, because of old age and poor health, and was succeeded by Edvard Beneš.

== Death and legacy ==
Masaryk died less than two years after leaving office, at the age of 87, in Lány on 14 September 1937. He was buried next to his wife in a plot at Lány cemetery, where later the remains of his children Jan Masaryk and Alice Masaryková were laid to rest.

Masaryk did not live to see the Munich Agreement or the Nazi occupation of his country, and was known as the Grand (Great) Old Man of Europe.

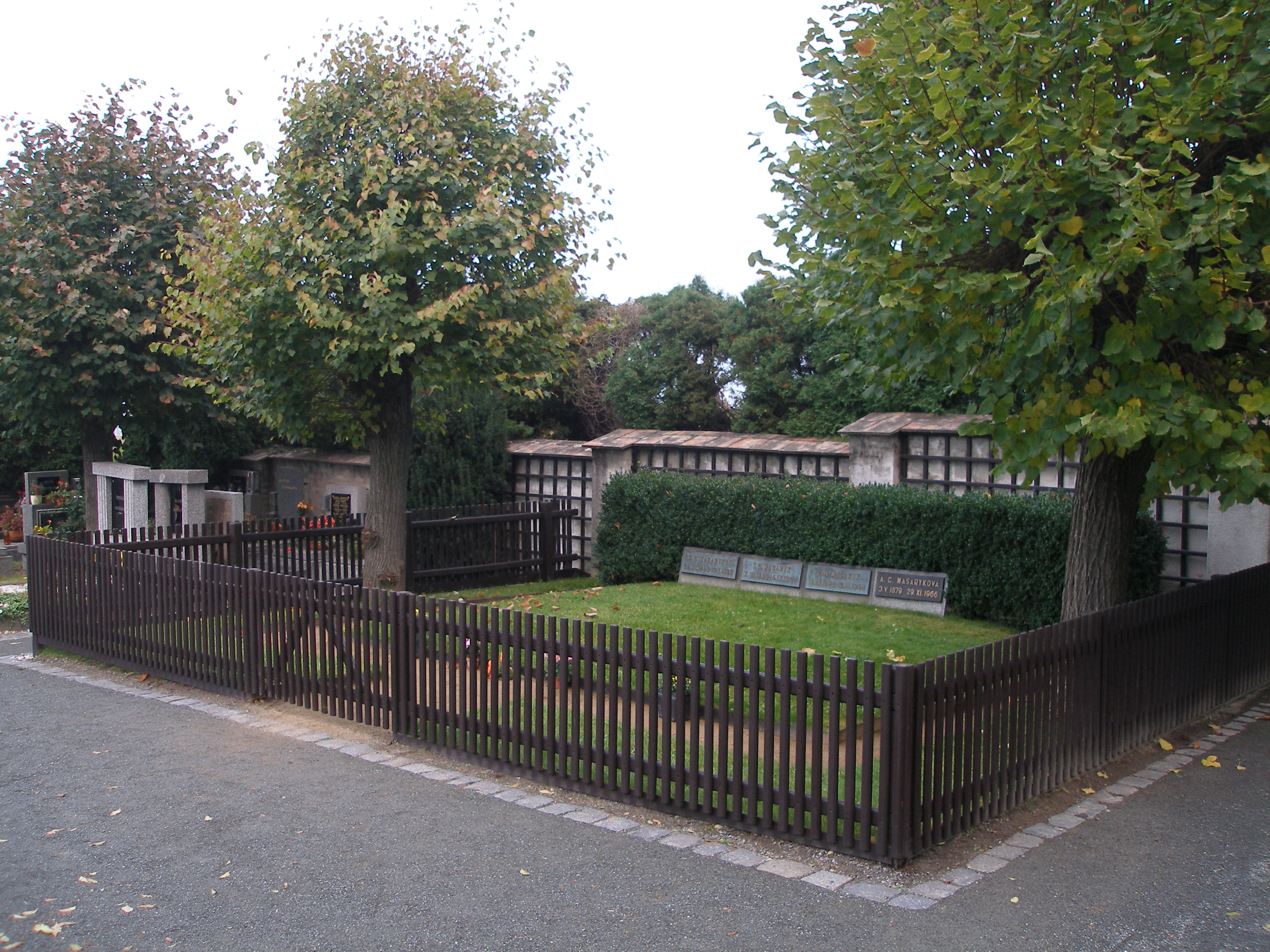
Grave of Tomáš Garrigue Masaryk and his family in Lány cemetery

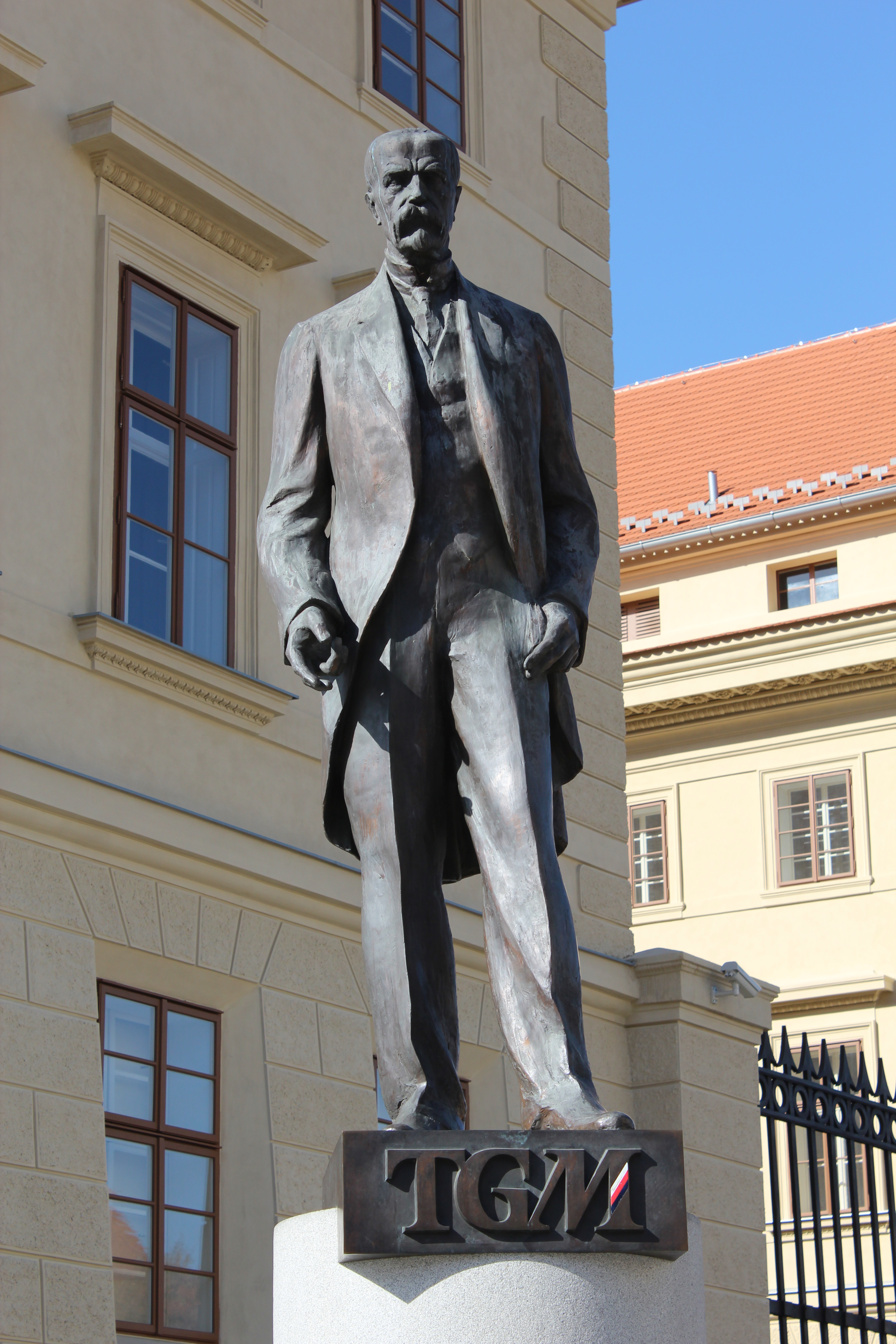
Statue of Masaryk in Prague

=== Intellectual legacy ===
Masaryk's unique combination of intellectual and political authority has made him a figure of interest to sociology and philosophy, especially within Czechoslovakia, where his significance has been analysed in depth by philosophers such as Jan Patočka (1991 monograph), Milan Machovec (1968 monograph) and others.

=== Commemorations ===
As the founding father of Czechoslovakia, Masaryk remains revered by Czechs and Slovaks.

Masaryk University in Brno, founded in 1919 as Czechoslovakia's second university, was named after him when it was founded; after 30 years as Univerzita Jana Evangelisty Purkyně v Brně, it was renamed for Masaryk in 1990.

Commemorations of Masaryk have been held annually in the Lány cemetery on his birthday and day of death (7 March and 14 September) since 1989.

The Czechoslovak, now Czech Order of Tomáš Garrigue Masaryk, established in 1990, is an honour awarded to individuals who have made outstanding contributions to humanity, democracy and human rights.

He is commemorated by a number of statues, busts, plaques, coins and postage stamps. Although most are in or of the Czech Republic and Slovakia, Masaryk has a statue on Embassy Row in Washington, D.C., and in the Midway Plaisance park in Chicago and is memorialized in San Francisco's Golden Gate Park rose garden. A plaque with a portrait of Masaryk is on the wall of a hotel in Rakhiv, Ukraine, where he reportedly resided from 1917 to 1918, and a bust was erected in 2002 on Zakhysnykiv Ukrainy Square (former Druzhby Narodiv Square) in Uzhhorod, Ukraine.

Avenida Presidente Masaryk (President Masaryk Avenue) is a main thoroughfare in the exclusive Polanco neighbourhood of Mexico City. In 1999 the city of Prague donated a statue of Masaryk to Mexico City, one of the two originals made when the statue for the Prague Castle was being prepared for the 150th anniversary of his birth.

The community of Masaryktown, Florida, founded by Slovaks and Czechs, is named after him.

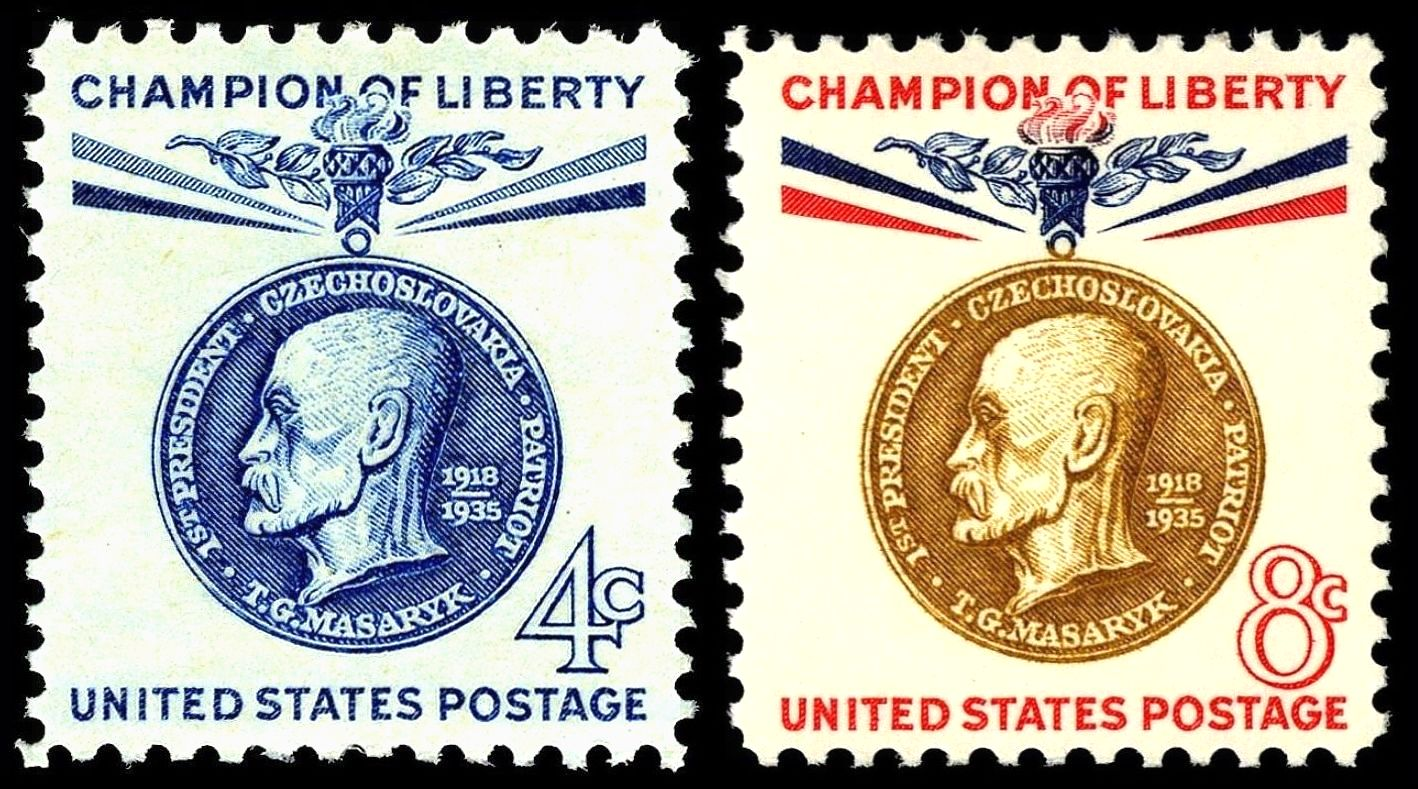
In 1960 the U.S. government issued two postage stamps in honor of Tomáš Masaryk – part of the Champion of Liberty postage issues

In Israel, Masaryk is considered an important figure and a national friend. A village was named after him – Kibbutz Kfar Masaryk near Haifa, which was largely founded by Jewish immigrants from Czechoslovakia. One of the main squares in Tel Aviv is Masaryk Square (he had visited the city in 1927). In Haifa, one of the junctions in the city was named after him as well. Many cities in Israel named streets after his name, including Jerusalem, Petach Tikva, Netanya, Nahariya and others. A Masaryk forest was planted in the Western Galilee.

Streets in Zagreb, Belgrade, Dubrovnik, Daruvar, Varaždin, Novi Sad, Smederevo, Zenica and Split are named Masarykova ulica, and a main thoroughfare in Ljubljana is named after Masaryk. Streets named Thomas Masaryk can be found in Geneva and Bucharest.

Asteroid 1841 Masaryk, discovered by Luboš Kohoutek, is named after him.

Masaryk is pictured in Faith No More’s Album of the Year album cover.

== Honours and awards ==
He received awards and decorations before and after World War I.

=== National honours ===
- Austria-Hungary: Jubilee Military Medal (1898)
- Austria-Hungary: Military Jubilee Cross (1908)
- Czechoslovakia: Czechoslovak War Cross 1918 (1919)
- Czechoslovakia: Czechoslovak Revolutionary Medal (1919)
- Czechoslovakia: Order of the Falcon (1919)
- Czechoslovakia: Czechoslovak Victory Medal (1922)

=== Foreign honours ===
- Kingdom of Yugoslavia: Order of Karađorđe's Star (1920)
- France: Légion d'honneur (1921)
- Kingdom of Italy: Order of Saints Maurice and Lazarus (1921)
- Tunisia: Order of Glory (1923)
- United Kingdom: Order of St Michael and St George (1923)
- Belgium: Order of Leopold (1923)
- Spain: Order of Charles III (1924)
- Denmark: Order of the Elephant (1925)
- Poland: Order of the White Eagle (1925)
- Austria: Decoration of Honour for Services to the Republic of Austria (1926)
- Kingdom of Romania: Order of Carol I (1927)
- Kingdom of Romania: Commemorative Cross of the 1916–1918 War (1927)
- Greece: Order of the Redeemer (1927)
- Latvia: Order of the Three Stars, 1st Class with Collar (17 Nov 1928)
- Empire of Japan: Order of the Chrysanthemum (1928)
- Kingdom of Egypt: Order of Muhammad Ali (1928)
- Netherlands: Order of the Netherlands Lion (1929)
- Holy See: Order of the Holy Sepulchre (1929)
- Lithuania: Order of the Cross of Vytis (1930)
- Finland: Order of the White Rose of Finland (1930)
- Portugal: Military Order of Saint James of the Sword (1930)
- Estonia: Order of the Cross of the Eagle (1931)
- Spanish Republic: Order of the Spanish Republic (1935)
- Siam: Order of the White Elephant (1935)
- Colombia: Order of Boyacá (1937)

== Philosophy ==
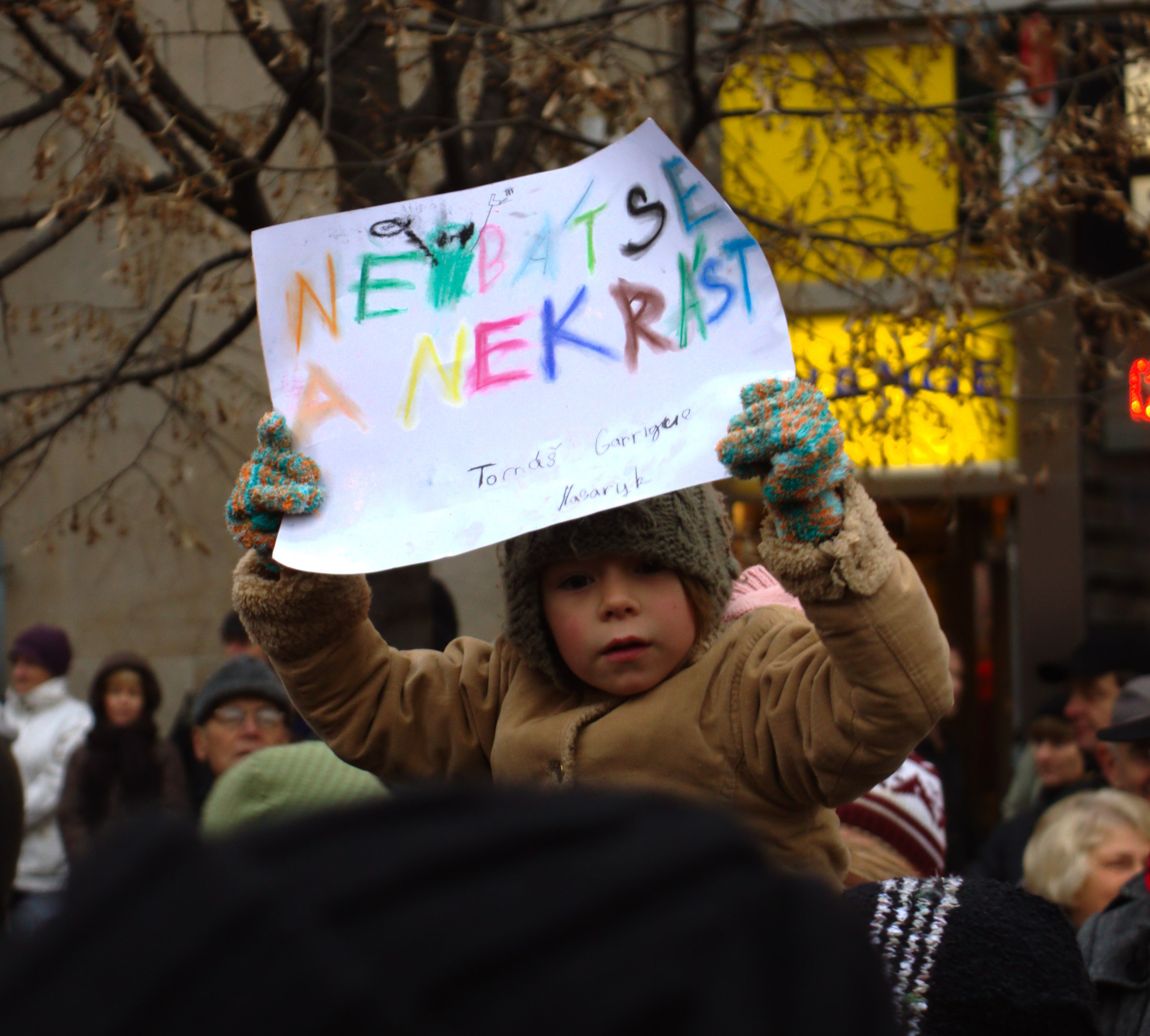
Motto "Fear not, and steal not" at a demonstration in Prague, 2011

Masaryk's motto was "Fear not, and steal not" (Czech: Nebát se a nekrást). A philosopher and an outspoken rationalist and humanist, he emphasised practical ethics reflecting the influence of Anglo-Saxon philosophers, French philosophy and—in particular—the work of 18th-century German philosopher Johann Gottfried Herder, who is considered the founder of nationalism. Masaryk was critical of German idealism and Marxism.

== Personal life ==
Masaryk married Charlotte Garrigue in 1878, and took her family name as his middle name. They met in Leipzig, Germany, and became engaged in 1877. Garrigue was born in Brooklyn to a Protestant family with French Huguenots among their ancestors. She became fluent in Czech and published articles in a Czech magazine. Hardships during the World War I took their toll, and she died in 1923. Their son, Jan, was a Czechoslovak ambassador in London, foreign minister in the Czechoslovak government-in-exile (1940–1945) and in the governments from 1945 to 1948. They had four other children: Herbert, Alice, Eleanor and Olga.

Born and raised a Catholic, Masaryk later became a Protestant; first joining the Reformed Church in Austria and later the Evangelical Church of Czech Brethren in 1918 upon Czechoslovak independence, but he was mostly non-practising and rarely attended religious services. His conversion was influenced by the 1870 declaration of papal infallibility and by his wife Charlotte, who was raised as a Unitarian.

== Family tree ==
	Tomáš Masaryk		Charlotte Garrigue
Alice	Herbert	Jan	Eleanor	Olga

== Books ==
He wrote several books in Czech, including The Czech Question (1895), The Problems of Small Nations in the European Crisis (1915), The New Europe (1917), and The World Revolution (Svĕtová revoluce; 1925) translated into English as The Making of a State (1927). Karel Čapek wrote a series of articles, Hovory s T.G.M. ("Conversations with T.G.M."), which were later collected as Masaryk's autobiography.

- (1885) Základové konkretné logiky (Foundations of Concrete logic). Prague. (German: Versuch einer concreten Logik), Vienna, 1887).
- (1898) Otázka sociální (The Social Question). Prague. (German: Die philosophischen und sociologischen Grundlagen des Marxismus), Vienna, 1899).
- (1913) Russland und Europa (Russia and Europe). Jena, Germany. (The Spirit of Russia, tr. Eden and Cedar Paul, London, 1919).
- (1918) The New Europe, London.
- (1919) The Spirit of Russia: Studies in History, Literature and Philosophy, tr. Eden and Cedar Paul, 2 vols. (London: Allen & Unwin, 1919) Vol. 1, Vol. 2.
- (1922) The Slavs After the War, London.
- (1925) Světová revoluce (World revolution). Prague. (The Making of a State, tr. H. W. Steed, London, 1927; Making of a State, tr. Howard Fertig, 1970.)

== See also ==
- 1841 Masaryk, an asteroid
- School of Brentano, a group of philosophers and psychologists who studied with Franz Brentano

== Sources and further reading ==
- Bose, A. C. (1971). Indian Revolutionaries Abroad, 1905–1927. Patna: Bharati Bhawan. ISBN 81-7211-123-1.
- Čapek, Karel. (1931–35). Hovory s T. G. Masarykem [Conversations with T. G. Masaryk]. Prague. (English translations: President Masaryk Tells His Story, tr. M. and R. Weatherall, London, 1934; and Masaryk on Thought and Life, London, 1938)
- Masaryk, T. (1970). Making of a State. Howard Fertig. ISBN 0-685-09575-4.
- Orzoff, Andrea (2009). Battle for the Castle: The Myth of Czechoslovakia in Europe, 1914–1948. New York: Oxford University Press. ISBN 978-0-19-536781-2.
- Popplewell, Richard J (1995). Intelligence and Imperial Defence: British Intelligence and the Defence of the Indian Empire 1904–1924. Routledge. ISBN 978-0-7146-4580-3. Archived from the original on 26 March 2009.
- Preclík, Vratislav (2019). Masaryk a legie (in Czech). Paris Karviná in association with the Masaryk Democratic Movement, Prague. p. 219. ISBN 978-80-87173-47-3.
- Seton-Watson, R. W. (1943). Masaryk in England. Cambridge: Cambridge University Press.
- Voska, E.V; Irwin, W (1940). Spy and Counterspy. New York. Doubleday, Doran & Co.
- Walzel, Vladimir S.; Polak, Frantisek; Solar, Jiri (1960). T. G. Masaryk – Champion of Liberty. Research and Studies Center of CFTUF, New York.
- Wein, Martin. A History of Czechs and Jews: A Slavic Jerusalem. London: Routledge, 2015, 40–65 specifically on T. G. Masaryk and Jews
- Wiskemann, Elizabeth. "Masaryk and Czechoslovakia," History Today (Dec 1968), Vol. 18 Issue 12, pp 844–851 online

Political offices
Office established	President of Czechoslovakia; 1918–1935	Succeeded by Edvard Beneš
