= Edvard Beneš =

Czechoslovak politician (1884–1948)

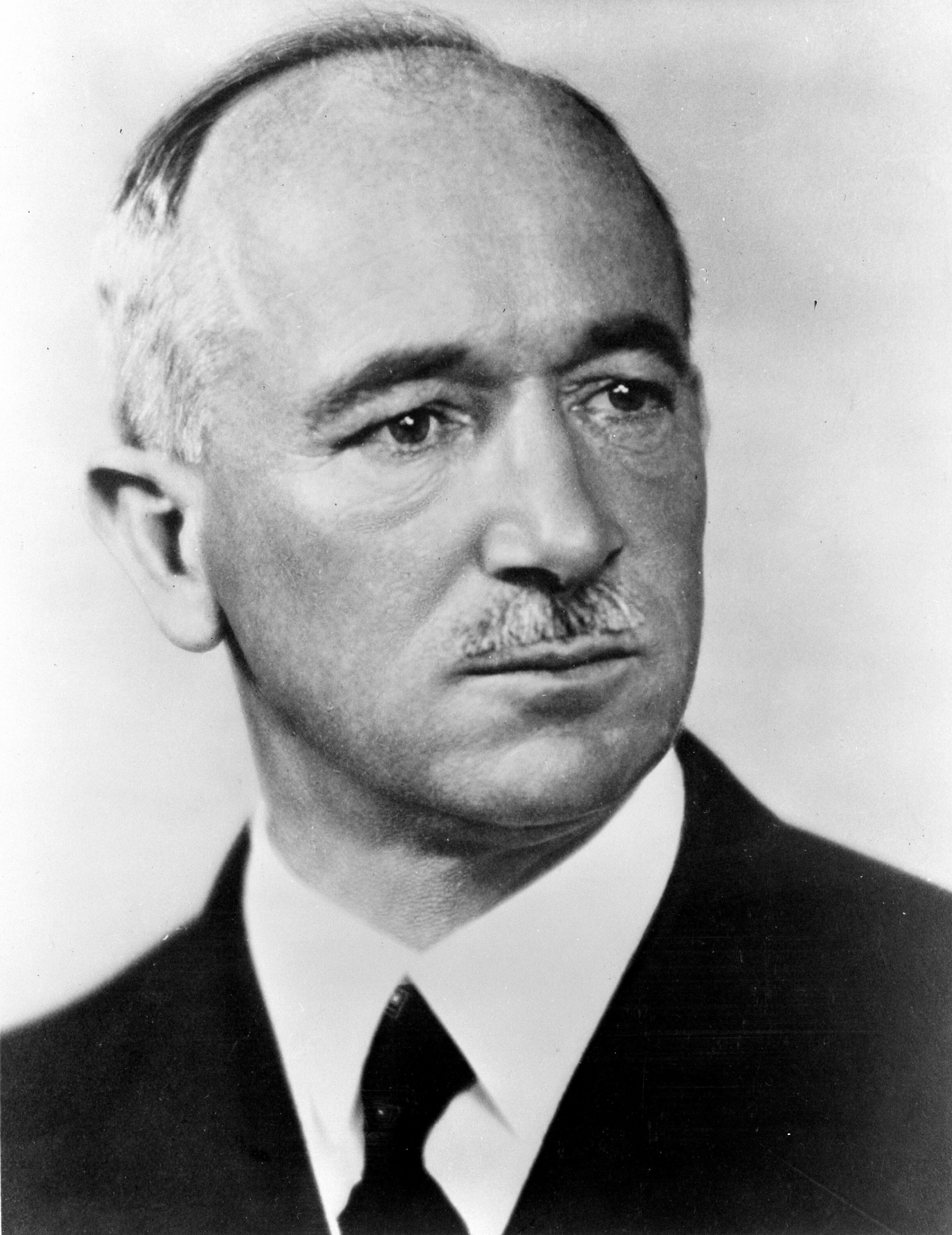
- Beneš c. 1942

President of Czechoslovakia
- In office 2 April 1945 – 7 June 1948
- Prime Minister: Zdeněk Fierlinger; Klement Gottwald
- Preceded by: Himself as president in exile
- Succeeded by: Klement Gottwald
- In exile 17 October 1939 – 2 April 1945
- Prime Minister: Jan Šrámek
- In office 18 December 1935 – 5 October 1938
- Prime Minister: Milan Hodža; Jan Syrový
- Preceded by: Tomáš Masaryk
- Succeeded by: Emil Hácha

4th Prime Minister of Czechoslovakia
- In office 26 September 1921 – 7 October 1922
- President: Tomáš Masaryk
- Preceded by: Jan Černý
- Succeeded by: Antonín Švehla

Minister of Foreign Affairs
- In office 14 November 1918 – 18 December 1935
- Prime Minister: Karel Kramář; Vlastimil Tusar; Jan Černý; Himself; Antonín Švehla; František Udržal; Jan Malypetr; Milan Hodža
- Preceded by: Position established
- Succeeded by: Milan Hodža

Personal details
- Born: 28 May 1884 Kožlany, Bohemia, Austria-Hungary
- Died: 3 September 1948 (aged 64) Sezimovo Ústí, Czechoslovakia
- Party: Czech Realist Party (1908–1915; associated non-member); Czech National Social Party (1923–1935)
- Spouse: Hana Benešová (m. 1909)
- Education: Charles University in Prague; University of Paris; Paris Institute of Political Studies

Edvard Beneš (Czech: [ˈɛdvard ˈbɛnɛʃ]; 28 May 1884 – 3 September 1948) was a Czech politician and statesman who served as the president of Czechoslovakia from 1935 to 1938, and again from 1939 to 1948. During the first six years of his second stint, he led the Czechoslovak government-in-exile during World War II.

As president, Beneš faced two major crises, which both resulted in his resignation. His first resignation came after the Munich Agreement and subsequent German occupation of Czechoslovakia in 1938, which resulted in his government's exile in the United Kingdom. The second came about with the 1948 Communist coup, which created a Communist regime in Czechoslovakia. Before his time as president, Beneš was also the first foreign affairs minister (1918–1935) and the fourth prime minister (1921–1922) of Czechoslovakia. The de facto leader of the Czech National Social Party, he was known as a skilled diplomat.

== Early life ==
=== Birth and family ===
Beneš was born into a peasant family in 1884 in the town of Kožlany, Bohemia, Austria-Hungary (Now Kožlany, Czech Republic). He was the youngest son and tenth child overall of Matěj Beneš (1843–1910) and Anna Petronila (née Beneš; 1840–1909). One of his siblings was the future Czechoslovak politician Vojta Beneš. His nephew through his brother Václav was Bohuš Beneš, a diplomat and author. Bohuš was the father of Emilie Beneš Brzezinski, an American sculptor, and Václav E. Beneš, a Czech-American mathematician.

=== Education and marriage ===
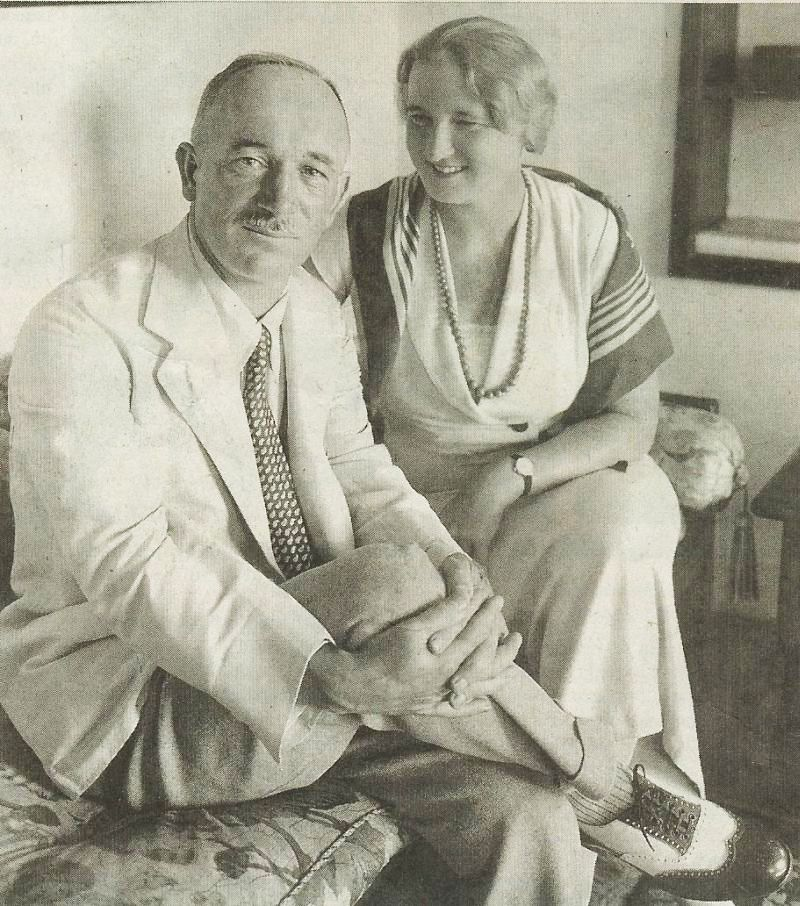
Edvard Beneš with his wife Hana in 1934

Beneš spent much of his youth in the Vinohrady district of Prague, where he attended a grammar school from 1896 to 1904. His landlord's family was acquainted with his future wife Anna Vlčková (1885–1974, later Hana Benešová). The two would study French, history, and literature together at the Sorbonne. Edvard and Anna got engaged in May 1906, and married in November 1909. Some time after their engagement, Anna changed her name to Hana. Edvard had always preferred to call her Hana because he had just ended a relationship with another woman named Anna. Around the same time, Edvard Beneš also changed his name, going from the original spelling "Eduard" to "Edvard".

He played football as an amateur for Slavia Prague. After studying philosophy at Charles-Ferdinand University in Prague, Beneš left for Paris and continued his studies at the Sorbonne and at the Independent School of Political and Social Studies. He completed his first degree in Dijon, where he received his doctorate of law in 1908. Beneš then taught for three years at a business college, and after his 1912 habilitation in philosophy, Beneš became a lecturer of sociology at Charles University. He was also involved in scouting.

In 1907, Beneš published over 200 articles in the Czech social democratic newspaper Právo lidu containing his impressions of life in Western Europe. Beneš wrote that he found Germany to be repulsive and an "empire of force and power" after visiting Berlin. In London, he wrote that "the situation here is terrible and so is life". During World War II, when Beneš was living in exile in London, the German Propaganda Ministry gleefully republished his articles from 1907 expressing mostly negative sentiments about life in Britain. However, Beneš loved Paris, the "city of light". He wrote that he found it to be "almost miraculously ... a magnificent synthesis of modern civilization, of which France is the bearer". For the rest of his life, Beneš was a passionate Francophile and always stated that Paris was his favorite city.

== Political career before independence ==
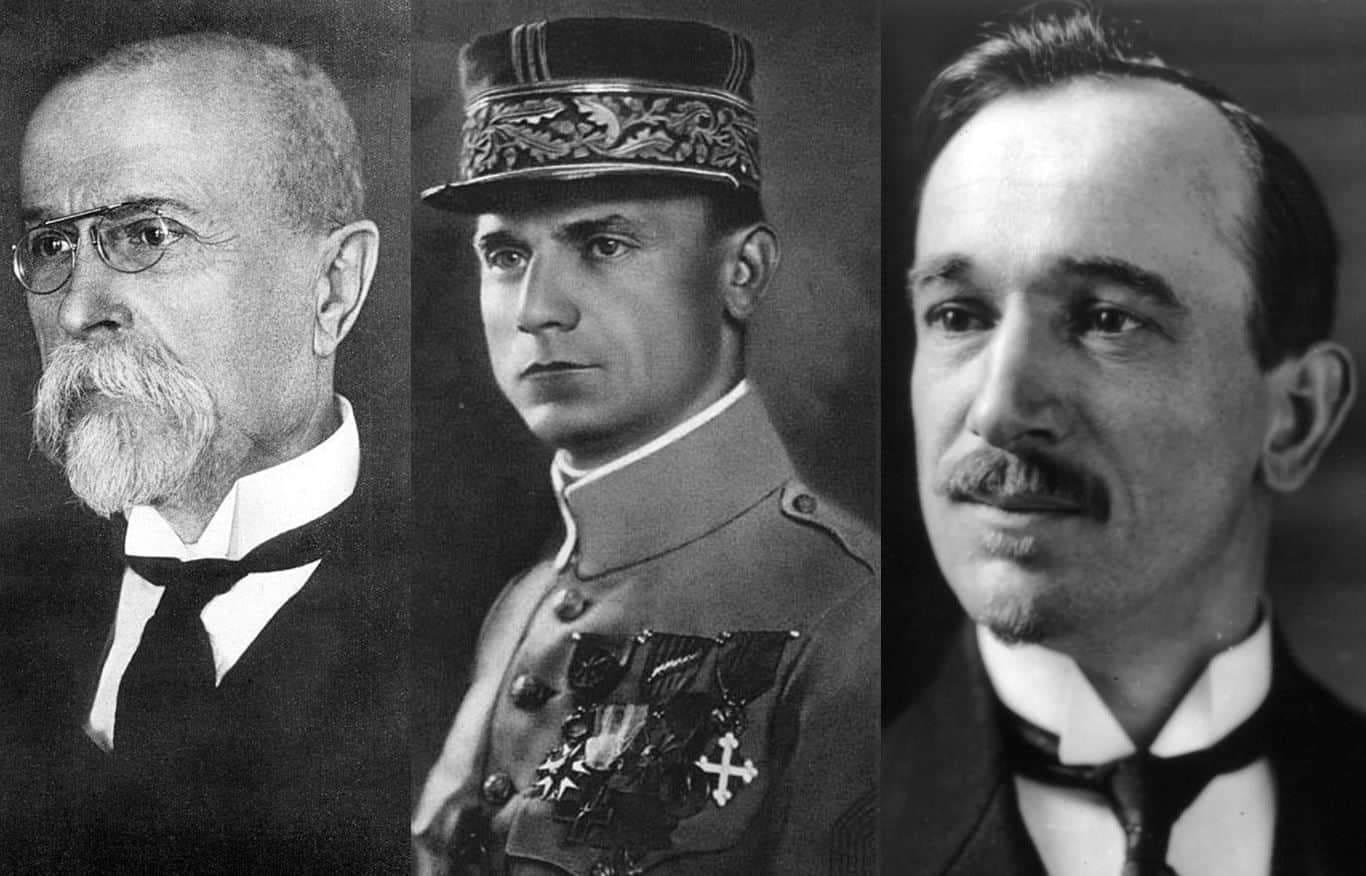
Triumvirate of Tomáš Garrigue Masaryk, Milan Rastislav Štefánik, and Edvard Beneš

During World War I, Beneš was one of the leading organizers of an independent Czechoslovakia from abroad. He organized a pro-independence and anti-Austrian secret resistance movement, Maffia. In September 1915, he went into exile in Paris, where he made intricate diplomatic efforts to gain recognition from France and the United Kingdom for Czechoslovak independence. From 1916 to 1918, he was a Secretary of the Czechoslovak National Council in Paris and Minister of the Interior and of Foreign Affairs in the Provisional Czechoslovak government.

In May 1917, Beneš, Tomáš Garrigue Masaryk and Milan Rastislav Štefánik were reported to be organizing a "Czechoslovak Legion" to fight for the Western Allies in France and Italy, recruited from among Czechs and Slovaks who were able to get to the front and also from the large emigrant populations in the United States, which was said to number more than 1,500,000. The force grew into one of tens of thousands and took part in several battles, including the Battles of Zborov and Bakhmach in Russia.

== Foreign minister ==
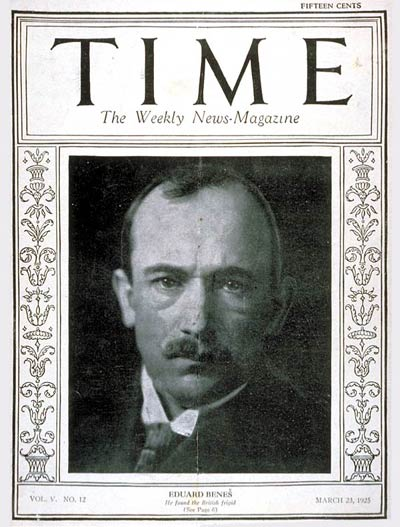
Time cover, 23 March 1925

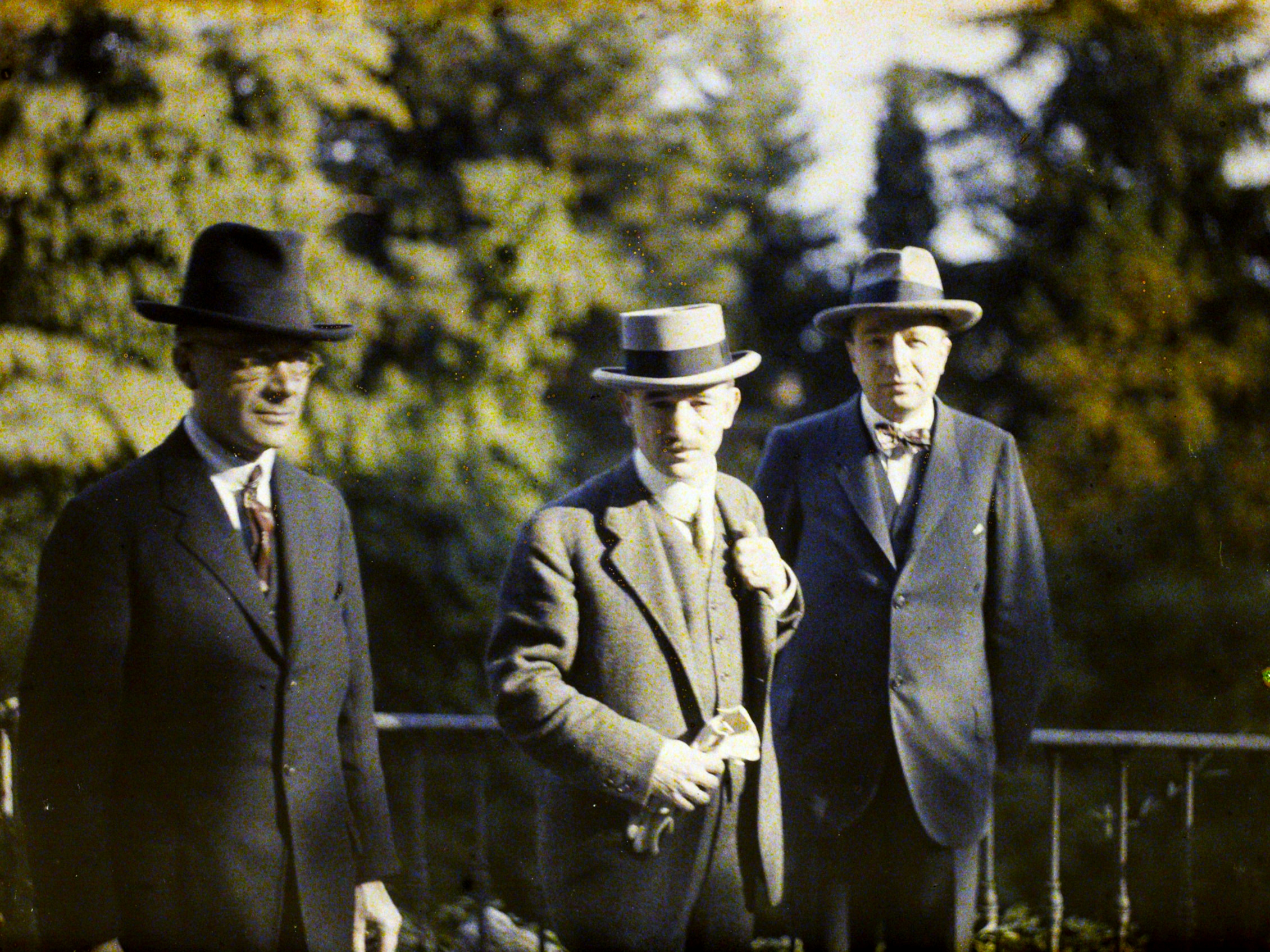
Beneš (center) with the Czechoslovak delegation at the Locarno Treaties, 1925 Autochrome by Roger Dumas

From 1918 to 1935, Beneš was the first and longest-serving Foreign Minister of Czechoslovakia. On 31 October 1918, Karel Kramář reported from Geneva to Prague: "If you saw our Dr. Beneš and his mastery of global questions ... you would take off your hat and say it was truly marvelous!" His international stature was such that he held the post through 10 successive governments, one of which he headed himself from 1921 to 1922. In 1919, his decision to pull demoralized Czechoslovak Legions out of the Russian Civil War was denounced by Kramář as a betrayal. He represented Czechoslovakia at the 1919 peace conference in Paris, which led to the Versailles Treaty.

A committed Czechoslovakist, Beneš did not consider Czechs and Slovaks to be separate ethnicities. He served in the National Assembly from 1920 to 1925 and again from 1929 to 1935, representing the Czechoslovak National Social Party (called the Czechoslovak Social Party until 1925). He briefly returned to the academic world as a professor in 1921. After Jan Černý's first stint as prime minister, Beneš formed a government from September 1921 to October 1922.

In the early 1920s, Beneš and his mentor, President Masaryk, viewed Kramář as the principal threat to Czechoslovak democracy, seeing him as a "reactionary" Czech chauvinist who was opposed to their plans for Czechoslovakia as a multi-cultural, multi-ethnic state. Masaryk and Beneš were openly doubtful of Kramář's commitment to "Western values" that they were committed to, such as democracy, enlightenment, rationality and tolerance, seeing him as a romantic Pan-Slavist who looked towards the east rather than the west for ideas.

Kramář very much resented the way in which Masaryk openly groomed Beneš as his successor, noting that Masaryk put articles into the Constitution that set 45 as the age limit for senators, but 35 as the age limit for the presidency, which conveniently made Beneš eligible for the presidency. The charge of Czech chauvinism against Kramář had some substance as he openly proclaimed his belief that the Czechs should be the dominant people in Czechoslovakia, denounced Masaryk and Beneš for their belief that the Sudeten Germans should be equal to the Czechs, and made clear his opposition to having German as one of the official languages of Czechoslovakia, views that made him abhorrent to Beneš.

In 1927 Beneš was initiated in freemasonry at the Ian Amos Komensky Lodge No. 1.

Between 1923 and 1927, Beneš was a member of the League of Nations Council, serving as president of its committee from 1927 to 1928. He was a renowned and influential figure at international conferences, such as those at Genoa in 1922, at Locarno in 1925, at The Hague in 1930 and at Lausanne in 1932.

== First presidency ==
Portrait of Edvard Beneš by Jaromír Funke, published shortly after Beneš's election as president in December 1935.

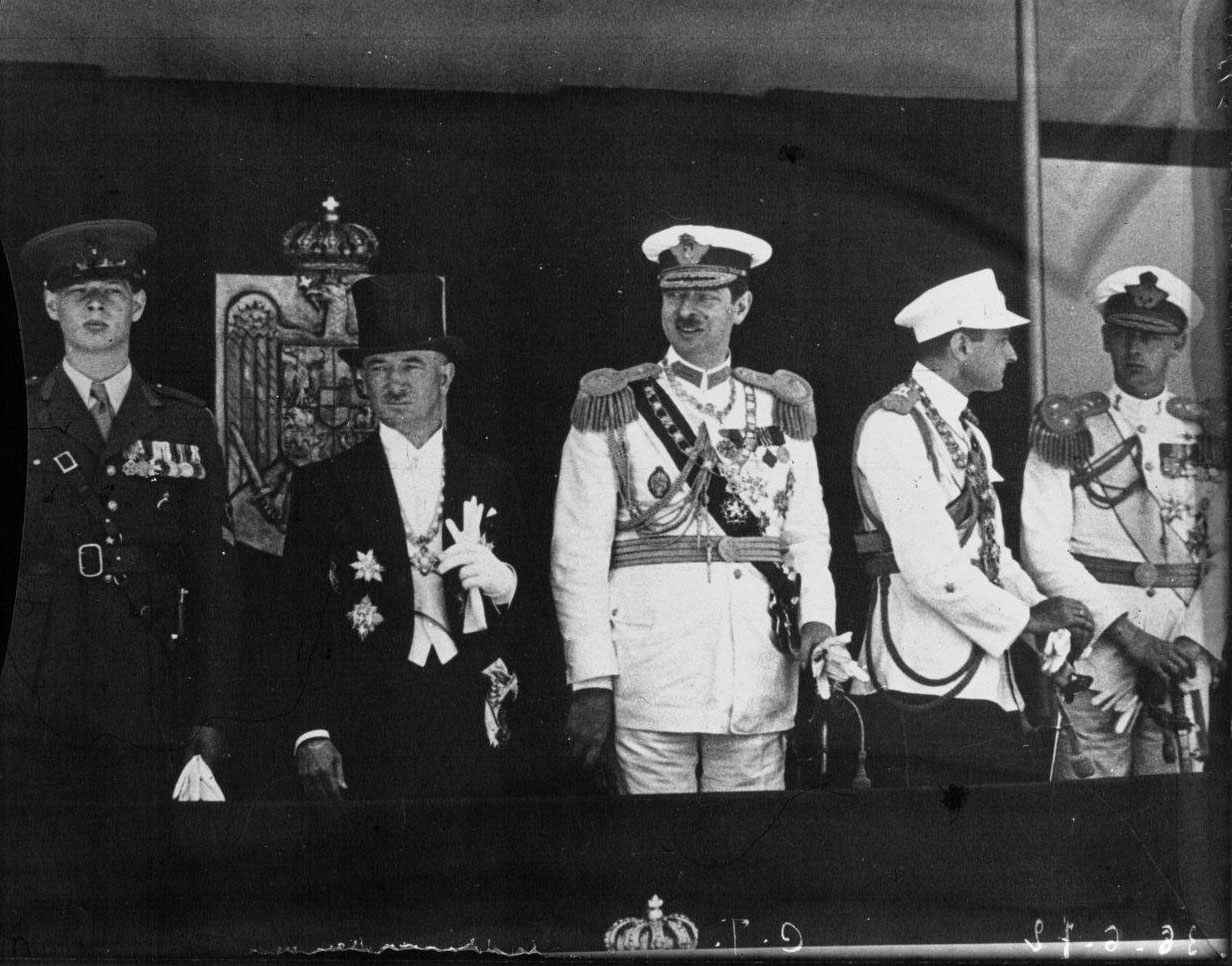
Beneš with several other Little Entente leaders in Bucharest, Kingdom of Romania, in 1936. From left to right: Crown Prince Michael of Romania; President Beneš; King Carol II of Romania; Prince Regent Paul of Yugoslavia; and Prince Nicholas of Romania.

When President Tomáš Masaryk retired in 1935, Beneš succeeded him. Under Masaryk, the Hrad ("the castle", as the Czechs called the presidency) had been built up into a major extra-constitutional institution enjoying considerably more informal power than the plain language of the Constitution indicated. The framers of the Constitution had intended to create a parliamentary system in which the Prime Minister would be the country's leading political figure. However, due to a complex system of proportional representation, a typical National Assembly saw as many as ten parties represented. No party even approached the 151 seats needed for a majority; indeed, no party ever won more than 25 percent of the vote. As mentioned above, there were ten cabinets during Masaryk's presidency.

The Czech historian Igor Lukes wrote about the power of the Hrad under Beneš: "By the spring of 1938, the Czechoslovak parliament, the prime minister, and the cabinet had been pushed aside by Beneš. During the dramatic summer months he was – for better or worse – the sole decision-maker in the country".

=== Sudeten Crisis ===
Edvard Beneš opposed Nazi Germany's claim to the German-speaking Sudetenland in 1938. The crisis began on 24 April 1938 when Konrad Henlein at the party congress of the Sudeten German Party in Karlsbad (modern Karlovy Vary) announced the 8-point "Karlsbad programme" demanding autonomy for the Sudetenland. Beneš rejected the Karlsbad programme, but in May 1938 offered the "Third Plan" which would have created 20 cantons in the Sudetenland with substantial autonomy, which in turn was rejected by Henlein. Beneš was keen to go to war with Germany provided that one or more of the Great Powers fought alongside Czechoslovakia, but was unwilling to fight Germany alone. Sergei Aleksandrovsky, the Soviet minister in Prague, reported to Moscow after talking to Beneš that he was hoping to fight a "war against the whole world" provided the Soviet Union was willing to come in.

In London in May 1938, Beneš came under diplomatic pressure from the British government to accede to the Karlsbad programme, which he initially refused. The British viewed the Sudetenland crisis as a domestic Czechoslovak crisis with international ramifications whereas Beneš saw the crisis as a matter between Czechoslovakia vs. Germany.

In July 1938, the British Foreign Secretary, Lord Halifax, offered the services of a British mediator, Lord Runciman of Doxford, to resolve the crisis, with the promise that Britain would support Czechoslovakia if Beneš was willing to accept the conclusions of Runciman's findings. Seeing a chance to enlist British support, Beneš accepted the Runciman Mission. The British historian A. J. P. Taylor wrote: "Beneš, whatever his other defects, was an incomparable negotiator; and the talents which had been a match for Lloyd George in 1919, soon took Runciman's measure in 1938 ... Instead, Runciman found that he was being maneuvered into a position where he had to endorse the Czech offers as reasonable, and to condemn the obstinacy of the Sudetens, not of Beneš. An appalling consequence [for Britain] loomed ever nearer; if Beneš did all that Runciman asked of him, and more, Great Britain would be saddled with the moral obligation to support Czechoslovakia in the ensuing crisis. To avert this consequence, Runciman, far from urging Beneš on, had to preach delay. Beneš did not allow him to escape."

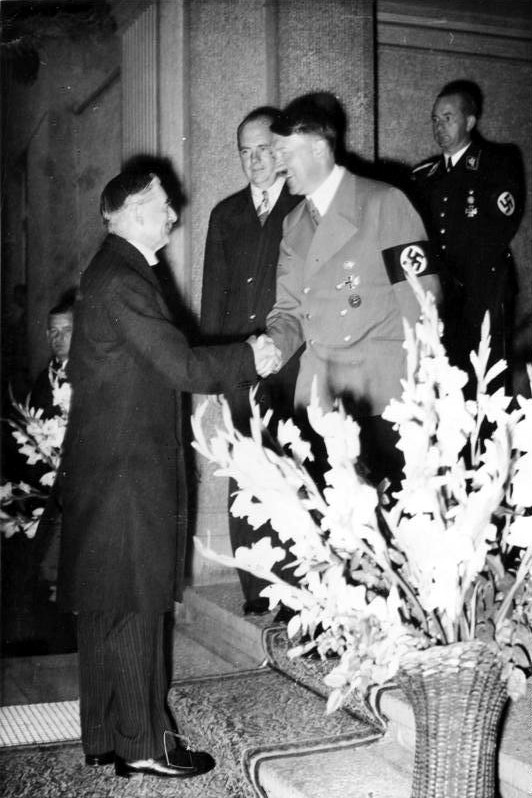
Adolf Hitler greets British prime minister Neville Chamberlain, 24 September 1938.

On 4 September 1938, Beneš presented the "Fourth Plan", which, had it happened, would essentially have turned Czechoslovakia into a federation, and would have given the Sudetenland widespread autonomy. Henlein rejected the Fourth Plan and instead launched a revolt in the Sudetenland, which soon failed. On 12 September 1938, in his keynote speech at the Nuremberg rally, Adolf Hitler demanded the Sudetenland join Germany. On 30 September 1938, Germany, Italy, France and the United Kingdom signed the Munich Agreement, which allowed for the annexation and military occupation of the Sudetenland by Germany. Czechoslovakia was not consulted.

Beneš agreed, despite opposition from within his country, after France and the United Kingdom warned that they would remain neutral in a war between Germany and Czechoslovakia, despite their previous guarantees to the contrary. Beneš was forced to resign on 5 October 1938, under German pressure, and was replaced by Emil Hácha. On Hácha's watch, Czechoslovakia lost more land to Hungary in the First Vienna Award the following month.

Although many Czechs view the Munich Agreement as part of a "Western betrayal", some scholars such as George F. Kennan and John Holroyd-Doveton suggest that the Agreement may have been a surprisingly positive outcome for Czechoslovakia. They argue that, if war had broken out in 1938, Czechoslovakia would have faced a similar destruction to that suffered by Poland the following year. As Poland was attacked in 1939, France launched its unsuccessful Saar Offensive in western Germany. One can only assume France's attack would have been equally futile in 1938, had a Czech-German war been sparked. Kennan wrote in his memoirs:

The benefit of the Munich Agreement was that it has preserved for the exacting task of the future a magnificent younger generation disciplined, industrious and physically fit that would have undoubtedly been sacrificed if the solution had been the romantic one of hopeless resistance rather than the humiliating but true heroic one of realism.

It is the opinion of several Czech, Slovak and German historians that the Czechoslovak border fortifications made the Czechoslovak-German boundary the best-fortified in Europe, as it was built on the French model of the Maginot Line defense system. But despite this, Germany's occupation of Austria earlier that year meant Czechoslovakia could equally have been attacked from the south. If Czechoslovakia had fought, it might have assisted Britain, France and the Soviet Union, but it may not have benefitted Czechoslovakia itself. There were various predictions of how long it would take the German army to defeat the Czechs, but seldom did a prediction contemplate a Czech victory. Speculating the length of a hypothesised Czech-German war, Tomáš Garrigue Masaryk predicted two months, Winston Churchill wagered three months and according to Lavrentiy Beria's son, his father envisioned at least six months. Six months of modern warfare in a small country like Czechoslovakia would likely have left it devastated.

Regardless, in March 1939, German troops marched into what remained of Czechoslovakia. They detached Slovakia as a puppet state, declared the rest of the nation to be the Protectorate of Bohemia and Moravia, and gave back Transcarpathia to Hungary, thereby completing the German occupation of Czechoslovakia which would last until 1945.

== Wartime exile in Britain ==
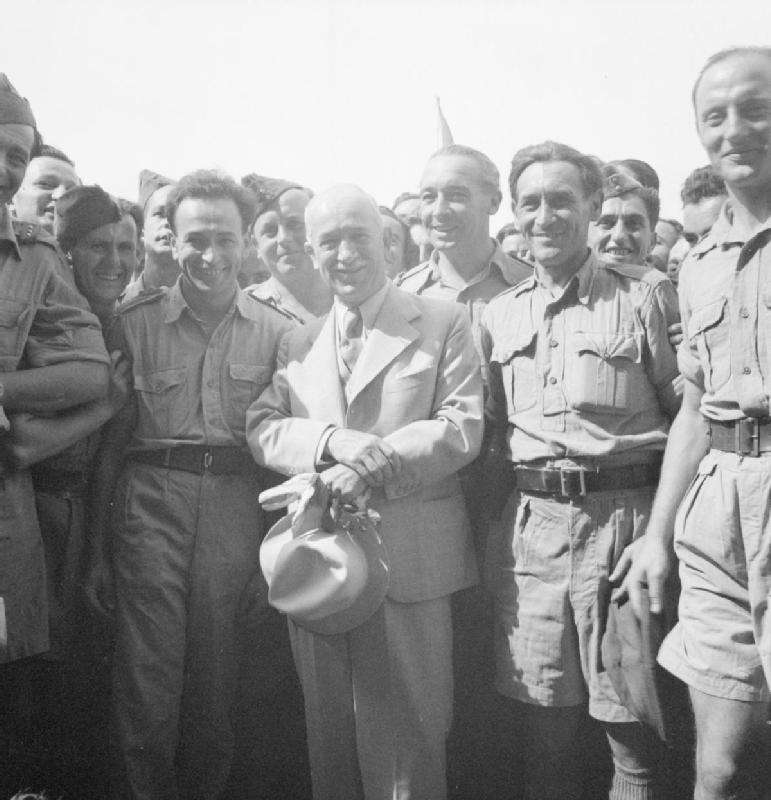
Beneš posing with members of the Czechoslovak Air Force, recently returned to the United Kingdom from the Middle East

On 22 October 1938, Beneš went into exile in Putney, London. Czechoslovakia's intelligence service headed by František Moravec was still loyal to Beneš, which gave him a valuable bargaining chip in his dealings with the British as Paul Thümmel, a high ranking officer of the Abwehr, Germany's military intelligence, was still selling information to Moravec's group.

In July 1939, Beneš realising that "information is power", started to share with the British some of the intelligence provided by "Agent A-54" as Thümmel was code-named. As the British lacked any spies in Germany comparable to Agent A-54, the British were intensely interested in the intelligence provided by him, which Beneš used to bargain with in dealings with the British.

By July 1939, the Danzig crisis had pushed Britain to the brink of war with Germany, and British decision-makers were keenly interested in any high-level intelligence about Germany. In the summer of 1939, Beneš hoped that the Danzig crisis would end in war, seeing a war with Germany as his only hope of restoring Czechoslovakia. At the same time, Beneš started to have regular lunches with Winston Churchill, at the time only a backbench Conservative MP, and Harold Nicolson, a backbencher National Labour MP who was likewise opposed to the Munich Agreement. Besides his new British friends like Churchill and Nicolson, Beneš also resumed contact with old British friends from World War I such as the historian Robert Seton-Watson and the journalist Henry Wickham Steed, who wrote articles urging the restoration of Czechoslovakia to its pre-Munich Agreement borders.

On 23 August 1939, Beneš met Ivan Maisky, the Soviet ambassador to the Court of St. James, to ask for Soviet support. According to Maisky's diary, Beneš told him that he wanted a common frontier between Czechoslovakia and the Soviet Union. Furthermore, Maisky's diary had Beneš saying that if Czechoslovakia were restored, he would cede Ruthenia, whose people Beneš noted were mostly Ukrainian, to the Soviet Union to bring about a common frontier.

On the same day, Beneš learned of the Molotov–Ribbentrop pact. When he confronted Maisky, he was told that war would break out "in two weeks' time", causing Beneš to write: "My overall impression is that the Soviets want war, they have prepared for it conscientiously and they maintain that the war will take place – and that they have reserved some freedom of action for themselves ... [The pact was] a rather rough tactic to drive Hitler into war ... the Soviets are convinced that the time has come for a final struggle between capitalism, fascism and Nazism and that there will be a world revolution, which they will trigger at an opportune moment when others are exhausted by war". Maisky would be proven right on 1 September, when Germany invaded Poland, and the British and French both declared war on Germany two days later.

=== Organizing the government-in-exile ===
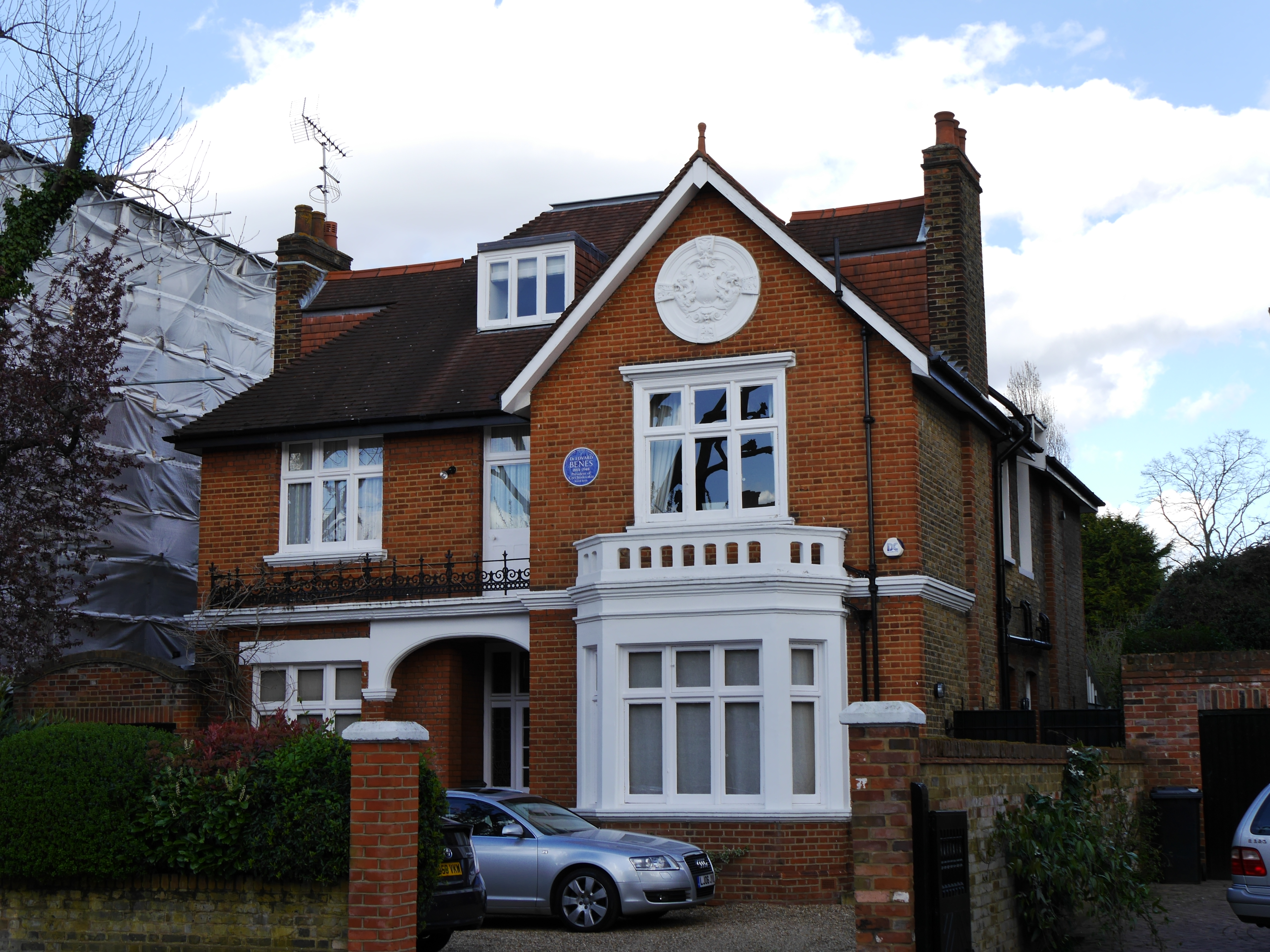
26 Gwendolen Avenue in Putney, where Beneš lived between 1938 and 1940

In October 1939, Beneš organised the Czechoslovak National Liberation Committee, which immediately declared itself the Provisional Government of Czechoslovakia. Britain and France withheld full recognition, though unofficial contacts were permitted. A major issue in wartime Anglo-Czechoslovak relations was the Munich Agreement, which the British still stood by, and which Beneš wanted the British to abrogate. The issue was important because as long the British continued to view the Munich Agreement as being in effect, they recognized the Sudetenland as part of Germany, a British war aim that Beneš naturally objected to.

A problem for Beneš during the Phoney War in the winter of 1939–40 was the British Prime Minister Neville Chamberlain attached much hope to the idea that anti-Nazi conservatives in Germany would persuade the Wehrmacht to overthrow Hitler, and as the anti-Nazi conservatives were adamant that the Sudetenland remain part of Germany, Chamberlain made it clear that Britain was not at war to undo the Munich Agreement.

On 22 February 1940 during a secret meeting in Switzerland between Ulrich von Hassell representing the German conservatives and James Lonsdale-Bryans representing Great Britain, the former told the latter there was no possibility of a post-Nazi Germany ever agreeing to return the Sudetenland. In 1939 and 1940, Chamberlain repeatedly made public statements that Britain was willing to make an "honorable peace" with a post-Nazi Germany, which meant the Sudetenland would remain within the Reich. Beneš with his insistence on restoring Czechoslovakia to its pre-Munich borders was seen by Chamberlain as an obstacle that was standing in the way of his hope that the Wehrmacht would depose Hitler.

After the Dunkirk evacuation, Britain was faced with a German invasion while the British Army had lost most of its equipment, which it had to abandon at Dunkirk. At the same time, 500 Czechoslovak airmen had arrived in Britain together with half of a division, which Beneš called his "last and most impressive argument" for diplomatic recognition. On 21 July 1940, the United Kingdom recognised the National Liberation Committee as being the Czechoslovak government-in-exile, with Jan Šrámek as prime minister and Beneš as president. In reclaiming the presidency, Beneš took the line that his 1938 resignation was void since it had been under duress.

The intelligence provided by Agent A-54 was greatly valued by MI6, the British intelligence service, and Beneš used it to improve his bargaining position, telling the British he would share more intelligence from Agent A-54 in return for concessions to his government-in-exile. As part of his efforts to improve his bargaining position, Beneš often exaggerated to the British the efficiency of Moravec's group, the Czechoslovak army in exile and the underground UVOD resistance group. Besides Agent A-54, the Prime Minister of the Czech government under the Protectorate, General Alois Eliáš, was in contact with Moravec's agents. Beneš's efforts paid off as he was invited to lunch, first at 10 Downing Street by Churchill (who was now Prime Minister), and then by King George VI at Buckingham Palace.

In September 1940, MI6 set up a communications center in Surrey for Czechoslovak intelligence and in October 1940 a Victorian mansion at Leamington Spa was given to the Czechoslovak brigade under General Miroslav. At the same time, Moravec's group began to work with the Special Operations Executive (SOE) to plan resistance in the Protectorate of Bohemia-Moravia, though the distance between Britain and the Protectorate made it difficult for the SOE to parachute in agents.

In November 1940, in the wake of the London Blitz, Beneš, his wife, their nieces and his household staff moved to The Abbey at Aston Abbotts, near Aylesbury in Buckinghamshire. The staff of his private office, including his secretary, Eduard Táborský, and his chief of staff, Jaromír Smutný, moved to the Old Manor House in the neighbouring village of Wingrave, and his military intelligence staff, headed by František Moravec, was stationed in the nearby village of Addington.

=== Operation Barbarossa begins ===
Beneš's relations with the Polish government-in-exile headed by General Władysław Sikorski were difficult due to the Teschen dispute, as General Sikorski insisted on claiming the region for Poland, while Beneš argued that it should return to Czechoslovakia when the war was over. However, Beneš felt a Polish-Czechoslovak alliance was needed to counter Germany in the post-war world, and came around to the idea of a Polish-Czechoslovak federation as the best way of squaring the circle caused by the Teschen dispute. In November 1940, Beneš and Sikorski signed an agreement in principle calling for federation, though Beneš's insistence that the Slovaks were not a nation and Slovakia would not be a full member of the federation caused much tension between himself and Slovak members of the government-in-exile.

However, after Operation Barbarossa brought the Soviet Union into the war in June 1941, Beneš started to lose interest in the project, though a detailed agreement for the proposed federation was worked out and signed in January 1942. The Russophile Beneš always felt more comfortable with dealing with Russians rather than the Poles, whose behavior in September 1938 was a source of much resentment to Beneš. The promise from the Narkomindel that the Soviet Union supported returning Teschen to Czechoslovakia negated the whole purpose of the proposed federation for Beneš.

On 22 June 1941, Germany launched Operation Barbarossa and invaded the Soviet Union. President Emil Hacha of the puppet government serving under the Protectorate praised Hitler in a statement for launching the "crusade against Bolshevism" and urged Czech workers to work even harder for a German victory, observing that much of the material used by the Wehrmacht was manufactured in the Protectorate. Through Moravec, Beneš sent word to both General Eliáš and Hacha that they should resign rather than give comfort to the enemy, stating his belief that the Soviet Union would inevitably defeat Germany and thus would have a decisive role in the affairs of Eastern Europe after the war. Moreover, Beneš charged that if most of the resistance work in the Protectorate were done by the Czech communists that would give them "a pretext to take over power on the basis of the justified reproach that we helped Hitler".

During the war Beneš told Ilya Ehrenburg, the Soviet writer: "The only salvation lies in a close alliance with your country. The Czechs may have different political opinions, but on one point we can be sure. The Soviet Union will not only liberate us from the Germans. It will also allow us to live without constant fear of the future."

On 18 July 1941, the Soviet Union and UK recognized Beneš's government-in-exile, promised non-interference in the internal affairs of Czechoslovakia, allowed the government-in-exile to raise an army to fight alongside the Red Army on the Eastern Front; and recognized the borders of Czechoslovakia as those before the Munich Agreement. The last was the most important to Beneš, as the British government still maintained that the Munich Agreement was in effect and regarded the Sudetenland as part of Germany. Even the United States (which was neutral) very tentatively regarded the government-in-exile as only a "provisional" government and rather vaguely stated the borders of Czechoslovakia were to be determined after the war, implying the Sudetenland might remain part of Germany.

=== Working with the Czech resistance ===
During the summer and fall of 1941, Beneš came under increasing pressure from the Allies to have the Czechs play a greater role in resistance work. The Narkomindel informed Beneš that the Soviets were disappointed that there was so little sabotage going on in the factories of the Protectorate of Bohemia and Moravia, which were such an important source of arms and other material for the Wehrmacht. Likewise, the British started to demand that the Czechs do more resistance work. Moravec after meeting the MI6's Director, Stewart Menzies, told Beneš that the British viewpoint was that when the United Kingdom was fighting for its life that "placing violets at the grave of the unknown soldier was simply not good enough".

Making matters worse for Beneš was in late September 1941 that Reinhard Heydrich, who effectively taken over the Protectorate, launched a major crackdown on resistance. The Prime Minister, General Eliáš, was arrested on 27 September 1941 on Heydrich's orders; martial law was proclaimed in the Protectorate; thousands were arrested and executed including two prominent leaders of the UVOD resistance group, Josef Bílý and Hugo Vojta who were arrested and shot without trial.

On 5 October 1941, the lines of communication between the UVOD group and London were severed when the Gestapo, during the course of its raids, seized various radios and the codes for communicating with London. At the same time, the Gestapo also learned of the existence of Agent A-54 and after an investigation arrested Thümmel, depriving Beneš of one of his most valuable bargaining chips. Faced with this situation when the Allies were demanding more Czech resistance at the same time that Heydrich had launching a crackdown that was weakening the resistance, Beneš decided in October 1941 on a spectacular act of resistance that would prove to the world that the Czechs were still resisting.

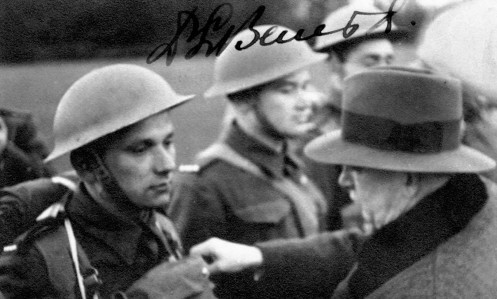
Edvard Beneš (right) gives medals to soldiers, including the later Operation Anthropoid assassins Jozef Gabčík and Jan Kubiš, 1940.

In 1941, Beneš and František Moravec planned Operation Anthropoid to assassinate Reinhard Heydrich, a high-ranking German official who was responsible for suppressing Czech culture, and for deporting and executing members of the Czech resistance. Beneš felt his dealings with the Allies, especially his campaign to persuade the British to nullify the Munich Agreement, was being weakened by the lack of any visible resistance in the Protectorate. Beneš decided that assassinating Heydrich was the best way to improve his bargaining position, and it was largely he who pressed for Operation Anthropoid.

Upon learning of the nature of the mission, resistance leaders begged the Czechoslovak government-in-exile to call off the attack, saying that "An attempt against Heydrich's life ... would be of no use to the Allies and its consequences for our people would be immeasurable." Beneš personally broadcast a message insisting that the attack go forwards, although he denied any involvement after the war. Historian Vojtěch Mastný argues that he "clung to the scheme as the last resort to dramatize Czech resistance." The 1942 assassination resulted in brutal German reprisals such as the execution of thousands of Czechs and the eradication of two villages: Lidice and Ležáky.

Arnold J. Toynbee, a prominent historian at the time, vehemently made the argument that the Czech regime was largely comparable to the situations in Germany, Poland and with the Magyars.

=== Britain rejects the Munich Agreement ===
In 1942, Beneš finally persuaded the Foreign Office to issue a statement saying Britain had revoked the Munich Agreement and supported the return of the Sudetenland to Czechoslovakia. Beneš saw the statement by the Foreign Secretary, Anthony Eden, to the House of Commons on 5 August 1942 revoking the Munich Agreement as a diplomatic triumph for himself. Beneš had been greatly embittered by the behavior of the ethnic Germans of the Sudetenland in 1938, which he viewed as treasonous, and during his exile in London had decided that when Czechoslovakia was reestablished, he was going to expel all of the Sudeten Germans into Germany.

At the Munich Debate in the House of Commons, Anthony Eden acknowledged that there had been "discrimination, even severe discrimination" against the Sudeten Germans. During his exile, Beneš had come to obsessively brood over the behavior of the Sudetenlanders and had reached the conclusion that they were all collectively guilty of treason. In 1942, he stated the compulsory population exchange between Greece and Turkey in 1922–23 was his model for solving the problem of the Sudetenland, though unlike the Greek-Turkish population exchange, he proposed financial compensation to be paid to the Sudeten Germans expelled into Germany.

Although not a Communist, Beneš was also on friendly terms with Joseph Stalin. Believing that Czechoslovakia had more to gain from an alliance with the Soviet Union than one with Poland, he torpedoed plans for a Polish–Czechoslovak confederation and in 1943, he signed an entente with the Soviets. During his visit to Moscow to sign the alliance, Beneš complained about the "feudal" systems existing in Poland and Hungary, charging that unlike Czechoslovakia, which after World War I had broken up the estates owned mostly by ethnic Germans and Hungarians, the majority of the land in Poland and Hungary was still owned by the nobility, which he claimed was the source of political and economic backwardness in both nations.

Beneš believed in the ideal of "convergence" between the Soviet Union and the western nations, arguing that based on what he was seeing in wartime Britain that the western nations would become more socialist after the war while at same time that wartime liberalising reforms in the Soviet Union meant the Soviet system would be more "western" after the war. Beneš hoped and believed that the wartime alliance of the "Big Three" of the Soviet Union, the United Kingdom, and the United States would continue after the war, with the "Big Three" co-operating in an international system that would hold Germany in check.

Though Beneš did not attend the Tehran Conference himself, the news of the mood of harmony that prevailed among the American, Soviet and British delegations at Tehran certainly gave him hope that the Big Three alliance would continue after the war. Beneš saw the role of Czechoslovakia and his own role as being that of a mediator between the Big Three. The fact that his old friend Churchill took him into his confidence concerning the post-war borders of Poland boosted Beneš's own perception of himself as an important diplomat, settling the disputes of Eastern Europe. After talking to Beneš for four hours on 4 January 1944 about Poland's post-war borders, Churchill cabled to American President Franklin D. Roosevelt: "Beneš may be most useful in trying to make the Poles see reason and in reconciling them to the Russians, whose confidence he has long possessed".

== Second presidency ==
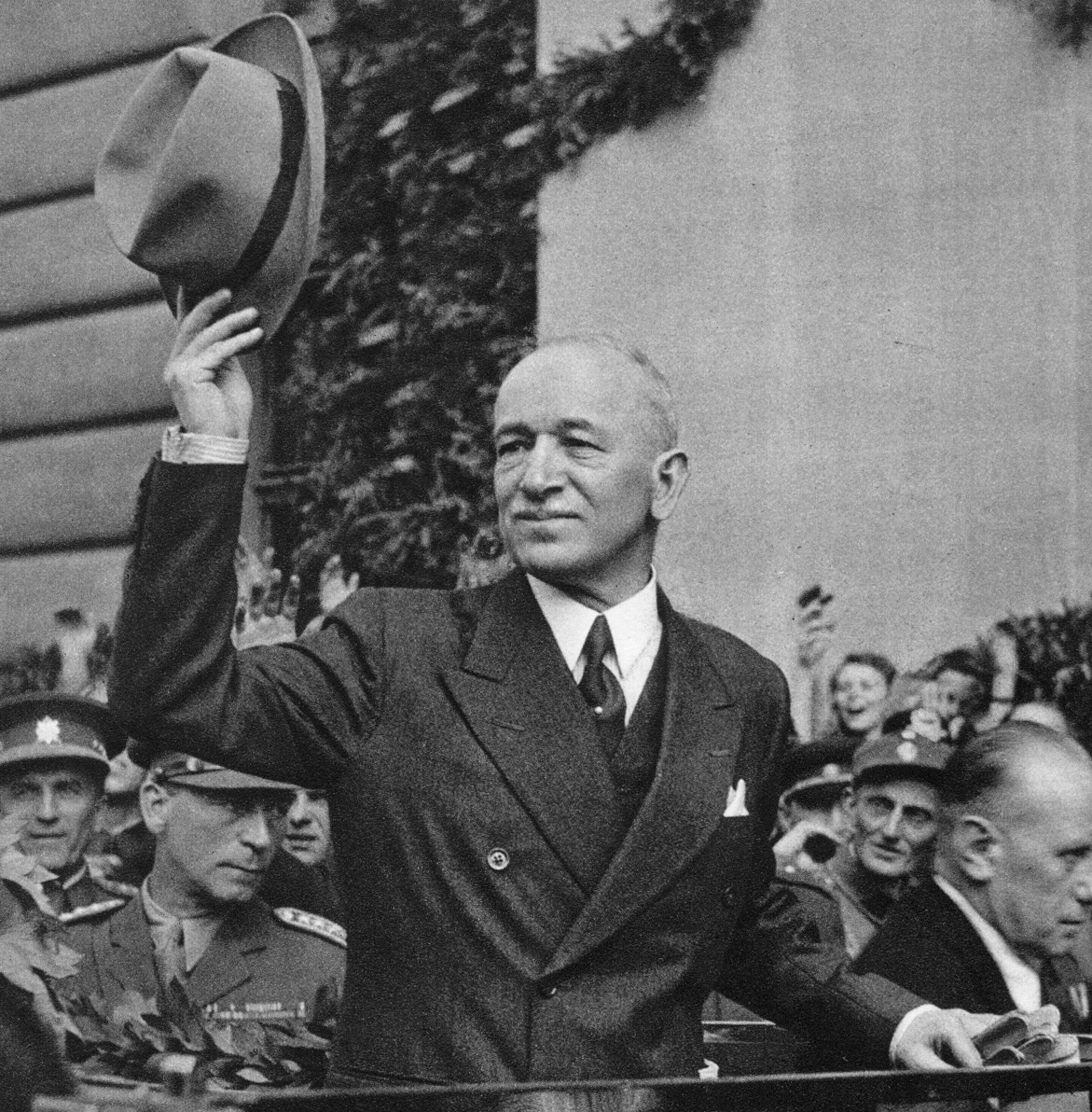
Beneš returning to Prague after the Prague uprising, 16 May 1945

In April 1945, Beneš flew from London to Košice in eastern Slovakia, which had been taken by the Red Army and which became the temporary capital of Czechoslovakia. Upon arriving, Beneš formed a coalition government called the National Front, with the Communist Party leader Klement Gottwald as prime minister. Besides Gottwald, communists were named as ministers of defence, the interior, education, information, and agriculture. The most important non-Communist minister was the foreign minister, Jan Masaryk, the long-term Czechoslovak minister in London and son of Tomáš Masaryk. Besides the Communists, the other parties in the National Front government were the Social Democratic Party, Beneš's own National Social Party (no relation to Hitler's National Socialists), the People's Party and the Slovak Democratic Party.

Beneš also instituted the Košice programme, which declared that Czechoslovakia was now to be a state of Czechs and Slovaks with the German population in the Sudetenland and the Hungarian population in Slovakia to be expelled; there was to be a degree of decentralization with the Slovaks to have their own National Council, but no federation; capitalism was to continue, but the "commanding heights" of the economy were to be controlled by the state; and finally Czechoslovakia was to pursue a pro-Soviet foreign policy.

=== Role in the Prague uprising ===
During the Prague uprising, which started on 5 May 1945, the city was surrounded by Wehrmacht and SS units, the latter in a vengeful mood. The Czech resistance appealed to the First Division of the German-sponsored Russian Liberation Army commanded by General Sergei Bunyachenko to switch sides, promising them that they be granted asylum in Czechoslovakia and would not be repatriated to the Soviet Union, where they faced execution for treason for fighting for Germany. As the Czech resistance lacked heavy arms such as tanks and artillery, the First Division was badly needed to help hold Prague.

General Bunyachenko and his First Division defected to the Allied side, where it played a key role in holding off the German forces intent on retaking Prague and prevented the SS from massacring the people of Prague. However, when General Bunyachenko learned on 7 May that he and his men would not be offered asylum after all, the First Division abandoned Prague in order to surrender to the American 3rd Army. Despite the promise that the men of First Division would be granted asylum, Beneš instead repatriated the First Division, and the rest of the Russian Liberation Army men in Czechoslovakia who were captured by his government, to the Soviet Union.

=== Return to Prague ===
After the Prague uprising at the end of World War II, Beneš returned home and resumed his former position as president. Article 58.5 of the Constitution said, "The former president shall stay in his or her function till the new president shall be elected". He was unanimously confirmed in office by the Interim National Assembly on 28 October 1945. In December 1945, all of the Red Army forces left Czechoslovakia. On 19 June 1946, Beneš was formally elected to his second term as president.

Beneš presided over a coalition government, the National Front, from 1946 headed by Communist Party leader Klement Gottwald as prime minister. In the elections of May 1946, the Communists won 38% of the vote with the Czech National Social Party winning 18%, the People's Party 16%, the Slovak Democrats 14% and the Social Democrats 13%. Until the summer of 1947, Czechoslovakia had what the British historian Richard J. Crampton called "a period of relative tranquility" with democracy reestablished, and institutions such as the media, opposition parties, the churches, the Sokols, and the Legionnaire veteran associations all existing outside of state control.

In July 1947, both Beneš and Gottwald had decided to accept Marshall Plan aid, only for the Kremlin to order Gottwald to do a U-turn on the question of accepting the Marshall Plan. When Beneš visited Moscow, the Soviet Foreign Minister Vyacheslav Molotov quite brutally informed him that the Kremlin regarded accepting Marshall Plan aid as a violation of the 1943 alliance, causing Beneš on his return to Prague to speak of a "second Munich", saying it was not acceptable for the Soviet Union to veto decisions made by Czechoslovakia. The volte-face on the issue of the Marshall Plan did much damage to the image of the Czechoslovak Communists, and public opinion started to turn against them. A public opinion poll showed that only 25% of the voters planned to vote Communist after the rejection of the Marshall Plan.

In September 1947, the Communist-dominated police in Slovakia announced the discovery of an alleged separatist plot led by the followers of Father Tiso who were allegedly infiltrating the Slovak Democrats, but by November 1947, the supposed plot was revealed as a canard, with the media exposing the evidence for it as being manufactured by the police. The scandal in Slovakia led to demands by the other parties of the National Front that the police be depoliticised. During this time, Beneš had become increasingly disillusioned with the Communists, telling his ambassador in Belgrade to report to him personally, as there were so many Communist agents both in the Czechoslovak embassy in Belgrade and in his own office that it was the only way of ensuring secrecy.

=== Expulsion of the Germans and the Hungarians ===
Beneš opposed the presence of Germans in the liberated republic. Believing that vigilante justice would be less divisive than trials, upon his arrival in Prague on 10 May, he called for the "liquidation" of Germans and Hungarians in the "interest of a united national state of Czechs and Slovaks." As part of the Košice programme, Germans in the Sudetenland and Hungarians in Slovakia were to be expelled.

The Beneš decrees (officially called "Decrees of the President of the Republic"), among other things, illegally expropriated the property of citizens of German and Hungarian ethnicity and then laid down a national legal framework for the loss of citizenship and the expropriations of about three million Germans, and Hungarians. However, Beneš's plans for expelling the Hungarian minority from Slovakia caused tensions with Hungary, whose coalition government was likewise leaning towards the Soviet Union, and ultimately objections from Moscow ended the expulsion of the Hungarians shortly after it had begun. In contrast, the Soviets had no objections to the Expulsion of Germans from Czechoslovakia, and the Czechoslovak authorities continued to expel the Sudeten Germans they said pursuant to the Potsdam Agreement. That, however, was not the case as they failed to follow the directions of Article 12 of the Potsdam Protocols which said estimates had to be provided to the Allied Control Commission beforehand (they were not), and that all populations had to be treated in and orderly and humane way. The opposite occurred in Czechoslovakia. Only a negligible number of Germans remained in the Sudetenland.

On 15 March 1946, SS Obergruppenführer Karl Hermann Frank went on trial in Prague for war crimes. Beneš ensured that Frank's trial received maximum publicity, being broadcast live on state radio, and statements from Frank's interrogations being leaked to the press. On the stand, Frank remained a defiant Nazi, snarling insults at his Czech prosecutors, saying the Czechs were still Untermenschen ("sub-humans") as far he was concerned, and only expressing regret that he did not kill more Czechs when he had the chance. After Frank's conviction, he was publicly hanged before thousands of cheering people outside of Pankrác Prison on 22 May 1946. As Frank was a Sudeten German, the political purpose of his trial was to symbolize to the world what Beneš called the "collective criminality" of the Sudeten Germans, which thus justified their expulsions. The historian Mary Heimann wrote that though Frank was indeed guilty of war crimes and treason, his trial was used for a political purpose, namely to illustrate the collective criminality of the Sudeten Germans to the world.

=== Communist coup of 1948 ===
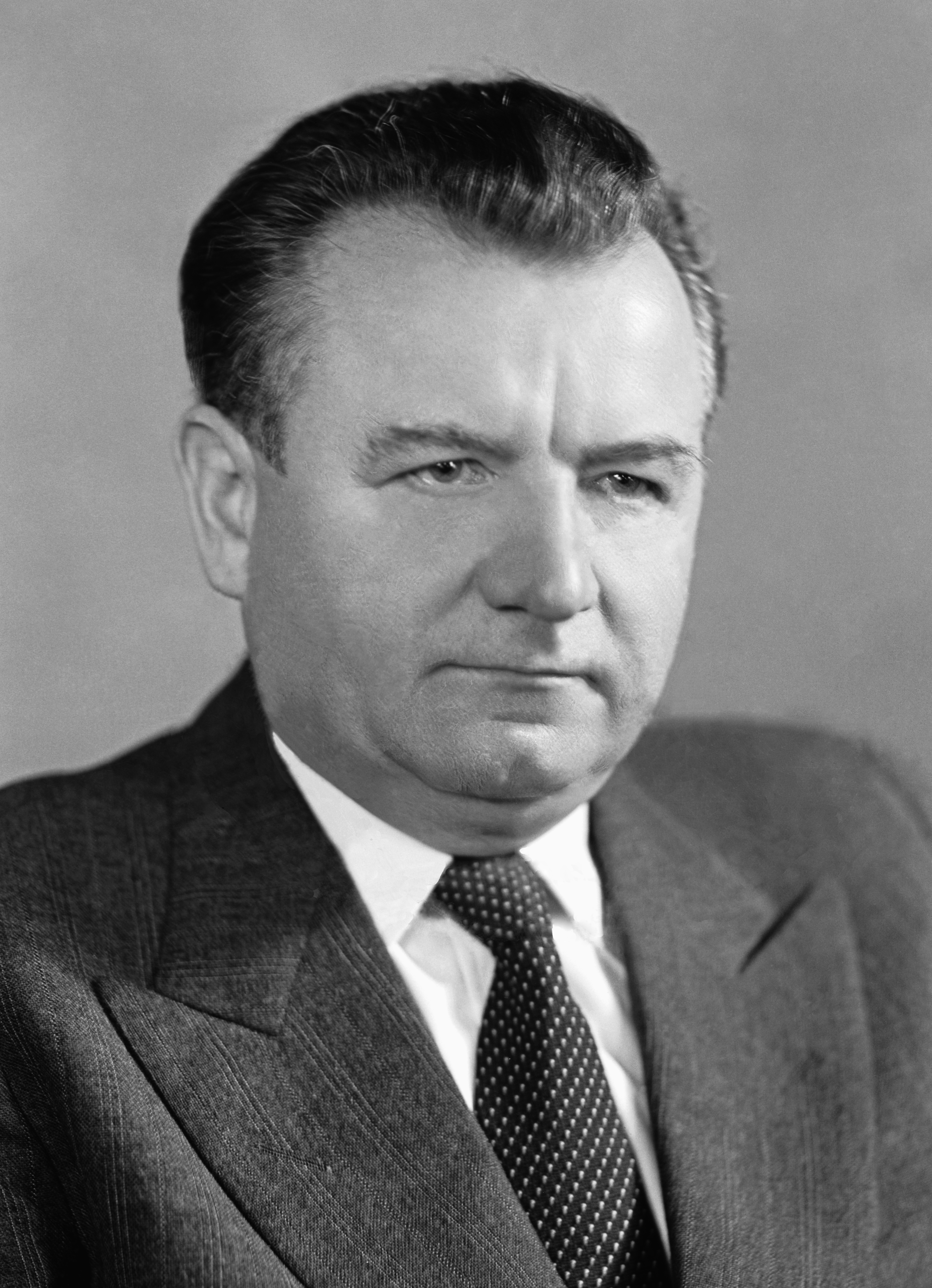
Communist Party leader Klement Gottwald, whose coup ousted Beneš for the second time

On 12 February 1948, the non-Communist ministers threatened to resign unless the "packing" of the police by the Communist interior minister, Václav Nosek, stopped at once. The Communists set up "action committees"; Nosek ordered the civil servants to comply with the committees' directives. Nosek also illegally had arms issued to the action committees. On 20 February, the Communists formed a "people's militia" of 15,000. On 21 February 1948, 12 non-Communist ministers resigned to protest Gottwald's refusal to stop the packing of the police with Communists despite the majority of the Cabinet having ordered it to end. The non-Communists believed that Beneš would side with them to allow them to stay in office as a caretaker government until new elections.

Beneš initially refused to accept their resignations and insisted that no government could be formed without the non-Communist parties. However, Gottwald had by this time dropped all pretense of working within the system. He threatened a general strike unless Beneš appointed a Communist-dominated government. The Communists also occupied the offices of the non-Communists who had resigned. Faced with the crisis, Beneš hesitated and sought more time.

On 22 February, a large parade by the Communist action committees took place in Prague, and ended with the people's militia attacking the offices of opposition parties and the Sokols. Amid fears that civil war was imminent and rumours that the Red Army would sweep in to back Gottwald, Beneš gave way. On 25 February, he accepted the resignations of the non-Communist ministers and appointed a new Communist-dominated government in accordance with Gottwald's specifications. The non-Communist parties were still nominally represented, so the government was still technically a coalition. However, with the exception of Masaryk, the non-Communist ministers were fellow travellers. In effect, Beneš had given legal sanction to a Communist coup.

During the crisis, Beneš failed to rally support as he could have done from the Sokols, the Legionnaire veterans' associations, the churches and many of the university students. Richard J. Crampton wrote: "In February 1948, Beneš still commanded enormous respect and authority", and if he had used his moral prestige, he could have rallied public opinion against the Communists. However, Beneš still saw Germany as the main danger to Czechoslovakia and ultimately believed that Czechoslovakia needed the alliance with the Soviet Union more than the other way around, and as such Prague could never afford a lasting rift with Moscow. Finally, Beneš was a deeply ill man in February 1948, suffering from hypertension, arteriosclerosis and Pott's disease, and his poor health contributed to the lack of fight in him.

Shortly afterward, elections were held in which voters were presented with a single list from the National Front, now a Communist-dominated organization. On 12 March 1948, professor Václav Černý visited Beneš at his villa at Sezimovo Ústí, where the president accused Joseph Stalin of using him. According to Černý, Beneš used such violent and vulgar language about Stalin that he did not bother writing down the president's commentary, believing it was unpublishable.

The Constituent National Assembly, now a subservient tool of the Communists, approved a new constitution on 9 May. Although it was not a completely Communist document, the influence of the 1936 Soviet Constitution (known as the "Stalin Constitution") was strong enough that Beneš refused to sign it. He resigned as president on 7 June 1948, and Gottwald took over most presidential functions until being elected his successor a week later.

On 14 August 1948, the Soviet and Czechoslovak media launched a campaign of vilification against Beneš, accusing him of being an enemy of the Soviet Union and claimed that he refused a Soviet offer of unilateral military assistance in September 1938 because he wanted the Munich Agreement imposed on Czechoslovakia.

On his deathbed, Beneš became furious about the claim the Soviet Union had offered to help unilaterally in 1938 with the former presidential chancellor Jaromír Smutný writing: "He would like to know when, by whom and to whom was the offer made". During the Communist era in Czechoslovakia, Beneš was vilified as a traitor for turning down this purported offer.

== Death and legacy ==
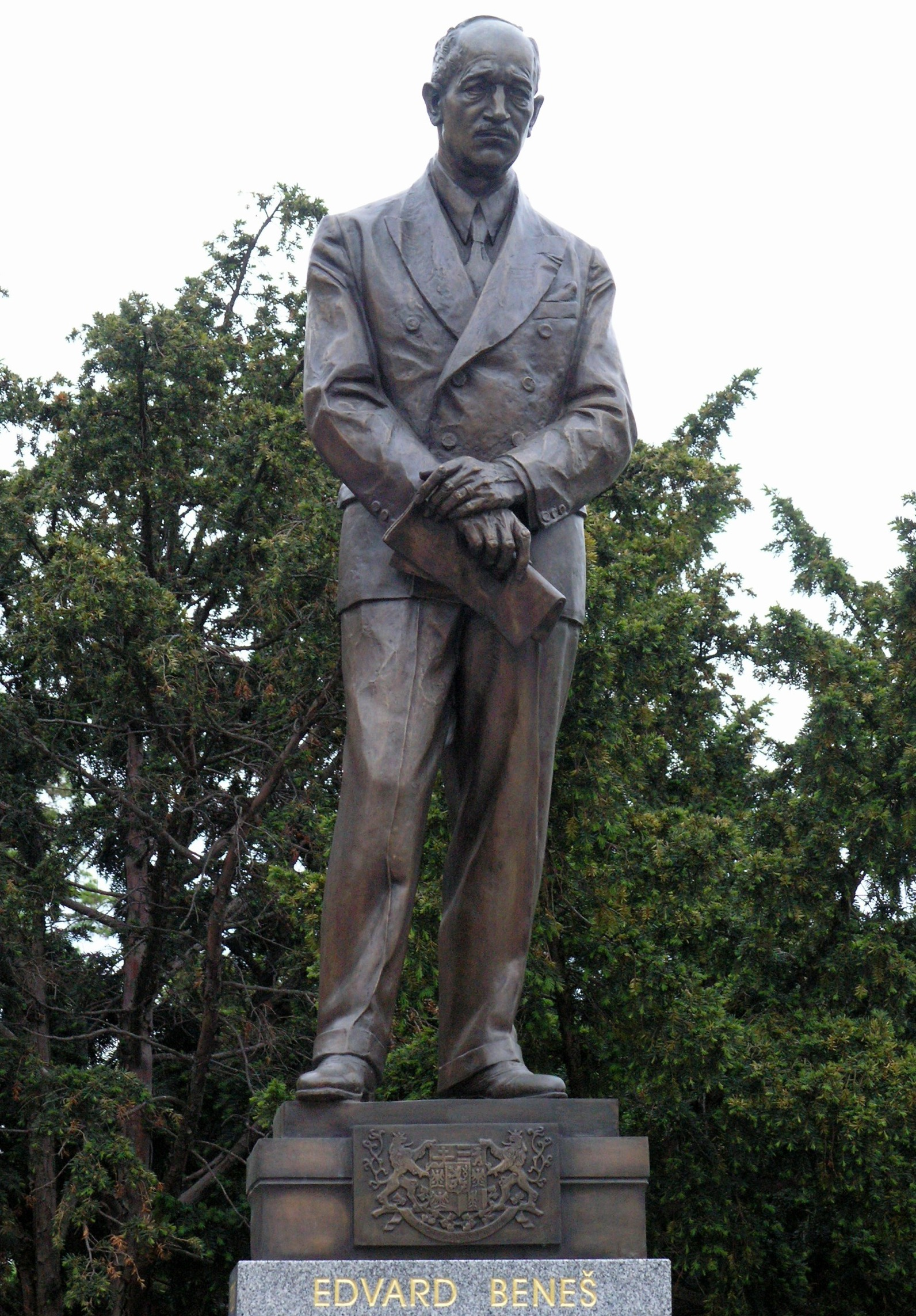
Statue of Beneš in front of Czernin Palace, headquarters of the Czech Ministry of Foreign Affairs in Prague

Beneš had been in poor health since the spring of 1945, when he suffered a minor stroke. He suffered two more strokes in 1947, and seeing the undoing of his life's work left him completely broken. In a 2018 interview with Radio Prague International, historian Igor Lukes recalled that by February 1948, Beneš's poor health left him "a shell of a man" who did not have the emotional or physical stamina to hold out against the "rough, rough players" of the Communist Party.

He died of natural causes at his villa in Sezimovo Ústí on 3 September 1948, seven months after the communist coup. He is interred in the garden of his villa, and his bust is part of the headstone. His wife Hana, who lived until 2 December 1974, is interred next to him.

Much controversy remains on his character and policy. According to the SVR, Beneš had closely co-operated with the Soviet intelligence before the war especially with Soviet agent Pyotr Zubov.

Beneš's friend, the British historian A. J. P. Taylor, wrote in 1945: "Beck, Stojadinović, Antonescu, and Bonnet despised Beneš's integrity and prided themselves on their cunning; but their countries, too, fell before the German aggressor, and every step they took has made the resurrection of their countries more difficult. In contrast, the foreign policy of Dr. Beneš during the present war has won Czechoslovakia a secure future."

The leaders to whom Taylor referred were Colonel Józef Beck, the Polish foreign minister 1932–39 and a leading figure in the Sanation military dictatorship; Milan Stojadinović, who served as the prime minister of Yugoslavia 1935–39 and who followed a pro-German foreign policy; General Ion Antonescu, the Conducător (dictator) of Romania 1940–44; and Georges Bonnet, the French foreign minister 1938–39, who favored abandoning Eastern Europe to Nazi Germany. Taylor's assessment that Beneš was a man of integrity (unlike Bonnet, Antonescu, Beck and Stojadinović) and that he was leading Czechoslovakia in the right direction was widely shared in 1945.

== Honors and awards ==
Beneš was elected an International Member of the American Philosophical Society in 1939. He received awards and decorations before and after World War II.

=== National orders ===
Award or decoration	Country	Date
Czechoslovak War Cross 1918	Czechoslovakia	1919
Czechoslovak Victory Medal	Czechoslovakia	1920
Czechoslovak Revolutionary Medal	Czechoslovakia	1922
Order of the White Lion	Czechoslovakia	1936
Czechoslovak War Cross 1939–1945	Czechoslovakia	1945
Military Order of the White Lion	Czechoslovakia	1945

=== Foreign orders ===
Award or decoration	Country	Date
Order of St. Sava	Yugoslavia	1920
Order of the Star of Romania	Kingdom of Romania	1921
Légion d'honneur	France	1922
Order of the Crown of Italy	Kingdom of Italy	1921
Order of the British Empire	United Kingdom	1923
Order of Leopold	Belgium	1923
Order of the Oak Crown	Luxembourg	1923
Order of Charles III	Spain	1924
Order of Polonia Restituta	Poland	1925
Decoration of Honour for Services to the Republic of Austria	Austria	1926
Order of the Three Stars	Latvia	1927
Order of the Rising Sun	Empire of Japan	1928
Order of Muhammad Ali	Kingdom of Egypt	1928
Order of the White Eagle	Yugoslavia	1929
Order of the Lithuanian Grand Duke Gediminas	Lithuania	1929
Order of the Cross of the Eagle	Estonia	1931
Military Order of Christ	Portugal	1932
Military Order of Saint James of the Sword	Portugal	1933
Order of the Redeemer	Greece	1933
Order of the Dannebrog	Denmark	1933
Order of Saint-Charles	Monaco	1934
Order of the Spanish Republic	Spanish Republic	1935
Order of the White Elephant	Siam	1935
Order of the Aztec Eagle	Mexico	1935
Order of Karađorđe's Star	Yugoslavia	1936
Order of Brilliant Jade	China	1936
Order of Boyacá	Colombia	1937
Order of Carol I	Kingdom of Romania	1937
Order of Pahlavi	Iran	1937
Order pro Merito Melitensi	Sovereign Military Order of Malta	1938
Order of St. Olav	Norway	1945
Order of Propitious Clouds	China	1947

== See also ==
- History of Czechoslovakia
- Little Entente

== Sources ==
- Crampton, Richard (1997). Eastern Europe in the Twentieth Century. London: Routledge. ISBN 0415164230.
- Hauner, Milan (2009). "'We Must Push Eastwards!' The Challenges and Dilemmas of President Beneš after Munich". Journal of Contemporary History. 44 (4): 619–656. doi:10.1177/0022009409339435. JSTOR 40542980. S2CID 144521196.
- Heimann, Mary (2009). Czechoslovakia: The State That Failed. New Haven: Yale University Press. ISBN 978-0300172423.
- Lukes, Igor (1996). Czechoslovakia Between Stalin and Hitler: The Diplomacy of Edvard Beneš in the 1930s. Oxford University Press. ISBN 9780195102666.
- Lukes, Igor (1999). "Stalin and Czechoslovakia: An Autopsy of a Myth". In Igor Lukes; Erik Goldstein (eds.). The Munich Crisis, 1938 Prelude to World War II. London: Frank Cass. pp. 13–47. ISBN 9781136328329.
- Mastný, Vojtěch (1971). The Czechs Under Nazi Rule: The Failure of National Resistance, 1939–1942. New York: Columbia University Press. ISBN 978-0-231-03303-9.
- Neville, Peter (2010). Benes & Masaryk: Czechoslovakia. Haus Publishing. ISBN 9781905791729. JSTOR j.ctt1r6b055.
- Orzoff, Andrea (2009). The Battle for the Castle. Oxford University Press.
- Konrád, Ota; Küpper, René (2013). Edvard Beneš: Vorbild und Feindbild : politische, mediale und historiographische Deutungen (in German). Vandenhoeck & Ruprecht. ISBN 978-3-525-37302-6.
- Crampton, Richard (18 November 1999). "Central Europe Review – Book Review: The Life of Edvard Benes, 1884–1948". Ce-review.org. Archived from the original on 4 October 2009.
- Wheeler-Bennett, John (1967). The Nemesis of Power The German Army In Politics 1918-1945. London: Macmillan.
- Taylor, A.J.P. (1976). The Origins of the Second World War. London: Penguin.
- Weinberg, Gerhard (2004). A World At Arms. Cambridge: Cambridge University Press. ISBN 0521618266.
- Zeman, Zbyněk; Klimek, Antonín (1997). The Life of Edvard Beneš: Czechoslovakia in Peace and War. Oxford: Clarendon Press. ISBN 978-0-19-820583-8.
- Zinner, Paul E. (1994). "Czechoslovakia: The Diplomacy of Eduard Benes". In Gordon A. Craig and Felix Gilbert (ed.). The Diplomats, 1919–1939. Princeton, New Jersey: Princeton University Press. pp. 100–122. ISBN 978-0-691-03660-1. OCLC 31484352.

=== Primary sources ===
- Hauner, Milan, ed. Edvard Beneš’ Memoirs: The Days of Munich (vol. 1), War and Resistance (vol. 2), Documents (vol. 3). First critical edition of reconstructed War Memoirs 1938–45 of President Beneš of Czechoslovakia (published by Academia Prague 2007 ISBN 978-80-200-1529-7).

Political offices
Position established	Minister of Foreign Affairs of Czechoslovakia; 1918–1935	Succeeded by Milan Hodža
Preceded by Jan Černý	Prime Minister of Czechoslovakia; 1921–1922	Succeeded by Antonín Švehla
Preceded by Tomáš Masaryk	President of Czechoslovakia; 1935–1938	Succeeded by Emil Hácha
Preceded by Emil Hácha	President of Czechoslovakia; 1945–1948	Succeeded by Klement Gottwald
Awards and achievements
Preceded by Ferdinand Foch	Cover of Time magazine 23 March 1925	Succeeded by George Harold Sisler
