= Vojta Beneš =

Czech educator and politician (1878–1951)

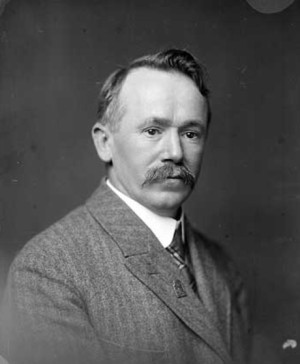
Vojta Beneš

Vojta Beneš (11 May 1878 – 20 November 1951) was a Czech educator, political leader in Czechoslovakia and brother of Edvard Beneš.

== Life and career ==
Vojta Beneš was born in Kožlany, Bohemia, then a province of the Austro-Hungarian Empire. Beneš began his professional life as an educator at various institutions, and from 1913 to 1914 visited the United States to study its school systems. Returning to the United States with his wife, Emilie, and their children in 1915, he travelled around North America to attract support for Czechoslovak independence from Austria. For this and similar activities in the US during World War II, he became known as "Czechoslovakia's Paul Revere."

He signed Pittsburgh Agreement on 30 May 1918.

After the end of Austrian rule and the establishment of the Czechoslovak republic in 1918, Vojta Beneš was active as both an educator and public servant. He worked as a provincial school inspector, and, from 1937, as the chief inspector of the national school system. A member of the Czech Social Democratic Party, he served as a deputy in the Czechoslovak parliament from 1925 to 1935, and as senator in 1935, resigning the latter post upon his brother's election to the presidency the following year. Beneš was also an official of the Czechoslovak legionary community and of the union of Czechoslovak teachers.

With the conclusion of the Munich Agreement in 1938 and the subsequent Nazi occupation of Czechoslovakia, Beneš escaped to the U.S., where he began campaigning again for Czechoslovak freedom after nearly twenty-five years.

After the liberation of Czechoslovakia by Allied forces in 1945, Vojta Beneš returned to public life in his country, serving from 1946 to 1948 in the Constituent National Assembly. Following the Communist Party coup in 1948, Beneš, with the support of his daughter in Illinois, returned for the third and final time to North America with the help of the U.S. State Department. He died in South Bend, Indiana, in 1951. His remains were eventually returned to Czechoslovakia and interred in a cemetery in Prague.

== Writing ==
He was the author of a number of works, including the war-time books The Mission of a Small Nation and Ten Million Prisoners, an illustrated volume of poetry for children, Naše Maminka (Our Mother), and others.

== Family ==
Vojta Beneš and his wife Emilie had four children, three daughters and a son. His oldest daughter, Hana Klenková (née Benešová) was a writer and novelist in former Czechoslovakia. His son Václav was professor of political science at Indiana University and father of Eva Beneš Hanhardt, a city planner in New York City, and Nina Hajda, an author based in Manhattan, Kansas. Emilie Benes Brzezinski, a sculptor and wife of Zbigniew Brzezinski, is his grandniece; her father, Bohuš, a Czechoslovak diplomat, was the nephew of Vojta and Edvard.

== See also ==
- History of Czechoslovakia
