= James Lonsdale =

James Lonsdale may refer to:

- James Lonsdale (Irish politician) (1865–1921), Unionist member of the British Parliament from Ireland
- James Lonsdale (painter) (1777–1839), fashionable and prolific English portrait painter
- James John Lonsdale (1810–1886), English judge, writer and secretary to the Criminal Law Commission
- James Lowther, 1st Earl of Lonsdale (1736–1802), member of the British Parliament from various places in England
- James Lowther, 7th Earl of Lonsdale (1922–2006), British peer

== See also ==
- James Lonsdale-Bryans (1893–1981), writer, British amateur diplomat and Nazi sympathiser
