= Kožlany =

- Town
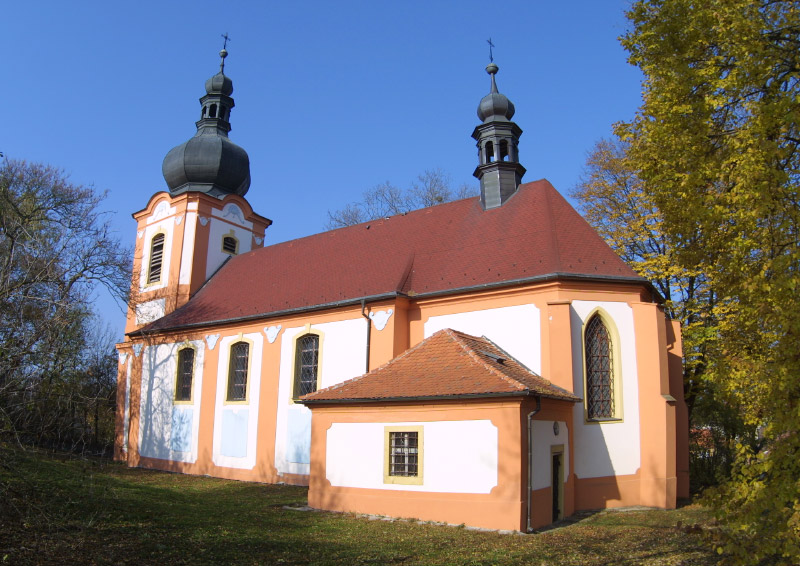
- Church of Saint Lawrence

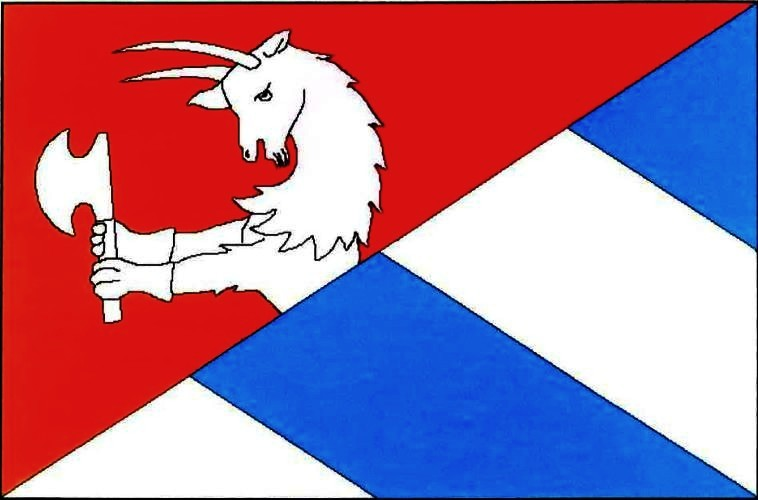
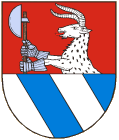
- Flag Coat of arms

- Location in the Czech Republic
- Coordinates: 49°59′35″N 13°32′10″E
- Country: Czech Republic
- Region: Plzeň
- District: Plzeň-North
- First mentioned: 1238

Government
  - Mayor: Václav Kratochvíl

Area
  - Total: 29.10 km^{2} (11.24 sq mi)
- Elevation: 442 m (1,450 ft)

Population (2026-01-01)
  - Total: 1,520
  - Density: 52.2/km^{2} (135/sq mi)
- Time zone: UTC+1 (CET)
  - Summer (DST): UTC+2 (CEST)
- Postal code: 331 44
- Website: www.kozlany.cz

Kožlany (Czech pronunciation: [ˈkoʒlanɪ]) is a town in Plzeň-North District in the Plzeň Region of the Czech Republic. It has about 1,500 inhabitants.

== Administrative division ==
Kožlany consists of five municipal parts (in brackets population according to the 2021 census):

- Kožlany (1,149)
- Buček (57)
- Dřevec (128)
- Hedčany (38)
- Hodyně (89)

== Etymology ==
Until the end of the 16th century, the town's name was written as Kozlany. The name was derived from the personal name Kozel.

== Geography ==
Kožlany is located about 28 kilometres (17 mi) northeast of Plzeň. It lies in the Plasy Uplands. The highest point is at 481 m (1,578 ft) above sea level. The Javornice Stream flows along the northern municipal border.

== History ==
Kožlany was probably founded during the reign of King Ottokar I between 1200 and 1230. The first written mention of Kožlany is from 1238, when King Wenceslaus I took the settlement from the monastery in Plasy and gave the monastery the village of Žihle. In 1351, it was promoted to a town by King Charles IV. King George of Poděbrady donated Kožlany to Jošt of Gusidle, and since then the town has been owned by various lesser nobles.

The development of Kožlany was stopped by the Thirty Years' War. Even in the following decades, the town was plagued by troop movements, crop failures and high taxes. The town was then damaged by fires in 1768, 1773 and 1789.

== Demographics ==
Historical population

| Year | Pop. | ±% |
|---|---|---|
| 1869 | 2,472 | — |
| 1880 | 2,449 | −0.9% |
| 1890 | 2,588 | +5.7% |
| 1900 | 2,592 | +0.2% |
| 1910 | 2,269 | −12.5% |

| Year | Pop. | ±% |
|---|---|---|
| 1921 | 2,230 | −1.7% |
| 1930 | 2,013 | −9.7% |
| 1950 | 1,411 | −29.9% |
| 1961 | 1,400 | −0.8% |
| 1970 | 1,246 | −11.0% |

| Year | Pop. | ±% |
|---|---|---|
| 1980 | 1,392 | +11.7% |
| 1991 | 1,416 | +1.7% |
| 2001 | 1,406 | −0.7% |
| 2011 | 1,463 | +4.1% |
| 2021 | 1,461 | −0.1% |

Source: Censuses

== Transport ==
Kožlany is located the railway line Prague–Kralovice via Rakovník. Historic trains run on it and it is only in operation during the summer tourist season on weekends.

== Sights ==
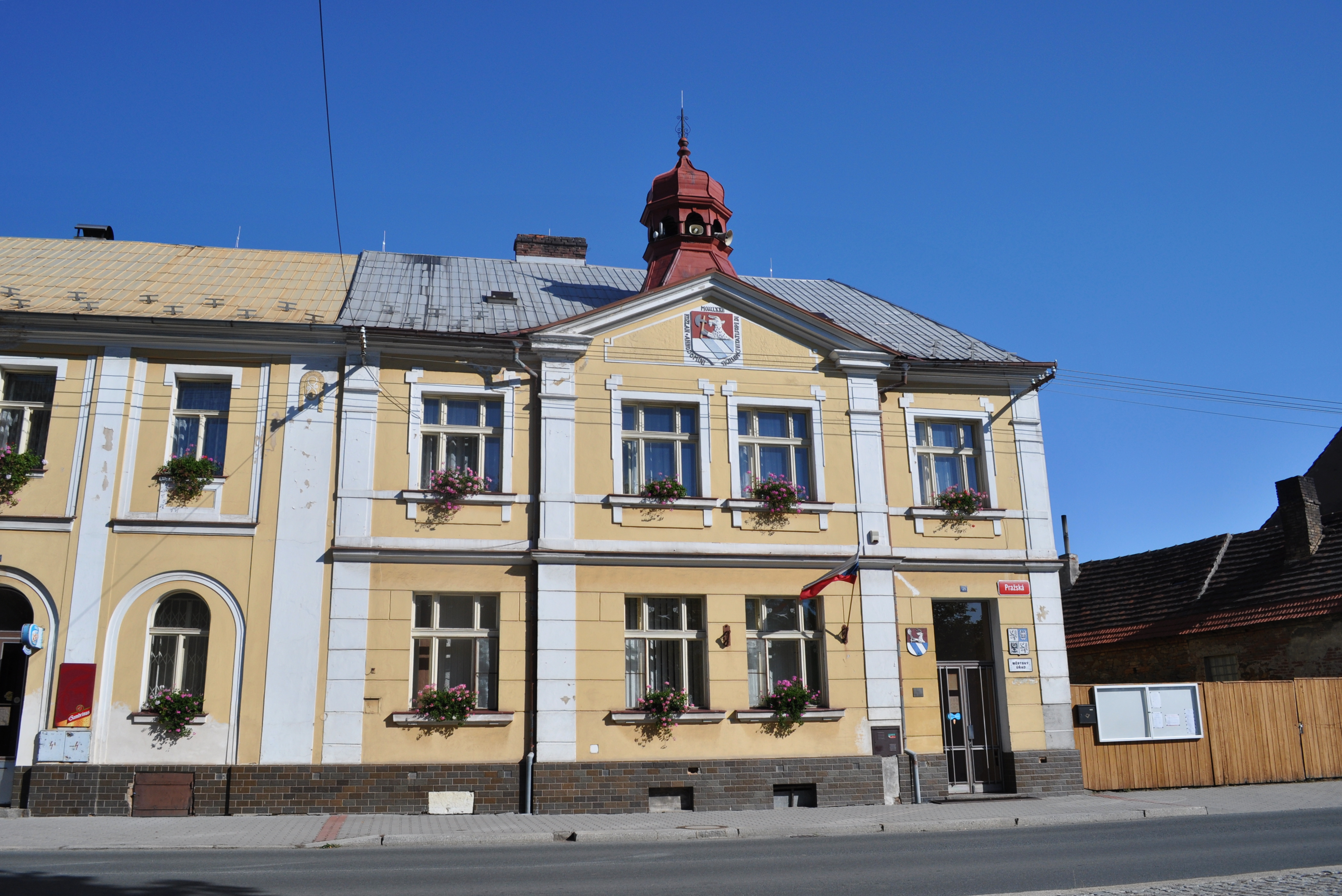
Town hall

The most important monument is the Church of Saint Lawrence. Originally a medieval church from the end of the 13th century, it was rebuilt in the Baroque style in 1769, after it was damaged by a fire.

The town hall dates from the 18th century. Originally a Baroque house, it has an Art Nouveau façade from 1911.

There is Jewish cemetery in the town, established between 1680 and 1700. In the cemetery are preserved gravestones from the 17th and 18th centuries.

The former school houses the town museum. The museum includes an exposition on life of Edvard Beneš, who is the most famous native. The museum was founded in 1946. The birth house of Edvard Beneš is protected as a cultural monument.

== Notable people ==
- Edvard Beneš (1884–1948), politician, the second president of Czechoslovakia
