= Igor Lukes =

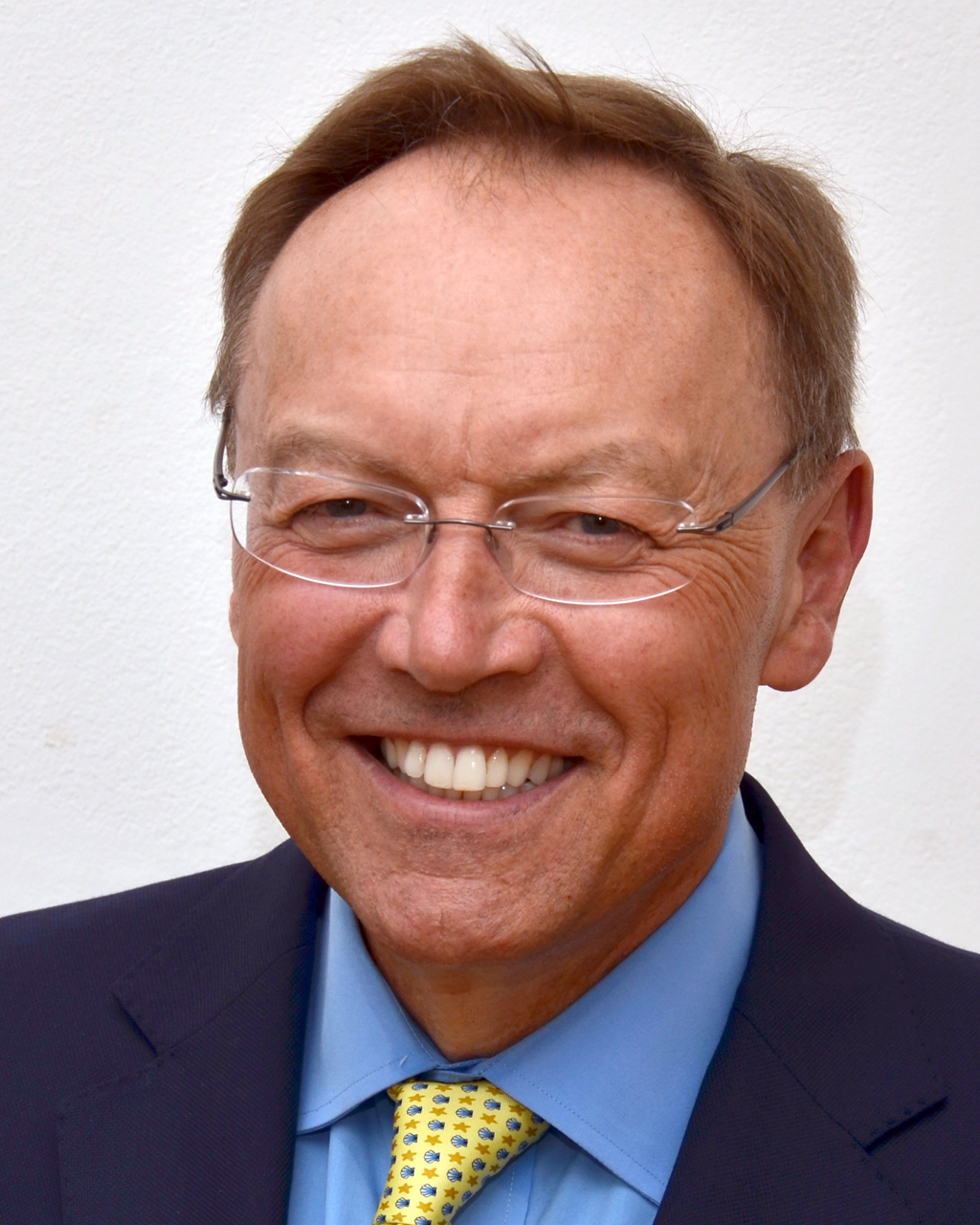
Igor Lukes in 2017

Igor Lukes (born 1950) is a professor of history at Boston University, who focuses on central European history since World War I. He is also an Honorary Consul General of the Czech Republic.

== Works ==
- Lukes, Igor (1996). Czechoslovakia Between Stalin and Hitler: The Diplomacy of Edvard Beneš in the 1930s. Oxford University Press. ISBN 978-0-19-510266-6.
- The Munich Crisis, 1938: Prelude to World War II. Psychology Press. 1999.
- Lukes, Igor (2012). On the Edge of the Cold War: American Diplomats and Spies in Postwar Prague. Oxford University Press. ISBN 978-0-19-993914-5.
