= Ulrich von Hassell =

German diplomat and resistance member (1881–1944)

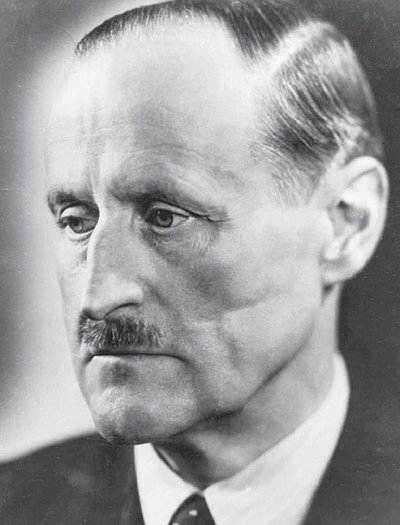
- Born: 12 November 1881; Anklam, Mecklenburg-Vorpommern, German Empire
- Died: 8 September 1944 (aged 62); Plötzensee Prison, Berlin, Nazi Germany
- Cause of death: Execution by hanging
- Occupation: Diplomat
- Political party: German Fatherland Party (1917–1918); German National People's Party (1918–1933); Nazi Party (1933–1944)

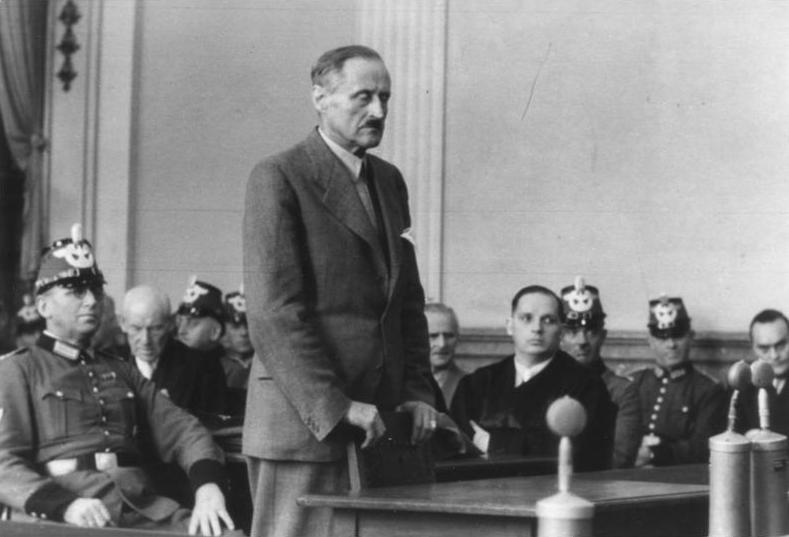
Ulrich von Hassell in front of the Nazi Volksgerichtshof, which condemned him to death in September 1944

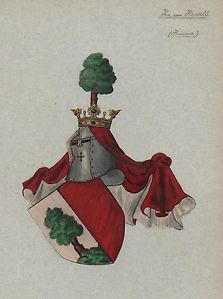
Coat of arms von Hassell c. 15th century

Christian August Ulrich von Hassell (12 November 1881 – 8 September 1944) was a German diplomat during World War II. A member of the German Resistance against German dictator Adolf Hitler, Hassell unsuccessfully proposed to the British that the resistance would overthrow Hitler if Germany kept large swaths of annexed territory, such as Austria, the Sudetenland and Germany's 1914 border with Poland. He was executed in the aftermath of the failed 20 July plot.

== Family ==
Von Hassell was descended from ancient landed nobility, born the son of First Lieutenant Ulrich von Hassell and Margarete (née von Stosch). His mother was a niece of Albrecht von Stosch, the Prussian Minister of State and chief of the Admiralität. She was furthermore the great-granddaughter of Henriette Vogel, whom Heinrich von Kleist had accompanied in November 1811 in suicide. Ulrich von Hassell later did not exclude that his ever-growing admiration for the writer had been increased by that fact. His maternal grandfather was the godson of count August Neidhardt von Gneisenau. This explains the special interest of Hassell in the Prussian reformer, which found its expression in some publications and elsewhere. His paternal grandfather, Christian von Hassell, born in 1805, chose a lawyer's career, an exception in their old Hanoverian family. Their members had exclusively been landowners or had taken a career in the military.

Hassell is the father of Wolf Ulrich von Hassell, who helped the German resistance to Hitler during World War II. As ambassador and deputy head of mission to the United Nations from 1971 to 1978, he oversaw the Federal Republic of Germany regaining its status from observer to full member. His previous diplomatic postings were in the Foreign Office in Bonn, in Belgium and in Italy. He also had a daughter Fey who was 12 years old when he took up his post in Rome. Between 1933 and 1937, she noted her father‘s reaction to the rise of Nazism and the negative feelings he was unwilling to commit to paper, but which he confided to his family in a diary she kept.

He is also the grandfather of Agostino von Hassell, a noted author on military and war history; and of Corrado Pirzio-Biroli, former civil servant of the European Commission and ambassador of the EU to Austria during the 1994 Austrian European Union membership referendum.

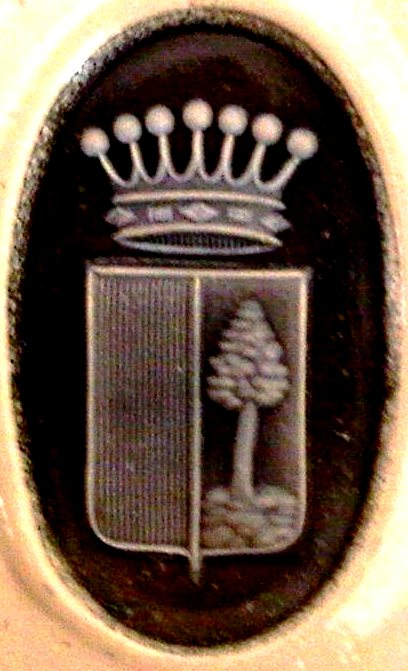
coat of arms of the von Hassell family

== Early life ==
Hassell was born in Anklam, Province of Pomerania, to First Lieutenant Ulrich von Hassell and his wife Margarete. Hassell passed his Abitur at Prinz-Heinrich-Gymnasium in 1899. Between 1899 and 1903, he studied law and economics at the University of Lausanne, the University of Tübingen and in Berlin. He was active in the Corps Suevia Tübingen (a Studentenverbindung). After spending some time in Qingdao (then known as the German colony of "Tsingtao") and London, he began in 1909 to work as a graduate civil servant (Assessor) in the Foreign Office.

In 1911, Hassell married Ilse von Tirpitz, Grand Admiral Alfred von Tirpitz's daughter. The couple would have four children. That year, he was named Vice-Consul in Genoa.

== World War I ==
In the First World War, Hassell was wounded in the chest in the First Battle of the Marne on 8 September 1914. Later in the war, he worked as Alfred von Tirpitz's advisor and private secretary. He later wrote his father-in-law's biography.

After the war ended in 1918, Hassell joined the nationalist German National People's Party (Deutschnationale Volkspartei or DNVP). In the years that followed, he returned to the Foreign Office and worked until the early 1930s in Rome, Barcelona, Copenhagen, and Belgrade. In 1932, Hassell was made Germany's ambassador to the Kingdom of Italy.

In 1933, Hassell joined the Nazi Party. He was strongly against the Anti-Comintern Pact concluded by Nazi Germany, Fascist Italy and the Empire of Japan in 1937 and favoured instead Western-Christian unity in Europe (he was, in fact, a member of the Order of Saint John, a German Protestant noblemen's association, to which he had been admitted as a Knight of Honor in 1925 and he had been promoted to Knight of Justice in 1933). In 1938, as a result of the Blomberg-Fritsch Affair, Hassell was recalled from his posting as ambassador in Rome by Adolf Hitler but without being cast out of the diplomatic service. Soon after the German attack on Poland on 1 September 1939, Hassell led a delegation to allay Northern European governments' fears of a forthcoming German strike on their countries.

== World War II ==
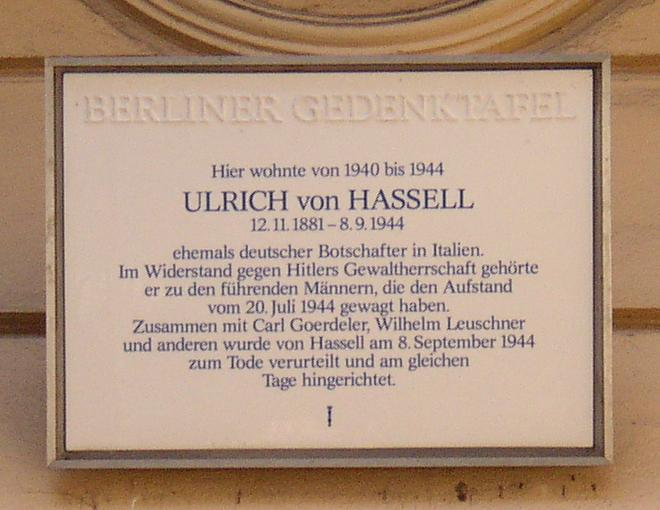
Memorial plaque for Ulrich von Hassell where he lived in Berlin-Charlottenburg.

After the outbreak of the Second World War, Hassell took part in plans to overthrow Hitler. Hassell's main function was to be a liaison between the conservative opposition groups centred about Carl Friedrich Goerdeler and Ludwig Beck (Hassell once ironically called this group "His Majesty's most loyal opposition", using the English term) and the younger Kreisau Circle.

In 1940, Hassell met the amateur diplomat James Lonsdale-Bryans to discuss a possible pact between Germany and the British Empire. Lonsdale-Bryans proposed that Germany would be allowed control of Europe, and Britain would control the rest of the world. Over the next few years, Hassell used his position in the executive committee of the Central European Economic Congress to discuss with Allied officials what might happen after a possible coup d'état in Germany. He envisaged himself, along with Beck and Johannes Popitz, planning for Germany's post-Hitler internal organization after a successful coup.

Journal reports by Hassell show that he had specific knowledge of the Holocaust by spring 1943. He denounced the mass gassings as "unimaginably shameful".

Depending on the source, either he or the former ambassador to the Soviet Union, Friedrich Werner von der Schulenburg, would have become Foreign Minister in the foreseen transitional government. Hassell's offer in 1940 was based on the condition that Britain would let Germany keep almost all of the Nazis' territorial gains in Europe, including Austria, the Sudetenland and Poland. The British saw no reason to agree to a treaty that would be entirely beneficial for Germany alone.

However, on 29 July 1944, Hassell was arrested by the Gestapo for his involvement in the 20 July plot, something that he had foreseen. On 8 September, after a two-day trial at the German People's Court (Volksgerichtshof), over which Roland Freisler presided, he was sentenced to death and executed the same day at Plötzensee Prison in Berlin.

== Awards and decorations ==
- Order of St Alexander, 1st class (Bulgaria)
- Order of the Rising Sun, 1st class (Japan)
- Knight Grand Cordon of the Order of Saints Maurice and Lazarus (Italy)
- Knight Grand Cordon of the Order of the Yugoslav Crown
- Knight Grand Cross of the Order of the Dannebrog (Denmark)
- Knight Commander of the Order of Isabella the Catholic (Spain)
- Order of the Double Dragon, 3rd class, 1st grade (China)
- Order of Osmanieh (Ottoman Empire)
- Knight of Justice of the Order of Saint John

== Writings ==
- The Von Hassell Diaries 1938–1944: The Story of the Forces Against Hitler Inside Germany, Ambassador Ulrich von Hassell, (Doubleday & Company, 1947, ASIN B000VB0W42), (Hamish Hamilton, 1948, ASIN B0014X98FU) (Greenwood Press, 1971, ISBN 978-0-8371-3228-0)

== See also ==
- List of members of the 20 July plot
