= R. J. Crampton =

British academic

Richard J. Crampton (born 23 November 1940) is a British professor emeritus of History.

== Biography ==
Crampton studied at Trinity College Dublin, gained B.A. at the University of Oxford; M.A. at the University of London; Ph.D. at the University of Kent at Canterbury. He was lecturer, (1967–78); senior lecturer, (1978-88); professor of East European history, (1988–90) at the University of Oxford, lecturer in history, (1990-1996), Fellow of St. Edmund Hall Oxford, 1990—, professor of East European history, (1996—2017). Crampton's writing has focused on Bulgarian and the Balkan history. With his writings about Bulgaria, Crampton has created important English-language resources on Balkan history. While Crampton has a special interest in East European history, his histories of Bulgaria are especially useful. His works also research the recent history of the Balkan states.

== Publications ==
- The Hollow Détente: Anglo-German Relations in the Balkans, 1911–1914, Humanities Press (Atlantic Highlands, NJ), 1981.
- Bulgaria, 1878–1918: A History, East European Monographs (New York, NY), 1983.
- A Short History of Modern Bulgaria. Cambridge, London, New York, New Rochelle, Melbourne, Sydney: Cambridge University Press. 1987. ISBN 9780521253406 – via Internet Archive.
- (Compiler) Bulgaria (bibliography), Clio (Santa Barbara, CA), 1989.
- Eastern Europe in the Twentieth Century, Routledge (New York, NY), 1994, 2nd edition published as Eastern Europe in the Twentieth Century - and After. London and New York: Routledge. 1997. ISBN 9780415164238 – via Internet Archive.
- (With Benjamin Crampton) Atlas of Eastern Europe in the Twentieth Century, Routledge (New York, NY), 1996.
- A Concise History of Bulgaria (2nd ed.). Cambridge, New York, NY, Melbourne, Madrid, Cape Town, Singapore, São Paulo: Cambridge University Press. 2005.
- The Balkans since the Second World War, Longman (New York, NY), 2002.
- The Oxford History of Modern Europe: Bulgaria. Oxford: Oxford University Press. 2007.
