= James Lonsdale-Bryans =

British writer, amateur diplomat and Nazi sympathiser

Personal details
- Born: 10 May 1893
- Died: 1981

James Lonsdale-Bryans (1893–1981) was a British writer, amateur diplomat and Nazi sympathiser. Between September 1939 and February 1940, he sought a peace agreement with Nazi Germany. His efforts were supported and financed by Lord Brocket and the Duke of Buccleuch.

== Family ==
He was the eldest child of stained-glass artist Herbert William Bryans and his wife, Louisa Bryans, née Richardson.

By 1901, the family lived at Regent's Park, London.

He was educated at Eton College.

== Attempts at diplomacy ==
=== Background ===
Ulrich von Hassell, a German diplomat who served as ambassador to Italy from 1932 to 1938, had emerged as one of the leaders of the conservative opposition to the Nazi regime. During the Phoney War, Hassell sought an "assurance" from Britain that an "honorable peace" would be obtainable for a post-Nazi German government. Lonsdale-Bryans, described to Hassell as "an English associate of Lord Halifax", was prominent in the high society of Rome and had let it be known that he was willing to serve as an amateur diplomat. Lonsdale-Bryans had moved to Rome in October 1939 and, in November 1939 first met Count Detalmo Biroli. In his 1951 book The Blind Victory, Lonsdale-Bryans wrote of his "self-appointed mission" as "winning the peace" and "saving millions of lives", but the German historian Gregor Schöllgen described Lonsdale-Bryans's real motives as seeking fame and money via his "often eccentric" attempts at playing diplomat.

British Prime Minister Neville Chamberlain had invested much hope that German conservatives would persuade the Wehrmacht to overthrow Hitler before the fighting started in Western Europe.

Biroli was an Italian aristocrat who knew Lonsdale-Bryans through several mutual friends in Rome and had married Hassell's daughter, Fey, in 1939. On 28 December 1939, Biroli gave Lonsdale-Bryans an unsigned letter of the "peace terms" sought by the conservative opposition in Germany. After meeting Biroli and his wife Fey at least 40 times, in January 1940, Lonsdale-Bryans went to London to meet Lord Halifax. Initially, Halifax refused to see him, but Lonsdale-Bryans's patron, Lord Brocket, was able to arrange a meeting at the Foreign Office on 8 January 1940. It was agreed that Lonsdale-Bryans would meet Hassell and carry a written message from him back to London. Halifax agreed to the mission if that his name was not mentioned, and he instructed Sir Percy Loraine, the British ambassador in Rome, to assist Lonsdale-Bryans, but in the same cable, Halifax wrote that Lonsdale-Bryans "is clearly a lightweight and has, not of course, been sent on any mission by me".

=== Meeting with Hassell ===
Upon returning to Rome, he contacted Biroli to set up a meeting with Hassell, which turned out to be difficult since Hassell was paranoid that the Gestapo and/or the OVRA would be following him if he met Lonsdale-Bryans in Rome. In 1940, Lonsdale-Bryans travelled to Switzerland to meet Hassell, the former German ambassador to Italy. On 22 February 1940, Lonsdale-Bryans met Hassell in Arosa. Halifax had claimed that Longsdale-Bryans was not a representative of the British government, but Lonsdale-Bryans introduced himself to Hassell as the "English Envoy Extraordinary (if not plenipotentiary) of the First Secretary of State for Foreign Affairs for His Britannic Majesty". Hassell believed that Lonsdale-Bryans had more authority than in reality.

Hassell refused to name for whom he was speaking but promised that any message from Halifax would reach the "right people" in Germany. Hassell told Lonsdale-Bryans that much of the Wehrmacht's Generalität was willing to revolt against Hitler if Britain would make "assurances" for an "honorable peace". Hassell also said that Britain should not publicly call for Hitler's overthrow and that it was imperative for the call for a "change of regime" in Germany not to be seen to come from "non-German sources". Hassell argued that most Germans still remembered what had happened in 1918, when US President Woodrow Wilson made it clear that the United States would never sign an armistice with the Kaiser, Wilhelm II, which led to what Hassell called the terrible situation in Germany "after the Kaiser was sacrificed". A conservative monarchist, Hassell stated the restoration of the monarchy in Germany was "very desirable, but only a question at the secondary stage".

Much of what Hassell had to say concerned his fear that "a Bolshevistion of Europe is rapidly growing". He cited the Soviet aggression against Poland, the Baltic states and Finland to such an extent that Lonsdale-Bryans believed that Hassell feared the communists more much than the Nazis.

Hassell gave Lonsdale-Bryans a letter in English that stated "assurances" that he sought. The terms that Hassell wanted for "a permanent pacification and re-establishment of Europe on a solid basis and a security against a renewal of war-like tendencies" called for the Reich to keep Austria and the Sudetenland and for the German-Polish border to be "more or less identical with the German frontier of 1914". Hassell was willing to accept the restoration of Polish and Czech independence but made it clear that he viewed Eastern Europe as Germany's exclusive sphere of influence. However, he was willing to accept Alsace-Lorraine remaining part of France.

The rest of Hassell's letter contained a number of generalities about how after Hitler was overthrown, Europe should be guided by leaders who were committed to Christian values and would uphold human rights and social welfare.

Lonsdale-Bryans's idea was "that the world ought to be divided into two parts. That Germany should be given a free hand in Europe and that the British Empire should run the rest of the world".

=== Later attempts ===
Upon his return to Britain, the Foreign Office first learned that Lonsdale-Bryans expected generous financial compensation for his work. On 17 March 1940, Lonsdale-Bryan's patron, Lord Brocket, wrote to Alexander Cadogan, the Permanent Undersecretary at the Foreign Office, to explain that Lonsdale-Bryans was deeply in debt and had a massive bank overdraft and so wanted lavish financial rewards for his work as an amateur diplomat. Cadogan wrote on the margin next to the part in Lord Brocket's letter about Lonsdale-Bryans's need for money "enlightening". The American historian Gerhard Weinberg called Lonsdale-Bryans a "rather dubious character", whose actions were motivated entirely by greed.

Lonsdale-Bryans also met with Chamberlain and Halifax, both of whom were sympathetic to Hassell but not Lonsdale-Bryans.

Halifax made it clear he wanted a professional diplomat to deal with Hassell and told Lonsdale-Bryans that he already sent "assurances" to Hassell via "another channel". Nonetheless, Lonsdale-Bryans returned to Arosa to meet Hassell again on 14 April 1940 but offered little more than words of encouragement. The fact that fighting had begun five days earlier with the German invasion of Norway led the British historian Sir John Wheeler-Bennett to note "the discussion of a negotiated peace was purely academic" by now; despite Hassell's claims that the Wehrmacht generals were deeply opposed to Hitler, they were fighting fiercely against British, French and Polish troops in Norway.

Lonsdale-Bryans then returned to Italy, where he continued his amateur diplomatic work until June 1940, when Italy entered the war. Then, he moved to Portugal, where he continued on much as he done in Italy. Lonsdale-Bryans "wrote to the then Foreign Secretary Lord Halifax with his plans.... MI5 was unsure as to how much backing Mr Lonsdale-Bryans had from Lord Halifax". A handwritten note by the MI5 stated: "He went to Italy with the knowledge of the Foreign Office in order to develop his contacts. He greatly exceeded his instructions".

In October 1940, Lonsdale-Bryans continued his amateur diplomatic work by trying to set up a meeting with Hitler in Switzerland to discuss peace terms. Lonsdale-Bryans sent a letter from Portugal to the director of the Schwarzhäupter publishing house in Leipzig, Germany, which had agreed to translate his book The Curve of Fate into German before the war. He wrote that he willing to meet Hitler in Switzerland to discuss Anglo-German peace terms and again demanded generous monetary rewards.

In January 1941, the Foreign Office sent a message to the British embassy in Lisbon, Portugal, to find a way to ensure that "this undesirable and untrustworthy individual" would return to Britain at once before he did something that would cause Britain much embarrassment. Lonsdale-Bryans finally returned to Britain in 1941, much to the relief of the Foreign Office.

British officials had a low opinion of Lonsdale-Bryans. On 11 February 1941, Cadogan called Lonsdale-Bryans in a memo "an idiot and something of a crook".

A 1941 letter from an official in the Foreign Office stated, "Although there seems to be a good deal to be said for locking him up to prevent him airing his views to all and sundry, I understand that if this is done it will inevitably involve his bringing up the question of his contacts with the Foreign Office and the facilities afforded him to go to Italy". Another memo described Lonsdale-Bryans as "a talkative and indiscreet fellow who is in possession of a story which he delights in telling and which if told publicly would be likely to cause embarrassment to the Foreign Office". Until 1943, Lonsdale-Bryans continued to seek money from the Foreign Office despite its statements that it wanted nothing to do with him.

Lonsdale-Bryans was on friendly terms with powerful members of the British aristocracy, including the Duke of Buccleuch and Lord Brocket, who also were Nazi sympathizers.

When Winston Churchill succeeded Chamberlain as Prime Minister, Lord Halifax remained as Foreign Secretary until, in January 1941, he became the British ambassador to the United States. Lonsdale-Bryans's political influence then disappeared. However, Lonsdale-Bryans "tried to discuss his plans with senior American officials, including Dwight D. Eisenhower", and British General Bernard Montgomery. That caused the British government to assure the Americans that Lonsdale-Bryans was "unreliable, though not disloyal". As late as 20 September 1943, Lonsdale-Bryans was able to see Cadogan's private secretary to ask for a meeting with Cadogan, who stated in reply that the permanent undersecretary did not wish to see him and warned him that if continued with his unauthorised contacts with "German nationals", he was leaving himself open to prosecution for treason since his work was not in "the national interest".

== Personal life ==
Lonsdale-Bryans was homosexual. In the 1930s, he maintained a relationship with a baronet and lived in London and an Italian country estate.

In 1941, he published The Curve of Fate and in 1951 The Blind Victory: Secret communications, Halifax-Hassell, which recounted his wartime career. A number of references to him feature in the memoirs of the travel writer Robin Bryans (Robert Harbinson).

Suffering from osteoporosis and dementia, he died aged 87.

Lonsdale-Bryans was a contemporary at Eton of Evan Morgan, 2nd Viscount Tredegar (1893–1949).

== Sources ==
- Schollgen, Gregor (1991). A conservative against Hitler : Ulrich von Hassell : diplomat in Imperial Germany, the Weimer Republic and the Third Reich, 1881-1944. Berlin: Springer. ISBN 1349217573.
- Weinberg, Gerhard L. (2004). A world at arms : a global history of World War II. Cambridge: Cambridge University Press. ISBN 978-0-521-61826-7.
- Wheeler-Bennett, John (1967). The Nemesis of Power The German Army In Politics 1918-1945. London: Macmillan.
