= Vojtech Mastny =

Vojtech Mastny may refer to:

- Vojtěch Mastný (1874–1954), Czechoslovak diplomat
- Vojtech Mastny (historian) (born 1936), American historian

== See also ==
- Vojtech Masný (born 1938), Slovak football player
- Mastny (disambiguation)
