= Jan Viktor Mládek =

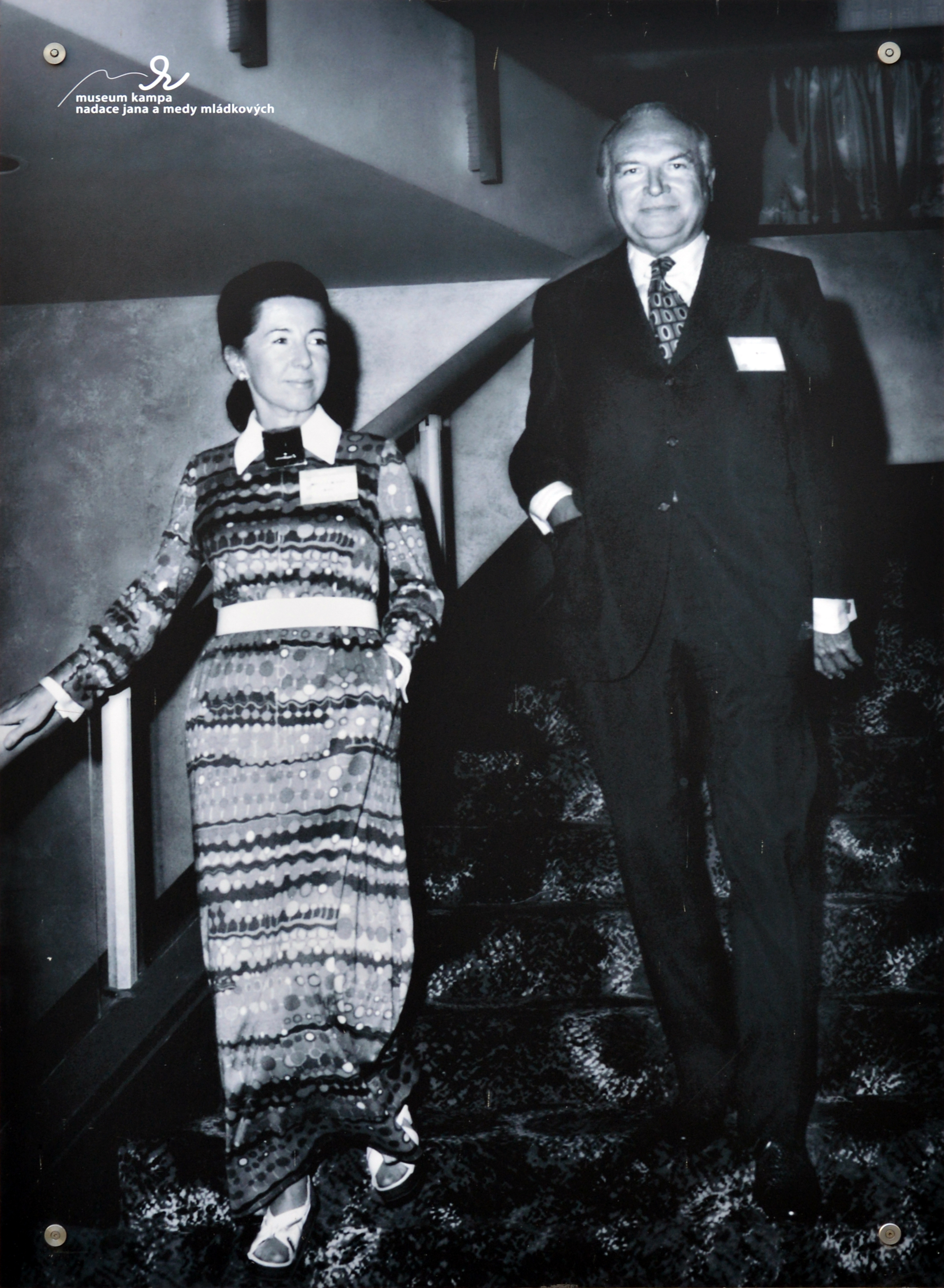
- Meda and Jan Mládek, Museum Kampa
- Born: 7 December 1911; Bochnia, Poland
- Died: 7 August 1989 (aged 77); Washington, D.C., United States
- Education: Faculty of Law, Masaryk University, Sorbonne University, University of Cambridge
- Occupation(s): economist, banker, executive director of International Monetary Fund, art collector
- Spouse: Meda Mládková
- Awards: Medal of Merit

Jan Viktor Mládek (7 December 1911 – 7 August 1989) was initially a Czechoslovak, then an American economist of Polish-Czech origin, governor and one of the executive directors of the International Monetary Fund, art collector and patron of Central European art.

== Life ==
=== 1911–1948 ===
Jan Viktor Mládek was born into a Czech-Polish family in what was then Austrian-Hungarian Galicia. After the establishment of Czechoslovakia, the family moved to Prague.

After graduating from the Smíchov real gymnasium (now Gymnázium Na Zatlance) he began studying law in Prague and completed his studies at the Faculty of Law of Masaryk University in Brno, where he obtained his doctorate in law in 1936. He also completed two semesters of medicine, but his deeper interest in economics and philosophy led him to the University of Economics in Prague. He worked briefly in the research department of the National Bank and before the war he left to study with Henri Bergson at the Sorbonne in Paris. In England, he studied at Cambridge University under Bertrand Russell and John M. Keynes, with whom he later worked closely during the war on plans for the post-war financial reconstruction and stabilization of European countries.

The outbreak of World War II found Mládek in France, where he enlisted in the French Army as artillery officer. After its defeat and evacuation to England, he was assigned to the Czechoslovak Ministry of Finance in exile in London. Its finance minister, Ladislav Feierabend, tried to persuade the president in exile, Edvard Beneš, to establish a Czechoslovak National Bank in exile, but he was unsuccessful. Beneš objected to the proposed members, people associated with the economic system of the First Republic – such as Antonín Basch, a staunch advocate of liberal economics and professor at the University of Chicago – but above all, he supported a change in the economic system after the end of the war and envisaged a greater role for the state.

Feierabend therefore established only a monetary and banking department within the Ministry of Finance, which he entrusted to Mládek. After the war, Jan Mládek returned to Czechoslovakia and was entrusted with the temporary administration of the Czech National Bank.

Jan V. Mládek, together with Antonín Basch, participated in consultations in the United States in 1943 and 1944, actively working on preparations for the post-war monetary system. They also took part in the preparatory conference in Atlantic City in June 1944, where they represented Czechoslovakia as one of 17 participating countries and where the groundwork was laid for the final monetary and financial conference in July 1944 in Bretton Woods.

In Bretton Woods, Czechoslovakia was represented by Chairman Ladislav Karel Feierabend, Vice-Chairman Jan V. Mládek, professors of national economy Antonín Basch and Ervin Exner, and the head of the economic service of the Czechoslovak Embassy in the United States, Josef Hanč.

The conference approved the statutes of the International Monetary Fund and the International Bank for Reconstruction and Development and concluded the Bretton Woods Agreements. Czechoslovakia formally acceded to them at a meeting of the Interim National Assembly on 18 December 1945, by approving a government bill on the accession of the Czechoslovak Republic to the agreements on the International Monetary Fund and the International Bank for Reconstruction and Development, after its unanimous adoption by the Chamber's Budget Committee.

The Czechoslovak government signed the IMF agreement (Articles of Agreement of the IMF) with the first group of countries on 27 December 1945, making Czechoslovakia a founding member. Among the twelve executive directors of the IMF, Czechoslovak representative Jan Viktor Mládek, who was then head of the currency and banking division of the Czechoslovak Ministry of Finance, was elected in the first elections on 6 May 1946. As governor of IMF (Fund Committee on Rules and Regulations), Mládek represented the interests not only of Czechoslovakia, but also of Poland and Yugoslavia. In the US, at the request of President Beneš, he also worked on the adoption of the Marshall Plan. From 1947, Jan Viktor Mládek represented Czechoslovakia also in the United Nations.

=== 1948–1989 ===
After the 1948 Czechoslovak coup d'état, Mládek resigned from his position as executive director, requested asylum in United States, and was appointed deputy director of the IMF's Operations Department. At the request of General McArthur, he was sent to Japan to resolve financial problems there and to Yugoslavia to wean its finances off dependence on the Soviet Union. From 1953 to 1959, he was director of the European office and, from 1961, of the newly established African Department. At the request of US President Lyndon B. Johnson, he helped resolve the financial and monetary problems of Southeast Asian countries. From 1964, he headed the IMF's Central Banking Service.

In 1955 in Paris, he met Meda Sokolová when she came to ask him for a financial contribution for her publishing house. Shortly thereafter, she divorced her husband, Belgian nobleman Remi Antoine Joseph de Mûelenaer. In 1956 Meda began studying fine arts at L’École du Louvre at the Sorbonne. In the same year, she met František Kupka, who was brought to her attention by Mládek's friend, the famous Parisian antiquarian Jacques Kugel.

In 1960, Jan Mládek was called back to the headquarters of the International Monetary Fund in Washington, D.C. and Meda followed him there to marry him. In Washington D.C., she studied American literature and art at George Washington University and later at the prestigious Johns Hopkins University in Baltimore. Together with her husband, she began building an art collection, the quality of which soon became widely known thanks to the numerous visitors to the Mládek's home. Their friends and acquaintances included the Peroutkas and the Brzezinskis, Henry Kissinger, George Soros and Madeleine Albright. Meda Mládková began running a social salon, to which she invited artists according to her taste. The Mládek´s did not hesitate to make personal sacrifices to acquire certain works. In order to purchase one of František Kupka's key work, Cathedral, they sold their house in Georgetown.

In 1969, Meda Mládková organized an exhibition of Czechoslovak art in Washington, D.C. The works were purchased by Jan Viktor Mládek for his office and for the International Monetary Fund. The Mládek couple built up an extensive art collection, which they presented in 1987 at the exhibition "Expressiv: Central European Art since 1960" at the Hirshhorn Museum and Sculpture Garden, part of the Smithsonian Institution in Washington, D.C. A little later, the collection became the basis of their private Foundation and the Museum Kampa.

Jan Mládek found it difficult to accept that he was helping many countries around the world but could not help his own homeland. He lectured on Czechoslovakia before a US Congressional committee and supported Czech exiles such as Ladislav Karel Feierabend and Ferdinand Peroutka. From 1970 to 1972, he chaired the exile Society for Science and Art (SVU). In 1975, Meda Mládková was engaged in an exhibition of František Kupka's work at the Solomon R. Guggenheim Museum in New York and Stanislav Kolíbal at the Livingstone-Clermont Gallery, and accompanied Jan Mládek on his first trip to Czechoslovakia since emigrating in 1948.

After retiring in 1977, he worked intensively on plans to rebuild the Czechoslovak economy, but died on 7 August 1989, just before the fall of communist regime in November 1989.

In 1995, Dr. Jan V. Mládek was awarded the Medal of Merit, First Class, in memoriam.

== Bibliography ==
- Jan V. Mládek: Mezinárodní finanční instituce Bretton-woodské : výklad a stanovy Mezinárodního měnového fondu a Mezinárodní banky pro obnovu a rozvoj / Bretton Woods International Financial Institutions: Interpretation and Statutes of the International Monetary Fund and the International Bank for Reconstruction and Development, Published by the Ministry of Finance, Prague 1946
- Jan V. Mládek, Světová organisace hospodářství / World Economic Organization, Published by the Czech Economic Society, 1946
- Ladislav Karel Feierabend, Soumrak československé demokracie / The Twilight of Czechoslovak Democracy, Afterword by J. V. Mládek, Rozmluvy Vol. 2, Purley 1988
