= Sergěj Ingr =

Czech army general (1894–1956)

General of the Army Sergěj Ingr
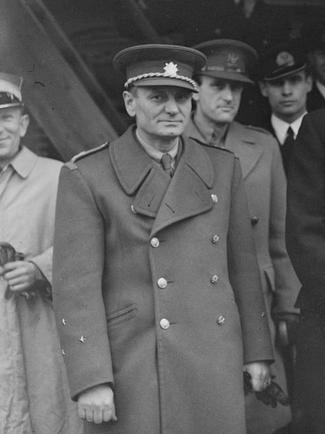
- Ingr in 1940

Minister of National Defense of Czechoslovakia
- In office 21 July 1940 – 19 September 1944
- Preceded by: Jan Syrový
- Succeeded by: Jan Masaryk

Personal details
- Born: 2 September 1894 Vlkoš, Moravia, Austria-Hungary
- Died: 17 June 1956 (aged 61) Paris, France

Military service
- Allegiance: Austria-Hungary; Serbia; Czechoslovakia
- Branch/service: Austro-Hungarian Army; Serbian Army; Czechoslovak Legions; Czechoslovak Army
- Years of service: 1913–1915 (Austria-Hungary); 1915–1916 (Serbia); 1916–1945 (Czechoslovakia)
- Rank: Sergeant (Austria-Hungary); General of the Army (Czechoslovakia)

Jan Sergěj Ingr (2 September 1894 – 17 June 1956) was a Czech military leader. He was a five star general of the Czechoslovak Army and the Minister of National Defense in the Czechoslovak government-in-exile during the Protectorate of Bohemia and Moravia.

== Early life ==
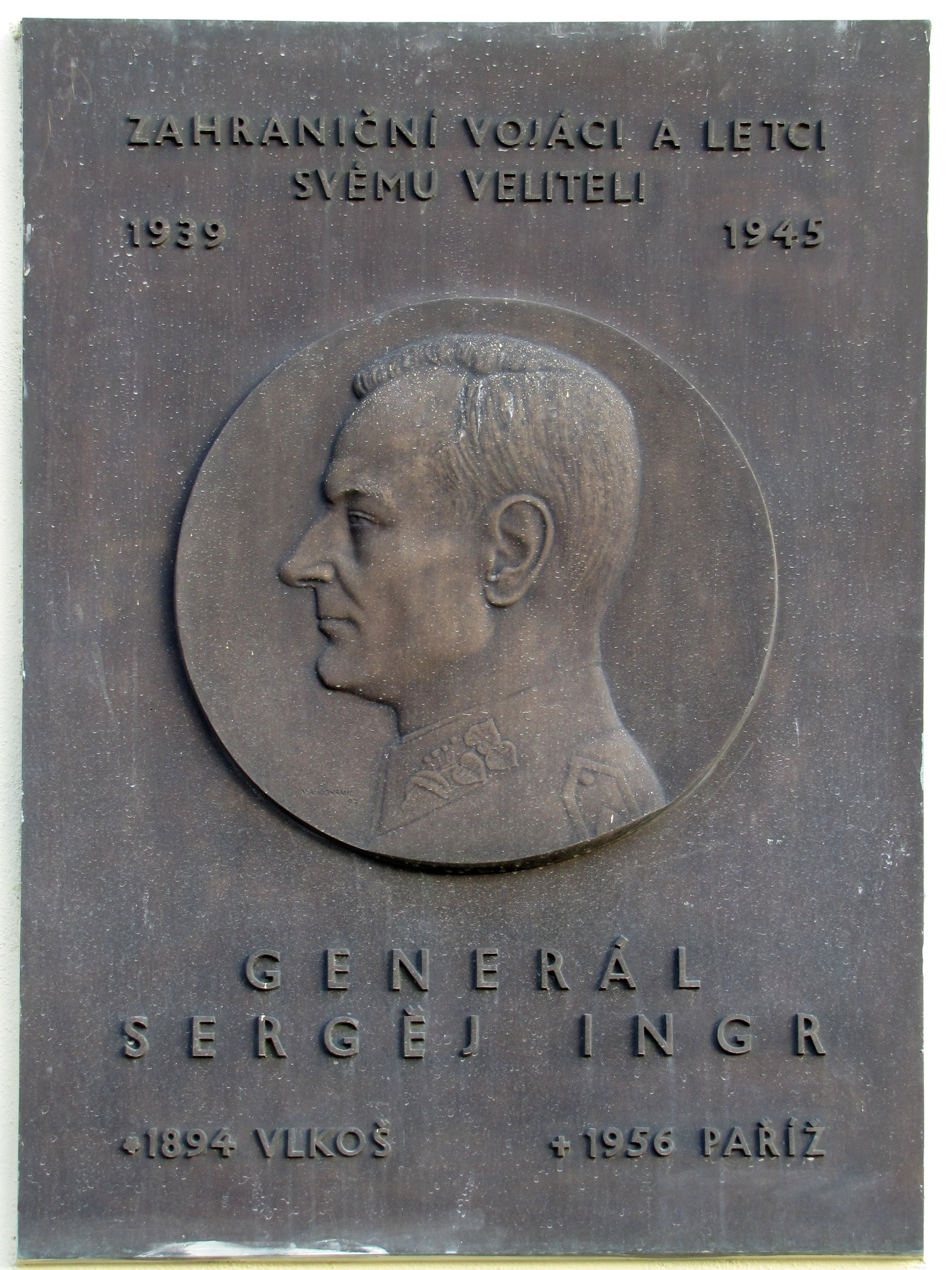
Commemorative plaque in Vlkoš

Ingr was born in Vlkoš in Moravia, Austria-Hungary (present-day Czech Republic) on 2 September 1894 to his father Jan, mayor of the municipality. He had four brothers and three sisters. He attended the gymnasium (secondary school) in Kyjov and in 1913 became a member of the cadet school in Královo Pole.

== First World War ==
After the outbreak of the First World War he went as a Sergeant to the Eastern Front. In the fall of 1915 he was captured by the Russians at Caricyn. He then joined the 1st Serbian Voluntary Division and fought against the Bulgarians in Dobruja. In 1916 he transferred to the 2nd Artillery Regiment of George of Poděbrady with the rank of Lieutenant and joined the famous Czechoslovak Legions. He adopted the name Sergěj and became a member of the Eastern Orthodox Church. In 1917 he fought in France and in 1918 took part in battles in the Ardennes and in Foligno. By the end of the war he had risen to Captain and was able to speak five foreign languages (German, Russian, Serbian, French and Italian).

== Between wars ==
In December 1918 he returned to Czechoslovakia to battle the Hungarians, who were claiming a part of Czechoslovak territory, as a part of the Hungarian–Romanian War of 1919. Following those engagements, he moved to Cieszyn Silesia and helped the army in the Polish–Czechoslovak War (1919). He then saw further victories in Jablunkov, as well as in Třinec and was promoted to Major. During the mobilization in 1938 he was already a divisional general and commander of the 3rd Czechoslovak Army Corps.

== Second World War ==
At the behest of president Edvard Beneš, Ingr moved into exile in France. In Paris, he established an Army Office and began mobilising Czechoslovak troops in the town of Agde, becoming Commander of the Czechoslovak Army in France. In 1940 he and his 11,405 volunteers took part in the Battle of France which saw combat on the Marne, the Seine and the Loire. After the establishment of the Czechoslovak government-in-exile in London, Ingr was appointed Minister of National Defense. In 1944, after intervention by the Communists, he was removed from office, but was instead appointed Commander-in-Chief of the Czechoslovak Armed Forces.

== Post-war ==
On 6 July 1945 Ingr was promoted to army general and retired, becoming his country's ambassador in The Hague. In 1949 he established The Council of Free Czechoslovakia as the attempt to reestablish the democracy in Czechoslovakia after the Communist's victory. He died in 1956, officially of heart failure.

== Decorations ==
Awarded by Czechoslovakia

- Czechoslovak War Cross, three tilia sprouts (1919)
- Czechoslovak War Cross (1940, 1945)
- Milan Rastislav Stefanik Order (1991)
- Czechoslovak Revolution Medal (1919)
- Allied Victory Medal (1919)
- Medal of Distinguished Service, 1st class (1944)
- Medal of Valor (1945)
- Memorial Medal of Czechoslovak Foreign Army (1944)
- Commemorative medal of the Battle of Zborov (1947)
- Commemorative medal of the second national resistance (1947)
- The Commemorative Medal of the 2nd Shooting Regiment "Jiri z Podebrad" (1947)

Awarded by Czech Republic

- Order of the White Lion military group I. Class (2024)

Awarded by France

- Légion d'honneur, Grand Officier (1950)
- Légion d'honneur, Commandeur (1947)
- Légion d'honneur, Officier (1940)
- Légion d'honneur, Chevalier [Knight] (1926)
- Médaille des services militaires volontaires (1928)

Awarded by Great Britain

- Order of the Bath, Knight Commander (1944)
- 1939–45 Star (1945)
- Defence Medal (1945)
- War Medal 1939–1945 (1945)

Awarded by Greece

- Order of the Redeemer, Grand Commander (1932)

Awarded by Italy

- Allied Victory Medal, (1928)
- Commemorative Medal of the Unity of Italy, (1930)

Awarded by the Netherlands

- Order of Orange-Nassau, Commander (1949)

Awarded by Norway

- Order of St. Olav, Commander (1949)

Awarded by Poland

- Order of Polonia Restituta, Grand Cross (1941)

Awarded by Romania

- Order of the Star of Romania, Commander (1930)

Awarded by Russia

- Order of Saint Stanislaus, 3rd class (1917)

Awarded by USA

- Legion of Merit, Commander (1945)

Awarded by Yugoslavia

- Order of White Eagle, Officer's Cross (1936)
- Order of White Eagle, Knight's Cross (1930)
- Order of the Yugoslav Crown, Second Class (1941)
- Order of St. Sava, Commander
- Albanian Commemorative Medal (1923)
