= Vlkoš =

Vlkoš may refer to places in the Czech Republic:

- Vlkoš (Hodonín District), a municipality and village in the South Moravian Region
- Vlkoš (Přerov District), a municipality and village in the Olomouc Region
