= Mastny =

Mastny (Czech: Mastný, feminine Mastná) is a Czech surname. Notable people with this surname include:

- Tom Mastny (born 1981), American baseball player
- Vojtěch Mastný (1874–1954), Czechoslovak diplomat
- Vojtech Mastny (historian) (born 1936), Czech-American historian
