= Cabinet of the Czechoslovak government-in-exile =

- Cabinet of the Czechoslovak government-in-exile
- Date formed: 21 July 1940
- Date dissolved: 5 April 1945

People and organisations
- Head of state: President Edvard Beneš
- Head of government: Jan Šrámek

Jan Šrámek formed the Czechoslovak government-in-exile after being recognised on the 21 July 1940 by Winston Churchill.

== First Cabinet ==
21 July 1940 – 12 November 1942

Office	Name	Dates
Prime Minister	Jan Šrámek	21 July 1940 – 12 November 1942
Minister of Defence	Sergej Ingr	21 July 1940 – 12 November 1942
Minister for Economic Recovery	Jaromír Nečas	27 October 1941 – 12 November 1942
Minister of Finance	Eduard Outrata	21 July 1940 – 27 October 1941
Minister of Finance	Ladislav Karel Feierabend	27 October 1941 – 12 November 1942
Minister of Foreign Affairs	Jan Masaryk	21 July 1940 – 12 November 1942
Minister of the Interior	Juraj Slávik	21 July 1940 – 12 November 1942
Minister of Social Welfare	František Němec	21 July 1940 – 12 November 1942
Minister without Portfolio (In charge of the Supreme Court of Audit Office)	Ján Bečko	21 July 1940 – 12 November 1942
Minister without Portfolio (Minister of Commerce, Industry and Trade)	Eduard Outrata	27 October 1941 – 12 November 1942
Minister without Portfolio	Ladislav Karel Feierabend	21 July 1940 – 27 October 1941
Minister without Portfolio	Jaromír Nečas	21 July 1940 – 27 October 1941
Minister without Portfolio	Štefan Osuský	21 July 1940 – 31 March 1942
Minister without Portfolio	Hubert Ripka	27 October 1941 – 12 November 1942
Minister without Portfolio	Rudolf Viest	27 October 1941 – 12 November 1942
Minister without Portfolio	Ján Lichner	27 October 1941 – 12 November 1942
Minister without Portfolio (Minister of Justice)	Jaroslav Stránský	27 October 1941 – 12 November 1942

== Second Cabinet ==
12 November 1942 – 5 April 1945

Office	Name	Dates
Prime Minister	Jan Šrámek	12 November 1942 – 5 April 1945
Minister of Foreign Affairs	Jan Masaryk	12 November 1942 – 5 April 1945
Minister of the Interior	Juraj Slávik	12 November 1942 – 5 April 1945
Acting Minister of Education	Juraj Slávik	12 November 1942 – 5 April 1945
Minister of Justice	Jaroslav Stránský	12 November 1942 – 5 April 1945
Minister of Finance	Ladislav Karel Feierabend	12 November 1942 – 5 April 1945
Minister of Defence	Sergej Ingr	12 November 1942 – 19 September 1944
Minister of Defence	Rudolf Viest	19 September 1944 – 4 February 1945
Minister of Social Welfare	Ján Bečko	12 November 1942 – 5 April 1945
Minister of Health and Physical Education	Ján Bečko	12 November 1942 – 5 April 1945
Minister of Agriculture and Public Works	Ján Lichner	12 November 1942 – 5 April 1945
Minister of Economic Recovery	František Němec	12 November 1942 – 5 April 1945
