= Meda Mládková =

Czech art collector (1919–2022)

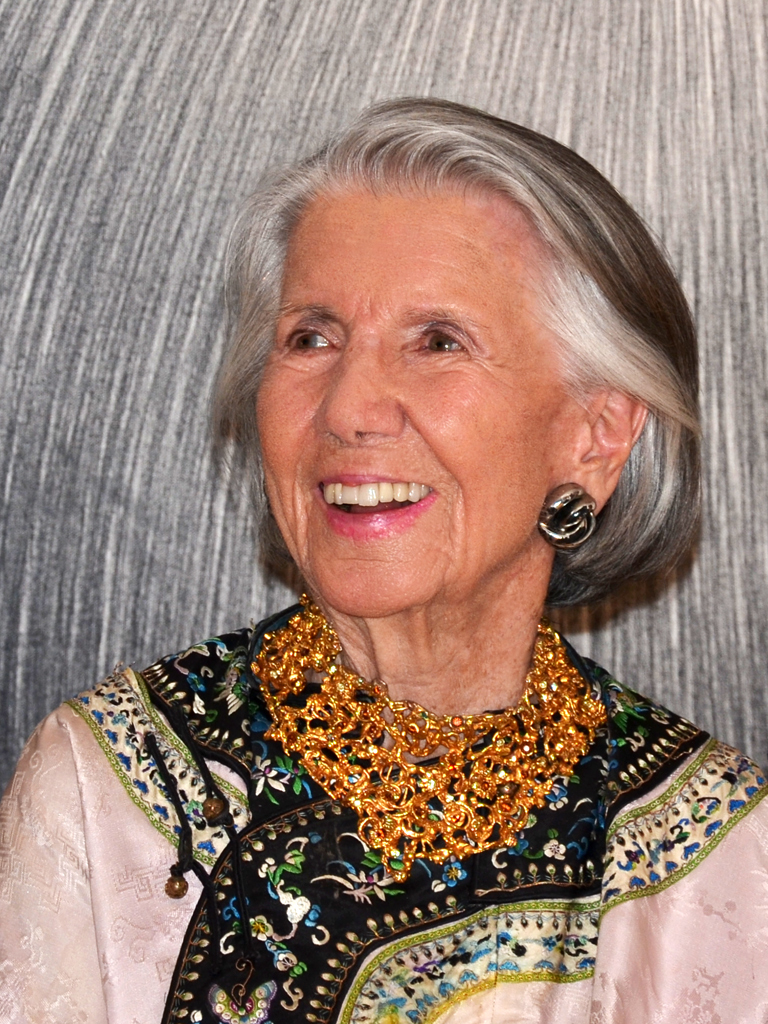
- Mládková in 2014
- Born: Marie Magdalena Františka Sokolová; 8 September 1919; Zákupy, Czechoslovakia
- Died: 3 May 2022 (aged 102); Prague, Czech Republic
- Occupations: Art collector and historian
- Spouse: Jan Viktor Mládek
- Awards: Medal of Merit; Artis Bohemiae Amicis Medal; Commander of the Order of the White Double Cross

Marie Magdalena Františka "Meda" Mládková (née Sokolová, 8 September 1919 – 3 May 2022) was a Czech art collector. Her husband, Jan Viktor Mládek (1911–1989), was an economist and a governor of the IMF. Having spent several years in exile, she returned to Czechoslovakia after the Velvet Revolution of 1989.

== Early life ==
Marie Magdalena Františka Sokolová was born on 8 September 1919 within the premises of the Zákupy castle, where her father was working as a brewer. Her family later decided to move to Brandýs nad Labem. She moved to Switzerland in 1946 to study Economics in Geneva, where she earned her Ph.D. Together with other exiles from Czechoslovakia, she published a magazine called Současnost (transl. Present Time). By February 1948, she decided not to return to Czechoslovakia. She consequently went to Paris, where she studied Art History at the Sorbonne and at L'Ecole du Louvre between 1955 and 1960.

== Exile ==
During her time in Paris, Mládková founded the first Czechoslovak exile publishing company called Edition Sokolova. One of its first published titles was a volume of verse by Ivan Blatný, and the writings of Ferdinand Peroutka. She also became acquainted with Jan Viktor Mládek, an economist and fellow emigrant. He oversaw the interim administration of Czechoslovakia's central bank in the aftermath of World War II, and in 1945 became one of the first Governors of the International Monetary Fund.

They eventually married and decided to settle permanently in Washington, D.C. in 1960. During their time in Washington, the couple built an important art collection. This included over 200 paintings by František Kupka, as well as 240 productions by Jiří Kolář and 17 sculptures by Otto Gutfreund. The couple even sold their home for $950,000 in order to purchase two of Kupka's oil paintings, one of which was Localization of Graphic Motifs II. She later donated this work to the National Gallery of Art in 1984. Mládková also arranged a Kupka retrospective at the Solomon R. Guggenheim Museum in 1975.

== Return to the Czech Republic ==
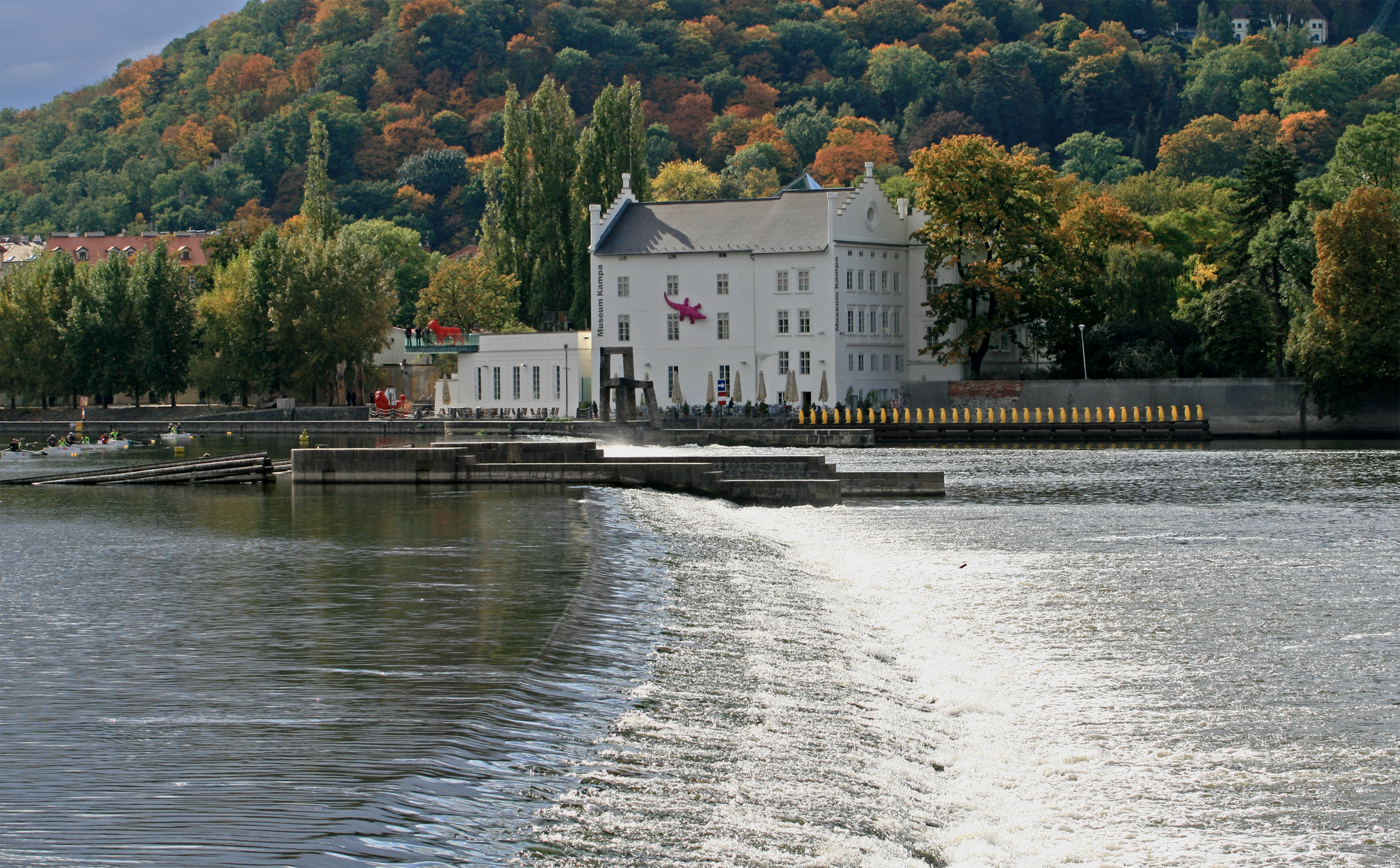
Sova's Mills in Prague

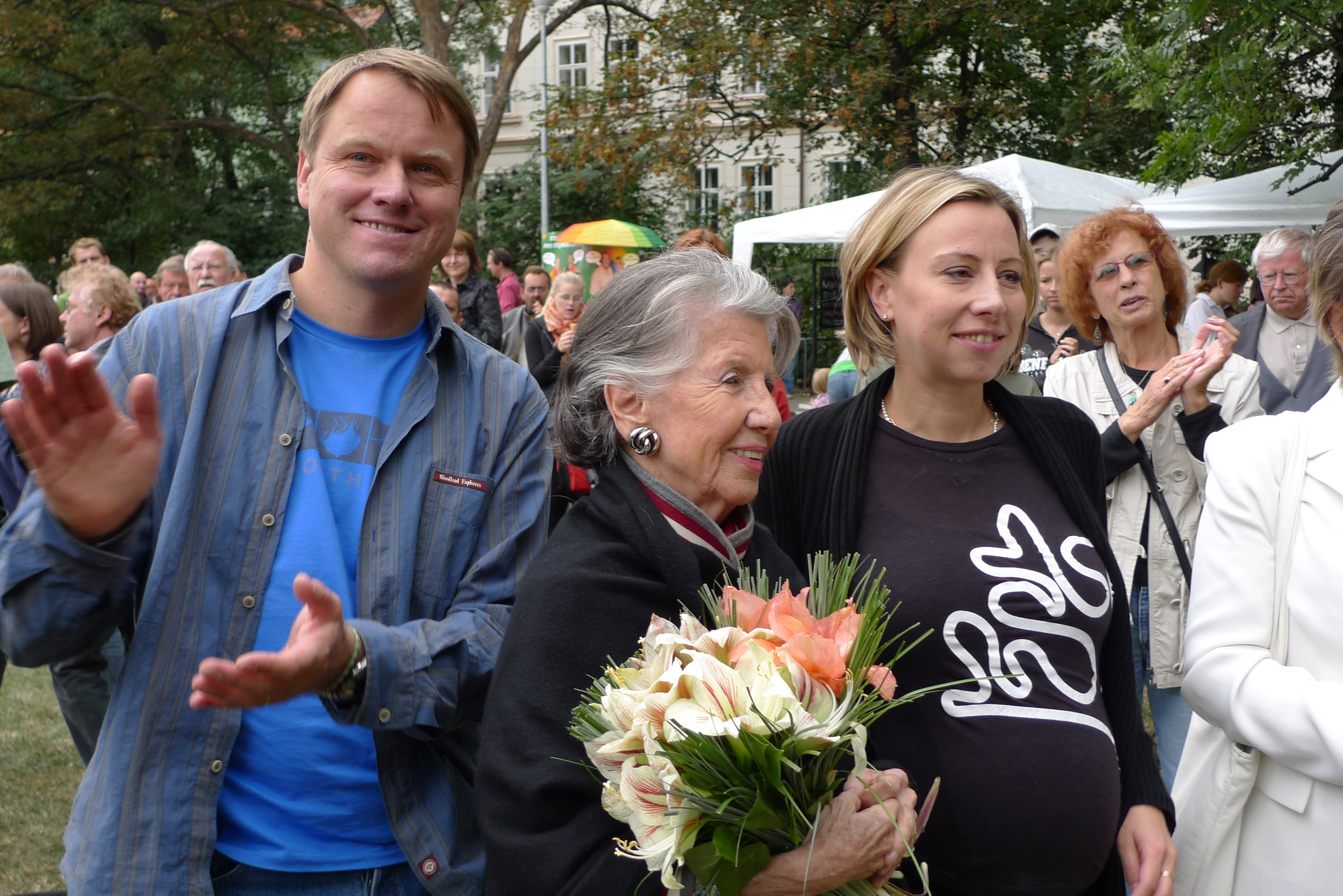
Meda Mládková (middle), Martin Bursík and Kateřina Jacques at Kampa (2009)

After the death of her husband in 1989, Mládková returned to the Czech Republic. She gave her art collection to the city of Prague, and joined the Civic Forum. Later, she founded the Jan and Meda Mládek Foundation and decided to reconstruct the historical premises of Sova's Mills and use it as a location for the Museum Kampa. Museum Kampa became home to her and her husband's art collection, which she donated to the City of Prague. The Jan and Meda Mládek Foundation has in its care a collection of Central European Modern art, and artworks by František Kupka and Otto Gutfreund. The price of the collection is today virtually inestimable. It consists of 215 studies, drawings and paintings, and ranks alongside the world's most comprehensive collections of its kind.

Mládková was bestowed a state decoration by Václav Havel in 1999. Thirteen years later, she was appointed a commander of the Ordre national du Mérite, in recognition of her efforts as an art collector and philanthropist. She died on 3 May 2022, at the age of 102.
