= Jan Masaryk =

Czechoslovak diplomat and politician (1886–1948)

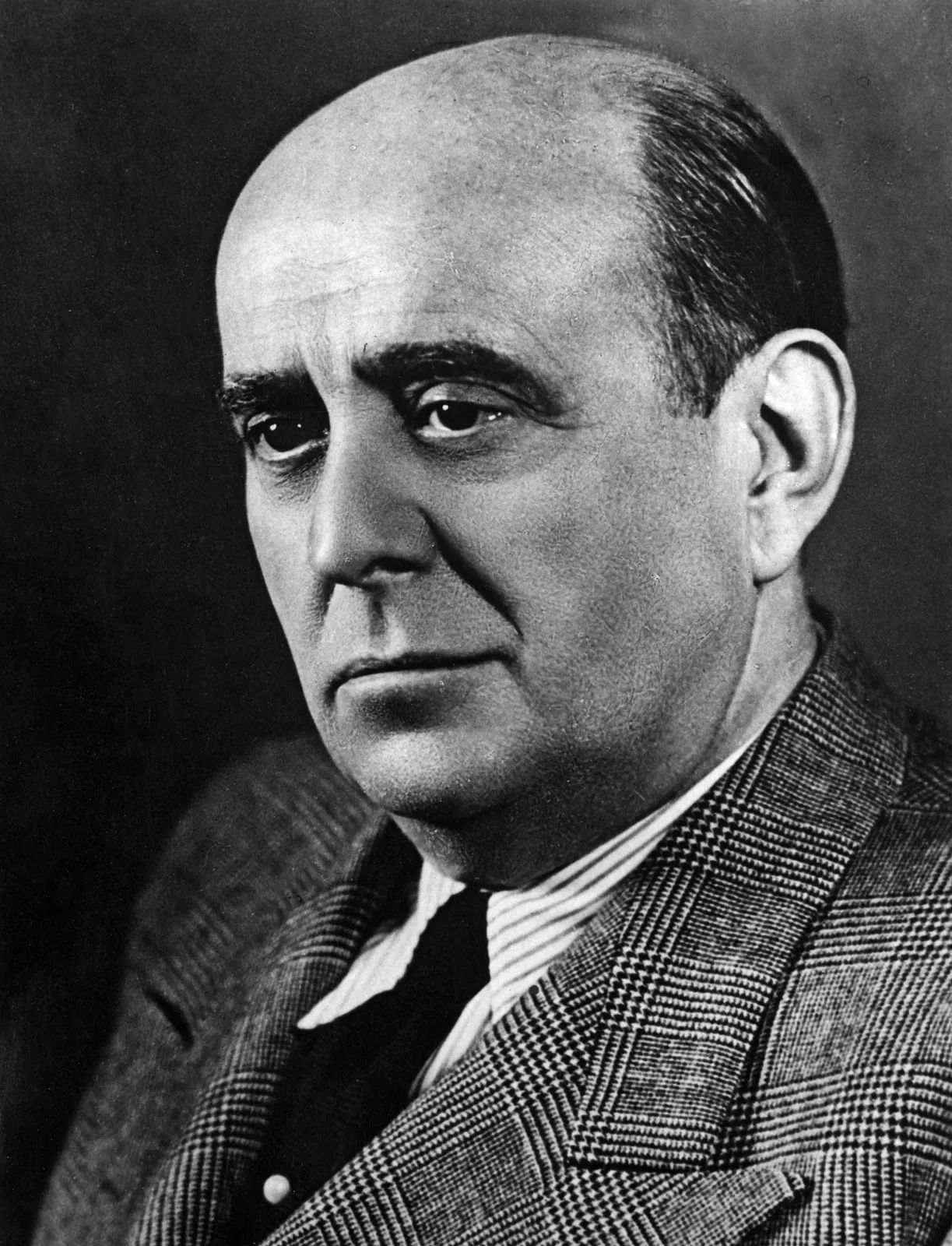

Foreign Minister of Czechoslovakia
- In office 21 July 1940 – 10 March 1948
- President: Edvard Beneš
- Prime Minister: Jan Šrámek; Zdeněk Fierlinger; Klement Gottwald
- Preceded by: German occupation
- Succeeded by: Vladimír Clementis

Czechoslovakia Ambassador to the United Kingdom
- In office 1925 – December 1938
- President: Tomáš Garrigue Masaryk; Edvard Beneš
- Preceded by: Vojtěch Mastný
- Succeeded by: Max Lobkowicz

President of the World Federation of United Nations Associations
- In office 2 August 1946 – 10 March 1948
- Preceded by: Post created
- Succeeded by: Nasrollah Entezam

Personal details
- Born: Jan Garrigue Masaryk; 14 September 1886 Prague, Austria-Hungary
- Died: 10 March 1948 (aged 61) Prague, Czechoslovakia
- Cause of death: Disputed – see text
- Parent: Tomáš Garrigue Masaryk
- Religion: Evangelical Church of Czech Brethren
- ^{1}In exile 1940 – April 1945

Jan Garrigue Masaryk (14 September 1886 – 10 March 1948) was a Czech diplomat and politician who served as the Foreign Minister of Czechoslovakia from 1940 to 1948. American journalist John Gunther described Masaryk as "a brave, honest, turbulent, and impulsive man".

Born in Prague in 1886 as the son of the future leader of Czechoslovakia Tomáš Garrigue Masaryk, Masaryk fought for Austro-Hungary in World War I. He then entered positions with the government of the new nation of Czechoslovakia, serving as minister-plenipotentiary to the United Kingdom for thirteen years from 1925. There, he dealt with criticism of Czechoslovakia's very existence from press baron Lord Rothermere in 1927, before then encountering the rising threat of Nazism to his nation. He was relieved at the abdication of Edward VIII (whom he saw as too sympathetic to Nazi rule) but resigned after the Munich Agreement and appeasement policies adopted by Neville Chamberlain's government, which he detested partly due to the limited involvement the Czechoslovak government had in the proceedings.

In World War II, Masaryk broadcast to the Protectorate of Bohemia-Moravia throughout the conflict via BBC radio. He also served as Foreign Minister in the Czechoslovak government-in-exile. He travelled with Edvard Beneš (the President of Czechoslovakia) to Moscow to meet Joseph Stalin, where it was agreed that Czechoslovakia would retain its autonomy whilst having a Soviet-aligned foreign policy.

Masaryk continued to serve as foreign minister in the coalition post-war government, but was often unable to act due to Soviet demands, particularly regarding their actions in stopping them from accepting Marshall Aid. He also sold arms to Israel during the 1948 Arab–Israeli War, which was important in enabling the state's establishment. After the 1948 Czechoslovak coup d'état, Masaryk briefly remained in his position despite being a non-communist, but was found dead on 10 March in disputed circumstances, having either committed suicide or been defenestrated.

== Early life ==
Born in Prague, he was the son of professor and politician Tomáš Garrigue Masaryk (who became the first president of Czechoslovakia in 1918) and Charlotte Garrigue, Tomáš Garrigue Masaryk's American wife. Masaryk was educated in Prague and also in the United States, where he lived for a time as a drifter before finding employment as a steelworker. Because of his youth in the United States, Masaryk always spoke both Czech and English with a strong American accent. He returned home in 1913 and served in the Austro-Hungarian Army during the First World War. Masaryk served in Galicia and learned Polish during his wartime career. The fact that his father was in exile, working for Czech independence from the Austrian empire, made him the subject of bullying and hazing during his military service as the son of a "traitor". His unhappy military service made him unwilling to speak very much of his time as a soldier after the war as it held too many painful memories.

He then joined the diplomatic service and became chargé d'affaires to the US in 1919 and then as counselor to the legation in London. In 1922, he became secretary to the Czechoslovak foreign minister Edvard Beneš. In 1925, he was made minister-plenipotentiary to Britain. The British scholar Robert Powell described Masaryk as "the most unconventional of diplomats. None was less tied to protocol. Witty, shrewd, with an abundance of common sense, he often triumphed over circumstances, which baffled others more intellectually cleverer, but lacking his psychological insight... He could be disconcertingly direct in his conversation and he considerably embarrassed certain types of English people. His manner was American rather than English, his racy language often shocking to people who had not the wit or patience to look beyond the actual expressions used." By contrast, the Czech historian Zbyněk Zeman and the German historian Rainer Karlsch described Masaryk as a weak man who drifted during his time in the United States, was psychologically unstable, and needed someone to guide him through life. His father resigned as president in 1935 and died two years later. He was succeeded by Edvard Beneš. Masaryk had been dominated by his father, and afterward by Beneš, who played the role of a surrogate father.

== Minister-plenipotentiary in London ==
Right from his arrival in London, Masaryk in his reports to Prague warned that many officials in the United Kingdom's Foreign Office were in the grip of nostalgia for the Austrian empire, haunted by what he called the "ghost of the Habsburg empire". Masaryk expressed concern that many in the Foreign Office were openly hostile towards Czechoslovakia and considered the nation a mistake that should never have been allowed to happen.

On 21 June 1927, under the influence of his Hungarian mistress, Princess Stephanie von Hohenlohe, the British press baron Lord Rothermere published a leader (editorial) in The Daily Mail newspaper calling for Hungary to regain lands lost under the Treaty of Trianon. Rothermere deemed it unjust that Hungary—a nation dominated by what he admiringly called a "chivalrous and warlike aristocracy"—should have its borders truncated and that Magyars should be placed under the rule of the peoples of Romania, Czechoslovakia, and Yugoslavia, whom Rothermere described as "cruder and more barbaric races". Through primarily concerned about what he called "justice for Hungary", Rothermere also argued that the Sudetenland should go to Germany. Rothermere's leader caused much worry in Prague and Beneš rushed to London to inquire if Rothermere was acting on behalf of the British government.

To counter the pro-Hungarian articles in The Daily Mail, the hostility of the Foreign Office, and the indifference of the British people to Czechoslovakia, Masaryk had money given to British journalists who wrote pro-Czechoslovak articles to make these articles widely available in a bid to influence British public opinion. The two most important British intellectuals whom Masaryk supported were the journalist Wickham Steed and the historian Robert Seton-Watson, both of whom were staunch supporters of Czechoslovakia and longtime friends of his father, President Masaryk. Masaryk provided the funds to make the writings of Steed and Seton-Watson available to the widest possible audience. The faculty and students at the School of East European and Slavonic Studies at King's College London tended to be very sympathetic towards Czechoslovakia, which was seen as a model democracy, and Masaryk often provided the funds to publicise their work. In 1930, when Steed's journal The Review of Reviews went bankrupt, Masaryk granted him enough money to keep his journal afloat. As part of his cultural diplomacy, Masaryk sometimes worked with Yugoslav diplomats to provide the money for journalists willing to challenge the pro-Hungarian slant of The Daily Mail, which was just as alarming to Belgrade as it was to Prague.

When Joachim von Ribbentrop arrived in London in October 1936 as the new German ambassador to the Court of St. James, he sent out invitations to the other ambassadors to attend a ball to introduce himself as was the normal practice at the time. Instead of using French (the language of diplomacy) in his invitations, which was the standard protocol, Ribbentrop insisted on using German as way to show the superiority of Germany. Masaryk responded to this gross violation of diplomatic protocol by giving his reply to Ribbentrop's letter in Czech, instead of German as Ribbentrop had expected. The other ambassadors did likewise with the Japanese ambassador responding in Japanese and the Turkish ambassador responding in Turkish, which caused chaos at the German embassy as nobody was certain who was attending the ball, as the German embassy lacked people able to translate the various replies. During the Abdication crisis, Masaryk was hostile to the new king Edward VIII, whom he described as a Nazi sympathizer, writing in a dispatch to Prague that the king "felt closer to fascism and Nazism than democracy, which he found slow and boring." Masaryk was equally hostile towards the king's mistress, Mrs. Wallis Simpson, whom he reported has stated she felt at home in Vienna and Budapest while loathing Prague. When Edward abdicated to marry Mrs. Simpson, Masaryk was relieved, writing that Ribbentrop had "lost in Mrs. Simpson a dangerous ally".

Unlike Beneš, Masaryk understood that the pro-Hungarian slant of The Daily Mail was caused by the influence on Lord Rothermere of Princess von Hohenlohe, whom Masaryk also knew was the mistress of Fritz Wiedemann, the adjunct to Adolf Hitler. Masaryk described Rothermere as dominated by Hohenlohe, writing that he would do anything to please her. In a dispatch to Prague, Masaryk wrote: "Is there any decency left in the world? A great scandal will erupt one day when the role which Steffi von Hohenlohe, née Richter, played during the visit of Wiedemann is revealed. This world-famous secret agent, spy, and swindler, who is a full Jewess, constitutes today the centre of Hitler's propaganda in London. Wiedemann stayed at her place. She keeps Hitler's photograph on her desk, inscribed "To my dear Princess Hohenlohe-Adolf Hitler", and next to it a photograph of Horthy, dedicated to the 'great stateswoman'."

Starting in 1935, the Sudeten German leader Konrad Henlein had visited London four times between 1935-1938 to give speeches criticising Czechoslovakia. Masaryk realized belatedly that Czechoslovakia was losing the propaganda war as the British media became enamoured of Henlein. In late December 1936 Masaryk gave an address to a group of British MPs to make the case for Czechoslovakia. Much of the address concerned defending the decision by Beneš to sign an alliance with the Soviet Union in 1935, which was unpopular in Britain. Masaryk argued that the alliance was necessary as it brought the Soviet Union around to defending the international order created by the Treaty of Versailles instead of trying to undermine it as had previously been the case. Masaryk concluded: "If we treat Russia as a pariah, it cannot be excluded that Russia and Germany could again get together." After his speech, Masaryk had an informal question and answer session with the assembled MPs. The two MPs that Masaryk spoke to the most were Sir Austen Chamberlain and Winston Churchill. Churchill warned Masaryk that British public opinion was turning against Czechoslovakia because of the Sudetenland issue, which the German government "would be able to use against us".

In May 1937, the Foreign Secretary, Anthony Eden, introduced Masaryk to the newly crowned king, George VI. Eden told the king that "the political and economic situation in Czechoslovakia, Sir, is good and firm." At the same audience, Ribbentrop greeted the king by giving him the Nazi salute, to which the king responded to with a bemused smile. The interaction between Ribbentrop and George left Masaryk uncertain as to whether to regard this as either silly or sinister. Masaryk reported to Prague that it would be unwise to place too much trust in Britain, which regarded Czechoslovakia as a problem in Europe. By 1938, Masaryk was reporting: "The English dislike us intensely. We are a deadweight for them and they curse the day on which we were founded."

During the Sudetenland crisis in the summer and fall of 1938, Masaryk traveled between London and Prague to meet with Beneš. To resolve the Sudetenland crisis, British Prime Minister Neville Chamberlain visited Germany to meet Adolf Hitler in his vacation home near Berchtesgaden on 15 September 1938. At the Berchtesgaden summit, it was agreed that the Sudetenland would "go home to the Reich" as Hitler had been demanding ever since the Nazi Party Congress at Nuremberg (Reichsparteitag) on 12 September 1938. In an attempt to sway British public opinion against the policy of the Chamberlain government, Masaryk, together with the Soviet ambassador Ivan Maisky, was in contact with Clement Attlee, the leader of the Labour Party, which was the Official Opposition to the Conservative-dominated National Government. Maisky and Masaryk encouraged Attlee to challenge the government's policy in the House of Commons. Masaryk was also in contact with Charles Corbin, the French ambassador in London. As a further step, Beneš had a large sum of money transferred to the Czechoslovak legation for Masaryk to spend on winning over British public opinion. Masaryk donated much of the money to Churchill's group "The Focus". Unknown to Masaryk, the Forschungsamt ("Research Office") had broken the Czechoslovak diplomatic codes. Hermann Göring, who was a close friend of Sir Nevile Henderson, the British ambassador to Germany, informed him that Masaryk was donating money to Churchill, information which Henderson in turn passed on to Chamberlain. The British historian Victor Rothwell noted that the revelation that Masaryk was subsidising Chamberlain's domestic critics such as Churchill made an extremely bad impression on Chamberlain, and that much of the hostility that Chamberlain displayed towards Masaryk was due to this revelation. In a letter to his sister, Chamberlain wrote that Churchill "...is carrying on a regular campaign against me with the aid of Masaryk, the Czech minister. They, of course, are totally unaware of my knowledge of their proceedings".

Under very strong Anglo-French pressure, President Beneš agreed to the terms of the Berchtesgaden summit on 19 September 1938. However, at the Bad Godesberg summit on 24 September 1938, Hitler rejected the Anglo-French plan for ceding the Sudetenland to Germany, telling Chamberlain that the Sudetenland needed to be annexed to Germany before 1 October 1938 rather than after October 1 as the Anglo-French plan called for. The Bad Godesberg summit pushed Europe to the brink of war. On 25 September 1938, Masaryk arrived at 10 Downing Street to tell Chamberlain that through Beneš had accepted the results of the Berchtesgaden summit, he rejected the German timetable for handing over the Sudetenland put forward at the Bad Godesberg summit. Much to Masaryk's annoyance, both Chamberlain and the Foreign Secretary, Lord Halifax, seemed more angry at Beneš for not withdrawing Czechoslovak troops from the border forts in the Sudetenland rather than at Hitler, leading Masaryk in a dispatch to Beneš recounting the meeting to call both Chamberlain and Halifax "stupid". To resolve the crisis on 28 September 1938, it was announced that an emergency summit would be held in Munich the next day to be attended by Hitler, Chamberlain, Benito Mussolini, and Édouard Daladier. To Masaryk's fury, the Munich conference was a return to the congress diplomacy of the 19th century where the leaders of the great powers would meet to decide the fate of Europe with no involvement from the small powers. Halifax told Masaryk that Vojtěch Mastný, the Czechoslovak minister-plenipotentiary in Berlin, would be allowed to attend the Munich conference only as an "observer" for "information only" with no power to be actually involved in the conference.

The resulting Munich Agreement of 30 September 1938 put an end to the crisis. The Munich Agreement was actually a compromise as Hitler dropped the demand to have the Sudetenland before 1 October 1938, but it was agreed that the Sudetenland would go to Germany in stages over the course of October 1938. When the terms of the Munich Agreement were announced, Masaryk was at the Soviet embassy in London and clinging to the arm of the Soviet ambassador, Ivan Maisky, Masaryk broke down in tears while muttering "they sold us into slavery to the Germans". Without the natural defensive barrier posed by the mountains of the Sudetenland, Czechoslovakia was defenseless against Germany, and the new Czechoslovak president Emil Hácha therefore promptly performed a volte-face in foreign policy. A sign of the new foreign policy came with the order that the staff of the legation in London should remove all the portraits of President Beneš and President Masaryk from the walls. After the Munich conference, Masaryk met with Chamberlain and Halifax at 10 Downing Street where he stated: "If you have sacrificed my nation for the sake of peace, I will be the first to applaud you. But if not, gentlemen, then God help your souls." On 1 October 1938, Churchill telephoned Masaryk to tell him that Beneš should delay handing over the border forts in the Sudetenland for the next 48 hours, because he was convinced that "a great reaction against the betrayal committed on us" would occur within the 48 hours that would topple the Chamberlain government and presumably install Churchill as prime minister. Masaryk did not believe this and advised Beneš to disregard Churchill's advice, warning that Churchill was reckless and that - however much he hoped that Chamberlain's government might fall because of the Munich Agreement - he did not believe that this was very likely. Neither Churchill nor Masaryk knew that their phones had been tapped by MI5 and that the conversation recording Churchill's attempt to sabotage the Munich Agreement was passed on to Chamberlain, who was not impressed.

In October 1938, the Sudetenland was occupied by Germany and Masaryk resigned as ambassador in protest, although he remained in London. Other government members (including Beneš) also resigned. In his last dispatch to Prague on 5 December 1938, Masaryk reported that the British now regarded Czecho-Slovakia (as the country had been renamed) as a German satellite state. In the letter announcing his resignation as minister on 30 December 1938, Masaryk wrote of the "prophylactic measures towards establishing permanent peace in Europe" where "my country was subjected to surgical appeasement with unprecedented vigor and not the slightest trace of anesthetic." Masaryk then left Britain to visit the United States, where he gave speeches criticizing appeasement. In a speech in January 1939, he argued that the Munich Agreement would have been justified if it brought about "permanent peace" in Europe, but he argued that it was very unlikely to do so.

On 15 March 1939, Germany occupied the remaining parts of the Czech provinces of Bohemia and Moravia, and a puppet Slovak state was established in Slovakia. The next day, 16 March 1939, Masaryk went on a radio station in New York, where in a radio address to the American people given in English, he stated: "Can I hope that this last blow to my homeland should dispel all doubts as to the future policy of the masters of central Europe? The rape of Bohemia in all its vulgarity is more than I can describe. Forgive me-". At that point, Masaryk broke down in tears. Upon regaining his composure, Masaryk stated: "I do not envy those who are perpetuating this horrible drama, either by vandal force or by turning their faces to the wall. They have committed sins against God." In July 1939, Masaryk returned to London, where he rented a flat in Westminster.

== Wartime ==
During the war he regularly made broadcasts over the BBC to occupied Czechoslovakia starting in September 1939 and ending in April 1945. Masaryk's speeches on the BBC's Czech language station made him into a national hero. It was illegal to listen to the BBC in the Protectorate of Bohemia-Moravia, but that did not stop people from tuning in to the BBC every Wednesday night to hear him speak on a radio program entitled Volá Londýn (London Calling). On 8 September 1939, Masaryk gave his first radio broadcast on the Volá Londýn show, where he called for "a free Czechoslovakia in a free Europe". During the war, the Volá Londýn radio show was the most popular radio program in Czechoslovakia and Masaryk was the most popular speaker on the show.

In an article published in Central European Observer on 1 February 1940, Masaryk declared his war aims as: "My conviction is that our little country is not going to be saved by any of these grand 'isms'-neither Fascism nor Bolshevism, Pan-Germanism or Pan-Slavism...I am definitely a Slav, but I hope a European first. I am convinced that the fate of our people cannot be separated from that of other Central European and Danubian peoples, whether they are Slavs or not...Narrow nationalism should disappear...An equal partnership in the cause of a European Risorgimento, a breakaway from isms of every kind. A Free Germany in a Free Europe; and besides her the Czechoslovakia of St. Wenceslas, Hus, Comenius, Palacký, Smetana, Masaryk and Čapek...A Free Czechoslovakia in a Free Europe".

When a Czechoslovak government-in-exile was established in Britain in July 1940, Masaryk was appointed Foreign Minister. R. H. Bruce Lockhart, who served as the British ambassador to the government-in-exile stated that the appointment of Masaryk as foreign minister was a clear sign that Beneš intended to run foreign policy himself as he noted that Masaryk was unlikely to offer forceful opposition to any policy Beneš pursued. Masaryk had a flat at Westminster Gardens, Marsham Street in London but often stayed at the Czechoslovak Chancellery residence at Wingrave or with President Beneš at Aston Abbotts, both near Aylesbury in Buckinghamshire. Beneš had lived in France for much of his life, and was described as someone who "knew France" well, but in contrast, he found the British to be something of a "mystery". Masaryk who lived in London for so long often made suggestions to appeal to a British audience. Powell wrote: "An understanding of human psychology was not one of the President's outstanding achievements, nor was his knowledge of languages. Masaryk made up for these deficiencies".

Beneš's main interest as president of a government-in-exile was to have the British agree to abrogate the Munich Agreement and accept that after the war the Sudetenland was to become part of Czechoslovakia again. The British were initially opposed to this war aim. Their position until August 1942 was that the Munich Agreement was still in effect and that the Sudetenland was therefore legally part of Germany. This unwillingness to renounce the Munich Agreement was primarily due to the desire to keep British options open should Hitler be overthrown and a peace treaty signed with a new German government. In their talks with various emissaries from the German resistance such as Adam von Trott zu Solz and Ulrich von Hassell in 1939–1940, the British representatives (namely John Wheeler-Bennett in the case of Trott and James Lonsdale-Bryans in the case of Hassell) were told quite firmly that there was absolutely no possibility of a post-Hitler government returning the Sudetenland to Czechoslovakia because both Trott and Hassell were adamant that the Sudetenland was going to stay a part of the Reich forever. The picture that Trott and Hassell painted to their British interlocutors was one where the majority of the Wehrmacht generals were desperate to overthrow Hitler and were only being held back by the unwillingness of Britain to make "honorable peace" terms. The "honorable peace" that Trott and Hassell wanted was one where Germany would keep not only the Sudetenland, but also Austria, the Memelland, Danzig, Upper Silesia and the Polish Corridor as well the return of the former German colonies in Africa. From the viewpoint of decision-makers in the Chamberlain government (and also for a time the Churchill government), the offer of making an "honorable peace" in exchange for having the Wehrmacht generals stage a coup d'état that would overthrow Hitler and avoid another long, bloody "total war" against Germany was very tempting. For this reason, H.M. government often hinted in the early years of the war that it was prepared to offer the "honorable peace" that the Wehrmacht generals were said to crave, and tended to cold-shoulder the Czechoslovak government-in-exile with its insistent demands that the Sudetenland being returned to Czechoslovakia. Masaryk found both Lord Halifax and his successor as Foreign Secretary, Eden, very evasive when came to the question of the Sudetenland. The standard reply that both Halifax and Eden gave him from 1940 to 1942 was that the question of the Sudetenland could only be discussed at the peace conference expected after the war and could not be discussed at present while the war was still going on. Churchill did not initially seek the destruction of Germany as a great power as a war aim, but instead envisioned a peace where Hitler would be overthrown and the Reich would continue as one of Europe's great powers. In a memo to Chamberlain written on 8 October 1939 while he was serving as the First Lord of the Admiralty, Churchill advocated a negotiated peace with a post-Hitler government that would ensure "a free, peaceful, and a prosperous Europe in which Germany, as one of its greatest nations, should play a leading and a honored part". In the same memo, Churchill called for the restoration of Czechoslovak and Polish independence, but stated that the future frontiers of Poland and Czechoslovakia would be determined when Britain negotiated peace with a post-Hitler government, a statement that implied that the Reich might be allowed to keep some of Hitler's conquests. As Prime Minister, Churchill made statements in private throughout 1940-1941 similar to those he expressed in his memo of 8 October 1939, saying he expected the war to end with Britain gaining the upper hand to such an extent that the Wehrmacht generals would overthrow Hitler rather than risk the destruction of the Reich and the war would end with a negotiated peace similar to the way that the First World War had ended. It was only in January 1943 that Churchil adhered to the "unconditional surrender" formula promoted by the U.S. President Franklin D. Roosevelt which stated the Allies would not negotiate any sort of peace with Germany and would only accept unconditional surrender.

The fact that Britain had offered "provisional" recognition to the Czechoslovak government-in-exile while extending full recognition to the governments-in-exile of other states such as Poland and Belgium was a further source of tension. On 12 June 1941, Eden, who was again serving as Foreign Secretary, told Masaryk that Britain could not extend full recognition to Czechoslovakia because the Dominions were all opposed. Eden noted that the Dominion prime ministers all felt that the Treaty of Versailles was too harsh towards Germany and were opposed to having the Sudetenland being returned to Czechoslovakia after the war. The Dominions were playing an important role in sustaining the British war effort. Of the divisions in the British 8th Army in North Africa, three were Australian, two were South African and one was New Zealander. Lockhart wrote in his diary that "Jan is depressed" after his meeting with Eden. Lockhart tried to explain to Masaryk that the Dominions were dubious about the idea of restoring Czechoslovakia in general and favored some sort of Central European federation after the war, leading to Masaryk to snap in fury that he believed in Czechoslovakia and that anything less than its restoration would be a betrayal. Masaryk with much sarcasm told Lockhart that according to British policy all of the Czechoslovak pilots killed in the Battle of Britain should be regarded as "provisionally dead".

With the launch of Operation Barbarossa on 22 June 1941, Beneš had unlimited faith in the potential of the Soviet Union, believing that Germany would be defeated by the spring of 1942 at the latest. Masaryk told the other cabinet members: "he [Beneš] now only has Russia on his mind. We must hold him, so that he won’t fly off to the sky". In 1942, Masaryk received an LL.D. from Bates College. In a letter to Eden on 25 August 1941, Masaryk expressed much concern that the Atlantic Charter would mean that the Sudetenland would remain a part of Germany. Masaryk argued to Eden that Czechoslovakia and Germany's other neighbors needed a situation after the war that "would enable them to defend peace for themselves and for the world against any future attempts by aggression by Germany"; and that this in turn required a defendable frontier (i.e. returning the Sudetenland to Czechoslovakia). The Foreign Office regarded Masaryk as foreign minister as more reasonable than Beneš, who was viewed as obstinate on the Sudetenland issue. On 29 September 1941, Baron Konstantin von Neurath was replaced as the Reichsprotektor of Bohemia-Moravia by SS-Obergruppenführer Reinhard Heydrich. Masaryk in a broadcast on the Volá Londýn show urged his listeners not to provoke Heydrich and starkly stated "I find it hard to wish you goodnight tonight" as he predicated that Heydrich's appointment was a sign that German policy towards the Czechs was now moving in a much hasher direction. After Heydrich's appointment, Masaryks's speeches on the Volá Londýn show took a significantly more anti-German tone, and much like Beneš he ceased to draw a distinction between the "good" Sudeten Germans loyal to Czechoslovakia vs. the "bad" Sudeten Germans who were not. In a radio broadcast in September 1941, Masaryk stated aggression against the Czechs was a national characteristic of the Germans and argued the current German occupation was merely a continuation of past policies, linking the Protectorate of Bohemia-Moravia to the Austrian Empire, the Thirty Years' War, the Hussite Wars, and the medieval German colonisation of Bohemia. Masaryk ended his speech by saying "the entire German population has been overtaken by that animalistically egoistical Prusso-Nazi mentality". Much of the increased anti-German tone along with suggestions of collective guilt for the Sudeten Germans by the government-in-exile in London was driven by the resistance groups in the Protectorate of Bohemia-Moravia who disliked Beneš's early wartime speeches. In one such speech in November 1939 Beneš praised the "wise and progressive Germans amongst us" who "stood united with us against Nazism", a statement that suggested at least some of the Sudeten Germans who were also victims of Nazism. Beneš received messages from resistance groups that his speeches were out of touch with Czech opinion and that ordinary Czechs "will tear you to pieces" if he continued with his distinction between the "good" Sudeten Germans vs. the "bad" Sudeten Germans.

Masaryk's case for the return of the Sudetenland was helped in 1942 by the reprisals undertaken by the Nazi regime following the assassination in Prague of Reinhard Heydrich, the acting Reichsprotektor of Bohemia-Moravia, by Czechoslovak agents of the Special Operations Executive. British officials did not seem to be especially moved by the reprisals, but the atrocities had been give much publicity and it was argued that Britain now owned a "psychological debt" to Beneš, whose people had suffered greatly at the hands of the Nazi regime. As late as 29 July 1942, Churchill advocated in a memo to the Deputy Prime Minister Clement Attlee a policy of winning the war via strategic bombing as he argued if Bomber Command just dropped enough bombs on German cities, the Wehrmacht generals would have to overthrow Hitler and negotiate peace. Churchill based this hope upon the way that the First World War had ended with the German generals forcing Kaiser Wilhelm II to abdicate in November 1918 rather than risk the destruction of the Reich as a great power. Churchill argued to Attlee that he did not think the British Army nor the US Army could face the Wehrmacht on equal terms at present and that strategic bombing was Britain's best hope of victory. However, in the same memo, Churchill stated that he embarked in 1940 upon a policy of strategic bombing as a way to induce the overthrow of Hitler because it was the only way that he could envision winning the war at the time, but now the United Kingdom had the Soviet Union and the United States as allies, he felt that Britain could seek harsher peace terms than those he envisioned seeking in 1940. Churchill argued with the Soviets and the Americans as allies, it was inevitable that the Allies would win the war. He argued to Attlee that he still saw strategic bombing and a negotiated peace as the best way to end the war for economic reasons, namely that nearly three years of war had seriously damaged the British economy and an all-out struggle to destroy Germany as a great power would leave a victorious Britain so weakened that it would be a lesser power compared to the United States and the Soviet Union. Churchill added with an Allied victory inevitable, he wanted peace terms that would ensure the "future security" of all of Germany's neighbors. On 5 August 1942, Eden gave a statement to the House of Commons abrogating the Munich Agreement and declared that the British government now legally recognised the Sudetenland as part of Czechoslovakia. Both Beneš and Masaryk were present in the visitor's gallery of the House of Commons to cheer on Eden's statement, which Beneš saw as a personal triumph that would finally guarantee the return of the Sudetenland to Czechoslovakia after Germany's defeat. On 29 September 1942, General Charles de Gaulle, the leader of the Free French forces, gave Masaryk a letter stating that France had now considered the Munich Agreement "null and void" and as such gave his support for the return of the Sudetenland to Czechoslovakia.

Masaryk supported Beneš's plans to expel all of the Sudeten Germans after the return of the Sudetenland. In a speech in December 1942, he advocated a collective guilt thesis for the Germans, saying that "not only the Nazis but the whole German nation" would be punished for everything that had done to the Czechs since 1938. In a 1943 speech in London, he declared that the vast majority of the Sudeten Germans had welcomed Germany annexing the Sudetenland in 1938 and warned there would be a "reckoning" with them after "liberation". Masaryk stated that the Sudeten Germans had no right to live in the Sudetenland as their ancestors had all arrived as "settlers" in the Middle Ages on what was Czech land and stated it had been a mistake after the "first liberation" in 1918 not to seek "retribution" against them, saying after the "second liberation", there would be "retribution" against the Sudeten Germans. Masaryk ended his speech by saying the "minority problem will be settled radically and with finality" by expelling all of the Sudeten Germans into Germany and replacing them with Czechs. Like almost all Czechs, Masaryk had been greatly embittered by the way that the Sudeten Germans had behaved in 1938, and he shared Beneš's viewpoint that there was no place for the Sudeten Germans in a restored Czechoslovakia.

In June 1943, Masaryk spoke with Philip Nichols of the Foreign Office and expressed much doubt about a proposed treaty to create a military alliance between Czechoslovakia and the Soviet Union that was being energetically championed by Zdeněk Fierlinger, the Czechoslovak ambassador in Moscow. Masaryk did not oppose the proposed treaty outright but hinted to Nichols that his preference was for Czechoslovakia to move closer to Poland than to the Soviet Union after the war. In a 1943 speech on the Volá Londýn radio show to celebrate the Jewish new year, Masaryk urged people in the Protectorate of Bohemia-Moravia to assist the Jewish community, saying it was incumbent to extend a helping hand to the "most wretched of the wretched" as he called the Jews of the protectorate, and saying that he wanted ordinary Czechs to be able to say after the war that "we remained decent people". Masaryk was a supporter of Zionism and a friend of Dr. Chaim Weizmann.

Between 17 October 1943 and 10 February 1944, Masaryk went on a lengthy speaking tour of the United States, which removed him from the meetings of the Czechoslovak cabinet. In December 1943, Beneš went to Moscow to sign a treaty creating a 25-year military alliance between Czechoslovakia and the Soviet Union. Upon his return to London, Masaryk was forced to accept the fait accompli. In a radio speech on 16 February 1944, Masaryk stated that the Soviet-Czechoslovak alliance "was approved of in America", though "there were a few reactionaries who hide their own selfish interests behind the pretense of the fear of Bolshevism". Masaryk added that "we should get used to calling it the Soviet empire. Because it will be the Soviet empire which will play the most important role on the continent".

In an unauthorised act, Fierlinger in July 1944 sent out a public telegram to Edward Osóbka-Morawski, celebrating the entry of the Polish People's Army onto Polish soil. This led Beneš to rebuke Fierlinger for an act that implied support for the Soviet puppet Lublin government. Masaryk wanted to fire Fierlinger for that letter, complaining that he was no longer representing Czechoslovakia in Moscow in any meaningful sense of the term. On 28 July 1944, the entire Czechoslovak cabinet recommended to Beneš that he sack Fierlinger as ambassador in Moscow and appoint a new ambassador who would represent the interests of the government-in-exile instead of the Soviet Union, but Beneš refused to accept this recommendation.

In April 1945, Beneš and Masaryk travelled to Moscow to meet Stalin, where it was agreed that Czechoslovakia's foreign policy would be aligned with the Soviet Union, but that Czechoslovakia would retain its independence and democracy.

== After the war ==
Masaryk remained Foreign Minister following the liberation of Czechoslovakia as part of the multi-party, communist-dominated National Front government. The Communists under Klement Gottwald saw their position strengthened after the 1946 elections, but Masaryk stayed on as Foreign Minister. He was concerned with retaining the friendship of the Soviet Union, but was dismayed by the Soviet veto on Czechoslovak participation in the Marshall Plan.

Czechoslovakia sold arms to Israel during the 1948 Arab–Israeli War. The deliveries from Czechoslovakia proved important for the establishment of Israel. Masaryk personally signed the first contract on 14 January 1948. Masaryk was viewed as the most sympathetic to the Jews of members of the postwar government, so was given the task of "appeasing Jewish organisations in the west" in terms of the government's plans to expel the country's German population, including German-speaking Jews.

Flag of the World Federation of United Nations Associations of which Jan Masaryk was president from 1947 to 1948.

In February 1948, the majority of the non-communist cabinet members resigned, hoping to force new elections. Instead, a communist government under Gottwald was formed in what became known as the Czech coup ("Victorious February" in the Eastern Bloc). Masaryk met the visiting Soviet deputy foreign minister, Zorin, who told him that he hoped that he would become a member of the "new government". This confused Masaryk because the current government had not fallen. Zorin told him that "Gottwald is our only guarantee. The government must be cleaned up. We are determined to build a new one, which is more friendly to us and we shall support Gottwald". Masaryk remained Foreign Minister and was the only prominent minister in the new government who was neither a Communist nor a fellow traveller. On 27 February 1948, Bob Dixon, the British ambassador in Prague, reported to London: "Masaryk was pathetic and at one point broke down (or put on an act of breaking down). He was of course looking for sympathy and said that by staying in the Govt. he hoped he might be able to help a little; he had saved about 50 people from being purged by doing so; & finally Benes had asked him to stay. But I fear that the predominant consideration was his personal safety: he admitted that he would have been arrested at once if he had resigned and said that he did not hanker after a martyr's crown". Dixon grimly reported: "My guess is that he will not be with us long."

Masaryk served as the President of the World Federation of United Nations Associations. A memorial to his memory and his presidency of the Organisation is located in Geneva, Switzerland.

== Death ==
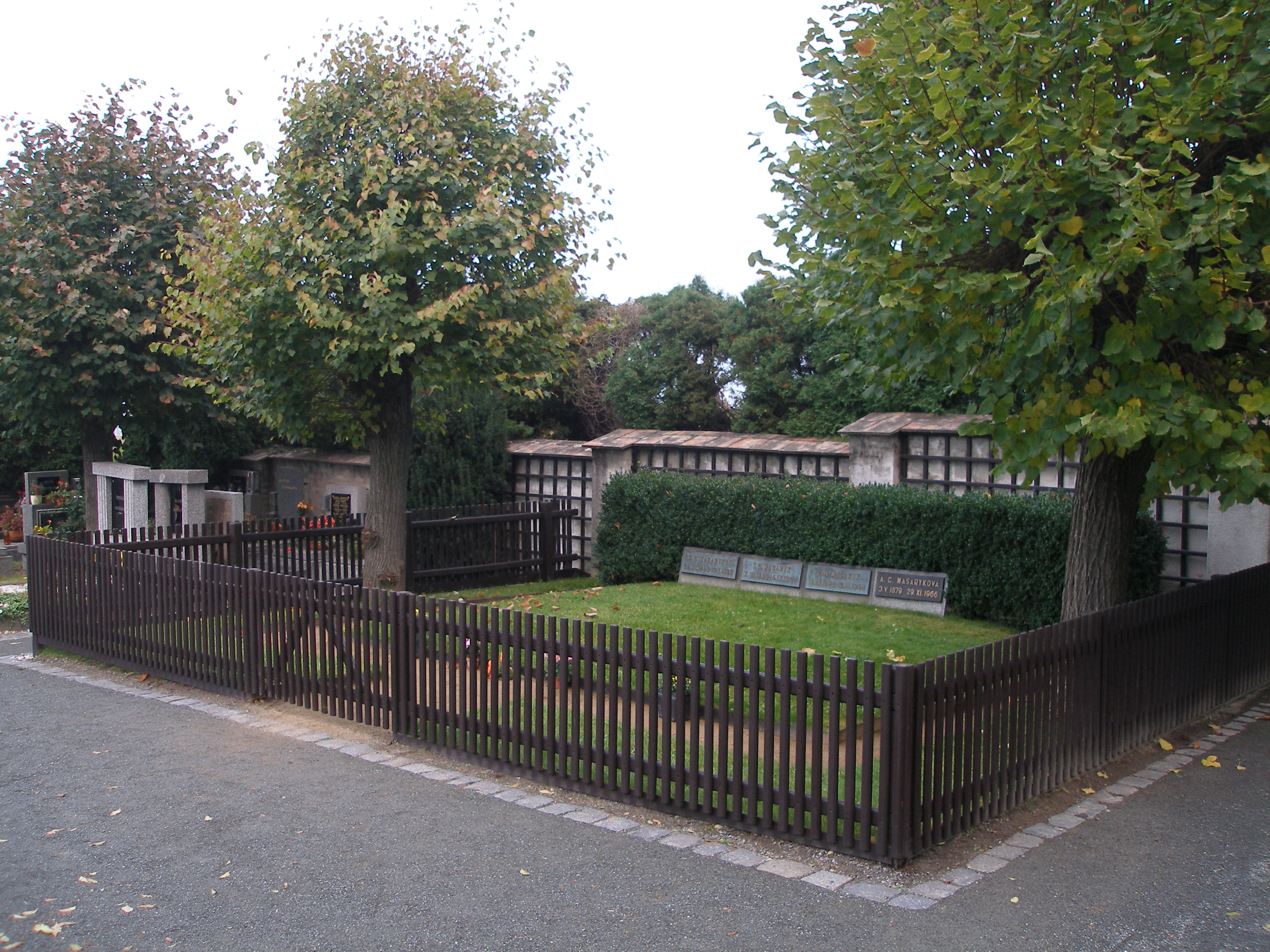
Grave of the Masaryk family in Lány cemetery

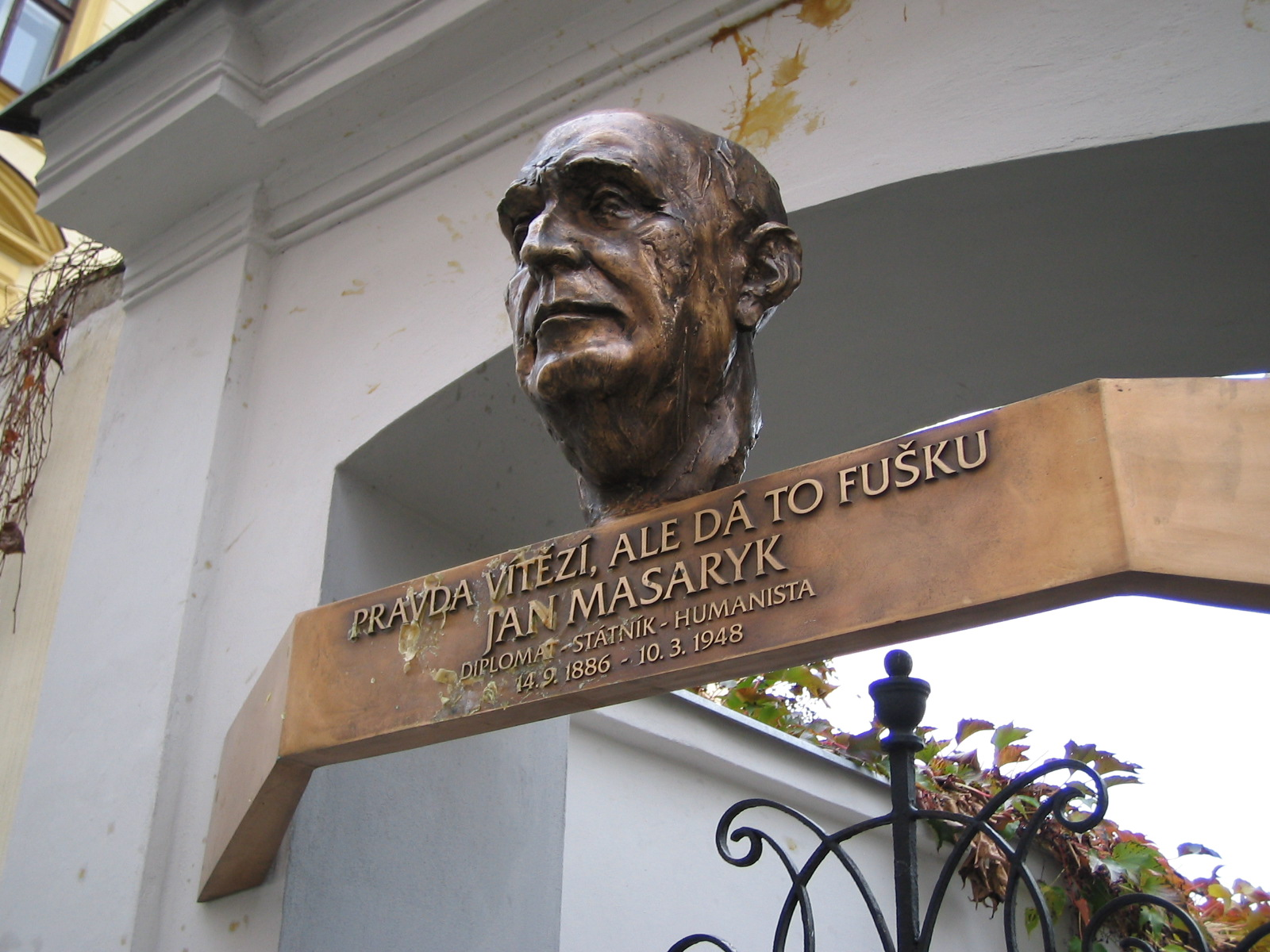
Memorial plaque with Masaryk's quote "Pravda vítězí, ale dá to fušku" (The truth prevails, but it's a chore). It is a reference to the Czechoslovak national motto Pravda vítězí (Truth prevails).

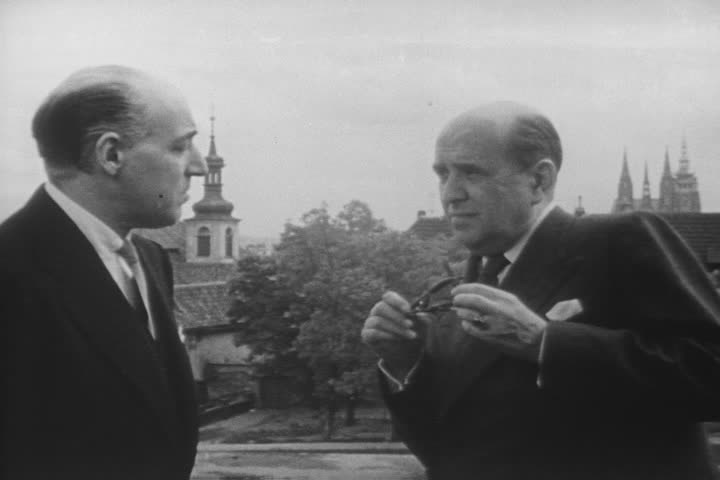
Jan Masaryk with Laurence Steinhardt, the United States Ambassador to Czechoslovakia.

On 10 March 1948, Masaryk was found dead, dressed only in his pajamas, in the courtyard of the Foreign Ministry (the Černín Palace in Prague) below his bathroom window. Jan Masaryk's remains were buried next to his parents in a plot at Lány cemetery, where in 1994 also the ashes of his sister Alice Masaryková were laid to rest.

The Ministry of the Interior claimed that he had committed suicide by jumping out of the window, but it was widely assumed at the time that he had been murdered at the behest of the nascent Communist government. On the other hand, many of his close associates (e.g. his secretary Antonín Sum, his press assistant Josef Josten, his sister Olga and Viktor Fischl) have always defended the suicide story. Masaryk's close friend at the time, future Ambassador Charles Yost was convinced that Communists flung him out of his apartment when they had no further use for him. After Masaryk's death, Dixon reported to R. H. Bruce Lockhart: "The last time I saw him - Saturday 28 February just after Benes's capitulation - he was absolutely wretched. I told him I sympathised with his position and he opened his heart to me, even to the extent of saying that he would find a way out soon. I think he was even then contemplating suicide, for there really was no other way out for him, a prisoner in the Czernin Palace. He was suffering the tortures of the damned because he knew that by joining the new government he had betrayed his trust, and though he kidded himself into believing that he could do some good and save some lives, he knew that he had sold his soul to the devil".

In a second investigation undertaken in 1968 during the Prague Spring, Masaryk's death was ruled an accident, not excluding a murder and a third investigation in the early 1990s after the Velvet Revolution concluded that it had been a murder. In his 1980 autobiography History and Memory, US Ambassador Charles W. Yost, a friend of Masaryk who worked with him in Prague in 1947, and also a friend of Masaryk's fiancée Marcia Davenport, wrote, "The Communists used him and, when his usefulness was past, flung him out of a window to his death."

Discussions about the mysterious circumstances of his death continued for some time. Those who believe that Masaryk was murdered called it the Third (or Fourth) Defenestration of Prague, and point to the presence of nail marks on the window sill from which Masaryk fell, as well as smearings of feces and Masaryk's stated intention to leave Prague the next day for London. Members of Masaryk's family—including his former wife, Frances Crane Leatherbee, a former in-law named Sylvia E. Crane, and his sister Alice Masaryková — stated their belief that he had indeed killed himself, according to a letter written by Sylvia E. Crane to The New York Times, and considered the possibility of murder a "cold war cliché". However, a Prague police report in 2004 concluded after forensic research that Masaryk had indeed been thrown out of the window to his death. This report was seemingly corroborated in 2006 when a Russian journalist claimed that his mother knew the Russian intelligence officer who threw Masaryk out of the window of the west bathroom of Masaryk's flat.

The highest-ranking Soviet Bloc intelligence defector, Lt. Gen. Ion Mihai Pacepa, claimed he had a conversation with Nicolae Ceauşescu, who told him about "ten international leaders the Kremlin killed or tried to kill". Jan Masaryk was one of them.

Czech historian Václava Jandečková has tentatively suggested in her 2015 monograph "Kauza Jan Masaryk: Nový pohled" (The Jan Masaryk Case: A New Perspective) that Masaryk might have been murdered by Jan Bydžovský and František Fryč, who believed they were working for the British intelligence service SIS but most probably fell victim to NKVD agents. Bydžovský confessed to murdering Masaryk when interrogated in prison by the Czech secret police StB in the 1950s (in an unrelated case); but later denied it. Jandečková argues that this confession cannot be so easily dismissed as has been believed, especially because Bydžovský was certainly not hallucinating or drugged, but also because the interrogators seem to have been surprised by his confession (at his trial, the Masaryk murder was not "used" or even mentioned, although a separate re-investigation by the StB continued for more than a year).

A new investigation that opened in 2019 included a new expert opinion regarding the mechanics of the fall, and an old tape by the policeman who was among the first at the crime scene, testifying that the body had already been moved by the time he arrived. The investigation closed in 2021, with murder, accident or suicide all considered possible.

According to Czech press, newly released archival documents from Britain, France, and the United States have prompted the Czech authorities to reopen the investigation into Masaryk's death. The recent discoveries of about 150 pages of diplomatic dispatches, reports and analyses suggest inconsistencies in the original narrative. Notably, one document indicates that, on the evening before his death, Masaryk's valet, Bohumil Příhoda, served coffee to three unidentified men - contradicting prior statements that no visitors were present. During this encounter, Masaryk was reportedly heard exclaiming, "I will do everything for you, but I will never sign this — only over my dead body." These revelations led the Czech Police's Office for Documentation and Investigation of Crimes of Communism to reopen the case in January 2025, aiming to reassess the circumstances surrounding Masaryk's death.

== Private life ==
From 1924 until their divorce in 1931, Masaryk was married to Frances Crane Leatherbee (1887–1954). An heiress to the Crane piping, valves and elevator fortune, and the former wife of Robert Leatherbee, she was a daughter of Charles R. Crane, a U.S. minister to China; and a sister of Richard Teller Crane II, a U.S. ambassador to Czechoslovakia. By that marriage, Masaryk had three stepchildren: Charles Leatherbee, Robert Leatherbee Jr., and Richard Crane Leatherbee. Stepson Charles Leatherbee (Harvard 1929) co-founded the University Players, a summer stock company in Falmouth, Massachusetts, in 1928 with Bretaigne Windust. He married Mary Lee Logan (1910–1972), younger sister of Joshua Logan, who became one of the co-directors of the University Players in 1931.

In 1945 the exile Masaryk became close to the American writer Marcia Davenport, whom he felt had a strong affinity to Czechs and to the city of Prague, depicted in several of her books. Davenport had in 1944 divorced her husband Russell Davenport and is known to have followed Masaryk to post-war Prague and lived with him there from 1945 to 1948. Following the Communist coup she returned to London, where she and Masaryk planned to be married as soon as he could join her, but only a few days later he was found dead.

Masaryk was a skilled amateur pianist. In that capacity, he accompanied Jarmila Novotná in a recital of Czech folk songs issued on 78 RPM records to commemorate the victims of the Nazi eradication of Lidice.

He is reputed to have had an exquisite sense of humour. It is reported that when he was a young Czechoslovak Ambassador to the US, he attended many parties and once the hostess invited him to play the violin. Accepting graciously, he played a Czech nursery song to enthusiastic applause from the audience. Leaving the party with a friend, he was asked why had he been asked to play the violin, to which he replied: "Oh, it's all very simple-- don't you see? They have mixed me up with my father; they mixed him up with Paderewski. And they mixed the piano up with the violin." Jan Masaryk was active in many societies, notably an active freemason.

== Awards and honors ==
- First Class of the Order of Tomáš Garrigue Masaryk (Czechoslovakia, 1991) (posthumous)
- King Christian X's Liberty Medal (Denmark)
- Grand Cross of the Order of Polonia Restituta (Poland, 1947)

=== Jan Masaryk Medal ===
The Jan Masaryk Silver Medal of Honor (Czech: Stříbrná medaile Jana Masaryka) is awarded by the Ministry of Foreign Affairs of the Czech Republic and is one of the highest awards that can be received by foreign nationals.

== See also ==
- A Prominent Patient, a 2017 film
- List of unsolved deaths

== Bibliography ==
- Bloch, Michael (1992). Ribbentrop. New York: Crown Publishing. ISBN 9780517593103.
- Bryant, Chad (2009). Prague in Black Nazi Rule and Czech Nationalism. Harvard University Press: Cambridge. ISBN 9780674261662.
- Callaghan, John (2007). The Labour Party and Foreign Policy A History. London: Taylor & Francis. ISBN 9781134540167.
- Carter, Katherine (2024). Churchill's Citadel Chartwell and the Gatherings Before the Storm. New Haven: Yale University Press. ISBN 9780300270198.
- Carsten, Francis (April 1983). "Jan Masaryk Twelve Days before His Death". The Slavonic and East European Review. 61 (2): 252–253.
- Cornwell, Mark (1993). "The rise and fall of a 'special relationship'?: Britain and Czechoslovakia, 1930-1948". In Brian Brivati, Brian and Harriet Jones (ed.). What Difference did the War Make?. Leicester: Leicester University Press. pp. 130–150. ISBN 071852263X.
- Crampton, Richard (1997). Eastern Europe in the Twentieth Century. London: Routledge. ISBN 0415164230.
- Davenport, Marcia (1967). Too Strong for Fantasy. New York: Charles Scribner's Sons.
- Harrison, Erica (2024). Radio and the Performance of Government Broadcasting by the Czechoslovaks in Exile in London, 1939-1945. Prague: Karolinum Press. ISBN 9788024655215.
- Lendvai, Paul (2004). The Hungarians A Thousand Years of Victory in Defeat. Princeton: Princeton University Press. ISBN 9780691200286.
- Lukes, Igor (1996). Czechoslovakia Between Stalin and Hitler The Diplomacy of Edvard Beneš in the 1930s. Oxford University Press. ISBN 978-019510266-6.
- Powell, Robert (April 1950). "Jan Masaryk". The Slavonic and East European Review. 28 (71): 332–341.
- Olmsted, Kathryn S. (2022). The Newspaper Axis Six Press Barons Who Enabled Hitler. New Haven: Yale University Press. ISBN 9780300265552.
- Orzoff, Andrea (2009). Battle for the Castle The Myth of Czechoslovakia in Europe, 1914-1948. Oxford: Oxford University Press. ISBN 9780199709953.
- Ragsdale, Hugh (2004). The Soviets, the Munich Crisis, and the Coming of World War II. Cambridge University Press. ISBN 978-113945025-6.
- Manchester, William (1989). The Last Lion: Winston Spencer Churchill: Alone, 1932-1940. New York: Random House. ISBN 9780385313315.
- Moses, Dirk (2020). "Cutting out the Ulcer and Washing Away the Incubus of the Past: Genocide Prevention via Population Transfer". In Moses, A. Dirk; Duranti, Marco; Burke, Roland (eds.). Decolonization, Self-Determination, and the Rise of Global Human Rights Politics. Cambridge: Cambridge University Press. pp. 153–177. ISBN 9781108479356.
- Reynolds, David (2004). In Command of History Churchill Fighting and Writing the Second World War. London: Penguin Group. ISBN 0-713-99819-9.
- Rothwell, Victor (2001). The Origins of the Second World War. Manchester: Manchester University Press. ISBN 0719059585.
- Rothkirchen, Livia (2006). The Jews of Bohemia and Moravia Facing the Holocaust. Lincoln: University of Nebraska Press. ISBN 9780803205024.
- Smetana, Vít (2008). In the Shadow of Munich British Policy Towards Czechoslovakia from the Endorsement to the Renunciation of the Munich Agreement (1938-1942). Prague: Charles University Press. ISBN 9788024613734.
- Sterling, Claire (1969). The Masaryk Case. New York: Harper & Row.
- Sviták, Ivan (1990). The Unbearable Burden of History The Sovietization of Czechoslovakia. San Francisco: Academia. ISBN 9788020003256.
- Taylor, Telford (1979). Munich The Price of Peace. New York: Vintage Books. ISBN 9780394744827.
- Wheeler-Bennett, John (1967). The Nemesis of Power The German Army in Politics 1918-1945. London: Macmillan.
- Zeman, Zbyněk A. B. (1976). The Masaryks The Making of Czechoslovakia. New York: Barnes & Noble Books. ISBN 9780064979689.
- Zeman, Zbyněk; Karlsch, Rainer (2008). Uranium Matters: Central European Uranium in International Politics, 1900-1960. Budapest: Central European University Press. ISBN 978-963977600-5.

Government offices
Preceded by German occupational ministry	Minister of Foreign Affairs of Czechoslovakia; 1945–1948	Succeeded by Vladimír Clementis
