= Jaroslav Stránský =

Czech ice hockey player

- Born: 6 June 1899; Nymburk, Austria-Hungary
- Died: March 1945 (aged 45)
- Position: Goaltender
- National team: Czechoslovakia
- Playing career: 1922–1933

Jaroslav Stránský (6 June 1899 – March 1945) was a Czech ice hockey player. He competed in the men's tournament at the 1924 Winter Olympics.
