= Vlkoš (Hodonín District) =

- Municipality
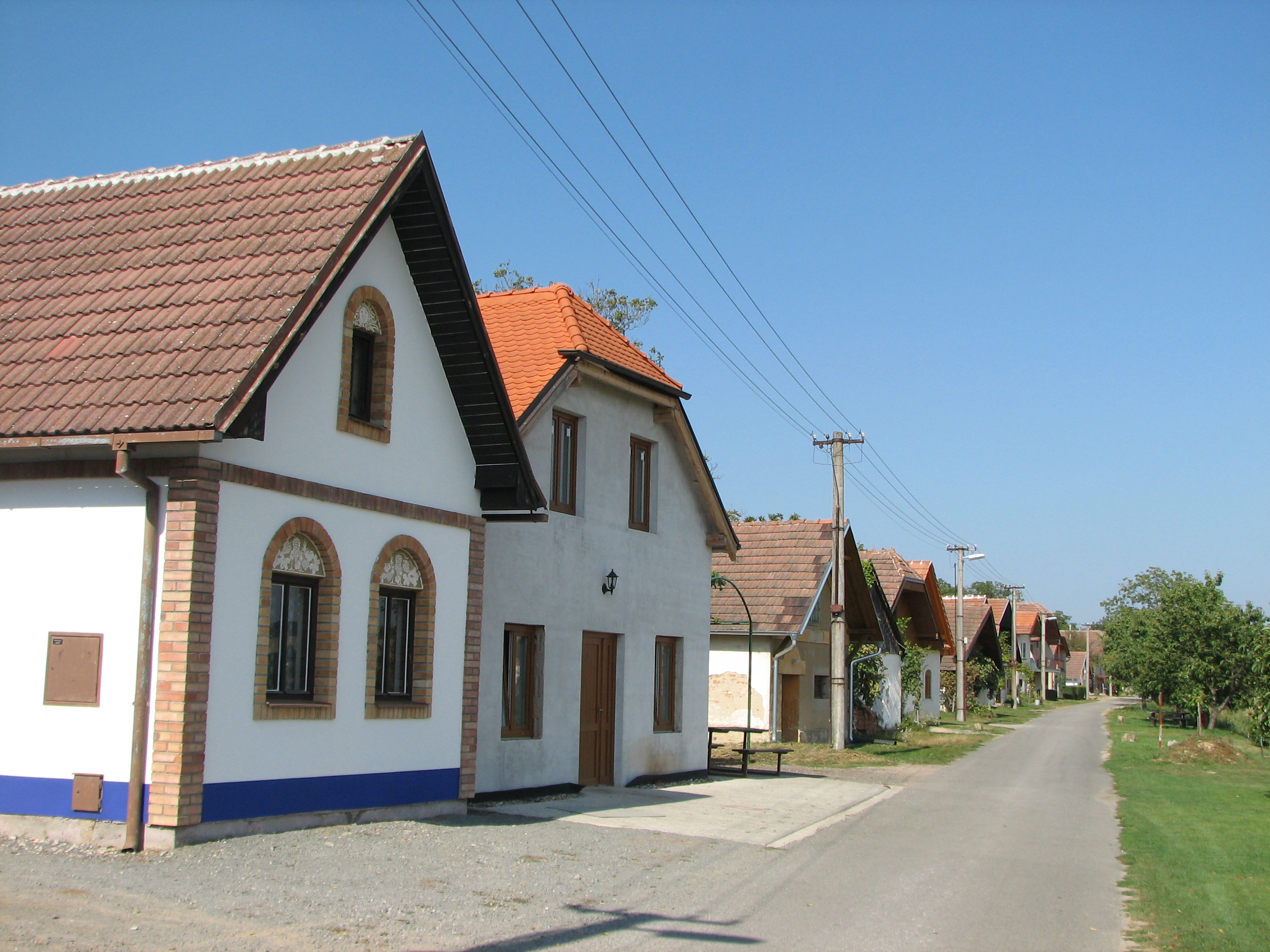
- Wine cellars

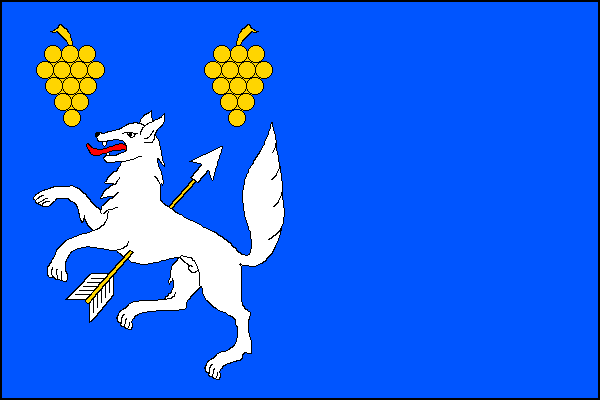
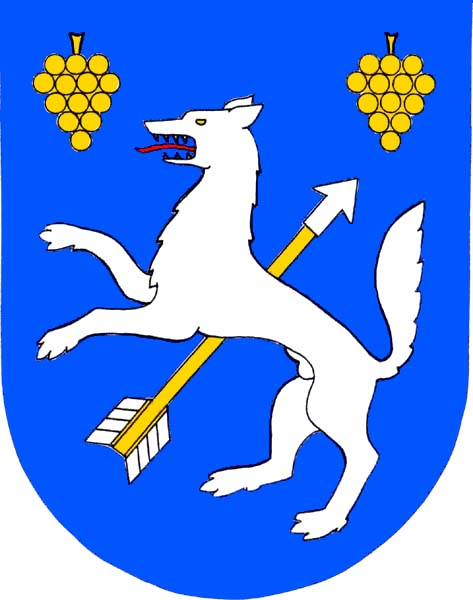
- Flag Coat of arms

- Location in the Czech Republic
- Coordinates: 48°59′23″N 17°9′49″E
- Country: Czech Republic
- Region: South Moravian
- District: Hodonín
- First mentioned: 1248

Area
  - Total: 8.64 km^{2} (3.34 sq mi)
- Elevation: 197 m (646 ft)

Population (2026-01-01)
  - Total: 1,007
  - Density: 117/km^{2} (302/sq mi)
- Time zone: UTC+1 (CET)
  - Summer (DST): UTC+2 (CEST)
- Postal code: 696 41
- Website: www.vlkos.cz

Vlkoš is a municipality and village in Hodonín District in the South Moravian Region of the Czech Republic. It has about 1,000 inhabitants.

Vlkoš lies approximately 17 kilometres (11 mi) north of Hodonín, 47 km (29 mi) south-east of Brno, and 233 km (145 mi) south-east of Prague.

== Demographics ==
Historical population
| Year | Pop. | ±% |
|---|---|---|
| 1869 | 752 | — |
| 1880 | 825 | +9.7% |
| 1890 | 840 | +1.8% |
| 1900 | 905 | +7.7% |
| 1910 | 910 | +0.6% |
| 1921 | 931 | +2.3% |
| 1930 | 963 | +3.4% |
| 1950 | 940 | −2.4% |
| 1961 | 1,038 | +10.4% |
| 1970 | 1,052 | +1.3% |
| 1980 | 1,034 | −1.7% |
| 1991 | 1,077 | +4.2% |
| 2001 | 1,034 | −4.0% |
| 2011 | 1,011 | −2.2% |
| 2021 | 997 | −1.4% |
Source: Censuses

== Notable people ==
- Sergěj Ingr (1894–1956), army general and Minister of National Defense
