= Vojtěch Mastný =

Czech lawyer and diplomat (1874–1954)

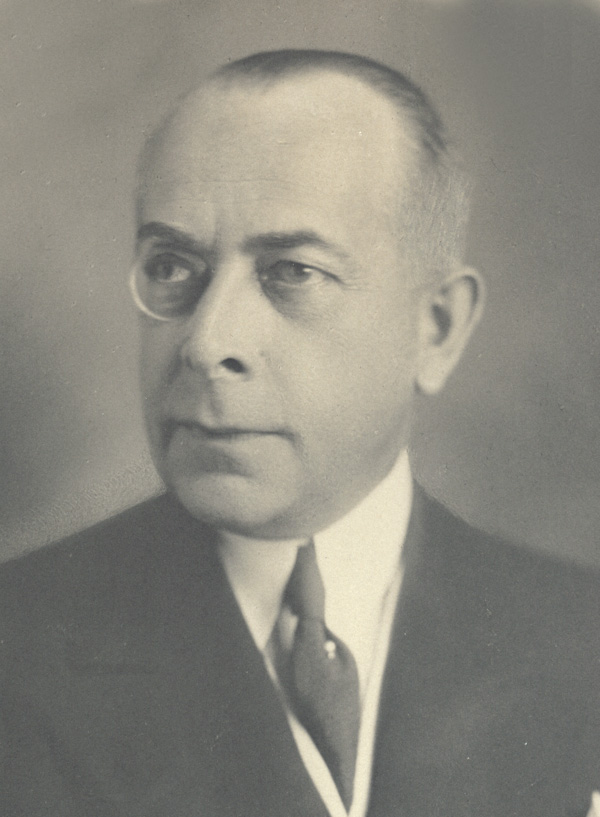
- Vojtěch Mastný in 1928

Czechoslovak Ambassador to Germany
- In office 1932–1939
- President: Tomáš Garrigue Masaryk; Edvard Beneš

Personal details
- Born: 18 March 1874 Prague, Austria-Hungary
- Died: 25 January 1954 (aged 79) Prague, Czechoslovakia
- Resting place: Olšany Cemetery

Vojtěch Mastný (18 March 1874 – 25 January 1954) was a Czech lawyer and diplomat of the First Czechoslovak Republic.

== Lawyer ==
Mastný was born into a wealthy family in Prague, the son of Vojtěch Mastný senior and Paula Steiner-Schmidt. Mastný's father had built a successful textile mill in Lomnice nad Popelkou, making him into a very well-off man. In 1868, Mastný senior founded the Živnostenská banka, the first commercial bank in the Austrian Empire to be owned by ethnic Czechs instead of ethnic Germans. The Živnostenská banka was a highly profitable bank, making the Mastný family into one of the richest families in Prague. From 1892 to 1898, Mastný studied philosophy and the law at Charles University, graduating with a degree in the law. Mastný then went to Paris to study at the Sorbonne. On 27 June 1899, he married Zdenka Kodlová. In 1900, the couple went on a grand tour of Europe. Mastný was a successful lawyer on the Provincial Committee of the Kingdom of Bohemia.

== Diplomat ==
After the Czechoslovak declaration of independence in 1918, there was a shortage of Czechs with the necessary experience to serve as diplomats (a profession dominated by the aristocracy at the time). Mastný with background in the law was recruited to join the diplomatic corps of the new republic. From 1920 to 1925, he served as the Czechoslovak minister-plenipotentiary in London and then from 1925 to 1932 as the minister-plenipotentiary in Rome.

From 1932 to 1939, Mastný served as the minister-plenipotentiary in Berlin with his official title being minister-plenipotentiary of the Republic of Czechoslovakia to the German Reich. On 17 May 1933, Mastný submitted a note of protest to the Baron Konstantin von Neurath, against the beatings of Czechoslovak citizens visiting Nazi Germany, complaining that since January of that year, dozens upon dozens of Czechoslovaks had been beaten for speaking either Czech or Slovak. In July 1933, as the attacks had not ceased, Mastný visited the Reich Chancellery to personally present Adolf Hitler with another note of protest.

On 29 February 1936, Mastný met with Hermann Göring who suggested that the main problem in Czechoslovak-German relations was the Franco-Czechoslovak alliance, and that the Reich was willing to work for better relations with Czechoslovakia. After the remilitarization of the Rhineland on 7 March 1936, President Edvard Beneš felt that better relations with Germany were a necessity. The remiltarization of the Rhineland allowed Germany to start building the Siegfried Line along the French border, thereby ending the hope of a French Armed Forces offensive into western Germany if Germany invaded Czechoslovakia. On 14 August 1936, Mastný started talks with Albrecht Haushofer of the Dienststelle Ribbentrop. Haushofer demanded that Beneš allow autonomy for the Sudetenland in exchange for German recognition of the current border; an end to the tariff war between Germany and Czechoslovakia and an agreement that newspapers in the two nations stop criticizing each other. Joining the talks were Count Maximilian zu Trauttmannsdorff.

By 18 October 1936, the talks had proceeded well enough for Beneš to invite Haushofer and Trauttmannsdorff to come to Prague to see him at Prague Castle. On 13–14 November 1936, Haushofer and Trauttmannsdorff met with Beneš at the Castle. Beneš indicated that he was willing to sign the agreement, but would not renounce Czechoslovakia's alliances with France and the Soviet Union as the Germans wanted. Through Mastný supported the agreement, Neurath was opposed and advised Hitler to reject it. Mastný was very hopeful at the agreement would be signed sometime in early 1937 and Beneš had a draft treaty prepared in January 1937. The talks suddenly stopped in February 1937 largely because Hitler did not want autonomy for the Sudetenland, which would deprive him of a possible excuse to attack Czechoslovakia.

In May 1937, Mastný first met the new British ambassador in Berlin, Sir Nevile Henderson, a man whom he deeply disliked. Mastný described Henderson as a man whose arrogance was limitless, and whose limited understanding of the Sudetenland issue was extremely pro-German. Mastný also reported that a recent imperial conference in London did not bode well for Czechoslovakia as the Dominion prime ministers all spoke against British involvement with Czechoslovakia. Mastný also complained about a memo by the chemist Arthur Pillans Laurie that had been handed out to the Dominion prime ministers, which he called tendentiously pro-German and full of lies about conditions in the Sudetenland. In his memo, Laurie claimed that the Sudeten German children were starving as he maintained that the Czechs were vacuuming up all of the wealth of the Sudeten Germans, thereby causing their children to die of hunger.

In March 1938, Mastný was invited to a ball at the "airman's house" as the Göring residence in Berlin was known. Hermann Göring told Mastný: "Germany has no unfriendly intentions towards Czechoslovakia and that on the contrary after the completion of the Anschluss, it expects an improvement in relations with it-as long as you don't mobilize". Mastný himself did not believe Göring's claims. When the Runciman mission under Lord Runicman was sent out in July 1938 to mediate between the Sudeten German leader Konrad Henlein and President Beneš, Mastný contacted Lord Runicman with the message that "Pan-Germanism must be stopped".

On 29–30 September 1938, Mastný attended the Munich Conference as an "observer" for "information only" with no power to be actually involved in the conference. When it was announced that an international conference would be held in Munich on 29 September 1938, Beneš had wanted Czechoslovakia to be represented in Munich by Jan Masaryk, the minister in London, and Štefan Osuský, the minister in Paris. Both Masaryk and Osuský declined the offer, leading to Mastný and Hubert Masařík, a counsellor in the foreign minister being appointed co-heads of the Czechoslovak delegation. Beneš had believed at first that Czechoslavkia would be allowed to take part in the conference and his orders were to "hold firm!". Mastný went to Prague to receive his instructions from Beneš and together with Masařík left Prague for Munich at about 3 pm together with a code-writer and an assistant. As Mastný boarded the airplane to take him to Munich, the diplomat Max Lobkowicz told him: "not to abandon Bohemia's thousand year old frontiers". When Mastný arrived at Munich Airport, he was greeted by dozens upon dozens of policemen, Gestapo agents, and SS men who made it clear that he was not welcome to Bavaria. As Mastný was driven to his hotel, crowds in the streets shouted out "die Tschechen kommen!". The motor convoy was made of police armored cars and upon his arrival at the Hotel Regina, Mastný discovered that he was a virtual prisoner as the policemen and the SS men told him that he was not to leave the hotel without their permission for his "own safety". Mastný also discovered that he was only to be "observer" and there was no question of him actually taking part in the conference.

The British delegation led by Prime Minister Neville Chamberlain was also staying at the Hotel Regina, and Mastný attempted to contact them, only to find that Chamberlain had already gone to meet Hitler at the Führerbau, where Hitler stayed whenever he was visiting Munich. After some difficult, Mastný was able via phone to get into contact with Frank Ashton-Gwatkin of the British delegation, who agreed to come over to Hotel Regina to discuss the situation. Ashton-Gwatkin hinted that the agreement being discussed would not be favorable to Czechoslovakia and told Mastný and Masařík not be difficult as Hitler was a hard man to negotiate with.

At the conclusion of the conference, Mastný was given the final text of the Munich Agreement alongside a note reading "If you do not accept, you will have to organize your affairs with Germany yourself" by the British delegates Horace Wilson and Ashton-Gwatkin. Mastný famously shouted "But what is the choice - between murder and suicide!" After the Munich Agreement was signed, an international mission was formed to supervise the transfer of the districts of the Sudetenland in stages over the course of October 1938. The chairman of the commission was Baron Ernst von Weizsäcker, the State Secretary of the Auswärtiges Amt, and the other members were Mastný, Henderson, the French ambassador André François-Poncet and the Italian ambassador Baron Bernardo Attolico. Henderson recalled that the meetings of the commission "confused and frequently noisy" while another British diplomat called the meetings of the commission a "shouting march". In October 1938, Jiří Stříbrný, one of Beneš's most bitterest critics published a book that denounced the former president's handling of foreign policy as leading to the Munich Agreement. Mastný despite serving as diplomat joined the chorus of criticism along with Štefan Osuský and František Chvalkovský. The principle targets besides Beneš was the former foreign minister Kamil Krofta.

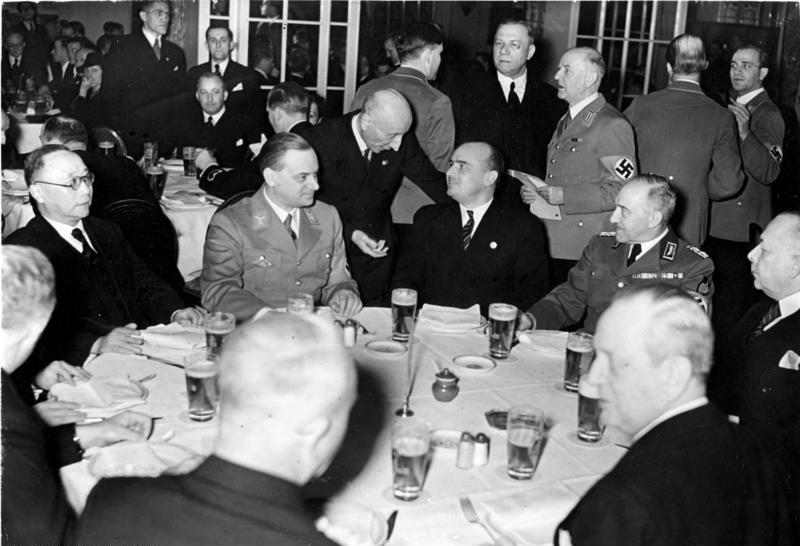
Mastný sitting extreme right on the table at a press conference hosted by Alfred Rosenberg, 8 February 1939. The Chinese ambassador Chen Jie is to the left of Rosenberg while the Economics Minister Walther Funk is to his right.

Under the terms of the Munich Agreement, Czecho-Slovakia (as the country had been renamed in October 1938) was supposed to receive a joint "guarantee" to provide protection from further aggression. On 2 March 1939, the German Foreign Minister Joachim von Ribbentrop issued a note to the British charge d'affairs George Ogilvie-Forbes (who was the acting ambassador as Henderson was being treated for cancer in Britain) and the French ambassador Robert Coulondre declaring that the Reich saw "an extension of this guarantee obligation to the Western powers not only no factor for the appeasement" but instead "a further element likely to strength wild tendencies, as has been the case in the past". The note declared that the German government regarded Czecho-Slovakia as "primarily within the sphere of the most important interests of the German Reich, not only from the historical point of view, but in the light of geographical and above all economic necessity". Coulondre in a report to Paris wrote that "translated from the diplomatic language", the note stated that neither Britain nor France had "no longer any right to interest themselves in Central European affairs". Mastný, who had been informed of the contents of the note by Coulondre, reported bitterly that Germany would not be joining in any "guarantee", but was also opposed to Britain and France issuing a "guarantee". Mastný noted that Ribbentrop's note stated that Czecho-Slovakia first had to improve relations with both Poland and Hungary first (nations that were unfriendly towards Czecho-Slovakia) before Germany would issue a "guarantee", but not Romania, a nation that Czecho-Slovakia had friendly relations with was not mentioned, which he felt indicated bad faith on the part of the Germans.

== Under the occupation ==
On 15 March 1939, Germany occupied the Czech half of Czecho-Slovakia and the Czechoslovak legation in Berlin was closed. Mastný retired to Prague. Mastný resumed his duties with the Živnostenská banka, sitting on its board of directors. Mastný knew the Reichsprotektor of the Protectorate of Bohemia and Moravia, Baron Konstantin von Neurath, who served as the German foreign minister from 1932 to 1938. Several times, Mastný interceded with Neurath, asking him to commute the death sentences he had imposed on Czech resistance fighters to life imprisonment. On 23 January 1944, Mastný took part in the founding congress in Prague of the League Against Bolshevism, a Nazi front organization, which led to accusations of collaboration.

== Last years ==
After the liberation of 1945, Mastný was briefly imprisoned by the Red Army as a collaborator, but was not prosecuted because of his age. Under the Communist regime, all of Mastný's assets were confiscated, forcing him to work as a language teacher to support himself. Mastný spent his last years writing his memoirs, which were confiscated in 1959 by the police, and not finally published until 1990 as the Memoirs of a Diplomat.
