= Gendarmerie (Czechoslovakia) =

Interwar paramilitary unit

- Četnictvo
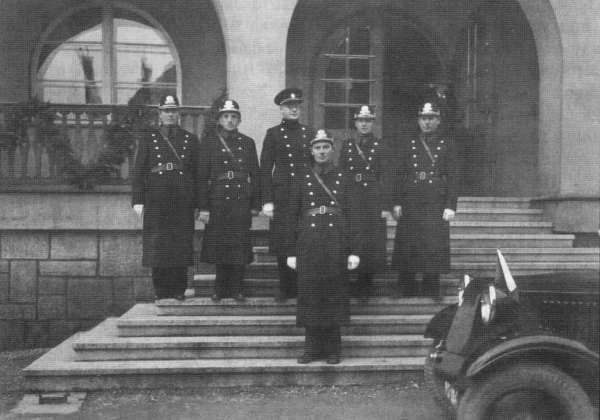
- Czechoslovak gendarmes, pictured c. 1930
- Founded: April 14, 1920 (Note: Date of legal regularization from an already operational force)
- Disbanded: March 16, 1939 (Note: Date of de facto deconstitution of the Czechoslovak state; operationally continued as an agency of the successor Protectorate of Bohemia and Moravia)
- Allegiance: Czechoslovakia
- Role: Internal security
- Size: 12,657 (1933)
- Headquarters: Prague
- Engagements: Clash at Habersbirk

Insignia
- Coat of arms

Aircraft flown
- Fighter: Škoda D-1
- Reconnaissance: Aero A.32

The Gendarmerie (Czech: Četnictvo) in the First Czechoslovak Republic was a paramilitary force responsible for law enforcement in rural areas, as well as anti-riot and counterinsurgency duties.

Inherited by Czechoslovakia from a predecessor force established by the Austro-Hungarian Empire in 1849, the Gendarmerie was subordinate to the Ministry of the Interior, though could be transferred to control of the Czechoslovak Army during time of war. By the early 1930s it had a strength of nearly 13,000 personnel. It saw action during the Sudeten German uprising of 1938, in which a number of gendarmes were killed in action.

Following the 1939 obliteration of the Czechoslovak state, the Gendarmerie continued as a paramilitary force of the Protectorate of Bohemia and Moravia, though veterans of the Czechoslovak Legion and Jews were dismissed from service. The Protectorate Gendarmerie both supported German security operations in the protectorate and aided the resistance. On 5 May 1945, gendarmerie forces — operating under the command of former Czechoslovak Army officer Jaroslav Záruba — responded to the call for aid broadcast by Czech Radio that marked the start of the Prague Uprising. Eight days later, on 13 May, gendarmes stormed the presidential residence of Lány Castle, bringing to an end the protectorate.

== History and operations ==
Service record
- Operations: 1920 general strike Polish–Czechoslovak border conflicts Sudeten German uprising

=== Predecessor ===
The Imperial-Royal Gendarmerie, modeled on the Gendarmerie Nationale of France, was originally established in 1849 in the Austro-Hungarian Empire as a component of the Imperial Austrian Army. In 1876, this force was made administratively separate from the army and was operationally divided into 14 regional commands. Of these, the 2nd regional command and 4th regional command were responsible for Bohemia and Moravia, respectively.

=== Establishment and early years ===
Local elements of the Austro-Hungarian gendarmerie passed to the control of independent Czechoslovakia following the Czechoslovak declaration of independence, operating under the provisions of transitional legislation that provided for the continuity of imperial statutes until those laws were repealed or amended. Ethnically German members of the Gendarmerie were permitted to continue to serve conditioned on their willingness to acquire the Czechoslovak language, however, new recruitment gave preference to men of Czech and Slovak ethnicity.

The Gendarmerie was legally regularized under act no. 299 of April 14, 1920. Also that year, the operating area of the Gendarmerie was extended beyond the former crown lands of Bohemia and Moravia to include Slovakia as well. Responsible for law enforcement in rural areas, anti-riot, and counterinsurgency duties, it was operationally part of the Ministry of the Interior, though gendarmes — known as "cetniks" — were subject to military law and discipline. During war, it was expected the Gendarmerie would be transferred to Czechoslovak Army command.

Beginning in the late 1920s, in the aftermath of the Gajda Affair, gendarmes became ineligible to vote in Czechoslovak elections; the entire Czechoslovak armed forces had been disenfranchised as a means of neutralizing their potential involvement in politics. Gendarmes were, additionally, not permitted to marry until completion of four years service.

=== Later years ===
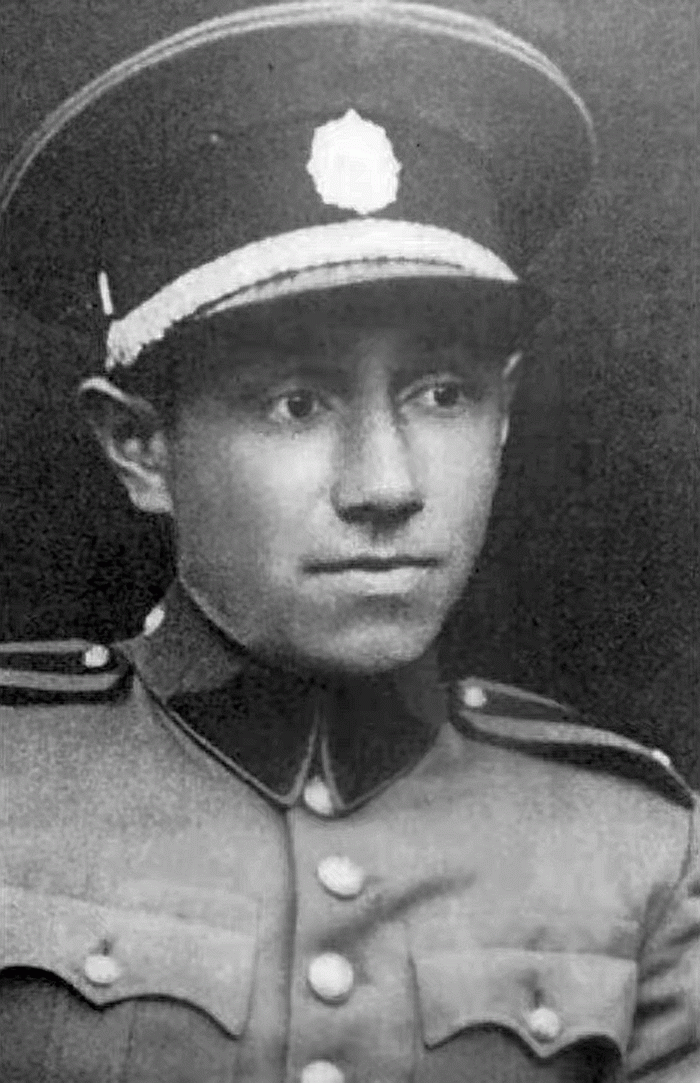
František Famfulík, chief of the gendarmerie station in Proseč, pictured in an undated photo. (Note: Famfulik was executed on July 8, 1943 by the SS after his involvement in resistance activities was discovered.)

Due to increasing tensions along the borders with Germany, Hungary, and Poland, a "State Defense Guard" was established in October 1936 composed of ad hoc battalions that could be rapidly assembled from among locally garrisoned gendarmes, soldiers, and police to operate as a tripwire force against external threats until regular units of the Czechoslovak Army could mobilize and intervene. By 1937, 31 such battalions had been established in border areas.

On September 13, 1938, the Gendarmerie engaged the Sudetendeutsches Freikorps in the Clash at Habersbirk, during which gendarmes Jan Koukol, Antonín Křepeli, Vladimír Černý and Stanislav Roubal were killed. Soon after, eight gendarmes were killed in a firefight with the Freikorps in Bublava, with the Sudetens going on to occupy the local gendarmerie station. In total, the Gendarmerie and other State Defense Guard forces suffered 37 fatalities and 132 non-fatal casualties during the Sudeten German uprising of September 1938.

Following the Munich Agreement, gendarmes were withdrawn from the Sudetenland in accordance with the terms of the compact, however, conflict continued for several weeks thereafter in salami attacks, including in ethnic minority enclaves well inside Czechoslovak territory. For instance, on October 31, the village of Moravská Chrastová was seized by several hundred members of the Sudeten German Party supported by four SS advisors. The village was subsequently recaptured by a Gendarmerie emergency unit supported by the Czechoslovak Army.

=== Transition to the Protectorate Gendarmerie ===
After the German occupation of the Czech lands and the creation of the Slovak Republic, the Gendarmerie came under the control of the government of the Protectorate of Bohemia and Moravia. During the early period of the protectorate, gendarmes continued to deal with communal violence. On 22 July 1939, for instance, Vlajka members conducted an organized attack on Jewish businesses in Prague. The Prague Municipal Police, backed by a Gendarmerie emergency unit, were unable to bring the situation under control and Protectorate officers had to summon Wehrmacht reinforcements to quell the violence.

In 1942, gendarmes from Vrbatův Kostelec began operating a radio transmitter near the village of Ležáky to maintain contact between the Czechoslovak government-in-exile and remnant Czechoslovak military forces and irregular troops active in the protectorate. After the failure of Operation Anthropoid, the Protectorate Gendarmerie provided operational support to the Gestapo-organized decimation of Lidice. Later, following a German-directed purge of Jewish gendarmes, gendarmes married to Jewish women, and gendarmes who were veterans of the Czechoslovak Legion, the "Protectorate Gendarmerie" was administratively consolidated with the civil police into the Uniformed Protectorate Police in 1943.

Gendarmerie provincial headquarters

On the morning of 5 May 1945, resistance supporters within the Prague Municipal Police assisted staff of Czech Radio to infiltrate the Czech Radio broadcasting center on Vinohradská Street. A firefight between police and German forces charged with guarding the building ensued. At 12:33 p.m., Czech Radio broadcast an appeal for assistance, marking the start of the Prague Uprising:

"We are calling on the Czech police, Czech gendarmes and the government's military forces to help Czech Radio."

Bartoš, the stay-behind military headquarters commanded by Gen. Karel Kutlvašr, subsequently ordered units of the Gendarmerie and the Government Army to seize control of key positions in the city from SS and Wehrmacht forces. On 13 May, on orders of Václav Nosek – serving as Interior Minister in the transitional Košice Government Program – gendarmes and police stormed the presidential residence of Lány Castle and arrested State President Emil Hacha, bringing to an end the protectorate.

== Organization and equipment ==
As of 1933, the Gendarmerie had a strength of 12,657 personnel, unevenly split between the four provinces of Bohemia, Moravia-Silesia, Slovakia and Subcarpathian Ruthenia, with provincial headquarters located in Prague, Brno, Bratislava, and Uzhhorod, respectively. Recruitment was on a voluntary basis and was limited to single men between the ages of 21 and 35. The entry training period was eight months.

Most gendarmes were posted in rural stations where they carried-out routine policing in areas outside of municipal boundaries, while law enforcement within municipal boundaries was the responsibility of city-maintained municipal police, or of the centrally-controlled State Police (in those cities which did not maintain a municipal police service). In addition, a number of specialized units existed.

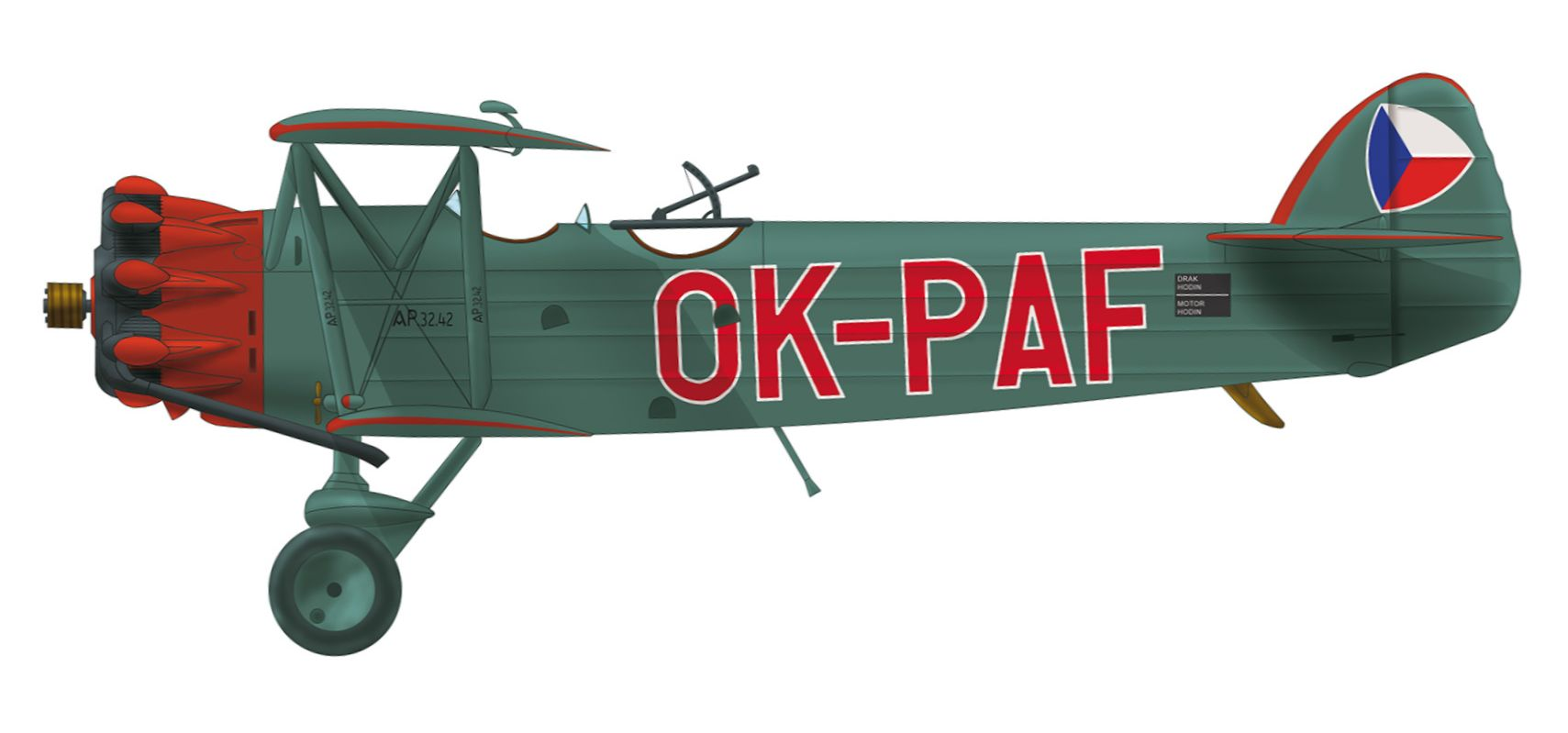
An Aero A.32 observation aircraft in the livery of the Gendarmerie air wing

Gendarmerie emergency units, sometimes called "alert groups", were organized into barracked companies of 43 personnel and were garrisoned in major cities — as well as areas with large ethnic minority populations — to provide riot control and the capability to rapidly respond to militarized threats. By 1930, 30 such emergency units had been raised. In addition to individual small arms, each emergency unit was equipped with two light machine guns.

The air wing of the Gendarmerie, created in 1935, operated Škoda D-1 fighters and Aero A.32 observation aircraft. As of 1938, it had 27 pilots.

In addition to the emergency units and air wing, the Gendarmerie also operated several "search units" for fugitive retrieval and "traffic control units" for motorway safety.

=== Uniforms ===
Gendarmerie uniforms were patterned in a grey-green color, though gendarmes assigned to office duties might also wear civilian attire.

=== Ranks ===
Officer ranks (1937–1939)
Generál	Plukovník	Podplukovník	Major	Štábní kapitán	Kapitán	Nadporučík	Poručík	Podporučík
General	Colonel	Lieutenant; Colonel	Major	Staff; Captain	Captain	First; Lieutenant	Lieutenant	Ensign

Enlisted ranks (1937–1939)
Praporčík	Štábní; Strážmistr	Strážmistr	Závodčí	Četař	Desátník	Svobodník
Warrant; Officer	Staff; Constable	Constable	Corporal of the Guard	Sergeant	Corporal	Private

== In popular culture ==
The 2001–2007 Czech television series Četnické humoresky — which starred Tomáš Töpfer — is a comedy crime drama set in a Gendarmerie station near Brno in the 1930s.

The 2017 Czech television series Četníci z Luhačovic — which starred Pavel Zedníček — is a crime drama which follows two Gendarmerie recruits assigned to a station in Luhačovice in the 1920s.

== Notable personnel ==
- Jan Klán

== See also ==
- Gendarmerie (Austria)
- Czechoslovak Air Force
