= Kostelec =

Kostelec may refer to places in the Czech Republic:

- Kostelec (Jičín District), a municipality and village in the Hradec Králové Region
- Kostelec (Jihlava District), a municipality and village in the Vysočina Region
- Kostelec (Hodonín District), a municipality and village in the South Moravian Region
- Kostelec (Tachov District), a municipality and village in the Plzeň Region
- Kostelec, a village and part of Fulnek in the Moravian-Silesian Region
- Kostelec, a village and part of Hluboká nad Vltavou in the South Bohemian Region
- Kostelec, a village and part of Hromnice in the Plzeň Region
- Kostelec, a village and part of Zlín in the Zlín Region
- Kostelec na Hané, a town in the Olomouc Region
- Kostelec nad Černými lesy, a town in the Central Bohemian Region
- Kostelec nad Labem, a town in the Central Bohemian Region
- Kostelec nad Orlicí, a town in the Hradec Králové Region
- Kostelec nad Vltavou, a municipality and village in the South Bohemian Region
- Kostelec u Heřmanova Městce, a municipality and village in the Pardubice Region
- Kostelec u Holešova, a municipality and village in the Zlín Region
- Kostelec u Křížků, a municipality and village in the Central Bohemian Region
- Červený Kostelec, a town in the Hradec Králové Region
- Vrbatův Kostelec, a municipality and village in the Pardubice Region
