= Sudeten German uprising =

Pro-German rebellion against Czechoslovak government

- Part of the prelude to World War II
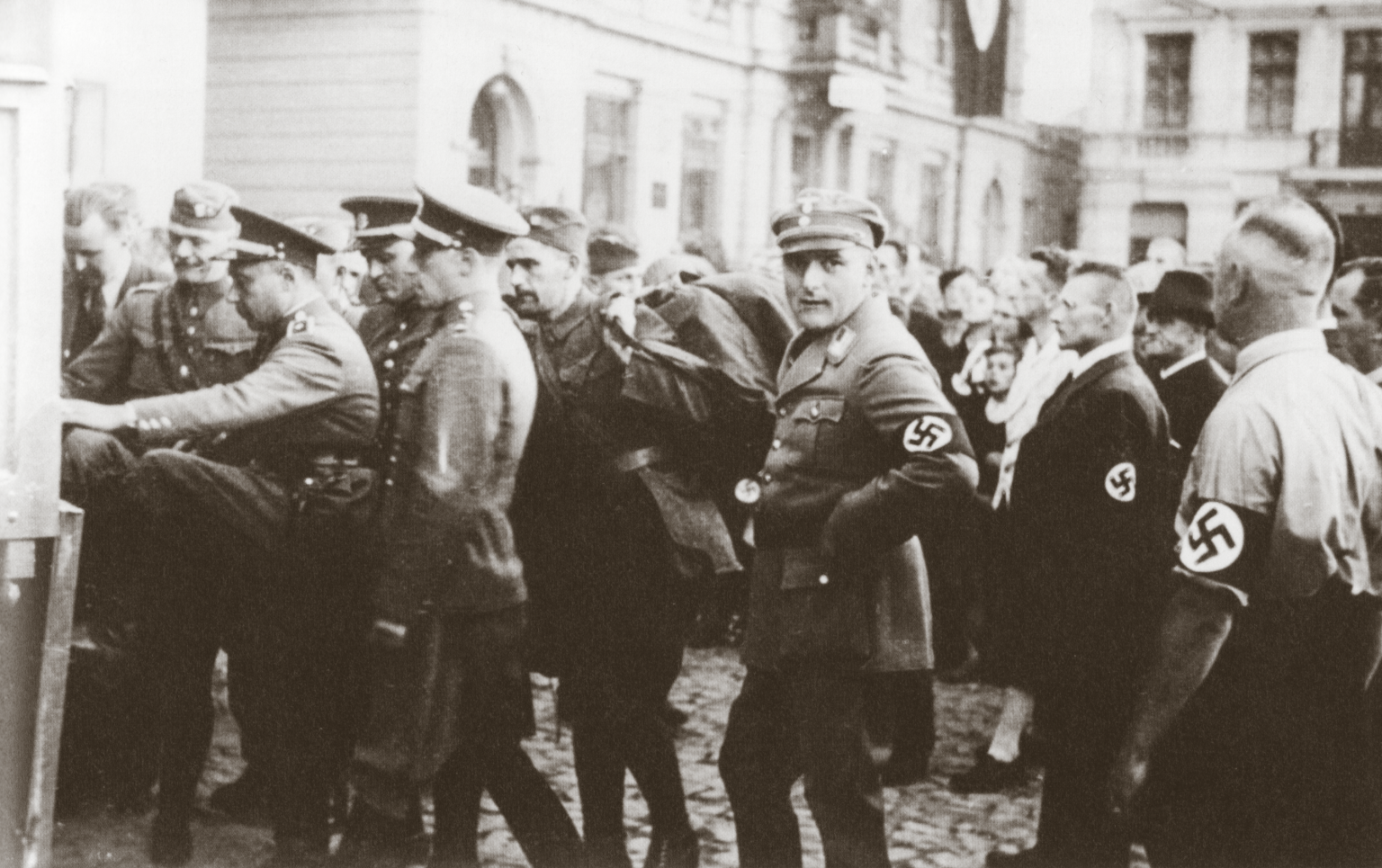
- Sudeten German insurgents escorting captured Czechoslovak servicemen
Date	12/13 September – October 1938
Location	Sudetenland, Czechoslovakia
Result	Uprising partially suppressed (See Aftermath)

Belligerents
Sudeten Germans; SdP sympathisers; Freikorps; Grüne Korps; Supported by: Germany; Schutzstaffel; Sturmabteilung; Abwehr	Czechoslovakia; Czechoslovak Army; State Defence Guard; Republikanische Wehr

Commanders and leaders
Konrad Henlein; Karl Hermann Frank; Anton Pfrogner; Friedrich Köchling; Wilhelm Canaris	(Czechoslovakia) Jan Syrový (Czechoslovakia) Ludvík Krejčí (Czechoslovakia) Bohuslav Fiala

Strength
Freikorps: 10–15,000 (18 September); 26,000 (22 September); 34–41,000 (1 October)	State Defence Guard: 30,000 (22 September)

Casualties and losses
Freikorps: as of 1 October according to Köchling; 52 dead, 65 wounded, 19 missing Total: according to Frajdl c. 200 dead	Security forces: 95 dead: 69 in September, 26 in October; hundreds wounded Civilians: unknown (Note: As stated by Suchánek and Beneš: "Nowadays, no one can figure up the [exact] number of killed Czechoslovak civilians."); Total: as of 1 October according to Köchling; 110 dead, 2,029 captured (Note: This figure includes servicemen, railwaymen, postal officers and members of their families.)

Sudeten German uprising (Czech: sudetoněmecké povstání) (Note: The term sudetoněmecké povstání is used by these sources: Other sources use terms such as povstání Němců v Čechách a na Moravě, povstání českých Němců, or povstání sudetoněmeckého obyvatelstva.) in September 1938 was a rebellion of Sudeten Germans against Czechoslovak authorities in Sudetenland, supported by an organized action orchestrated by Sudeten German Party (SdP) chaired by Konrad Henlein. Therefore, the uprising is also referred to as the Henlein's coup (or coup attempt; Czech: henleinovský puč).

== First phase ==
On 10 September 1938, all district organizations of the SdP received an order from Nuremberg to start protests and provocations. On 11 September, Henlein's supporters clashed with policemen and gendarmes in Cheb, Liberec, Teplice, and other places. On the evening of 12 September, Sudeten Germans listened en masse to Hitler's radio speech accusing Czechoslovakia of torturing and oppressing the German minority. This speech sparked a wave of violence against Czechs, Jews and Sudeten German anti-fascists in the borderlands. On the morning of 13 September, the pre-planned armed uprising began with incidents such as the clash at Habersbirk and the first casualties being reported, amounting to 37 dead as of 15 September. By 14 September, the uprising was partially suppressed due to declaration of martial law, deployment of the military and reinforcement of the State Defence Guard. Nevertheless, unrest in the border regions continued.

== Second phase ==
Following the failed coup, the second phase of uprising began on 17 September with activities of Sudetendeutsches Freikorps, a paramilitary organization of Sudeten Germans formed in Germany. Its task was to continue fighting and conducting terrorist acts. According to the 1944 declaration of Czechoslovak government-in-exile, Czechoslovakia was in a state of war with the Third Reich from 17 September 1938. After numerous shootouts on 20 and 21 September, the rebellion broke again on 22 September when riots flared in other areas of Moravia and Silesia. In some cases, regular German units of Abwehr, SA and SS participated in combat, terrorist and sabotage actions.

Czechoslovak authorities responded by securing the border with Germany. Mobile army units reinforced by LT-35 light tanks and armoured cars restored order in regions such as Cheb, Frýdlant, Šluknov, or Varnsdorf, resulting in a decline of insurgency activities. Realising what the Freikorps had done, many Sudeten Germans escaped across the border into Germany. Following the stepping up of Hitler's demands, mobilization of the Czechoslovak army was carried out on 23 September. Several counter-insurgency actions had to be revoked because the military units assumed defensive positions further inland.

== Aftermath ==
With the signing of Munich Agreement (30 September 1938) the uprising was practically over, yet the violent incidents occurred occasionally even in October, the last one in Moravská Chrastová on 31 October. On 30 September, combat actions of the Freikorps were formally ended by an order No. 30. Nevertheless, Henlein's supporters continued in their attacks on retreating Czechoslovaks. On 1 October, Freikorps issued an order to “eliminate fleeing leftists and Czechs.” More than 200,000 people, mostly Czechs but also Jews and Sudeten German anti-fascists, fled from Sudetenland in fear of the Nazis.

== See also ==
- Fifth column
- Expulsion of Germans from Czechoslovakia

== Sources ==
- Bružeňák, Vladimír; Macke, Josef (2017). Morový rok : kronika tragického roku 1938 na Sokolovsku a Karlovarsku - 1. díl - Sokolovsko [Plague Year: a chronicle of the tragic year of 1938 in Sokolov and Karlovy Vary regions - Volume 1 - Sokolov Region] (in Czech). Cheb: Svět křídel. ISBN 978-80-7573-021-3.
- Bružeňák, Vladimír; Macke, Josef (2017). Morový rok : kronika tragického roku 1938 na Sokolovsku a Karlovarsku - 2. díl - Karlovarsko [Plague Year: a chronicle of the tragic year of 1938 in Sokolov and Carlsbad regions - Volume 2 - Carlsbad Region] (in Czech). Cheb: Svět křídel. ISBN 978-80-7573-025-1.
- Hruška, Emil (2013). Boj o pohraničí : Sudetoněmecký Freikorps v roce 1938 [Conflict in Borderlands: Sudetendeutsches Freikorps in 1938] (in Czech). Prague: Nakladatelství Epocha a Pražská vydavatelská společnost. ISBN 978-80-7425-194-8.
- Junek, Václav (2013). Hitler před branami : literární dokument o povstání Němců v Čechách a na Moravě v roce 1938 a o cestě k němu [Hitler at the Gates: literary documentary about the uprising of the Germans in Bohemia and Moravia in 1938 and the path to it] (in Czech). Velké Přílepy: Olympia. ISBN 978-80-7376-349-7.
- Junek, Václav (2016). Malé (velké) války 20. století a dál... [Small (Large) Wars of 20th Century and Beyond] (in Czech). Prague: Petrklíč. ISBN 978-80-7229-322-3.
- Motl, Stanislav (2015). Válka před válkou : krvavý podzim 1938 v Čechách a na Moravě [War Before The War: bloody autumn of 1938 in Bohemia and Moravia] (in Czech). Prague: Rybka Publishers. ISBN 978-80-87950-21-0.
- Suchánek, Jiří; Beneš, Jaroslav (2018). Mobilizace ve fotografii : Armáda a Stráž obrany státu v letech 1938–1939 [Mobilization in Photography: Army and the State Defence Guard 1938–1939] (in Czech). Brno: Extra Publishing. ISBN 978-80-7525-159-6.
- Šrámek, Pavel (2008). Ve stínu Mnichova : z historie československé armády 1932-1939 [In the Shadow of Munich: From the History of Czechoslovak Army 1932–1939] (in Czech). Prague: Mladá fronta. ISBN 978-80-204-1848-7.
