= Vienna inflation riot =

Riots in 1911 in Vienna, Austria-Hungary

- Pictures of the Vienna inflation riot (Austrian newspapers Die Neue Zeitung, 18 September 1911)
- Date: 17 September 1911
- Location: city centre and Ottakring district, Vienna, Austria-Hungary
- Caused by: increasing food prices
- Result: Police and military suppression

Parties
Social Democratic Workers' Party of Austria	Employers Police: Imperial-Royal Gendarmerie; Armed forces: Austro-Hungarian Army; 24th Infantry Regiment; 1st Bosnian Infantry Regiment

Casualties
- Deaths: 4
- Injuries: at least 149 citizens
- Arrested: 448
- Damage: Public and private property in Vienna centre and Ottakring

The Vienna inflation revolt, also known as the September riots, were riots following the labour demonstration and its violent suppression in Vienna on 17 September 1911. The event is marked as the bloodiest street clash in the history of the Austrian Empire since the 1848 October Uprising, as shots were fired on demonstrators for the first time in Vienna since 1848.

== Prelude ==
Between 1909 and 1910 drought-related crop failures in Austria-Hungary and high world market prices for foodstuffs led to price increase for food, bread especially. The price of flour almost doubled, and meat became almost unaffordable for workers. The already dire housing situation was further exacerbated by rising rents. The traditional working-class district of Ottakring, the center of the protests during the later revolt, had a particularly high proportion of substandard housing, with some houses severely overcrowded.

== Demonstration ==
In this public atmosphere, left-wing Social Democratic Workers' Party of Austria decided to call up a protest demonstration, which took place on Sunday, 17 September 1911 at the Vienna's City Hall Square (Rathausplatz). The event started around 10:00 a.m. by speeches of politicians Franz Schuhmeier and Albert Sever, as well as delegates from Italy and Bohemia, pointing out threats for the livelihoods of workers. According to the police report, 36,000 people gathered in the front of the city hall, while organizers claimed number of 100,000 participants. Order was guarded by a large Imperial-Royal Gendarmerie contingent, enforced by a division of cavalry (dragoons, lancers and hussars), as well as several battalions of Hungarian and Bosniak infantry, deployed in the city center.

== Riots ==
As the peaceful demonstration dispersed around 1:00 p.m., a shot was allegedly fired from the Palais Epstein, at that time the seat of the Administrative Court. The shooter was never identified, a shot fired from within the crowd is also considered a possibility. This unleashed panic and rage in the crowd: while some started to run away, others threw stones at the Palais and the City Hall windows, shattering many.

Police and military, including the Deutschmeister Regiment, then advanced against the demonstrators and pushed them towards Neubau and Mariahilfer streets. The hard core of the demonstrators then retreated from the City Hall to the working-class district of Ottakring. There, the demonstrators erected barricades and vandalized government buildings. Incidents of looting also occurred at the place. Public security officials reacted by declaring a state of emergency in Ottakring and deploying more troops on site. Several buildings, including schools, and streetcars caught fire. The demonstrations and street battles continued until 10:00 p.m., when police and military finally occupied and sealed off the whole district.

== Aftermath ==
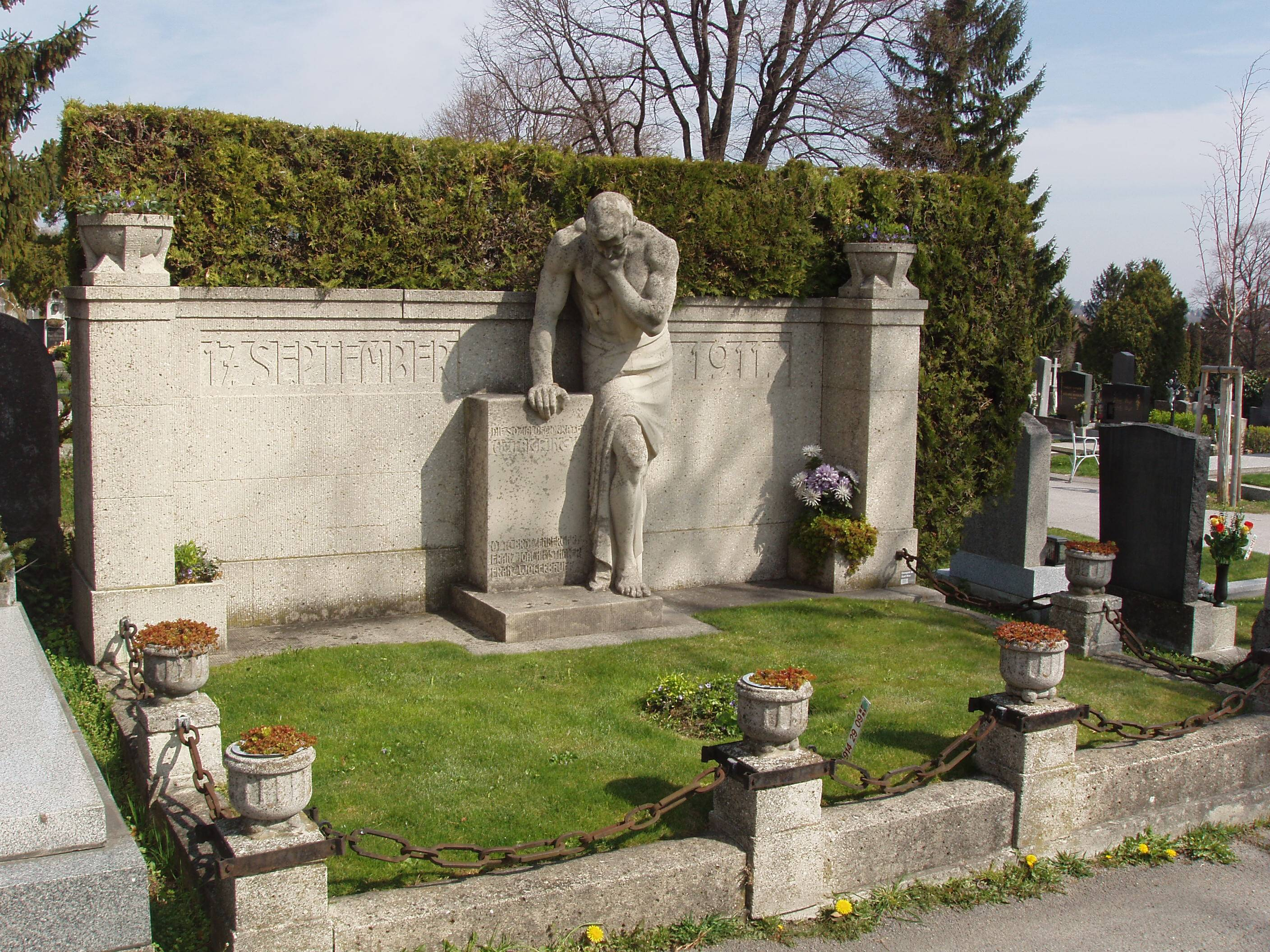
Memorial at the Ottakring Cemetery

The riot cost lives of four workers: Otto Brötzenberger, Franz Joachimsthaler, Leopold Lechner, and Franz Wögerbauer. Joachimsthaler, after a stomach gunshot wound, and Wögerbauer, cut by a sabre, died after few days in Viennese Sophia's Hospital. In addition, at least 149 were injured. More than 488 people were arrested, from which 283 were sentenced to long prison terms. The trials began just two days after the demonstration, 19 September, concluded within a short time with the conviction of all the accused. Justice Minister Viktor von Hochenburger even had bypassed the jury courts, which were standardly responsible for “political crimes,” and instructed the prosecutors to request severe sentences.

On October 5, 1911, a aftermath parliamentary discussion was brought up in the Austrian Imperial Council under the agenda item "Price Revolt,". Just as MP Victor Adler was blaming Hochenburger for the escalation of events, shots were fired from the visitors' gallery toward the government benches, narrowly missing Hochenburger and also Karl Stürgkh, his political ally. The shooter, the 20-year-old unemployed journeyman carpenter Nikola Njegos, was overpowered and sentenced to seven years in prison. He died while incarcerated. Under the pressure of all circumstances, Prime Minister Paul Gautsch gave his resignation, being replaced by Stürgkh.

At the Ottakring Cemetery, a monument donated by the Social Democrats commemorates the victims of the price gouging revolt. In 1928, the square in front of the Wilhelmina's Hospital (Wilhelminenspital, later Klinik Ottakring) was named after on of the victims, locksmith's apprentice Franz Joachimsthaler, Joachimsthalerplatz.

== See also ==
- Ottakring
- History of Vienna
- List of riots

== Biography ==
- Maderthaner, Wolfgang; Musner, Lutz (1999). Die Anarchie der Vorstadt: das andere Wien um 1900 (in German). Campus Verlag. p. 19. ISBN 978-3-593-36334-9.
