= Bohuslav Fiala =

Bohuslav Fiala may refer to:

- Bohuslav Fiala (canoeist), Czech slalom canoeist
- Bohuslav Fiala (general) (1890–1964), Czechoslovak brigadier general
