= August 1938 =

Month of 1938

<<	August 1938					>>
Su	Mo	Tu	We	Th	Fr	Sa
	1	2	3	4	5	6
7	8	9	10	11	12	13
14	15	16	17	18	19	20
21	22	23	24	25	26	27
28	29	30	31

The following events occurred in August 1938:

== August 1, 1938 (Monday) ==
- A new marriage and divorce law went into effect in Nazi Germany and Austria, depriving the church of all legal authority in marital affairs and entitling the state to prevent certain marriages.
- Born: Jacques Diouf, diplomat, in Senegal (d. 2019)
- Died: Edmund C. Tarbell, 76, American Impressionist painter; Konstantin Yurenev, 49 or 50, Soviet politician and diplomat (executed in the Great Purge)

== August 2, 1938 (Tuesday) ==
- The Brooklyn Dodgers and St. Louis Cardinals played with yellow baseballs in the first game of a doubleheader at Ebbets Field. The yellow dye was an experiment to see if players would see the ball better and reduce their chances of being hit by pitches. Most players agreed the yellow balls were easier to follow, but the dye tended to come off on the hands of the pitchers.

== August 3, 1938 (Wednesday) ==
- Runciman Mission: British envoy Lord Runciman arrived in Prague to confer with Sudeten German leaders.
- Italy announced its first anti-Jewish legislation, banning foreign Jews from Italian schools.
- Born: Terry Wogan, radio and television presenter, in Limerick, Ireland (d. 2016)

== August 4, 1938 (Thursday) ==
- The Romanian government gave minorities equal rights with Romanians in language, religion and race.
- Footballer Bryn Jones transferred from Wolves to Arsenal for a record £14,500 fee.
- Sherb Noble introduced Soft-Serve Ice Cream in his Kankakee, IL Ice Cream Parlor leading to the introduction of Dairy Queen two years later.
- Died: Pearl White, 49, American actress (liver failure)

== August 5, 1938 (Friday) ==
- New York City threw a ticker tape parade for Douglas Corrigan.
- The musical comedy film Alexander's Ragtime Band premiered at the Roxy Theatre in New York City.

== August 6, 1938 (Saturday) ==
- British Secretary of State for the Colonies Malcolm MacDonald made a one-day visit to Jerusalem to gain a firsthand understanding of the Arab revolt in Palestine.
- Died: Warner Oland, 58, Swedish-American actor best known for playing Charlie Chan

== August 7, 1938 (Sunday) ==
- Eduardo Santos became President of Colombia.
- The RMS Queen Mary set a record for east-to-west Atlantic crossing of 3 days, 23 hours and 48 minutes.
- Died: Konstantin Stanislavski, 75, Russian actor and theatre director

== August 8, 1938 (Monday) ==
- Construction of the Mauthausen-Gusen concentration camp in Upper Austria began.
- Born: Otto Rehhagel, footballer and coach, in Essen, Germany; Connie Stevens, actress, director and singer, in Brooklyn, New York

== August 9, 1938 (Tuesday) ==
- During the Battle of the Segre, Republican forces crossed the Segre and surprised Nationalist forces north of Lleida.
- The musical drama film Four Daughters starring the Lane Sisters was released.
- Born: Leonid Kuchma, 2nd President of Ukraine, in Novhorod-Siverskyi, Ukrainian SSR, Soviet Union; Rod Laver, tennis player, in Rockhampton, Australia; Burton Gilliam, actor, in Dallas, Texas

== August 10, 1938 (Wednesday) ==
- Nuremberg's synagogue was destroyed by the Nazis.
- The drama series Telecrime first aired on BBC Television.

== August 11, 1938 (Thursday) ==
- The Soviet Union and Japan agreed to an armistice after several weeks of border clashes known as the Battle of Lake Khasan. Fighting ceased at noon.
- Born: Vada Pinson, baseball player, in Memphis, Tennessee (d. 1995)
- Died: Wilhelm Heinrich Detlev Körner, 59, Prussian-born American illustrator

== August 12, 1938 (Friday) ==
- Hitler called up 750,000 German troops for an unprecedented series of military exercises.
- A head-to-head horse race for a $25,000 prize, hyped in advance as "one of the greatest match races of all time", was held between Seabiscuit and Ligaroti at Del Mar racetrack in California, broadcast nationwide over the radio. Seabiscuit narrowly won.
- Died: Sergey Pavlovich Kravkov, 65, Russian soil scientist and agricultural chemist

== August 13, 1938 (Saturday) ==
- A Czech Airlines Savoia-Marchetti S.73 crashed in Kiel, Germany, killing 16 of 17 aboard.
- The first Amateur World Series, a forerunner of the Baseball World Cup, began in England. Only two teams competed, Great Britain and the United States.
- Born: Bill Masterton, ice hockey player, in Winnipeg, Manitoba, Canada (d. 1968)

== August 14, 1938 (Sunday) ==
- The RMS Queen Mary set a record for the eastbound Atlantic crossing of 3 days 20 hours 42 minutes.
- The first Sturgis Motorcycle Rally was held in Sturgis, South Dakota.
- Died: Hugh Trumble, 71, Australian cricketer

== August 15, 1938 (Monday) ==
- A referendum on the Chaco Treaty with Bolivia was held in Paraguay. 91% of the voters approved the treaty.
- Born: Janusz Zajdel, science fiction author, in Warsaw, Poland (d. 1985)

== August 16, 1938 (Tuesday) ==
- British Secretary of War Leslie Hore-Belisha put thirteen generals on the retired list to inject younger blood into the high command. Harry Knox (age 64), George Jeffreys (60) and Hugh Elles (58) were among the retirees.
- Born: Buck Rodgers, baseball player, manager and coach, in Delaware, Ohio
- Died: Robert Johnson, 27, American blues musician

== August 17, 1938 (Wednesday) ==
- A decree in Nazi Germany required Jews bearing first names of "non-Jewish" origin to adopt an additional name: "Israel" for men and "Sara" for women.
- A secret decree in Nazi Germany declared the SS-Verfügungstruppe to be neither part of the police nor the Wehrmacht, but an independent force at Hitler's personal disposal.
- The play Thieves' Carnival by Jean Anouilh premiered at Théâtre des Artes in Paris.

== August 18, 1938 (Thursday) ==
- Switzerland decided to refuse entry to all refugees without a visa.
- U.S. President Franklin D. Roosevelt visited Canada where he received an honorary degree from Queen's University and dedicated the Thousand Islands Bridge.

== August 19, 1938 (Friday) ==
- The William Butler Yeats drama Purgatory premiered at the Abbey Theatre in Dublin.
- Born: Valentin Mankin, Olympic sailing champion, in Kiev, Ukrainian SSR, Soviet Union (d. 2014); Diana Muldaur, actress, in New York City

== August 20, 1938 (Saturday) ==
- Generalissimo Francisco Franco rejected a British proposal to withdraw foreign volunteer fighters from Spain.
- English athlete Sydney Wooderson ran a half-mile in a record 1 minute 49.2 seconds.
- The inaugural Amateur World Series ended; host country Britain won by defeating the United States in four of the five games.
- Ella Fitzgerald & Chick Webb topped the American popular music charts with a swinging jazz version of the children's nursery rhyme "A-Tisket, A-Tasket".
- Born: Alain Vivien, politician, in Melun, France

== August 21, 1938 (Sunday) ==
- Rudolf Caracciola won the Swiss Grand Prix.
- Born: Kenny Rogers, singer-songwriter and producer, in Houston, Texas (d. 2020)

== August 22, 1938 (Monday) ==
- Hitler staged a review of the Kriegsmarine in the Bay of Kiel, accompanied by Hungarian admiral Miklós Horthy. It was the grandest display of the German Navy since the end of World War I. Before the review, the new heavy cruiser Prinz Eugen was launched.
- The Soviet Union warned the German Ambassador in Moscow that if Czechoslovakia were to be attacked, the Soviets would honour their 1935 treaty obligation to support that country.
- Born: Paul Maguire, American football player and sportscaster, in Youngstown, Ohio

== August 23, 1938 (Tuesday) ==
- Italy began a special census of all Jews in the country, sending lengthy questionnaires to all Jews and "suspected Jews". Even foreign tourists were required to participate.
- Died: Frank Hawks, 41, American aviator (plane crash)

== August 24, 1938 (Wednesday) ==
- The Kweilin Incident occurred when Japanese aircraft shot down a Douglas DC-2 airliner. It was the first time in history a civilian airliner was shot down.
- Hitler made a speech in Berlin honouring his guest Miklós Horthy that broadened the Rome-Berlin axis to include Hungary. Hitler spoke warmly of the many years of friendship between Germany and the Austro-Hungarian Empire.
- Born: David Freiberg, rock musician, in Cincinnati, Ohio

== August 25, 1938 (Thursday) ==
- Hitler and Horthy watched a massive military parade in Berlin. The attention of foreign military experts was drawn by the inclusion of an enormous new howitzer that they had never seen before.
- Died: Aleksandr I. Kuprin, 68, Russian writer and explorer

== August 26, 1938 (Friday) ==
- Germany sent notes to Britain and France asking them to compel Czechoslovakia to accept the demands of the Sudeten Germans, including giving them the right to autonomy.
- The British government announced the mobilization of the Royal Navy in response to German military exercises.
- A bomb explosion at a market in Jaffa killed at least 20 Arabs.
- Born: Susan Harrison, actress, in Leesburg, Florida (d. 2019)
- Died: Jamshid Nakhchivanski, 43, Russian military commander (executed)

== August 27, 1938 (Saturday) ==
- Winston Churchill made a speech in Theydon Bois saying that war was not inevitable, "But the danger to peace will not be removed until the vast German armies which have been called from their homes into the ranks have been dispersed. For a country which is itself not menaced by anyone, in no fear of anyone, to place over 150,000 soldiers upon a war footing is a very grave step." Churchill said that Europe's fate lay in the hands of "the extraordinary man at the summit of Germany. He has raised the country from defeat; he has brought it back again to the foremost ranks of power. It would indeed be a fatal act if he were to cast away all he has done for the German people by leading them into what would almost certainly become a world war."
- Monte Pearson of the New York Yankees pitched a 13-0 no-hitter against the Cleveland Indians.

== August 28, 1938 (Sunday) ==
- Lord Runciman held a hastily arranged meeting with Sudeten German leader Konrad Henlein to discuss the Sudeten crisis.
- Born: Maurizio Costanzo, television host and screenwriter, in Rome, Italy (d. 2023); Paul Martin, 21st Prime Minister of Canada, in Windsor, Ontario

== August 29, 1938 (Monday) ==
- Alexander P. de Seversky set a new east-to-west transcontinental flight record of 10 hours and 3 minutes.
- Born: Elliott Gould, actor, in Brooklyn, New York; Robert Rubin, lawyer and banking executive, in New York City
- Died: Béla Kun, Hungarian revolutionary (executed in the Soviet Union)

== August 30, 1938 (Tuesday) ==
- The British cabinet held a meeting on the Sudeten crisis and then issued a vague statement to the public: "At the conclusion of the meeting the ministers expressed their entire agreement with the action already taken and the policy to be pursued in the future." In private they agreed that Britain would not threaten war if Hitler went into Czechoslovakia.
- Died: Max Factor Sr., 65, Polish businessman; James Scott, 53, American ragtime composer

== August 31, 1938 (Wednesday) ==
- Winston Churchill wrote to the Foreign Secretary Lord Halifax urging the formation of a united front with France, the Soviet Union and the United States.
- Douglas Corrigan went to the White House and briefly met President Roosevelt. After the meeting Corrigan said the president had told him to "be careful and not take any more chances."
- Born: Martin Bell, journalist and politician, in Redisham, England
