= Clash at Habersbirk =

1938 armed confrontation in Czechoslovakia

- Part of Sudeten German uprising
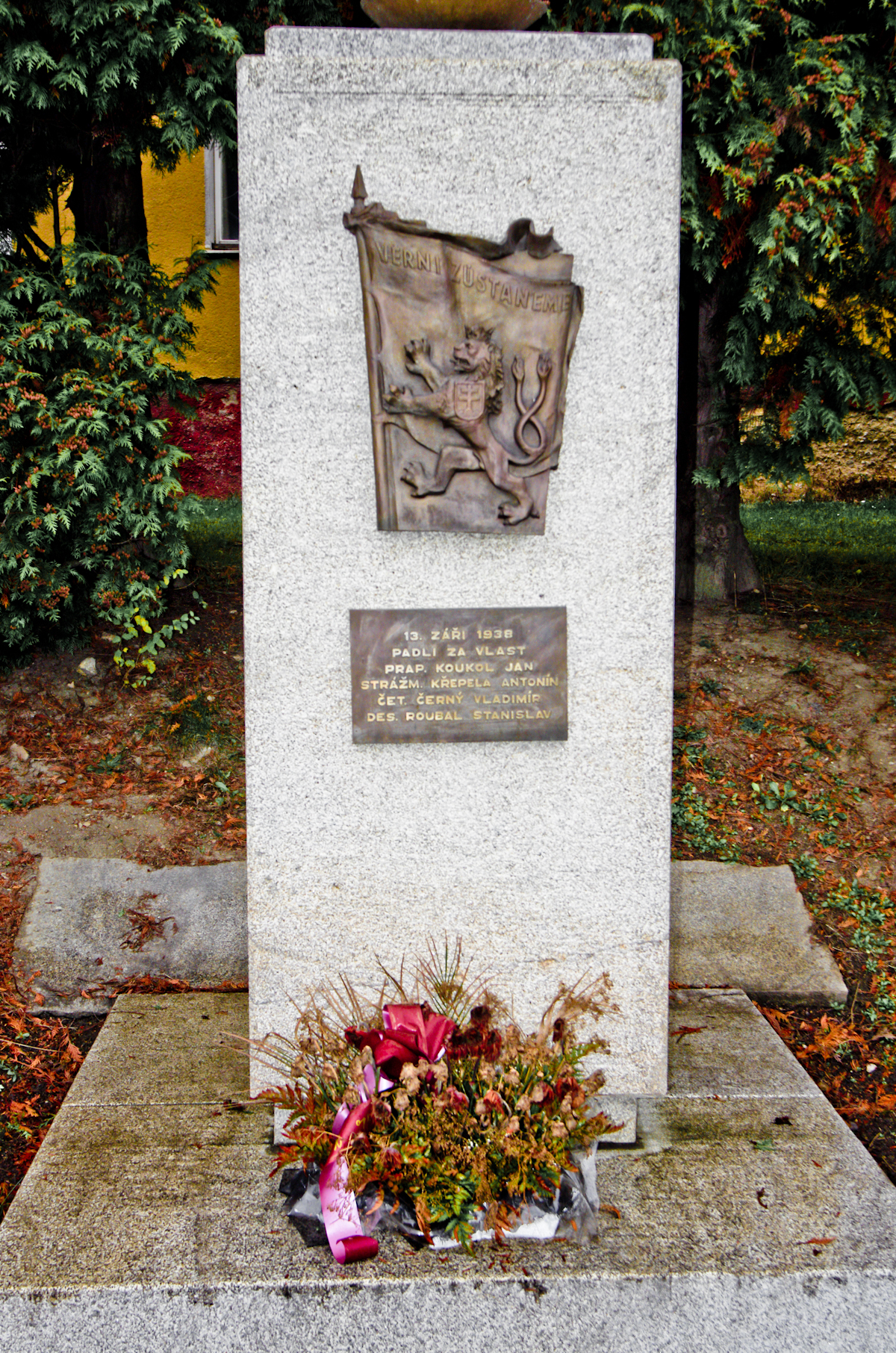
- Memorial to the fallen Czechoslovak gendarmes in Habartov
Date	13 September 1938
Location	Habartov, Czechoslovakia 50°11′00″N 12°33′01″E
Result	Czechoslovak victory

Belligerents
Czechoslovakia	SdP sympathisers Freikorps

Commanders and leaders
Jan Koukol †; Jan Pardus	Otto Plass †; Franz Schul; Johan Burkl

Strength
4 gendarmes (initially), later reinforced by 11 more	Dozens of irregulars

Casualties and losses
4 dead	4 dead
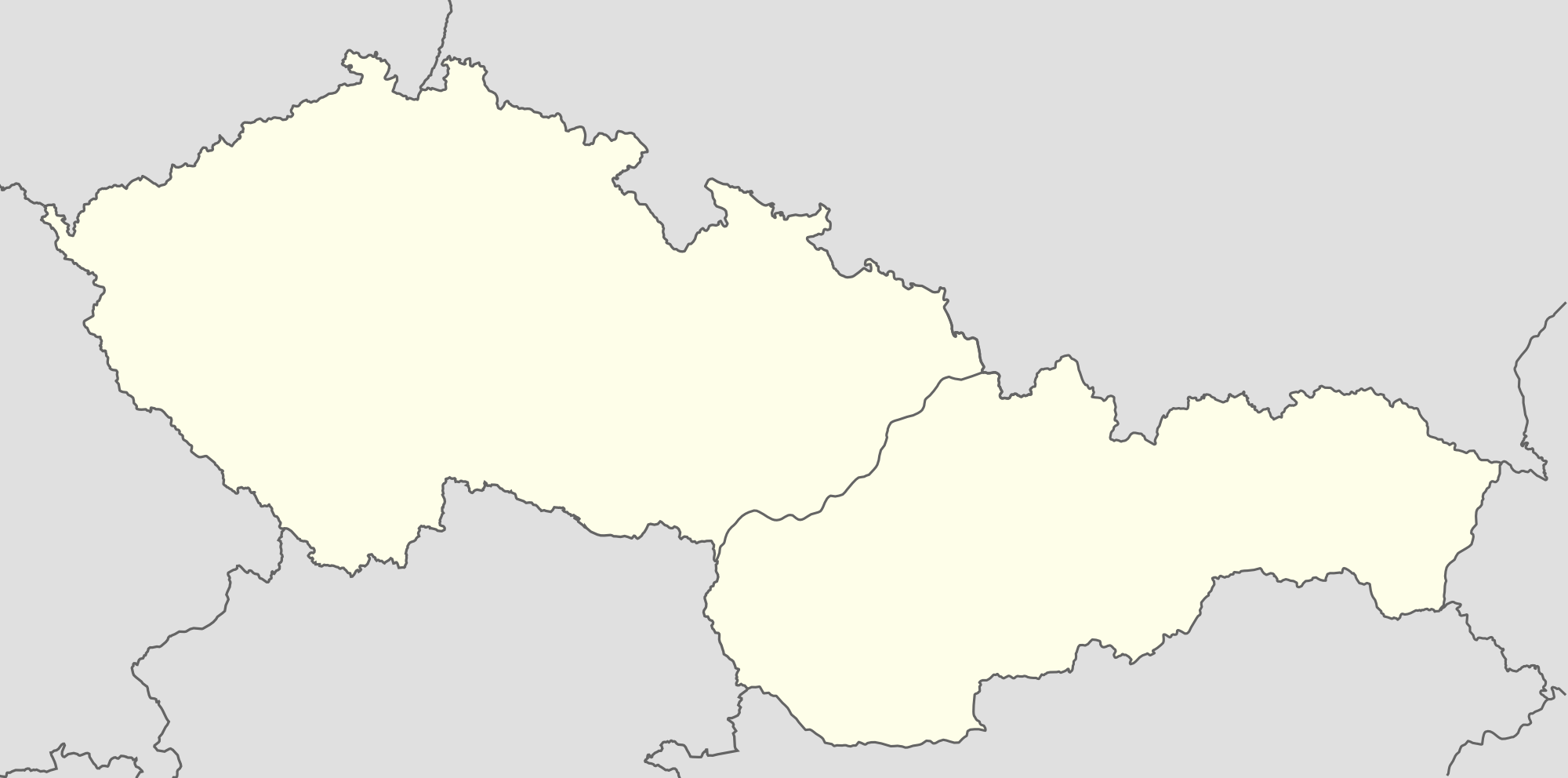
- Location within Czechoslovakia

The Clash at Habersbirk (Czech: Habartov) was the first armed confrontation between the Czechoslovak gendarmerie and the Sudeten Germans. It is sometimes marked as the first battle of the Second World War.

== Background ==
In 1938, Habersbirk was inhabited by 3,135 people, of whom 207 were Czech. The population was overwhelmingly Sudeten German. The local gendarmerie was composed of four Czech men: chief (praporčík) Jan Koukol and sergeants Jan Pardus, Antonín Křepela and Matěj Příbek. During the year, the gendarmerie station received a number of threatening anonymous messages, mainly targeted at Pardus. The ordners set out to guard crossroads in the area.

== The clash ==
The first incidents occurred in the morning of 13 September. Sergeant Pardus was intercepted by a crowd of Sudeten Germans on his way to purchase cigarettes, but only met with swear words. A swastika banner was hung from the church tower, which Pardus and Koukol set out to remove. The confrontation with the crowd got tenser at the church, but both gendarmes were left to return to the station, where the crowd partially dispersed.

Another part of the German crowd thrust into the building and dragged out Pardus' wife, Růžena Pardusová. They forced her back into her apartment and imprisoned her there, demanding the capitulation of the gendarmes. This resulted in a gunfight between the gendarmes and the Germans, who stormed the building but were driven out by the gendarmes. Jan Koukol and the leader of the insurgents, Otto Plass, were killed in the action, Sergeant Příbek was wounded.

The crowd brought Růžena Pardusová in front of the station. The gendarmes were given an ultimatum to stand down, lest she be shot. The gendarmes then started to exit the station unarmed, Příbek first, then Křepela and Pardus. Pardus was immediately shot at and lynched by the crowd, who pierced his ears with swastika-shaped holes.

Around 14:00, eleven more gendarmes arrived in the town in a bus and immediately confronted the Germans. Gendarmes Roubal and Černý were killed in the engagement. The Germans were forced to flee. Later, the dead body of Křepela was found with signs of torture.
