= September 1938 =

Month of 1938

| << | September 1938 | | | | | >> |
| Su | Mo | Tu | We | Th | Fr | Sa |
| | | | | 1 | 2 | 3 |
| 4 | 5 | 6 | 7 | 8 | 9 | 10 |
| 11 | 12 | 13 | 14 | 15 | 16 | 17 |
| 18 | 19 | 20 | 21 | 22 | 23 | 24 |
| 25 | 26 | 27 | 28 | 29 | 30 |

The following events occurred in September 1938:

== September 1, 1938 (Thursday) ==
- Benito Mussolini ordered all Jews who had entered Italy since January 1, 1919 to get out within six months. The order affected some 10,000 people.
- Sudeten German leader Konrad Henlein met with Hitler at the Berghof in Berchtesgaden.
- It was announced in Austria that all religious and other private schools would be closed and education would be taken over by the Nazi Party.
- The Frank Capra-directed romantic comedy film You Can't Take It with You starring Jean Arthur and Lionel Barrymore premiered at Radio City Music Hall in New York City.
- Born: Per Kirkeby, artist, in Copenhagen, Denmark (d. 2018)
- Died: Nikolai Bryukhanov, 59, Russian statesman (executed)

== September 2, 1938 (Friday) ==
- Elections were held in the Sanjak of Alexandretta. Turkish candidates won 22 of 40 seats, creating the conditions for the declaration of a new Turkish-aligned state.
- Italy ordered Jewish teachers, officials and students excluded from state schools. Some students who had already begun their studies were exempt from the new law under special circumstances.
- Born: Clarence Felder, actor, in St. Matthews, South Carolina; Giuliano Gemma, actor, in Rome, Italy (d. 2013)
- Died: Walter Schott, 76, German sculptor

== September 3, 1938 (Saturday) ==
- Hitler conferred with Walther von Brauchitsch and Wilhelm Keitel on Fall Grün. Hitler brushed aside Brauchitsch's objections that the Wehrmacht lacked preparedness and ordered the troops to be ready to march at two days' notice.
- The International Olympic Committee awarded the 1940 Winter Olympics to St. Moritz, Switzerland and the 1944 Summer Olympics to Helsinki, Finland.
- Born: Ryōji Noyori, chemist and Nobel laureate, in Kobe, Japan

== September 4, 1938 (Sunday) ==
- Edmonton air crash: A Royal Air Force plane crashed into a residential area in the Edmonton region of London, killing the pilot and twelve other people.

== September 5, 1938 (Monday) ==
- Seguro Obrero massacre: In Chile, armed militants from the National Socialist Movement launch a failed coup attempt against Arturo Alessandri.
- The annual Nuremberg Rally began in Germany. This would be the last Nazi Party Congress ever held.
- The Soviet drama film Professor Mamlock premiered in the USSR.

== September 6, 1938 (Tuesday) ==
- The Czechoslovak government offered a new plan providing all nationalities with proportional representation in state offices.
- Born: Dennis Oppenheim, artist, in Electric City, Washington (d. 2011)

== September 7, 1938 (Wednesday) ==
- Hatay State was created in the territory of the Sanjak of Alexandretta of the French Mandate of Syria.
- On instructions from Hitler, Konrad Henlein broke off negotiations with the Czech government. Allegations of Czech police brutality at Moravská Ostrava were used as an excuse.
- Theo Kordt informed foreign secretary Lord Halifax at 10 Downing Street on Oster conspiracy preparations for a Wehrmacht coup against Hitler to start upon his issuance of a declaration of war on Czechoslovakia.
- A famously controversial editorial appeared in The Times which recommended giving Hitler what he wanted because "the advantages to Czechoslovakia of becoming a homogenous State might conceivably outweigh the obvious disadvantages of losing the Sudeten German districts of the borderland."
- Died: William Henry Singleton, 95, American slave, soldier and Christian minister

== September 8, 1938 (Thursday) ==
- Representatives of Czechoslovakia's various minorities presented a united front against the government and agreed upon the "urgent necessity for reconstruction of the state and settlement of the minorities question."
- Born: Kenichi Horie, yachtsman, in Osaka, Japan; Poornachandra Tejaswi, writer, in Kuppalli, Karnataka, British India (d. 2007)

== September 9, 1938 (Friday) ==
- U.S. President Franklin D. Roosevelt gave a press conference in which he denied that a quote recently attributed to the Ambassador to France William Christian Bullitt, Jr. had ever been made. Bullitt allegedly said that France and the United States "were united in war as in peace".
- Lou Boudreau made his major league debut for the Cleveland Indians, going 0-for-1 against the Detroit Tigers.

== September 10, 1938 (Saturday) ==
- Hermann Göring made an inflammatory speech at the Nuremberg Rally, accusing the Czechoslovak government of "oppressing a cultured people". Czechoslovak President Edvard Beneš made a radio address making no mention of the diatribe and appealing for peace.
- Miss Ohio Marilyn Meseke was crowned Miss America 1938.
- The stage musical Hellzapoppin opened at the Shubert Theatre in Boston twelve days ahead of its Broadway premiere at the 46th Street Theatre.
- Born: David Hamilton, radio and television presenter, in Manchester, England
- Died: Alfonso, Prince of Asturias, 31 (car accident)

== September 11, 1938 (Sunday) ==
- Tazio Nuvolari of Italy won the Italian Grand Prix. It was the last Italian Grand Prix held until 1947.

== September 12, 1938 (Monday) ==
- Hitler made a bombastic speech in Nuremberg declaring that the oppression of Sudeten Germans must end. The speech was broadcast live to the United States by CBS Radio and was the first time that many Americans had ever heard Hitler speak.
- The British cabinet held a meeting almost as soon as Hitler was finished speaking. They were relieved that Hitler had only demanded "justice" for Sudeten Germans and had not committed himself to war.
- BBC Television showed a film for the first time, Man of the Moment.

== September 13, 1938 (Tuesday) ==
- Sudeten Germans began attacking police stations and other symbols of Czechoslovak authority, causing the government to declare martial law.
- French Prime Minister Édouard Daladier asked Neville Chamberlain to make the best deal he could with Hitler.
- Nara Prefecture Kashihara Archaeological Institute and Research, a well known place for archaeological research place in Japan, was founded by Masao Suenaga in Japan.
- Born: Angus Douglas-Hamilton, 15th Duke of Hamilton, in London, England (d. 2010); John Smith, leader of the British Labour Party, in Dalmally, Scotland (d. 1994)

== September 14, 1938 (Wednesday) ==
- The Czechoslovak government announced that the Sudeten revolt had been put down.
- The Graf Zeppelin II had its first flight.

== September 15, 1938 (Thursday) ==
- British Prime Minister Neville Chamberlain boarded a plane for the first time in his life and flew to Berchtesgaden to meet with Adolf Hitler. Chamberlain had already decided not to go to war over Czechoslovakia, so all that was left to negotiate was the means of meeting Hitler's demands.
- Brothers Lloyd and Paul Waner of the Pittsburgh Pirates hit back-to-back home runs off Cliff Melton of the New York Giants. They were the only brothers to ever hit back-to-back home runs in the majors until 2013 when B. J. and Justin Upton accomplished the same feat.
- Empresa Mexicana de Lucha Libre held the EMLL 5th Anniversary Show.
- Born: Gaylord Perry, American baseball player, in Williamston, North Carolina (d. 2022)
- Died: Thomas Wolfe, 37, American novelist (pneumonia)

== September 16, 1938 (Friday) ==
- A mayoral election has held in Los Angeles following the recall of incumbent Frank L. Shaw. Fletcher Bowron was elected the new mayor.
- Died: Valerie Bergere, 71, French-born American actress

== September 17, 1938 (Saturday) ==
- Neville Chamberlain reported to the Cabinet on his meeting with Hitler, informing its members of his belief that a settlement of the Sudeten matter would satisfy Hitler's aims.
- Born: LeeRoy Yarbrough, racing driver, in Jacksonville, Florida (d. 1984)
- Died: Bruno Jasieński, 37, Polish poet (executed in the Soviet Union)

== September 18, 1938 (Sunday) ==
- French Prime Minister Édouard Daladier and his foreign minister Georges Bonnet came to London for a conference on Czechoslovakia. The German annexation of the Sudetenland was agreed upon.
- The New York Yankees clinched the American League pennant in an unusual fashion: the second-place Boston Red Sox were mathematically eliminated by having their doubleheader against the Chicago White Sox canceled.
- Born: Billy Robinson, professional wrestler, in Manchester, England (d. 2014)
- Died: Horace Trumbauer, 69, American architect

== September 19, 1938 (Monday) ==
- The British and French representatives in Prague presented the Anglo-French proposal to allow the Sudetenland to be annexed.
- Died: Pauline Frederick, 55, American actress (asthma attack)

== September 20, 1938 (Tuesday) ==
- The Czechoslovak government rejected the Anglo-French proposal in a note explaining that acceptance would mean that Czechoslovakia would be put "sooner or later under the complete domination of Germany."
- Hitler met with the Polish ambassador Józef Lipski and told him that Germany would support Poland in a conflict with Czechoslovakia over Teschen. Hitler also said he was considering shipping Europe's Jews to a colony and expressed hope that Poland would cooperate with such a plan. Lipski replied that if Hitler could solve the Jewish question, the Poles would build a beautiful monument to him in Warsaw.

== September 21, 1938 (Wednesday) ==
- The British and French ambassadors informed Czechoslovak President Edvard Beneš that his country would have to accept their plan or face Germany alone.
- The New England hurricane killed 650 people along the coast of the northeastern United States.
- The comedy film Room Service starring the Marx Brothers premiered in New York.
- The stage musical You Never Know with music by Cole Porter and Robert Katscher opened at the Winter Garden Theatre on Broadway.

== September 22, 1938 (Thursday) ==
- The Czechoslovak government resigned. Jan Syrový became the new Prime Minister.
- Neville Chamberlain returned to Germany and met with Hitler again for two days at Bad Godesberg. Hitler was much more bellicose than before and demanded to occupy the Sudetenland by October 1 with all of the region's military equipment left intact.
- Born: Gene Mingo, American football player, in Akron, Ohio

== September 23, 1938 (Friday) ==
- The new Czechoslovak government ordered full mobilization of its military.
- Born: Tom Lester, actor and evangelist, in Laurel, Mississippi (d. 2020); Romy Schneider, actress, in Vienna, Austria (d. 1982)

== September 24, 1938 (Saturday) ==
- France ordered partial mobilization of its military.
- Carlton defeated Collingwood in the VFL Grand Final.

== September 25, 1938 (Sunday) ==
- Czechoslovakia rejected Hitler's latest demands from Godesburg as "an ultimatum given to a defeated nation, not a sovereign one."
- British Royal Navy ordered to sea.
- Born: Jonathan Motzfeldt, 1st Prime Minister of Greenland, in Qassimiut (d. 2010)
- Died: Paul Olaf Bodding, 72, Norwegian missionary, linguist and folklorist

== September 26, 1938 (Monday) ==
- In the Berlin Sportpalast, Hitler made a speech threatening Czechoslovakia with war. "My patience is exhausted", Hitler declared. "If Beneš does not want peace we will have to take matters into our own hands."
- 68 were killed in a train crash in Barcelona.
- Born: Jonathan Goldsmith, American actor, in New York City

== September 27, 1938 (Tuesday) ==
- The French government announced that France would not enter a war purely over Czechoslovakia. Neville Chamberlain gave a radio address saying, "However much we may sympathize with a small nation confronted by a big and powerful neighbor, we cannot in all circumstances undertake to involve the whole British Empire in a war simply on her account. If we have to fight it must be on larger issues than that."
- The League of Nations identified Japan as the aggressor in the Second Sino-Japanese War and invited its members to support China.

== September 28, 1938 (Wednesday) ==
- Hitler agreed to hold a four-party conference in Munich between Germany, Great Britain, France and Italy.
- Gabby Hartnett of the Chicago Cubs hit the Homer in the Gloamin'.
- Born: Ben E. King, soul and R&B singer, in Henderson, North Carolina (d. 2015)
- Died: Con Conrad, 47, American songwriter

== September 29, 1938 (Thursday) ==
- German Führer Adolf Hitler, British Prime Minister Neville Chamberlain, French Prime Minister Édouard Daladier and Italian Duce Benito Mussolini met in Munich to settle the Sudetenland crisis. Czechoslovakia was not invited, neither was the Soviet Union.
- Poland submitted an ultimatum to Czechoslovakia demanding the annexation of Teschen.
- Born: Wim Kok, Prime Minister of the Netherlands, in Bergambacht (d. 2018)

== September 30, 1938 (Friday) ==
- Munich Agreement: At 1 a.m., the four powers at Munich agreed that Czechoslovakia would cede the Sudetenland to Germany by October 10. The territorial integrity of the rest of Czechoslovakia was guaranteed by all signatories.
- Neville Chamberlain flew back to Britain and declared "peace for our time".
