= October 1938 =

Month of 1938

<<	October 1938					>>
Su	Mo	Tu	We	Th	Fr	Sa
						1
2	3	4	5	6	7	8
9	10	11	12	13	14	15
16	17	18	19	20	21	22
23	24	25	26	27	28	29
30	31

The following events occurred in October 1938:

== October 1, 1938 (Saturday) ==
- German troops began to occupy the Sudetenland.
- The Battle of Wanjialing began.
- The Chicago Cubs won the National League pennant with a 10–3 victory over the St. Louis Cardinals in the second game of a doubleheader.
- Born: Stella Stevens, actress, in Yazoo City, Mississippi (d. 2023)

== October 2, 1938 (Sunday) ==
- Poland occupied Teschen.
- Tiberias massacre: Arabs killed 19 Jews in Tiberias, mostly by stabbing.
- Died: Alexandru Averescu, 79, Romanian general and politician

== October 3, 1938 (Monday) ==
- Nazi Germany issued the Decree on the Confiscation of Jewish Property, regulating the transfer of assets from Jews to non-Jews in the country.
- Duff Cooper made a speech to the House of Commons explaining his reason for resigning as First Lord of the Admiralty. Cooper opposed Neville Chamberlain's appeasement policy and said that Britain should have fought "in order that one great Power should not be allowed, in disregard of treaty obligations, of the laws of nations and the decrees of morality to dominate by brutal force the Continent of Europe. For that principle we fought against Napoleon Buonaparte, and against Louis XIV of France and Philip II of Spain. For that principle we must ever be prepared to fight, for on the day when we are not prepared to fight for it we forfeit our Empire, our liberties and our independence."
- Irish troops took over the forts of Dunree and Leenan on Lough Swilly, ending 247 years of British military presence in Ireland.
- Born: Eddie Cochran, rockabilly musician, in Albert Lea, Minnesota (d. 1960)

== October 4, 1938 (Tuesday) ==
- Hitler rode into Karlsbad and gave a victory speech.
- All foreign troops fighting for the Spanish Republic were withdrawn from the lines.
- Born: Kurt Wüthrich, chemist and Nobel laureate, in Aarberg, Switzerland
- Died: Choʻlpon, 44 or 45, Uzbekistani poet (killed in the Great Purge)

== October 5, 1938 (Wednesday) ==
- Winston Churchill made a famous speech to the House of Commons calling the Munich Agreement "a total and unmitigated defeat."
- All German passports held by Jews were invalidated. Jews were required to surrender their old passports to have them revalidated by having a letter "J" stamped on them.
- In the British periodical The Week, Claud Cockburn wrote that Charles Lindbergh had recently told a meeting of the Cliveden set that the Luftwaffe could defeat the British, French, Soviet and Czechoslovak air forces combined.
- Texaco Star Theater was first broadcast on American radio.
- Died: Faustina Kowalska, 33, Polish nun

== October 6, 1938 (Thursday) ==
- The executive committee of the Slovak People's Party unilaterally declared Slovak autonomy within Czechoslovakia.
- The British film Pygmalion based on the George Bernard Shaw play of the same title premiered in the UK.

== October 7, 1938 (Friday) ==
- The Fascist Grand Council of Italy approved the first Italian Racial Laws, banning interracial marriage and prohibiting Jews from enrolling in the Fascist Party or serving in the military.
- The Alfred Hitchcock-directed comic thriller film The Lady Vanishes premiered in London.
- Born: Fereydoun Farrokhzad, Persian Poet, Entertainer and political activist, in Tehran (d. 1992)

== October 8, 1938 (Saturday) ==
- In Vienna, a violent mob stormed the palace of Cardinal Theodor Innitzer and ransacked it. Nazis had been angered by a recent sermon Innitzer gave protesting the government's interference with the Catholic church.
- The Italian Chamber of Deputies was abolished and replaced by the Chamber of Fasces and Corporations.

== October 9, 1938 (Sunday) ==
- Members of the Hitler Youth gathered outside St. Stephen's Cathedral in Vienna and beat drums to disturb the evening services going on inside. They also sang war songs and shouted, "Where does Innitzer belong? Dachau!"
- The New York Yankees won their third consecutive World Series with an 8–3 win over the Chicago Cubs to complete a four-game sweep.
- Born: Heinz Fischer, President of Austria, in Graz

== October 10, 1938 (Monday) ==
- The Soviet newspaper Pravda picked up on Claud Cockburn's recent article about Charles Lindbergh and published an article of its own, in which leading Russian airmen accused Lindbergh of spreading lies about Soviet air strength to encourage Neville Chamberlain to concede part of Czechoslovakia. Lady Astor, who gave the dinner party where the remarks were allegedly made, called the accusations a "complete lie" and said that Lindbergh did talk about Russia but did not say anything about its air force. "You can safely attribute these reports to communist propaganda coming from Claud Cockburn, who started the completely unfounded rumors about the Cliveden set", she said.
- The Blue Water Bridge opened, connecting Port Huron, Michigan with Point Edward, Ontario, Canada.
- Died: Martin Hawke, 7th Baron Hawke, 78, English cricketer

== October 11, 1938 (Tuesday) ==
- The Battle of Wanjialing ended in a Chinese victory.
- Four bombs were thrown at the automobile of Jerusalem governor Edward Keith-Roach. The bombs exploded in the street and no one was injured.
- Czechoslovakia granted autonomy to Ruthenia which took the name Carpathian Ukraine.
- Charles Lindbergh and wife Anne began their third visit to Nazi Germany.

== October 12, 1938 (Wednesday) ==
- Japanese troops landed near Hong Kong as a part of the Canton Operation.
- Died: Kirill Vladimirovich, Grand Duke of Russia, 62

== October 13, 1938 (Thursday) ==
- Hungary asked the four signatories of the Munich Agreement to settle Hungarian territorial demands against Czechoslovakia.
- Orders were posted throughout Teschen for all Czechs who had settled there since November 1918 to leave by November 1.
- The film The Wizard of Oz began production.
- Born: Christiane Hörbiger, actress, in Vienna, Austria (d. 2022)
- Died: E. C. Segar, 43, American cartoonist and creator of Popeye

== October 14, 1938 (Friday) ==
- Hungary ordered mobilization of its army in response to Czechoslovakia's failure to satisfy Hungarian territorial claims.
- The Seafarers International Union of North America was founded.
- Born: John Dean, U.S. presidential advisor, in Akron, Ohio; Ron Lancaster, CFL quarterback, in Fairchance, Pennsylvania (d. 2008); Farah Pahlavi, Queen of Iran, in Tehran

== October 15, 1938 (Saturday) ==
- A general election was held in New Zealand. The governing Labour Party was re-elected.
- Nazi Germany banned Jews from practicing law after November 30.
- Born: Fela Kuti, musician and activist, in Abeokuta, Nigeria (d. 1997)

== October 16, 1938 (Sunday) ==
- Winston Churchill gave a radio address to the United States outlining the threat of Nazi Germany and the need of both Britain and the United States to arm themselves. The speech was titled "The Defence of Freedom and Peace" but subtitled "The Lights are Going Out", an allusion to the famous comment attributed to Sir Edward Grey at the beginning of the First World War, "The lamps are going out all over Europe".
- Four Germans were arrested as spies at the Panama Canal when they were caught taking photographs of Fort Randolph.
- Gottfried von Cramm was released early from prison.
- Born: Carl Gunter, Jr., politician, in Alexandria, Louisiana (d. 1999); Nico, singer, in Cologne, Germany (d. 1988)

== October 17, 1938 (Monday) ==
- The Soviet Union created the Medal for Battle Merit and the Medal for Courage.
- Born: Evel Knievel, daredevil, in Butte, Montana (d. 2007)
- Died: Karl Kautsky, 84, Czech-Austrian philosopher and journalist

== October 18, 1938 (Tuesday) ==
- Germany began to demobilize with the Sudetenland crisis having passed.
- Born: Dawn Wells, actress, in Reno, Nevada (d. 2020)

== October 19, 1938 (Wednesday) ==
- Hermann Göring presented Charles Lindbergh with the Service Cross of the Order of the German Eagle. Lindbergh's acceptance of the award became very controversial in the United States, though Lindbergh claimed the award had been sprung on him without warning.
- The British cabinet abandoned the Peel Commission Palestinian partition plan.
- Died: Prince Fushimi Hiroyoshi, 40, Japanese naval officer (myocardial infarction)

== October 20, 1938 (Thursday) ==
- The Czechoslovak government outlawed the Communist Party in the provinces of Bohemia, Moravia and Silesia.
- At least 226 people were killed by a typhoon that struck Kyushu, Japan.
- Born: Kathy Kirby, singer, in Ilford, England (d. 2011); Iain Macmillan, photographer, in Dundee, Scotland (d. 2007)
- Died: Walter Russell Crampton, 61, Australian trade unionist, journalist and politician

== October 21, 1938 (Friday) ==
- The Japanese captured Canton.
- The Czechoslovak government terminated its mutual assistance pact with the Soviet Union under pressure from Germany.
- Hitler delivered instructions to OKH to prepare plans for the invasion of the rest of Czechoslovakia and Memelland.

== October 22, 1938 (Saturday) ==
- Chester Carlson produced the first xerographic image in Queens, New York.
- Buddy Ebsen became ill on the set of The Wizard of Oz and was hospitalized after the aluminum dust makeup from his Tin Man costume rendered him barely able to breathe. Ebsen would be replaced by Jack Haley.
- Born: Christopher Lloyd, actor, in Stamford, Connecticut
- Died: May Irwin, 76, Canadian actress and vaudeville performer

== October 23, 1938 (Sunday) ==
- All Roman Catholic churches in Vienna read a letter by Cardinal Theodor Innitzer denying that he had attacked Adolf Hitler in a sermon. The letter concluded: "I declare now, as before, that I hold the opinion a Catholic must conscientiously fulfill his duty toward the state, but the bishop must also at all times carry out his sworn duty at representing the reich of God and church."
- Born: H. John Heinz III, politician, in Pittsburgh, Pennsylvania (d. 1991)
- Died: Fred Barnes, 53, English music hall singer

== October 24, 1938 (Monday) ==
- Hitler sent his foreign minister Joachim von Ribbentrop to meet with Polish ambassador Józef Lipski at Berchtesgaden. Ribbentrop declared it was time for Danzig to revert to Germany, but Lipski replied that the Polish government was unlikely to agree.
- Died: Ernst Barlach, 68, German sculptor, printmaker and writer

== October 25, 1938 (Tuesday) ==
- Hankou fell to the Japanese.
- A presidential election was held in Chile. Pedro Aguirre Cerda of the Radical Party was elected by a narrow margin.
- An Australian National Airways Douglas DC-2 crashed into Mount Dandenong, killing all 18 aboard.

== October 26, 1938 (Wednesday) ==
- Czechoslovakia accepted a Hungarian proposal to have Germany and Italy arbitrate their territorial dispute.
- A hockey game was televised for the very first time, on BBC Television between the Harringay Racers and Harringay Greyhounds at Harringay Arena in North London, England.

== October 27, 1938 (Thursday) ==
- The Battle of Wuhan ended in a Pyhrric Japanese victory.
- The Nazis began arresting Jews with Polish citizenship with the intention of deporting them back to Poland.
- Quinton Hogg won the Oxford by-election following a hard-fought campaign that focused almost exclusively on foreign affairs. Hogg was a supporter of Chamberlain's appeasement policy and the by-election result was seen as an endorsement of the Munich Agreement by the British public.
- James Stanhope was named First Lord of the Admiralty.
- Died: Lascelles Abercrombie, 57, British poet and literary critic; Alma Gluck, 54, Romanian-born American soprano

== October 28, 1938 (Friday) ==
- Some 12,000 Polish Jews were deported from Germany in the vicinity of the border town of Zbąszyń. Many of the expelled Jews were denied entry into Poland on the basis of the country's new denaturalization law. Some went back into Germany and about 5,500 wound up staying in disused stables and other temporary shelters around Zbąszyń with nowhere else to go.
- Five acres of the shopping and hotel district of Marseille burned to the ground. Almost 100 perished in the blaze.
- Barcelona held a farewell parade for the International Brigades.
- Born: Anne Perry, author, in Blackheath, London, England (d. 2023)
- Died: Fred Kohler, 50, American actor (heart attack)

== October 29, 1938 (Saturday) ==
- All opposition parties were banned in Romania.
- The comedy film Brother Rat starring Ronald Reagan, Priscilla Lane, Jane Wyman and Wayne Morris was released.
- Born: Ralph Bakshi, film director, in Haifa, Mandatory Palestine; Ellen Johnson Sirleaf, President of Liberia, in Monrovia

== October 30, 1938 (Sunday) ==
- A radio drama performance of The War of the Worlds directed and narrated by Orson Welles aired over the CBS radio network. It became famous for allegedly causing a nationwide panic among people who thought the drama about an alien invasion by Martians was a real news broadcast, but such accounts have been wildly exaggerated.

== October 31, 1938 (Monday) ==
- Neville Chamberlain appointed Sir John Anderson as Lord Privy Seal and put him in charge of air-raid defence preparations.
- Died: Jean Degoutte, 72, French general; Robert Woolsey, 50, American comedian and one-half of the Wheeler & Woolsey comedy team (kidney failure)
