= November 1938 =

Month of 1938

<<	November 1938					>>
Su	Mo	Tu	We	Th	Fr	Sa
		1	2	3	4	5
6	7	8	9	10	11	12
13	14	15	16	17	18	19
20	21	22	23	24	25	26
27	28	29	30

The following events occurred in November 1938:

== November 1, 1938 (Tuesday) ==
- Seabiscuit defeated War Admiral in a special race at Pimlico Race Course in front of a crowd of 40,000.
- Died: Charles Weeghman, 64, American restaurateur and owner of the Chicago Cubs baseball team

== November 2, 1938 (Wednesday) ==
- Vienna Award: An Italo-German arbitration commission gave Hungary a large piece of Czechoslovak territory consisting of 5,000 square miles of land and a million people.
- The Spanish cargo ship SS Cantabria was sunk by a Nationalist cruiser.
- Born: Pat Buchanan, politician and commentator, in Washington, D.C.; David Lane, white supremacist, in Woden, Iowa (d. 2007); Queen Sophia of Spain, in Psychiko, Athens, Greece; Richard Serra, minimalist sculptor, in San Francisco (d. 2024)

== November 3, 1938 (Thursday) ==
- Japanese Prime Minister Fumimaro Konoe addressed the nation, announcing a "New Order in East Asia" based, he said, on cooperation between Japan, China and Manchukuo.
- The bronze statue of Artemas Ward by Leonard Crunelle was dedicated at Ward Circle in Washington, D.C.
- Born: Yvon Cormier, professional wrestler, in Dorchester, New Brunswick, Canada (d. 2009)

== November 4, 1938 (Friday) ==
- A Jersey Airways de Havilland DH-86 crashed two minutes after takeoff in Jersey (Channel Islands), killing all 14 aboard and 1 farm worker on the ground.
- The 1938 deportation of Jews from Slovakia by the Hlinka Guard and police began.
- Died: Samuel W. Bryant, 61, American admiral

== November 5, 1938 (Saturday) ==
- Hungarian troops crossed the Danube to claim the territory they received in the Vienna Award.
- Born: Enéas Carneiro, politician, in Rio Branco, Acre, Brazil (d. 2007); Joe Dassin, American-born French singer-songwriter, in Brooklyn, New York (d. 1980)

== November 6, 1938 (Sunday) ==
- The Western comic strip Red Ryder first appeared.
- Born: Mack Jones, baseball player, in Atlanta (d. 2004); Branko Mikasinovich, scholar, in Belišće, Yugoslavia; Michael Schultz, film and television director, in Milwaukee, Wisconsin

== November 7, 1938 (Monday) ==
- Republican warplanes carried out the Bombing of Cabra.
- Herschel Grynszpan, whose Jewish parents were among those deported from Germany to Poland, shot the diplomat Ernst vom Rath at the German embassy in Paris.
- Born: Jim Kaat, baseball player, in Zeeland, Michigan

== November 8, 1938 (Tuesday) ==
- Midterm elections were held in the United States. The incumbent Democratic Party lost 72 seats in the House and 7 in the Senate.
- Born: Satch Sanders, basketball player and coach, in New York City

== November 9, 1938 (Wednesday) ==
- Kristallnacht: A wave of violence targeting Jews occurred throughout Germany and Austria in retaliation for the assassination of Ernst vom Rath. Nazi authorities did not interfere as Jewish shops and synagogues were burned and looted, but 20,000 Jews were arrested. The vast amounts of broken glass littering the streets outside the Jewish shops gave the night its name.
- Swiss citizen Maurice Bavaud attended a parade in Munich celebrating the 15th anniversary of the Beer Hall Putsch with the intention of assassinating Adolf Hitler with a pistol. However, Hitler marched on the far side of the street relative to Bavaud's position making the shot too difficult, so he abandoned his attempt.
- The Cole Porter stage musical Leave It to Me! opened at the Imperial Theatre on Broadway.
- Died: Vasily Blyukher, 48, Soviet military commander (killed in the Great Purge); Ernst vom Rath, 29, German diplomat (shot)

== November 10, 1938 (Thursday) ==
- The Siege of Gandesa was broken with the retreat of the Republicans.
- Died: Mustafa Kemal Atatürk, 57, 1st President of Turkey

== November 11, 1938 (Friday) ==
- İsmet İnönü became 2nd president of Turkey.
- German Interior Minister Wilhelm Frick passed a decree prohibiting Jews from possessing weapons.
- In Paris, the Duke and Duchess of Windsor met with the Duke and Duchess of Gloucester. It was the first time the brothers had met since Edward's abdication.
- Died: Typhoid Mary, 69, American carrier of typhoid fever

== November 12, 1938 (Saturday) ==
- The Decree on the Exclusion of Jews from German Economic Life closed all Jewish-owned businesses in Germany.
- All of Germany's Jews were ordered to pay a collective fine of 1 billion Reichsmarks for the murder of Ernst vom Rath. Each Jew in possession of property over 50,000 RM was required to pay 20 percent of its value.
- "My Reverie" by Larry Clinton topped the American popular music charts.
- Born: Benjamin Mkapa, 3rd president of Tanzania, in Ndanda, Tanganyika (d. 2020)
- Born: Alberto Diaz Lobo, Founder of ETERNA S.A. in San Pedro Sula, Honduras

== November 13, 1938 (Sunday) ==
- The Changsha fire began in Changsha, China. The fire was deliberately set by Chinese soldiers to keep the city's wealth from the Japanese.
- Maurice Bavaud was caught stowing away on a train in Augsburg. Later when interrogated by the Gestapo he admitted his plan to assassinate Hitler.
- Born: Jean Seberg, actress, in Marshalltown, Iowa (d. 1979)

== November 14, 1938 (Monday) ==
- The Lions Gate Bridge opened in Vancouver, British Columbia, Canada.
- The U.S. Supreme Court decided Kellogg Co. v. National Biscuit Co.

== November 15, 1938 (Tuesday) ==
- All Jewish children were banned from German public schools.
- U.S. President Franklin D. Roosevelt read a statement to the media strongly condemning the persecution of Jews in Germany and announcing that he had recalled the American ambassador to Germany.
- Italy ordered the removal of all books by Jewish authors from schools.
- Died: André Blondel, 75, French engineer and physicist; Harry Grant Dart, 69, US cartoonist

== November 16, 1938 (Wednesday) ==
- The Battle of the Ebro ended in a decisive Nationalist victory.
- The Congress of Industrial Organizations granted United Electrical, Radio and Machine Workers of America the first charter.
- The Halifax Slasher scare began in West Yorkshire, England when two young women reported being attacked by an unseen assailant with a mallet or hatchet.
- Lysergic acid diethylamide (LSD) was first synthesized by chemist Albert Hofmann.
- Born: Robert Nozick, philosopher, in Brooklyn, New York (d. 2002)

== November 17, 1938 (Thursday) ==
- The Italian Racial Laws passed on October 7 were adopted and became known as the November Laws.
- 11 people were trampled to death in Istanbul when the crowd pushed forward at Mustafa Kemal Atatürk's lying in state, fearing the doors would close before they could see his flag-draped coffin.
- Ernst vom Rath was given a state funeral in Düsseldorf attended by Hitler.
- Born: Charles Guthrie, Baron Guthrie of Craigiebank, British Army general, in the United Kingdom (d. 2025); Gordon Lightfoot, folk singer-songwriter, in Orillia, Ontario, Canada (d. 2023)

== November 18, 1938 (Friday) ==
- 3,500 members of the motion picture industry attended a "Quarantine Hitler" rally at the Philharmonic Auditorium in Los Angeles. John Garfield, Frank Capra, Joan Crawford and Thomas Mann were among the participants. The crowd unanimously voted to send a telegram to President Roosevelt urging him to use his authority to "express further the horror and the indignation of the American people" at the Nazi persecutions of Jews and Catholics.

== November 19, 1938 (Saturday) ==
- The Egyptian government initiated a major armaments program.
- Born: Ted Turner, media mogul and philanthropist, in Cincinnati, Ohio (d. 2026)

== November 20, 1938 (Sunday) ==
- Japanese authorities notified foreign powers that the Han River in China was closed to navigation without "special permission".
- Died: Maud of Wales, 68, Queen of Norway

== November 21, 1938 (Monday) ==
- Neville Chamberlain told the House of Commons of plans to lease at least 10,000 square miles in British Guiana to provide homes for German Jewish refugees.
- The U.S. Supreme Court decided General Talking Pictures Corp. v. Western Electric Co.

== November 22, 1938 (Tuesday) ==
- Hungary ordered the expulsion of Czechoslovaks from the territory occupied after the Vienna Award.

== November 23, 1938 (Wednesday) ==
- The Czechoslovak National Assembly approved full autonomy for Slovakia.
- The Rodgers and Hart stage musical The Boys from Syracuse opened at the Alvin Theatre on Broadway.

== November 24, 1938 (Thursday) ==
- A Thanksgiving snow storm began along the eastern seaboard of the United States that killed 44 people overnight.
- Hitler ordered his military to prepare for an occupation of Danzig.
- The Clifford Odets play Rocket to the Moon premiered at the Belasco Theatre in New York City.
- Born: Oscar Robertson, basketball player, in Charlotte, Tennessee; Charles Starkweather, murderer, in Lincoln, Nebraska (d. 1959)
- Died: Prince Johann Georg of Saxony, 69

== November 25, 1938 (Friday) ==
- The General Confederation of Labour in France called for a 24-hour general strike on November 30 to protest Prime Minister Édouard Daladier's decrees aimed at improving the economy at the expense of labour power.
- Died: Otto von Lossow, 70, German Army officer

== November 26, 1938 (Saturday) ==
- Édouard Daladier decreed the military requisition of all principal railways in a bid to crush the French general strike before it even began.
- Poland and the Soviet Union renewed their non-aggression pact of July 1932.
- Army defeated Navy 14–7 in the Army–Navy Game in Philadelphia.
- The gangster film Angels with Dirty Faces starring James Cagney and Pat O'Brien was released.
- Born: Porter Goss, politician, in Waterbury, Connecticut

== November 27, 1938 (Sunday) ==
- Édouard Daladier gave a radio address to the French people saying he would use all means necessary to break up the scheduled general strike and claiming that the labour agitation was a plot to set up a leftist dictatorship.
- Chicago White Sox pitcher Monty Stratton accidentally shot himself in the leg while hunting rabbits on his mother's farm near Greenville, Texas. He never played in the majors again.
- Frank Sinatra was arrested by the Bergen County Sheriff's Office. Sinatra was arrested for having an affair with a married woman, a criminal offense at the time.

== November 28, 1938 (Monday) ==
- A police decree in Nazi Germany authorized presidents of administrative districts to order restrictions on freedom of movement for Jews.
- Davey O'Brien of Texas Christian University won the Heisman Trophy.
- Born: Ernie Ladd, AFL defensive tackle and professional wrestler, in Rayville, Louisiana (d. 2007).

== November 29, 1938 (Tuesday) ==
- One of the Halifax Slasher's "victims", Percy Waddington, confessed to faking the attack on himself.
- The Reichsmusikkammer ordered that the Badenweiler Marsch only be performed in the presence of the Führer.
- Nazi Germany forbade Jews from keeping carrier pigeons.
- Died: Branislaw Tarashkyevich, 46, Belarusian politician and linguist (killed in the Great Purge)

== November 30, 1938 (Wednesday) ==
- The French general strike fizzled with only a few workers participating, but many labour leaders were arrested.
- Members of the Italian Chamber of Fasces and Corporations demanded that France turn over Corsica and Tunisia to Italy.
- Emil Hácha became 3rd President of Czechoslovakia.
- Nazi leaders were instructed to have flowers held by onlookers confiscated by security wherever Hitler's motorcade was about to pass through. The Nazis had been trying unsuccessfully for years to discourage the practice of throwing flowers at Hitler because it was feared that an assassin could throw a bouquet containing a bomb.
- Henry Ford issued a statement urging that Germany's persecuted Jews be allowed to come to the United States. "I believe that the United States cannot fail at this time to maintain its traditional role as a haven for the oppressed", Ford's statement read. "I am convinced not only that this country could absorb many of the victims of oppression who must find a refuge outside of their native lands, but that as many of them as could be admitted under our selective quota would constitute a real asset to our country."
- Died: Corneliu Zelea Codreanu, 39, Romanian far right politician
