= Imperial-Royal Gendarmerie =

Austrian (Austro-Hungarian) state police unit

Imperial-Royal Gendarmerie k.k. Gendarmerie

Agency overview
- Formed: 8 June 1849
- Dissolved: November 1918
- Superseding agency: Federal Gendarmerie (Bundesgendarmerie)

Jurisdictional structure
- Federal agency: Austrian Empire, Austria-Hungary
- Operations jurisdiction: Austrian Empire, Austria-Hungary
- General nature: Federal law enforcement; Gendarmerie; Civilian police

The Imperial and Royal Gendarmerie (German: kaiserlich-königliche (k.k.) Gendarmerie from French: gens d'armes: "armed people") was the primary law enforcement unit serving between 1849 and 1867 in Austrian Empire and between 1867 and 1881 also in transformed Austria-Hungary, sharing its role with the Hungarian Royal Gendarmerie until 1918. Established and organised as a military corps, the k.k. Gendarmerie was responsible for inspecting crime, maintaining public order and other police duties.

== History ==
=== Austrian Empire ===
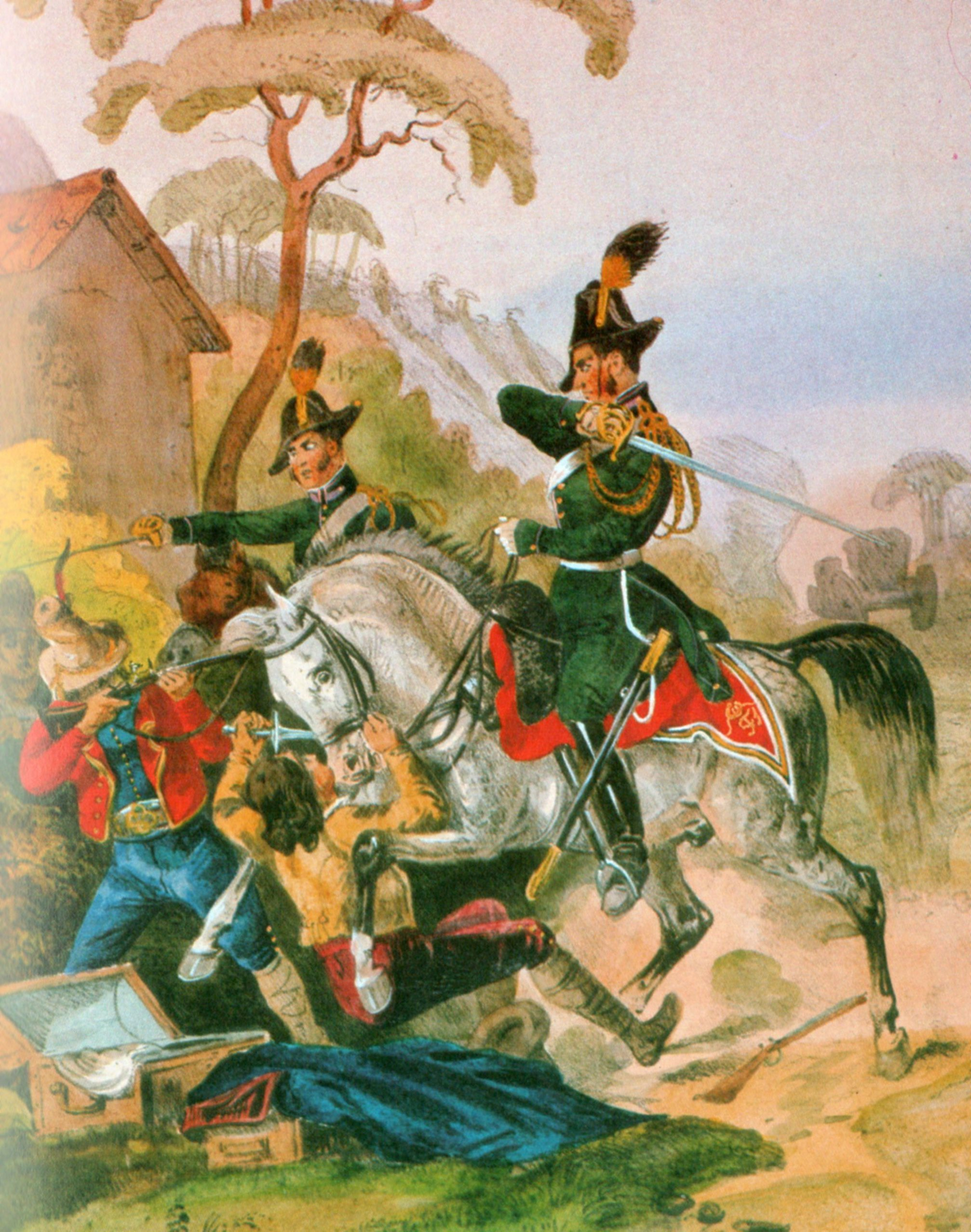
Lombard mounted gendarmerie (around 1840)

The idea to create a Gendarmerie military force charged with police duties originated from the Revolutions of 1848 in the Austrian Empire. It was formed on 8 June 1849 by order of Emperor Francis Joseph as a component of the k.k. Army, modelled on the Gendarmerieregiment in the Austrian Kingdom of Lombardy–Venetia incorporated upon the 1815 Congress of Vienna. Up to then 1776 set up "military police corps" existed in Austria as a militarily organized corps alone in large cities like Vienna, Lemberg, Krakau, Przemyśl or Prague. The unit so replaced a multitude of security bodies active in rural areas, villages, and small towns (bailiffs, rural dragoons or else).

Johann Franz Kempen, Baron of Fichtenstamm was appointed first General-Gendarmerie-Inspector. While it was originally a military corps responsible for the whole area of Austrian Empire, gradually over the second half of the nineteenth century it became responsible for public order. Initially composed of eighteen regiments and part of the army, its operational command was transferred to the Austrian Ministry for the Interior in 1860 and wholly severed from the armed forces in 1867. Nevertheless, training, uniforms, ranks, and even pay remained patterned after the army. The military origins were still represented in the retention of the old insignia, the flaming grenade, after the Gendamerie became a component of the civil administration in 1918. The predominantly grey uniform also owed its inspiration to the Austro-Hungarian Army.

Beside for the maintenance of the public order, the k.k. Gendarmerie became a vital instrument for suppression of constitutional or democratic ambitions during the post-revolutionary era of Austrian neo-absolutism in the 1850s and 60s, which brought it the hate of the middle class.

=== Austro-Hungarian Monarchy ===
Austian gendarms (after 1867)

After the Austro-Hungarian Compromise of 1867, the Cisleithanian k.k. Gendarmerie was no longer responsible for the Transleithanian lands controlled by the Hungarian Armed Forces (Hungarian: Magyar Honvédség). The control over the Kingdom of Croatia-Slavonia and the Principality of Transylavania did not pass to the Hungarian forces until 1876. In 1881 the Royal Hungarian (k.u.) Gendarmerie (Csendőrség) was established.

With the implementation of the Austrian Gendarmerie Law on 2 February 1876, it was finally separated from the Austro-Hungarian Army, though the newly established agency was still answerable to the Austrian Minister of Defence and its service members were officially part of the Cisleithanian Landwehr armed forces.

Before World War I, fingerprint analysis (dactyloscopy) and police dogs had been introduced. A special Alpine branch was formed in 1906, mainly to protect the part of Tyrol that bordered the Kingdom of Italy. Since then, alpine rescue operations and border patrols have remained an important Gendarmerie function. During the First World War, the unit was used in a number of roles including maintaining public order in the hinterland areas as military police (Feldgendarmerie), fighting espionage and partisans, and arresting deserters. In addition, they also provided scout, courier and orderly assistance to the Austro-Hungarian General Staff.

=== Disestablishment ===
After the end of the war and dissolution of Austria-Hungary at the end of 1918 the k.k, Gendarmerie forces were transformed and separated into individual national gendarmerie units, as Gendarmerie of Czechoslovakia or Bundesgendarmerie in newly created First Austrian Republic.

== Organisation ==
In each crown land, one (in Hungary three) of the regiments of about 1,000 men were stationed, commanded by a staff officer (major to colonel). Each regiment consisted of several duty detachments, each commanded by a senior officer (1st or 2nd class captain, after 1866 also first lieutenant or second lieutenant). The detachments were further divided into platoons (abolished after 1866), each commanded by a first or second lieutenant.

The number of gendarmes increased from 9,209 to 14,215 between 1894 and 1914, and the number of posts or stations rose from 2,337 to a total of 3,644. This meant that, on average, there were just under four gendarmes stationed at each post, including the post commander and sergeant.

Organisation of the k.k. Gendarmerie from 1876
Reg. No.	Seat	Crown land	Reg. No.	Seat	Crown land
1	Vienna	Lower Austria	9	Zadar	Dalmatia
2	Prague	Bohemia	10	(to Hungarian Defence Force)	Transylvania
3	Innsbruck	Tyrol and Vorarlberg	11	Linz	Upper Austria
4	Brno	Moravia	12	Ljubljana	Carniola
5	Lemberg	Galicia	13	Czernowitz	Bukovina
6	Graz	Styria	14	Klagenfurt	Carinthia
7	Trieste	Istria	15	Opava	Silesia
8	(to Hungarian Defence Force)	Croatia-Slavonia	16	Salzburg	Salzburg

== Biography ==
- Hermann Hinterstoisser/Peter Jung: Geschichte der Gendarmerie in Österreich-Ungarn. Adjustierung 1816 - 1918. Einsätze im Felde 1914–1918, Wien (Stöhr) 2000 (Schriftenreihe: Österreichische Militärgeschichte. Sonderband 2000–2). ISBN 3-901208-34-8.
