= Kostelec (Jičín District) =

- Municipality
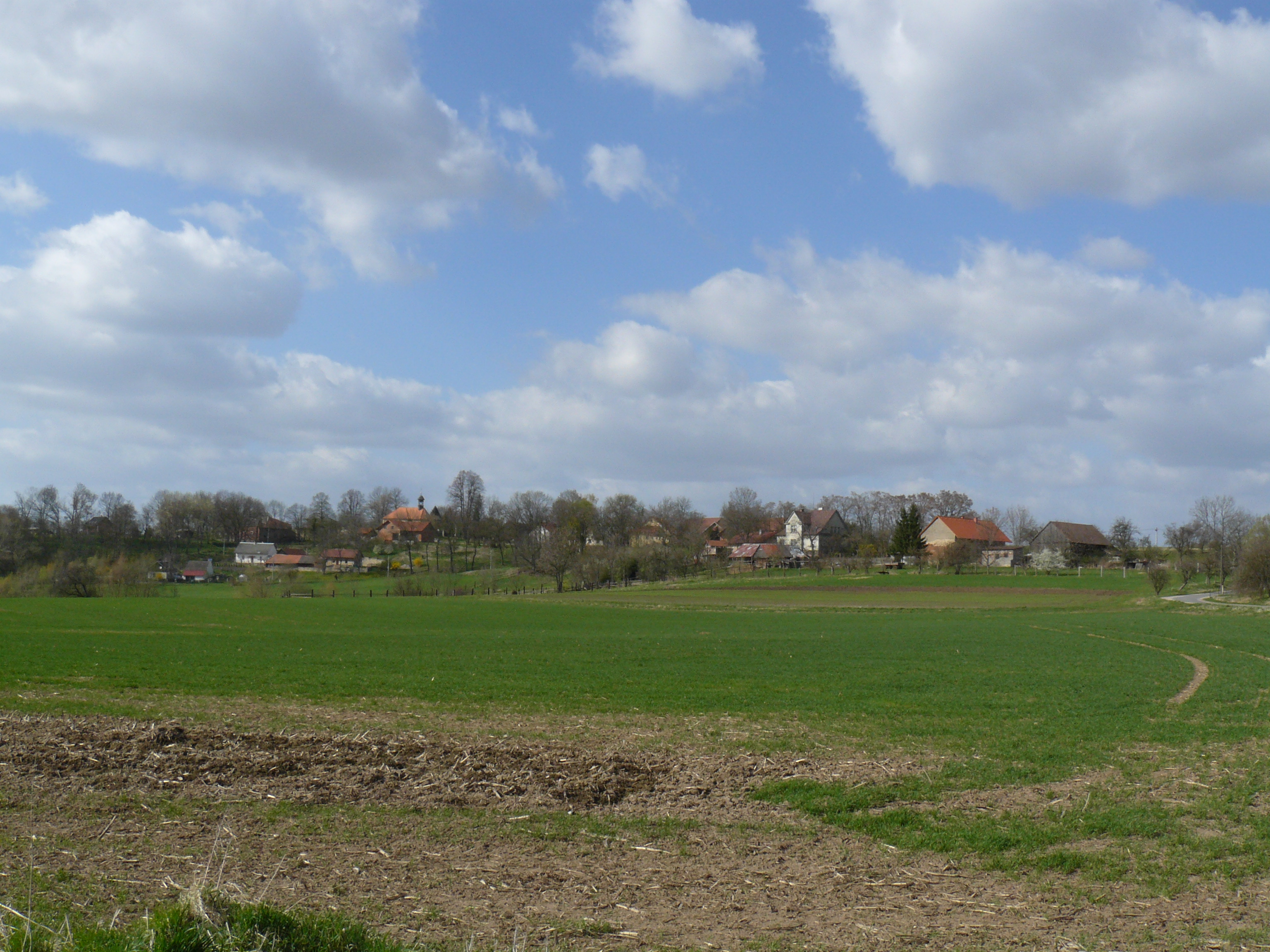
- General view

- Location in the Czech Republic
- Coordinates: 50°22′53″N 15°19′38″E
- Country: Czech Republic
- Region: Hradec Králové
- District: Jičín
- First mentioned: 1320

Area
  - Total: 2.26 km^{2} (0.87 sq mi)
- Elevation: 297 m (974 ft)

Population (2026-01-01)
  - Total: 38
  - Density: 17/km^{2} (44/sq mi)
- Time zone: UTC+1 (CET)
  - Summer (DST): UTC+2 (CEST)
- Postal code: 506 01
- Website: www.kostelec-jc.cz

Kostelec is a municipality and village in Jičín District in the Hradec Králové Region of the Czech Republic. It has about 40 inhabitants.

== Demographics ==
Historical population
Year	Pop.	±%
1869	126	—
1880	113	−10.3%
1890	127	+12.4%
1900	106	−16.5%
1910	139	+31.1%
1921	140	+0.7%
1930	126	−10.0%
1950	95	−24.6%
1961	68	−28.4%
1970	66	−2.9%
1980	63	−4.5%
1991	52	−17.5%
2001	42	−19.2%
2011	40	−4.8%
2021	37	−7.5%
Source: Censuses
