= 1938 Paraguayan Chaco Treaty referendum =

15 August 1938
- Are you in agreement with the amendment to Art. 120 of the National Constitution, which will read as follows: Paraguayan citizens, without distinction, who have turned eighteen years of age are eligible to vote.; Paraguayans residing abroad are voters.; Citizens are electors and eligible, without more restrictions than those established in this Constitution and in the law.; Foreigners with permanent residence will have the same rights in municipal elections.

Results
Choice	Votes	%
Yes	135,835	91.14%
No	13,204	8.86%
Valid votes	149,039	99.63%
Invalid or blank votes	559	0.37%
Total votes	149,598	100.00%

A referendum on the Chaco Treaty with Bolivia was held in Paraguay on 15 August 1938. The treaty was approved by 91% of voters.

== Background ==
Following the 1932–1935 Chaco War between Bolivia and Paraguay, a peace conference was held in Buenos Aires. An agreement, the Chaco Treaty, was signed on 21 July 1938, which required ratification within 20 days. In Bolivia the treaty was approved by Congress, while in Paraguay it was put to a referendum.

== Results ==
Choice	Votes	%
For	135,835	91.14
Against	13,204	8.86
Invalid/blank votes	559	–
Total	149,598	100
Registered voters/turnout		
Source: Direct Democracy
