= Bohuslav Fiala (general) =

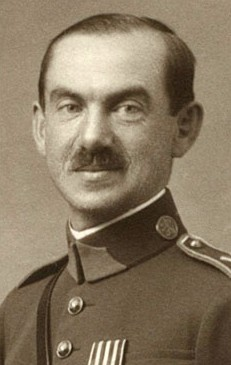
- Born: 29 January 1890; Frenštát pod Radhoštěm, Moravia, Austria-Hungary
- Died: 16 September 1964 (aged 74); Prague, Czechoslovakia
- Military career
- Allegiance: Austria-Hungary; Czechoslovakia
- Branch: Austro-Hungarian Army; Czechoslovak Legion; Czechoslovak Army
- Service years: 1907–1939
- Rank: Brigadier General
- Conflicts: World War I Sudeten German uprising

Bohuslav Fiala (29 January 1890 – 16 September 1964) was a Czech military leader. He was a brigadier general of the Austro-Hungarian Army and Czechoslovak Army who participated in World War I and the Sudeten German uprising.

== Biography ==
Fiala was born on 29 January 1890 in Frenštát pod Radhoštěm, Moravia, Austria-Hungary. He graduated from the Theresian Military Academy in Wiener Neustadt in 1907 and enlisted in the Austro-Hungarian Army. He participated in World War I and joined the Czechoslovak Legion in Russia. After returning to his homeland, Fiala worked at the General Staff. He was promoted to brigadier general in July 1934. During the mobilization in 1938, Fiala became Chief of Staff of the Mobilized Army Headquarters.

After demobilization, he returned to the General Staff. On 15 March 1939, Fiala issued an order to destroy all important files of the General Staff. During the occupation, Fiala actively participated in the resistance, but in December 1939 he was arrested. He was released in March 1942. Subsequently, he again joined the resistance and in 1945, he was one of the main leaders of the Prague Uprising. After the re-creation of the Czechoslovak Republic, Fiala worked again in the General Staff, but in October 1945 he was sent on vacation. In 1946 he retired. In 1953, his pension was taken away and Fiala was forced to work. He found employment in an elevator factory, where he worked as an accountant and later a porter. He died on 16 September 1964 in Prague.

== Awards ==
- Czechoslovakia: Czechoslovak War Cross 1918
- Czechoslovakia: Czechoslovak Revolutionary Medal
- Czechoslovakia: Czechoslovak Medal of Victory

=== Foreign Awards ===
- France: Legion of Honour, 5th class
- Lithuania: Order of the Cross of Vytis
- Romania: Order of the Crown, III class
- Romania: Order of the Crown, II Class
- Yugoslavia: Order of the Yugoslav Crown, II Class
