= Kostelec u Heřmanova Městce =

- Municipality
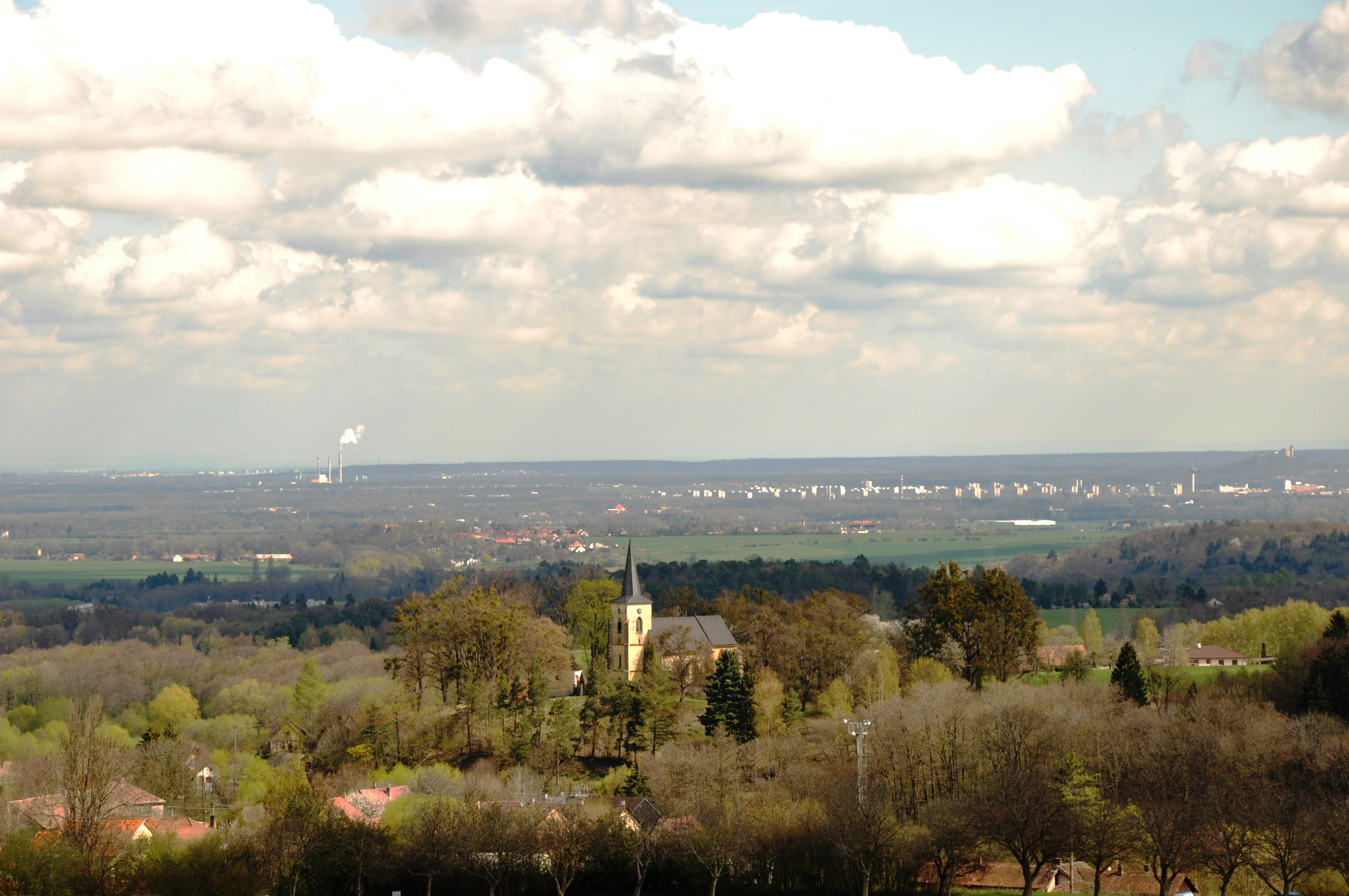
- Church of Saints Peter and Paul

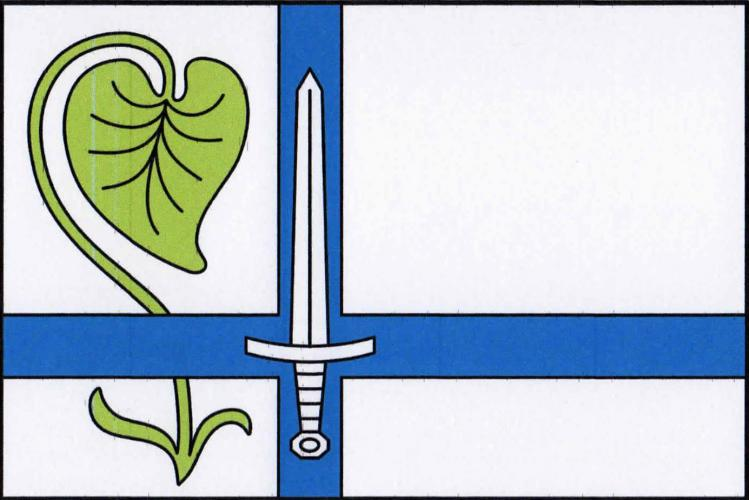
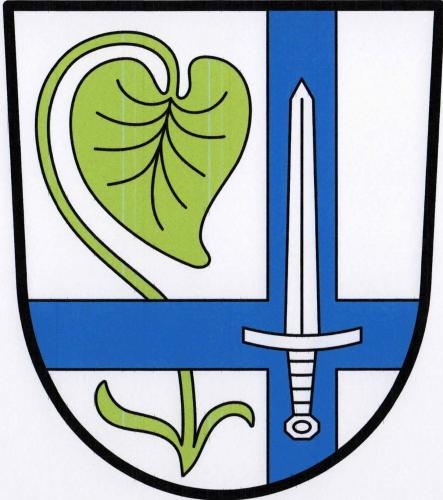
- Flag Coat of arms

- Location in the Czech Republic
- Coordinates: 49°55′24″N 15°39′6″E
- Country: Czech Republic
- Region: Pardubice
- District: Chrudim
- First mentioned: 1257

Area
  - Total: 7.48 km^{2} (2.89 sq mi)
- Elevation: 330 m (1,080 ft)

Population (2026-01-01)
  - Total: 390
  - Density: 52/km^{2} (140/sq mi)
- Time zone: UTC+1 (CET)
  - Summer (DST): UTC+2 (CEST)
- Postal code: 538 03
- Website: www.kostelec-u-hm.cz

Kostelec u Heřmanova Městce is a municipality and village in Chrudim District in the Pardubice Region of the Czech Republic. It has about 400 inhabitants.

== Administrative division ==
Kostelec u Heřmanova Městce consists of two municipal parts (in brackets population according to the 2021 census):

- Kostelec u Heřmanova Městce (344)
- Tasovice (16)

== Demographics ==
Historical population
Year	Pop.	±%
1869	487	—
1880	596	+22.4%
1890	595	−0.2%
1900	607	+2.0%
1910	605	−0.3%
1921	557	−7.9%
1930	549	−1.4%
1950	431	−21.5%
1961	433	+0.5%
1970	345	−20.3%
1980	298	−13.6%
1991	234	−21.5%
2001	266	+13.7%
2011	324	+21.8%
2021	360	+11.1%
Source: Censuses
