= Jan Syrový =

Czechoslovak general and prime minister of Czechoslovakia

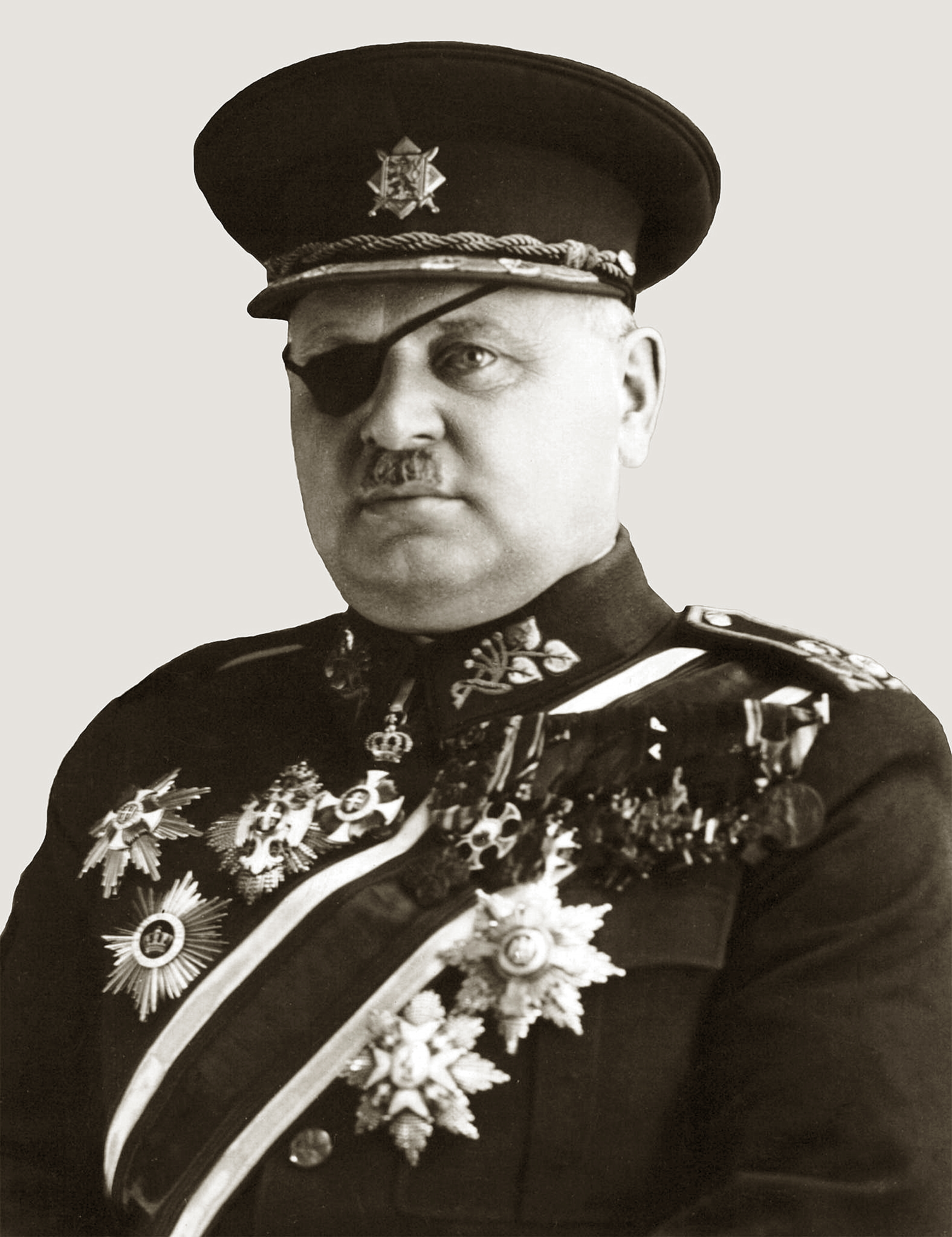
- Jan Syrový in 1938

Prime Minister of Czechoslovakia
- In office 22 September 1938 – 1 December 1938
- Preceded by: Milan Hodža
- Succeeded by: Rudolf Beran

Personal details
- Born: 24 January 1888 Třebíč, Moravia, Austria-Hungary
- Died: 17 October 1970 (aged 82) Prague, Czechoslovakia

Military service
- Branch/service: Austro-Hungarian Army; Czechoslovak Legions; Czechoslovak Army
- Rank: General
- Battles/wars: World War I; Battle of Zborov (1917); Russian Civil War; Revolt of the Czechoslovak Legion; Simbirsk Operation; Capture of Tyumen; Undeclared German–Czechoslovak War; Battle of Bruntál; Battle of Libá; Battles of Brandov; Battle of Rychnůvka; Relief of Načetin; Relief of Pohraničí; Sudeten German uprising; Counterinsurgency in Cheb; Counterinsurgency in Frýdlant; Counterinsurgency in Šluknov; Counterinsurgency in Varnsdorf; German Occupation of Czechoslovakia

Jan Syrový (24 January 1888 – 17 October 1970) was a Czechoslovak general who was the prime minister of Czechoslovakia during the Munich Crisis.

== Early life and military career ==
Jan Syrový studied building at a technical school. Following his graduation in 1906, he became a one-year volunteer in the Austro-Hungarian army. After that, he studied at a technical college in Russia. During World War I, he fought in the Czechoslovak Legions of the Russian Army and lost his right eye at the Battle of Zborov.

By the end of the war, he commanded the Legions and the anti-Bolshevik forces on the Trans-Siberian Railway. A well-known veteran commander, he served as Chief of Staff of the Czechoslovak Army from 1926 to 1933 and as its general inspector from 1933 to 1938. He helped to prepare the Czechoslovak Air Force with the help of Jan Antonín Baťa and moved military personnel and materials away from Nazi Germany.

== Munich Crisis ==
When Milan Hodža's government resigned on 23 September 1938, President Edvard Beneš appointed Syrový to head a national unity government. Syrový demurred at first by insisting that he was just a soldier, not a politician, and that he lacked the qualifications and the relevant experience for such an important post. Beneš told Syrový that the nation needed him and added that as a soldier, Syrový should consider it not as an offer but an order. With some reluctance, Syrový accepted and took the defence portfolio as well.

Barely a week after becoming prime minister, he was forced to accept the terms of the Munich Agreement on 30 September. Announcing the acceptance of the agreement in a nationwide radio address, he stated that Czechoslovakia was not in a position to turn the agreement down because without British or French support, the country was outnumbered and any conflict would result in severe casualties. "We were abandoned", he said. "We stand alone".

After the resignation of Beneš on 5 October, Syrový assumed most presidential duties, in accord with the Czechoslovak Constitution until Emil Hácha was duly elected president on 30 November 1938.

He resigned the premiership on 1 December 1938 and remained as minister of national defence until 27 April 1939. He did not join the anti-German resistance since he was too well-known a figure for his involvement to be anything other than a liability. However, he arranged the transfer of substantial sums from a Legionary relief fund to assist the resistance and the people facing persecution.

== Later life ==
On 14 May 1945, in the immediate aftermath of the war, Syrový was arrested and charged with collaboration although he had consciously steered clear of that as far as his office allowed. In a show trial of alleged collaborators in 1947, the National Court found him guilty, along with Rudolf Beran, and sentenced him to 20 years of imprisonment in severe conditions.

Released in 1960 by Antonín Novotný's amnesty, Syrový was left with no pension or any means of maintenance, and the communist regime barred him from employment. Eventually, he was allowed to work as a nightwatchman, guarding Luděk Marold's panorama of the Battle of Lipany. Not until late 1967 would the regime grant him a limited retirement pension.

Syrový was deeply wounded by the verdict of the National Court and remained so for the rest of his life. His own conscience was clear, and he never came to terms with the apparent injustice of the decision. He reviewed his trial in an interview for the Report Magazine in 1968 and stated that there were three critical pieces of evidence laid against him. The first was a snapshot of himself shaking hands with Adolf Hitler during a meeting that he was obliged to attend at the Prague Castle. Hitler had made a speech of reassurance as to Czechoslovakia's future under the 'protection' of the Reich and then held out his hand to Syrový, and the photographers immediately took a picture.

Another photograph provided the second piece of evidence, which was taken at a government banquet that showed Syrový sitting alongside Konrad Henlein. Syrový stated that the picture was taken out of context, to be used for Nazi propaganda.

The third piece of critical evidence was an arms contract with the Nazis. Syrový stated the weapons sold had been obsolete items from the First World War, which were no longer of any use to Czechoslovakia, and that the weapons had been sold to German private companies. He also stated that the decision to sell was made ultimately not by him alone but by the government as a whole. Syrový felt that if the Czechoslovak allies had offered their promised help, he would never have had to accept the Munich Agreement, but under the circumstances, the Czechoslovak Army had no chance of success on its own.

Syrový died on 17 October 1970.

== Decorations ==
Awarded by Belgium:

Order of the Crown, in the grade of: Grand Officer
Croix de Guerre 1914-18

Awarded by Czechoslovakia:

Czechoslovak War Cross 1918: with four linden branches
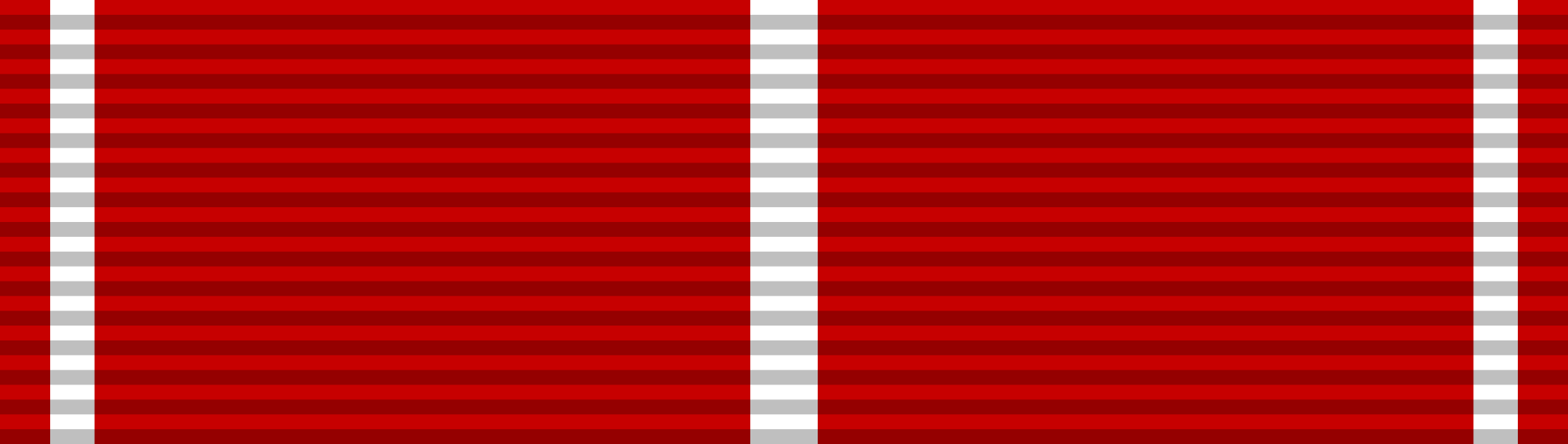
Order of the Falcon: with swords
Czechoslovak Revolutionary Medal 1914–18 with clasps: "Č.D.", "Zborov" and numbers "1", "2"
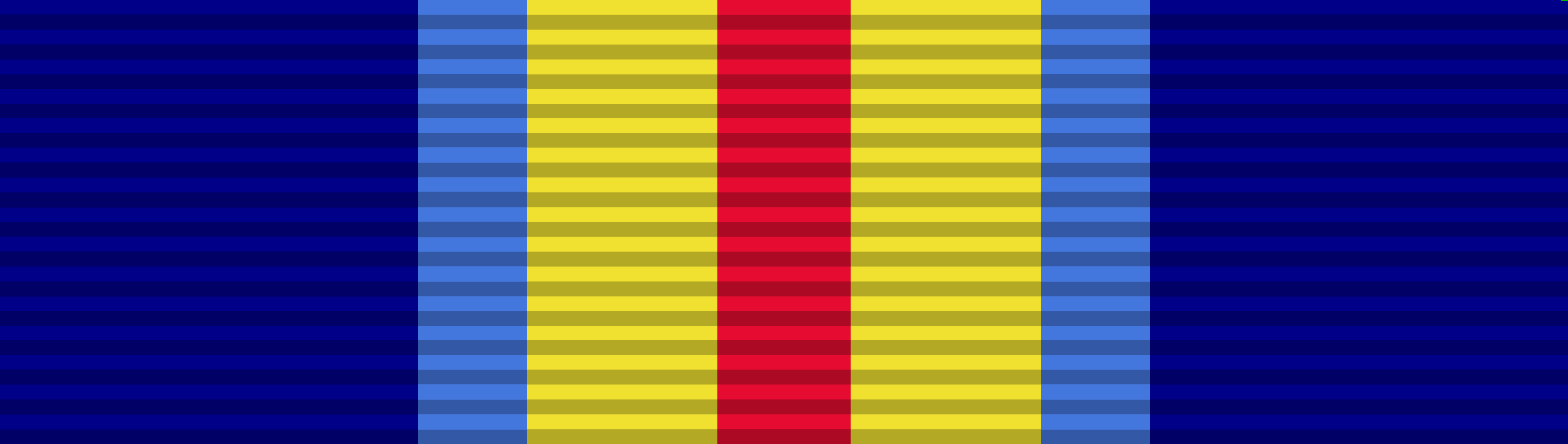
Czechoslovak Medal of Victory 1918

Awarded by Estonia:

Military Order of the Cross of the Eagle, for the Protection of the Country: I. class

Awarded by France:

Légion d'honneur, in the grade of: Grand Officier

Légion d'honneur, in the grade of: Commandeur
Légion d'honneur, in the grade of: Officier
Légion d'honneur, in the grade of: Chevalier [Knight]

Croix de Guerre 1914-18: with palme

From the right: Špidlík, Švec, Syrový Image taken one day before Syrový lost his eye.

Awarded by Italy:

Order of the Italian Crown: II. class
War Merit Cross

Awarded by Japan:

Order of the Sacred Treasure: II. class

Awarded by Yugoslavia:

Order of St. Sava: I. class
Order of the White Eagle: I. class

Order of the White Eagle: II. class

Order of the Karađorđe's Star with Swords : II. class

Awarded by Lithuania:

Order of Vytis Cross: Cross, II. class

Awarded by Latvia:

Order of Lāčplēsis: II. class
Order of the Three Stars: II. class

Awarded by Morocco:

Nischan el Quissam Alaouite: I. class

Awarded by Poland:

Order of Polonia Restituta: II. class

Awarded by Romania:

Order of the Star of Romania: I. class
Order of the Crown: II. class
Order of Faithful Service: I. class
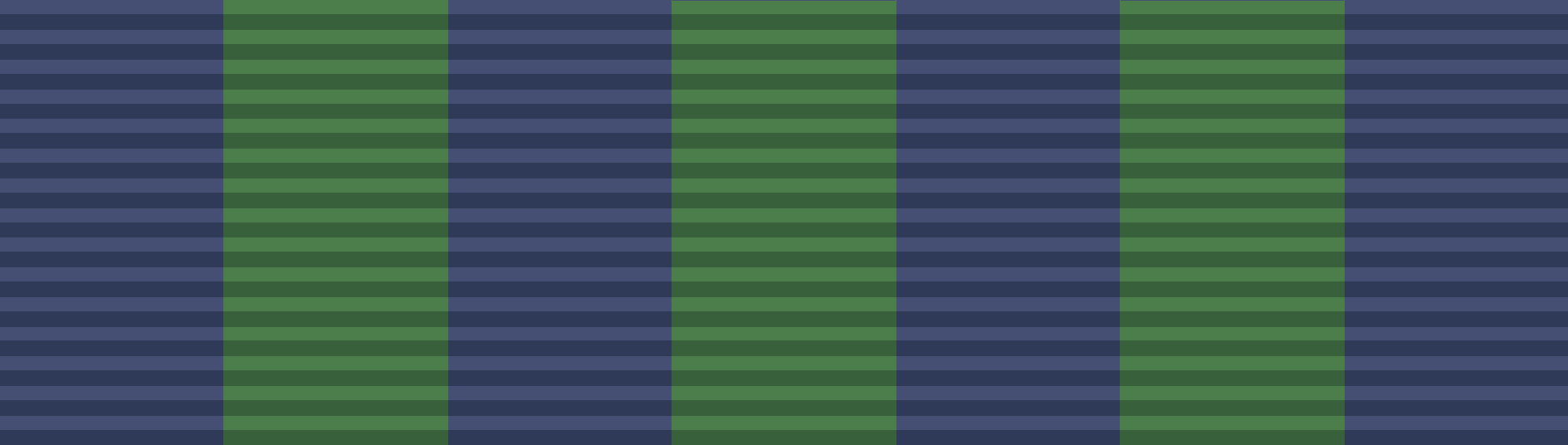
Commemorative Cross 1916-19: with the clasp: "Siberia"

Awarded by Imperial Russia:

Order of St. Vladimir: IV. class
Order of St. Anne: IV. class
Order of Saint Stanislaus (Imperial House of Romanov): III. class
Cross of St. George: IV. class

Awarded by Greece:

Order of the Phoenix: I. class
Medal of Military Merit

Awarded by Tunisia:

Order of Nischan el Iftikchar: I. class

Awarded by Great Britain:

Order of the Bath, in the grade of: Knight Commander [KCB]

== See also ==
- Occupation of Czechoslovakia
- List of prime ministers of Czechoslovakia

Government offices
| Preceded by Jiří Stříbrný | Minister of Defence of Czechoslovakia; 1926 | Succeeded by František Udržal |
| Preceded by František Machník | Minister of Defence of Czechoslovakia; 1938–1939 | Succeeded by Ludvík Svoboda (after World War II) |
| Preceded by Milan Hodža | Prime Minister of Czechoslovakia; 1938 | Succeeded by Rudolf Beran |
Political offices
| Preceded by Edvard Beneš | President of Czechoslovakia (acting); 1938 | Succeeded by Emil Hácha |
