= State Defense Guard (Czechoslovakia) =

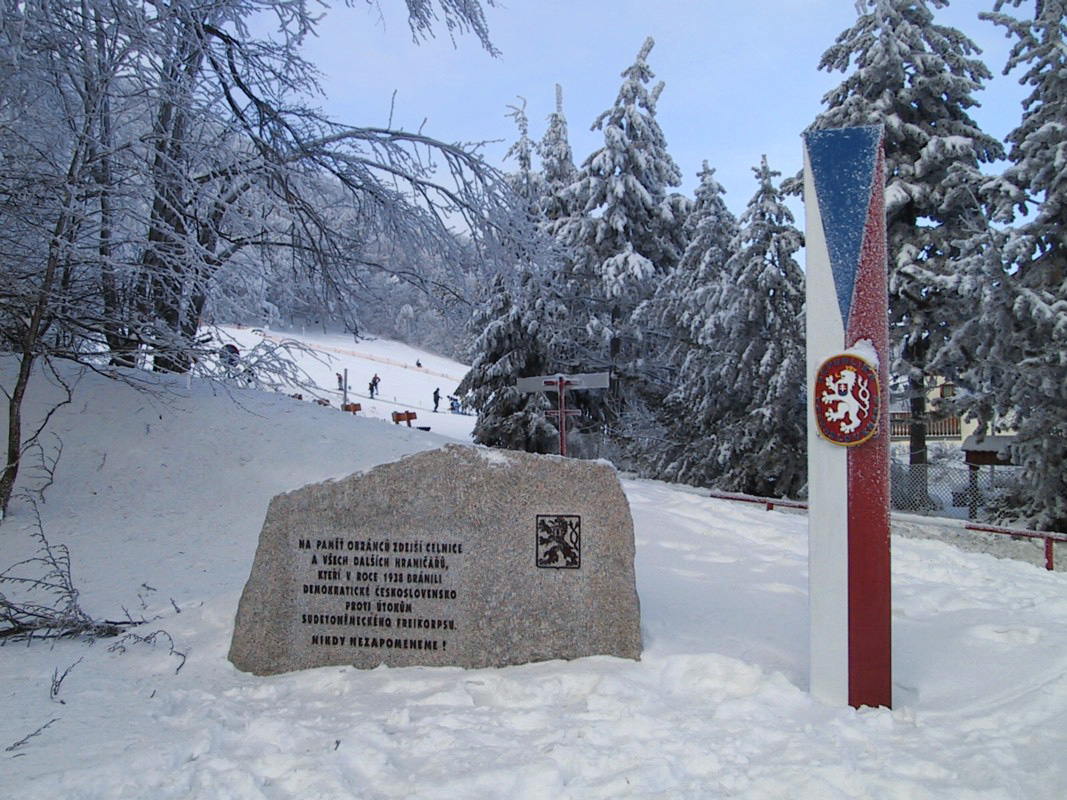
Memorial in honour of State Defense Guard at state border in Lusatian Mountains

State Defense Guard (in Czech Stráž obrany státu, SOS, in Slovak Stráž obrany štátu) was a military service established in 1936 to protect the borders of Czechoslovakia.

From 1918 to 1936 border of Czechoslovakia was protected by a "finance guard" (finanční stráž), an armed branch of the Ministry of Finance. Their main task was to carry out customs duty, while border protection was secondary. For over a decade army and police leadership had suggested to set up an organisation of higher military value. Amid international tensions the new service was established in 1936.

The roles of the defense guard were:

- Border security
- Law enforcement
- Customs enforcement

Members of the guard were local gendarmes (četníci), existing finance guards and members of the state police. Later citizens loyal to Czechoslovakia were incorporated (for example, many members of the sports organisation Sokol or active anti-fascist Germans). Plans were created to support the guard with regular army units to handle local conflicts.

The planned size of the service was to be 38 battalions, but only 31 had been mustered (one of these inland, in Prague). Their equipment were pistols, rifles, light machine guns and grenades. There was not enough time to equip the units with heavy machine guns. In case of attack, the guard was to delay the enemy until the army could respond.

Manpower of the guard in September 1938 was 29,611 men (4,917 local policemen, 1,674 members of state police, 6,438 finance guards, 14,755 army reservists, 1,827 army members).

As the tensions between Czechoslovakia, local Germans and Nazi Germany grew, the guard was deployed on the border during May 1938 and stayed there until end of September, when Sudetenland was ceded to Germany. During September the guard fought low-level warfare against local German partisans (Sudetendeutsches Freikorps) and commandos from Germany. After the loss of borderland, the SOS moved inland to new positions. The clashes still occurred but on a smaller level.

As a result of First Vienna Award Czechoslovakia was forced to give up territory to Poland and Hungary (southern Slovakia and Carpathian Ruthenia). While conflicts with Polish forces were minor, clashes with Hungarian forces and partisans (Szabadczapatok) were more intense (starting in November 1938). From January to March 1939 (until Czechoslovakia was dissolved) heavy clashes occurred between Hungarian forces and guard and the army in Ruthenia. Czechoslovak units were forced to withdraw in three directions - to Slovakia, Poland and Romania. During March the units also faced local insurgents (Sičovci) attempting to establish an independent Ruthenian state.

Estimated warfare losses (both guard and the army) from May 1938 to April 1939 are 171 dead, 404 injured, over thousand of soldiers taken prisoner and abducted to Germany proper. Losses in Ruthenia are estimated to be 40 dead, 120 injured, and 17 missing.

On December 21, 1939, the government of the Protectorate of Bohemia and Moravia disbanded the remaining parts of the guard. In the Slovak State the guard was disbanded a little later. After the war the organisation was not restored. After the communist takeover of power in 1948, the new government formed a special branch of the army called the Border Guard (Pohraniční služba), which was tasked with border protection.

== Literature ==
- Jaroslav Beneš: Stráž obrany státu 1936-1939. Publisher: Čs. obec legionářská - Jednota Mladá Boleslav, 2007, ISBN 978-80-86011-34-9. The monograph describes history and structure of SOS. It also covers their activity in years 1938-39.
