= Vrbatův Kostelec =

- Municipality
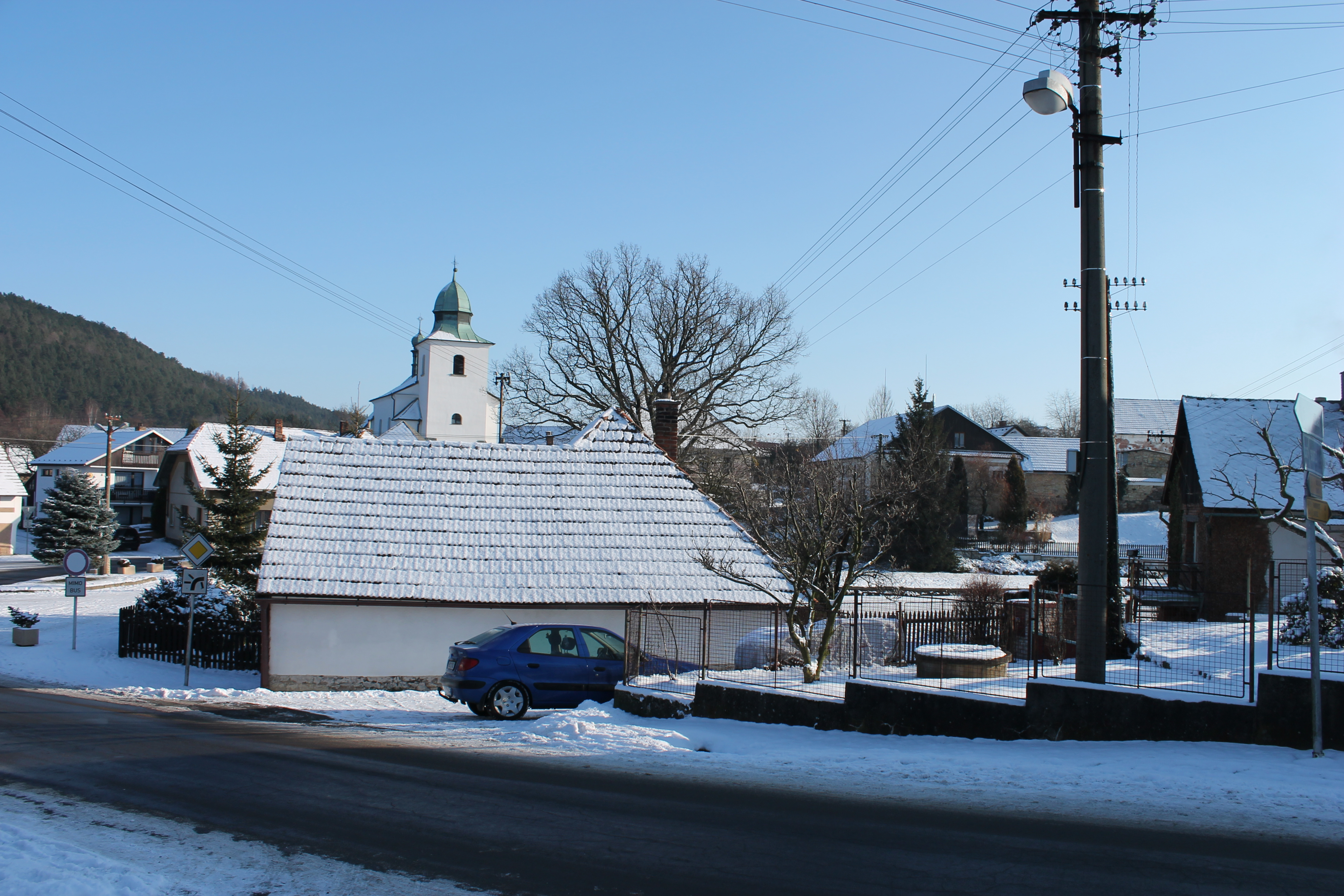
- View towards the Church of the Corpus Christi

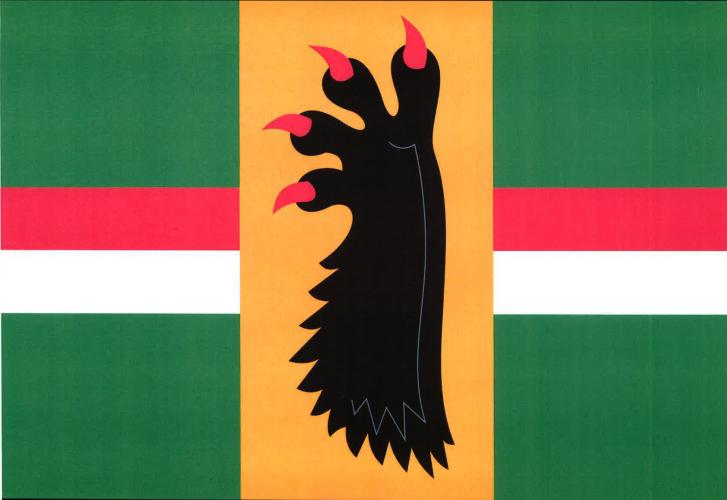
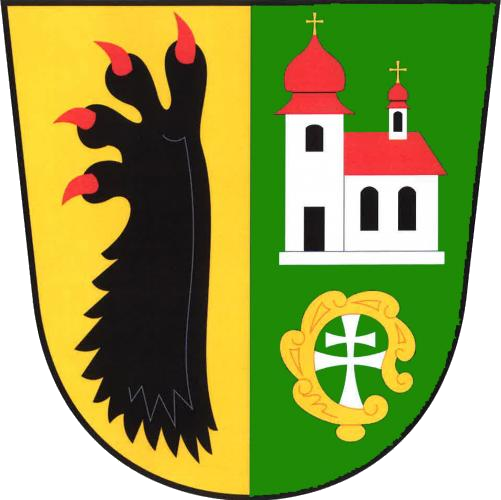
- Flag Coat of arms

- Location in the Czech Republic
- Coordinates: 49°51′23″N 15°56′28″E
- Country: Czech Republic
- Region: Pardubice
- District: Chrudim
- First mentioned: 1073

Area
  - Total: 5.45 km^{2} (2.10 sq mi)
- Elevation: 408 m (1,339 ft)

Population (2026-01-01)
  - Total: 374
  - Density: 68.6/km^{2} (178/sq mi)
- Time zone: UTC+1 (CET)
  - Summer (DST): UTC+2 (CEST)
- Postal codes: 538 51, 539 56, 539 73
- Website: www.vrbatuvkostelec.cz

Vrbatův Kostelec is a municipality and village in Chrudim District in the Pardubice Region of the Czech Republic. It has about 400 inhabitants.

== Administrative division ==
Vrbatův Kostelec consists of four municipal parts (in brackets population according to the 2021 census):

- Vrbatův Kostelec (251)
- Cejřov (17)
- Habroveč (49)
- Louka (37)

== Demographics ==
Historical population
Year	Pop.	±%
1869	658	—
1880	648	−1.5%
1890	597	−7.9%
1900	689	+15.4%
1910	758	+10.0%
1921	754	−0.5%
1930	877	+16.3%
1950	658	−25.0%
1961	623	−5.3%
1970	513	−17.7%
1980	480	−6.4%
1991	407	−15.2%
2001	349	−14.3%
2011	316	−9.5%
2021	354	+12.0%
Source: Censuses
