= Sudeten Germans =

Ethnic Germans living in the Czech lands before 1945

Sudetendeutsche

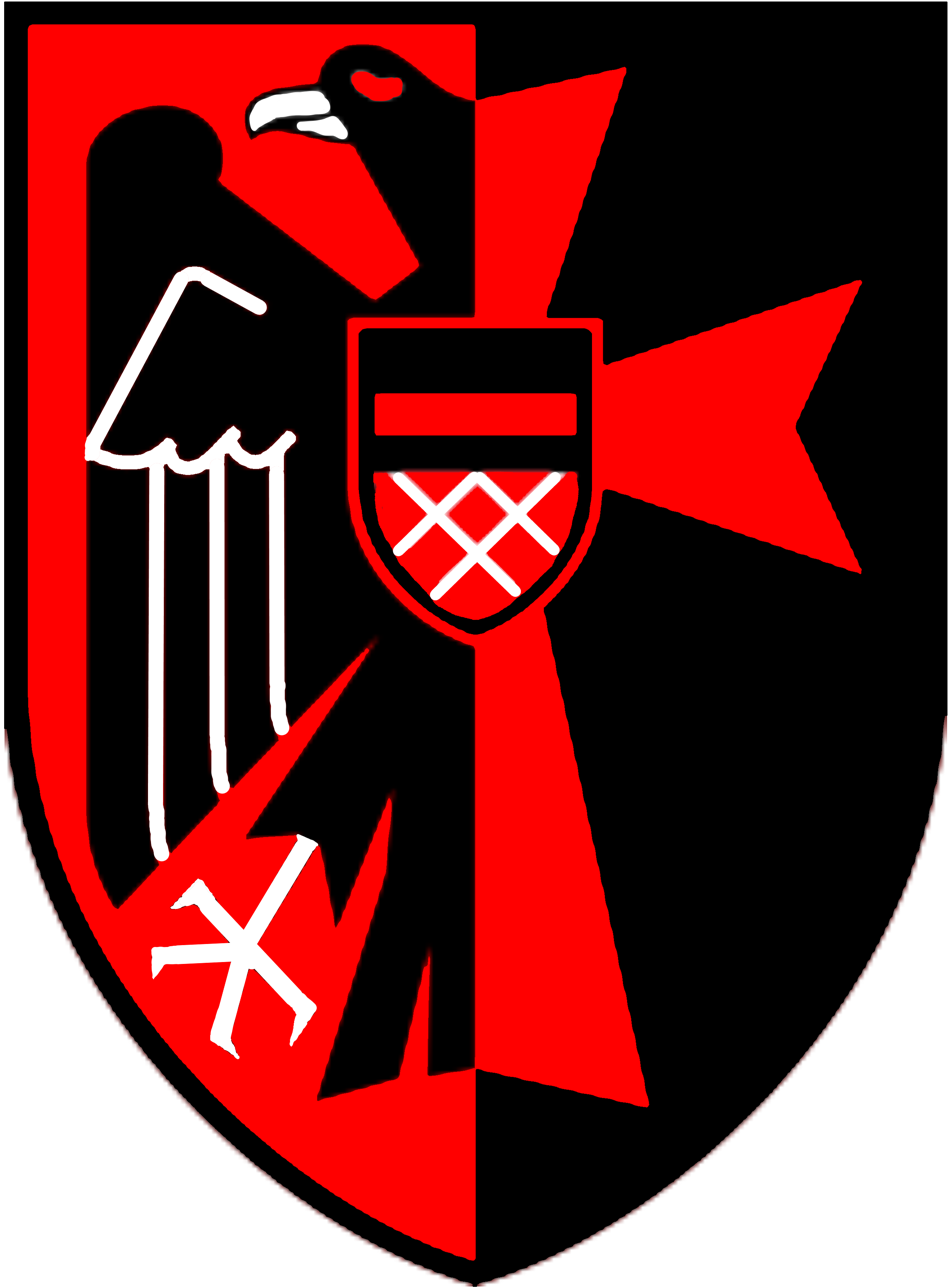
- Flag of the Sudeten Germans and the coat of arms of the Sudeten German Homeland Association

Total population
- c. 3,252,000 in 1910; 39,106 in 2001

Regions with significant populations
- Bohemia, Moravia and Czech Silesia. Many of them also live in Germany and Austria, as well in Slovakia.

Languages
- German, Czech

Religion
- Roman Catholic majority Lutheran Protestant minority

Related ethnic groups
- Germans, Austrians and Czechs

German Bohemians, (Note: German: Deutschböhmen und Deutschmährer; Czech: čeští Němci a moravští Němci) later known as Sudeten Germans, (Note: German: Sudetendeutsche; Czech: sudetští Němci) are ethnic Germans living in the Czech lands of the Bohemian Crown, which later became an integral part of Czechoslovakia. Before 1945, over three million German Bohemians constituted about 23% of the population of the whole country and about 29.5% of the population of Bohemia and Moravia. Ethnic Germans migrated into the Kingdom of Bohemia, an electoral territory of the Holy Roman Empire, from the 11th century, mostly in the border region which was later called the Sudetenland, named after the Sudeten Mountains.

The process of German expansion was known as Ostsiedlung ("Settling of the East"). The name "Sudeten Germans" was adopted during rising nationalism after the fall of Austria-Hungary in the aftermath of First World War. After the Munich Agreement (1938), the Sudetenland became part of Germany.

After the Second World War, most of the German-speaking population (mostly Roman Catholic with relatively few Protestants) was expelled from Czechoslovakia to Germany and Austria.

The area that became known as the Sudetenland possessed chemical works and lignite mines as well as textile, china, and glass factories. The Bohemian border with Bavaria was inhabited primarily by Germans. The Upper Palatine Forest, which extends along the Bavarian frontier and into the agricultural areas of southern Bohemia, was an area of German settlement. Moravia contained patches of "locked" German territory to the north and south. More characteristic were the German language islands, which were towns inhabited by German minorities and surrounded by Czechs. Sudeten Germans were mostly Roman Catholics, a legacy of centuries of Austrian Habsburg rule.

Not all ethnic Germans lived in isolated and well-defined areas; for historical reasons, Czechs and Germans mixed in many places, and Czech-German bilingualism and code-switching was quite common. Nevertheless, during the second half of the 19th century, Czechs and Germans began to create separate cultural, educational, political and economic institutions, which kept both groups semi-isolated from each other. This semi-isolated status continued until the end of the Second World War, when almost all of the ethnic Germans were expelled.

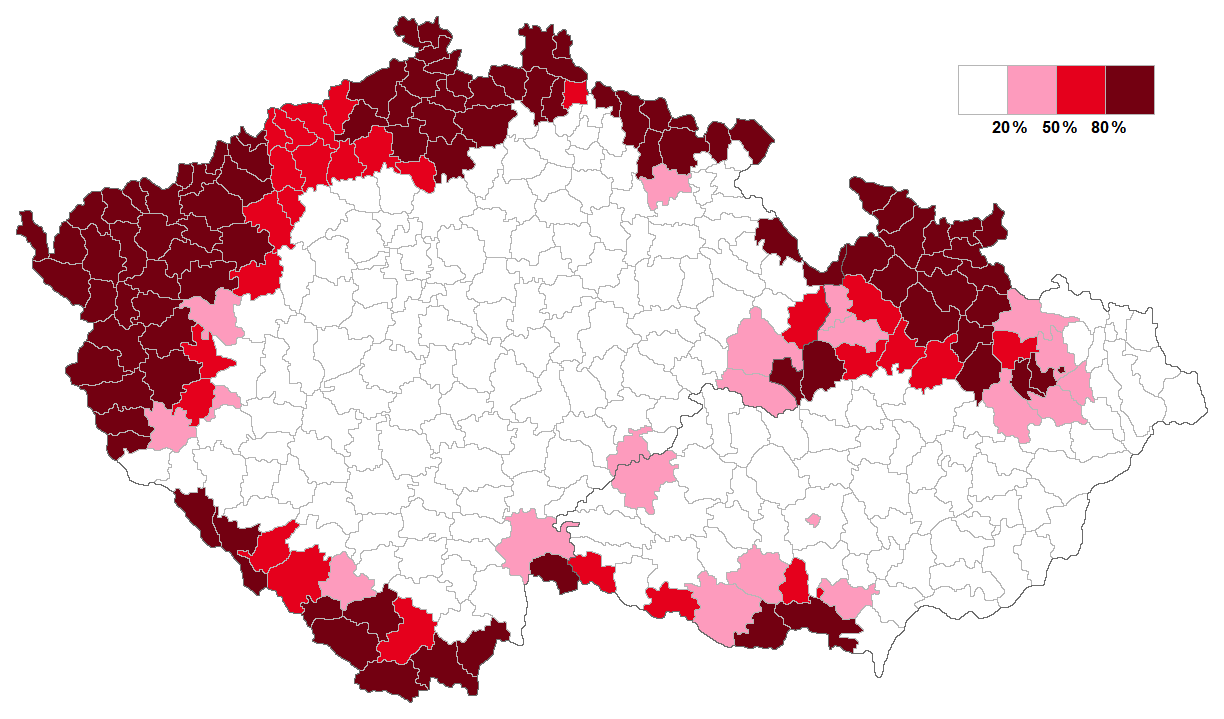
Czech districts by ethnic German population in 1930: 0–20% 20–50% 50–80% 80–100%

== Names ==
In the English language, ethnic Germans who originated in the Kingdom of Bohemia were traditionally referred to as "German Bohemians". This appellation utilizes the broad definition of Bohemia, which includes all of the three Bohemian crown lands: Bohemia, Moravia and (Austrian) Silesia. In the German language, it is more common to distinguish among the three lands, hence the prominent terms Deutschböhmen (German Bohemians), Deutschmährer (German Moravians) and Deutschschlesier (German Silesians). Even in German the broader use of "Bohemian" is also found.

The term "Sudeten Germans" (Sudetendeutsche) came about during rising ethnic nationalism in the early 20th century, after the fall of the Austro-Hungarian Empire in the First World War. It coincided with the rise of another new term, "the Sudetenland", which referred only to the parts of the former Kingdom of Bohemia that were inhabited predominantly by ethnic Germans. These names were derived from the Sudeten Mountains, which form the northern border of the Bohemian lands. As these terms were heavily used by the Nazi German regime to push forward the creation of a Greater Germanic Reich, many contemporary Germans avoid them in favour of the traditional names.

== Before the First World War ==
=== Middle Ages and early modern period ===
There have been ethnic Germans living in the Bohemian crown lands since the Middle Ages. In the late 12th and in the 13th century the Přemyslid rulers promoted the colonisation of certain areas of their lands by German settlers from the adjacent lands of Bavaria, Franconia, Upper Saxony and Austria during the Ostsiedlung migration.

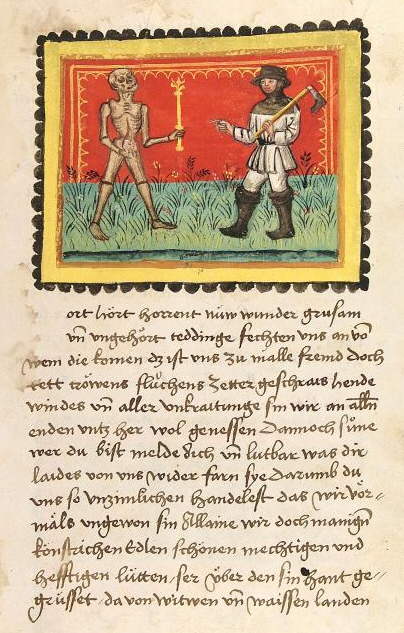
Der Ackermann aus Böhmen, 15th-century manuscript, Heidelberg University

In 1348, the Luxembourg king Charles I, also King of the Romans and Holy Roman Emperor (as Charles IV) from 1355, founded the Charles University in Prague (Alma Mater Carolina), the first in Central Europe, attended by large German student nations, and its language of education was Latin. Czechs made up about 20% of the students at the time of its founding, and the rest was primarily German. A culturally-significant example of German Bohemian prose from the Middle Ages is the story Der Ackermann aus Böhmen ("The Ploughman from Bohemia"), written in Early New High German by Johannes von Tepl (c. 1350 – 1414) in Žatec (Saaz), who probably had studied liberal arts in Prague.

For centuries, German Bohemians played important roles in the economy and politics of the Bohemian lands. For example, forest glass production was a common industry for German Bohemians. Though they were living beyond the medieval Kingdom of Germany, an independent German Bohemian awareness, however, was not widespread, and for a long time, it played no decisive role in everyday life. Individuals were usually seen as Bohemians, Moravians or Silesians. Defining events later in German Bohemian history were the Hussite Wars, the occupation of Bohemia by the Czech Brethren, the Thirty Years' War, when the Lands of the Bohemian Crown were severely affected, which caused the immigration of further German settlers.

After the death of King Louis II of Hungary and Bohemia in the 1526 Battle of Mohács, the Habsburg Archduke Ferdinand of Austria became King of Bohemia, which became a constituent state of the Habsburg monarchy. With the rise of the Habsburgs in Bohemia after the 1620 Battle of White Mountain, the old Bohemian nobility became virtually meaningless. Increasingly, the Bohemian crown lands were ruled from the Austrian capital, Vienna, which favoured the dominance of the German language and German culture. On the other hand, the 18th-century Silesian Wars started by Prussian King Frederick II of Prussia against Austria resulted in the loss of the traditionally-Bohemian crown land and weakened Germans in the remaining parts of Bohemia. As the 19th century arrived, resistance to the German domination began to develop among the Czechs.

=== Austria-Hungary ===
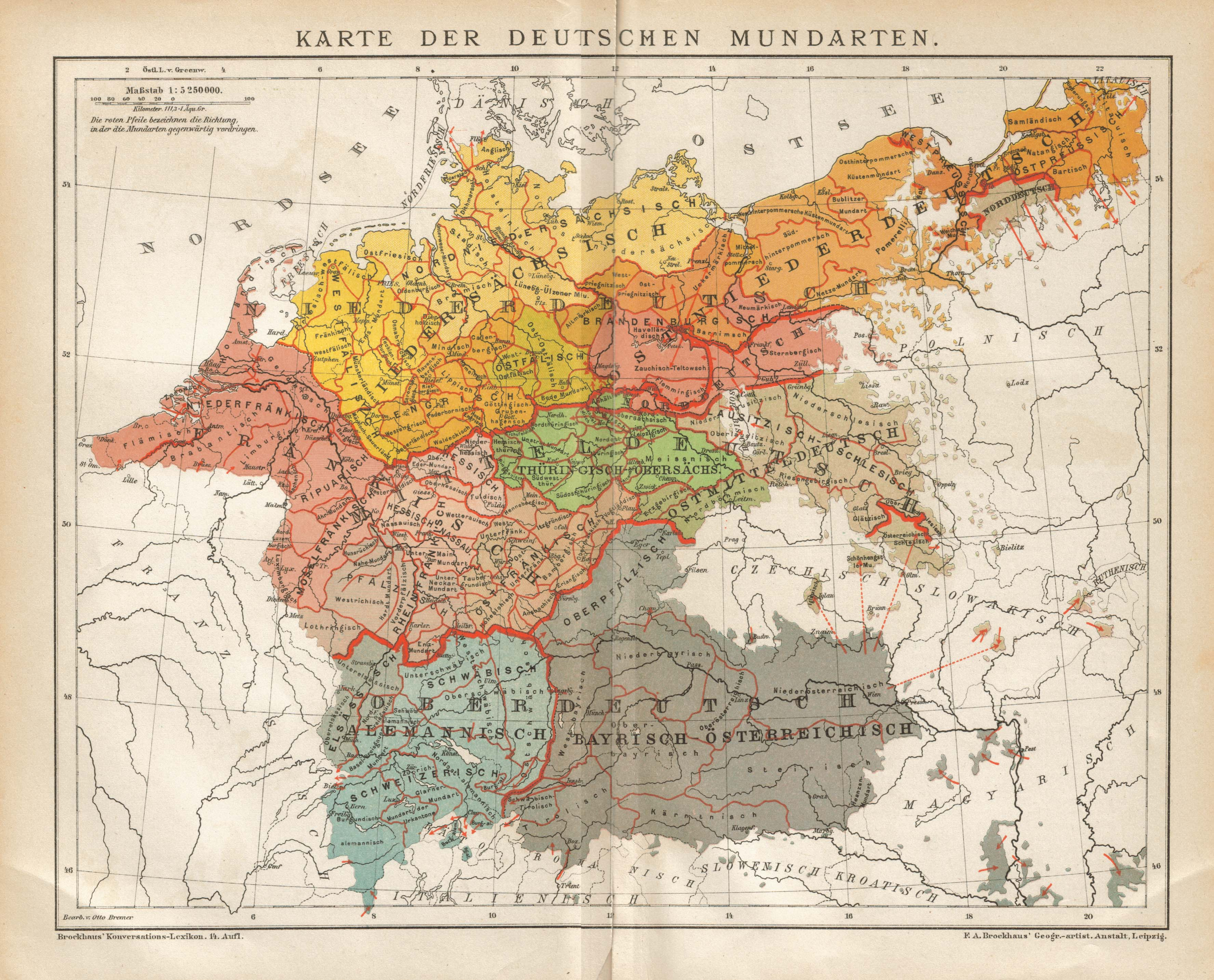
German dialects with overlaps to Sudeten

After the revolutions of 1848 and the rise of ethnic nationalism, nervousness about ethnic tensions in Austria-Hungary resulted in a prevailing equality between Czechs and German Bohemians. Each ethnicity tried to retain, in regions in which it was the majority, sovereignty over its own affairs. Czechs and Germans generally maintained separate schools, churches and public institutions. Nevertheless, despite the separation, Germans often understood some Czech, and Czechs often spoke some German. Cities like Prague, however, saw more mixing between the ethnicities and also had large populations of Jews; Germans living with Czechs fluently spoke Czech and code-switched between German and Czech when talking to Czechs and other Germans. Jews in Bohemia often spoke German and sometimes Yiddish. The famed writer Franz Kafka exemplifies the diversity of Bohemia since he was a Prague-based German-speaking Jew, but his surname was of Czech origin.

In 1867, the equality of Austrian citizens of all ethnicities was guaranteed by the Austro-Hungarian Compromise of 1867, which enshrined the principles of constitutional monarchy. The agreement established the Dual Monarchy and gave the Hungarians sovereignty over their own affairs. The preservation of German cultural dominance throughout Cisleithania had proved to be difficult and now seemed to be was utterly impossible.

With the agreement, the desire for an autonomous Czech subdivision was mounting. Both German Bohemians and Czechs were hoping for a constitutional solution to the demands, but Czech nationalist views remained a constant part of the Bohemian political sphere. The Czechs had feared Germanization, but the Germans now worried about Czechization.

A symbol of the rising tensions was the fate of Charles University, then called Charles-Ferdinand University. Its Czech students had become increasingly perturbed by the sole use of German for instruction. During the 1848 revolution, both Germans and Czechs fought to make Czech one of the university's official languages. They achieved that right, and the university became bilingual. By 1863, out of 187 lecture courses, 22 were held in Czech, the remainder being in German. In 1864, some Germans suggested the creation of a separate Czech university. Czech professors rejected that because they did not wish to lose the continuity of university traditions.

The Czechs, however, were still not satisfied with bilingual status and proposed creating two separate constituent colleges, one for the Germans and one for the Czechs. The Germans vetoed the proposal and called for a full division of the university. After long negotiations, it was divided into the German Charles-Ferdinand University and the Czech Charles-Ferdinand University. The Cisleithanian Imperial Council prepared an act of parliament, and the emperor granted royal assent on 28 February 1882.

In 1907, the Cisleithanian Imperial Council was for the first time elected by universal male suffrage. As part of the process, new constituency boundaries had to be drawn throughout the empire. Electoral officials were very careful to demarcate areas as clearly either German or Czech and to assure that there would be no conflict as to which ethnicity had a majority in any constituency. Nevertheless, that did not settle tensions among Czechs, who wanted to govern themselves from Prague.

Archduke Franz Ferdinand came up with a plan, known as the United States of Greater Austria, in 1909. German Bohemia, as it was to be called, was going to be separated from the Czech areas around it in the plan. That would create ethnically homogenous self-governing provinces that would hopefully end the ethnic conflict. However, Franz Ferdinand was assassinated, and the First World War destroyed all hopes for a redrawn Cisleithania.

== Treaty of Saint-Germain-en-Laye ==
The end of the war in 1918 brought about the partition of the multiethnic Austria-Hungary into its historical components, one of them, the Bohemian Kingdom, forming the west of the newly created Czechoslovakia. Czech politicians insisted on the traditional boundaries of the Bohemian Crown according to the principle of uti possidetis juris. The new Czech state would thus have defensible mountain boundaries with Germany, but the highly industrialised settlement areas of three million Germans would now be separated from Austria and come under Czech control.

The Austrian head of government, Ernst Seidler von Feuchtenegg, wanted to divide Bohemia by setting up administrative counties (Verwaltungskreise), which would be based on the nationalities of the population. On 26 September 1918, his successor, Max Hussarek von Heinlein, offered the Czechs wide-ranging autonomy within Imperial and Royal Austria. Also, Austria was no longer considered to be a major power by the victors of the war.

=== Province of German Bohemia ===
On 14 October, Raphael Pacher succeeded, together with the social democrat, Josef Seliger, in uniting all German parties and members of parliament in Bohemia and Moravia into a coalition. In preparation for the foundation of the Republic of German Bohemia, the coalition, chaired by Pacher, appointed a committee of twelve members. One day after the proclamation of the Republic of Czechoslovakia, on 29 October 1918, the Province of German Bohemia was formed with its capital in Reichenberg. Its first governor was Raphael Pacher, who transferred his office on 5 November to Rudolf Lodgman von Auen.

The Province of German Bohemia comprised a contiguous region in North and West Bohemia stretching from the Egerland to the Braunau region along the border with the German Empire. In South Bohemia the administrative unit of Böhmerwaldgau emerged, which was to be part of Upper Austria. German Bohemia in the Eagle Mountains and in the area of Landskron merged with the so-called "Province of the Sudetenland", which had radically different borders than the later understanding of the term. The Bohemian district of Neubistritz was incorporated into Znaim and was supposed to be administered by Lower Austria. The judiciary for German Bohemia was based in Reichenberg, and Vienna was responsible for the other German regions. On 22 November 1918, the Province of German Bohemia proclaimed itself part of the state of German Austria. On the same day, the territory of German Austria was defined by the Act of the "Provisional National Assembly" (Provisorische Nationalversammlung), which included German Bohemian and German Moravian members of the former Cisleithanian Imperial Council.

In addition to the establishment of the state's governmental organisation, higher authorities were also created, such as the Finance Ministry, the Department of Agriculture and the Higher Regional Court of Reichenberg as well as a general post office and railway administration.

For geographical reasons, however, a territorial solution would have been impossible unless those regions, together with Austria, had been incorporated into Germany.

After the Czechoslovak Republic was proclaimed on 28 October 1918, the German Bohemians, claiming the right to self-determination according to the tenth of US President Woodrow Wilson's Fourteen Points, demanded that their homeland areas remain with Austria, which by then had been reduced to the Republic of German Austria. The German Bohemians relied mostly on peaceful opposition to the occupation of their homeland by the Czech military, which started on 31 October 1918 and was completed on 28 January 1919. Fighting took place sporadically, resulting in the deaths of a few dozen Germans and Czechs.

On 4 March 1919, almost the entire ethnic German population peacefully demonstrated for its right to self-determination. The demonstrations were accompanied by a one-day general strike. The German Social Democratic Workers Party in the Czechoslovak Republic, then the largest party, was responsible for the demonstration initiative, but it was also supported by other bourgeois German parties. The mass demonstrations were put down by the Czech military, involving 54 deaths and 84 wounded.

American diplomat Archibald Coolidge insisted on respecting the Germans' right to self-determination and uniting all German-speaking areas with either Germany or Austria, with the exception of northern Bohemia. However, the Treaty of Saint-Germain-en-Laye, on 10 September 1919, made it clear that German Bohemia would not become part of the new Austrian Republic. Instead, it would become part of Czechoslovakia. The new state regarded ethnic Germans as an ethnic minority. Nevertheless, some 90% lived in territories in which they represented 90% or more of the population.

=== Demography ===
In 1921, the population of multi-ethnic Czechoslovakia comprised 6.6 million Czechs, 3.2 million Germans, two million Slovaks, 0.7 million Hungarians, half a million Ruthenians (Rusyns), 300,000 Jews, and 100,000 Poles, as well as Gypsies, Croats and other ethnic groups. German-speakers represented a third of the population of the Bohemian lands and about 23.4% of the population of the whole republic (13.6 million). The Sudetenland possessed huge chemical works and lignite mines as well as textile, china, and glass factories. To the west, a triangle of historic ethnic German settlement surrounding Eger was the most active area for pan-German nationalism. The Upper Palatinate Forest, an area that was primarily populated by Germans, extended along the Bavarian frontier to the poor agricultural areas of southern Bohemia.

Moravia contained many patches of ethnic German settlement in the north and the south. Most typical in those areas were German "language islands", towns inhabited by German speakers but surrounded by rural Czechs. Extreme German nationalism was never prevalent in those areas. German nationalism in the coal-mining region of southern Silesia, which was 40.5% German, was restrained by fear of competition from industry in the Weimar Republic.

== Gradual general acceptance of Czechoslovak citizenship ==
Linguistic map of Czechoslovakia in 1930

Many Germans felt that the new constitution failed to fulfil what the Czechs had promised in the Treaty of Saint-Germain-en-Laye (1919) because there were too few minority rights. However, they gradually accepted remaining in Czechoslovakia and took part in the first elections in 1920. In 1926, the first Germans became minister (Robert Mayr-Harting and Franz Spina), and the first German political party became part of the government (German Christian Social People's Party and Farmers' League).

=== Politics ===
German nationalist sentiment ran high during the early years of the republic. On the other hand, in his very first message as Czechoslovak president, Tomáš Garrigue Masaryk had stressed that Bohemian Germans were to be seen as "emigrants" and "colonists". The new state hence started with marginalization of the Germans. However, Masaryk still tried to win the Germans for the new state by referring to economic advantages and by referring to their common Austrian past.

Sudeten representatives tried to join Austria or Germany or at least to obtain as much autonomy. The constitution of 1920 was drafted without Sudeten German representation, and Sudetens declined to participate in the election of the president. Sudeten political parties pursued an "obstructionist" (or negativist) policy in the Czechoslovak parliament. In 1926, however, German Chancellor Gustav Stresemann, adopting a policy of rapprochement with the West, advised the Sudeten Germans to co-operate actively with the Czechoslovak government. In consequence, most Sudeten German parties (including the German Agrarian Party, the German Social Democratic Party and the German Christian Socialist People's Party) changed their policy from negativism to activism, and several Sudeten politicians even accepted cabinet posts.

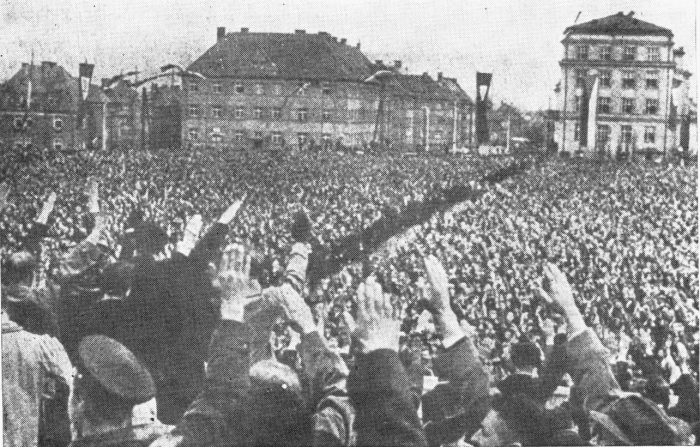
Sudetendeutsches Freikorps on 1 May 1938 in Liberec

At a party conference in Teplitz in 1919, the provincial Social Democratic Parties of Bohemia, Moravia and Sudeten-Silesia united to form the Deutsche Sozialdemokratische Arbeiterpartei (DSAP) and elected Josef Seliger as chairman. After Seliger's untimely death in 1920, Ludwig Czech became party chairman, who was succeeded in 1938 by Wenzel Jaksch.

Already in 1936, Jaksch, together with Hans Schütz of the German Christian Social People's Party (Deutsche Christlich-Soziale Volkspartei) and Gustav Hacker of the Farmers' Association (Bund der Landwirte), formed the Jungaktivisten (Young Activists). They sought agreement with the Czechoslovak government on a policy that could withstand the Nazi onslaught from within and from outside Czechoslovakia. At simultaneous mass rallies in Tetschen-Bodenbach/Děčín, Saaz/Žatec and Olešnice v Orlických horách/Gießhübl im Adlergebirge on April 26, 1936, they demanded equal opportunities in civil service for Germans, financial assistance for German businesses, official acceptance of the German language for public servants in the Sudetenland and measures to reduce unemployment in the Sudetenland. (At the time, one in three was unemployed in the Sudetenland, compared to one in five in the rest of the country.) Improving the quality of life of the Sudeten Germans was not the only motivation of the Jungaktivists. For Jaksch and his social democratic compatriots, it was a question of survival after a possible Nazi takeover. Of some 80,000 social democrats in Czechoslovakia, only about 5,000 would manage to flee the Nazis. The rest were incarcerated, and many of them were executed. Many of those who survived the Nazi persecution were later expelled, together with other Sudeten Germans, on the basis of Beneš decrees.

By 1929, only a small number of Sudeten German deputies, most of them members of the German National Party, supported by the propertied classes, and the German National Socialist Workers' Party, remained opposed to the Czechoslovak government. Nationalist sentiment flourished, however, among Sudeten German youths, who had a variety of organizations, such as the older Deutsche Turnverband and Schutzvereine, the Kameradschaftsbund, the Nazi Volkssport (1929) and the Bereitschaft.

== Rise of Nazis ==
Flag flown by some Sudeten Germans

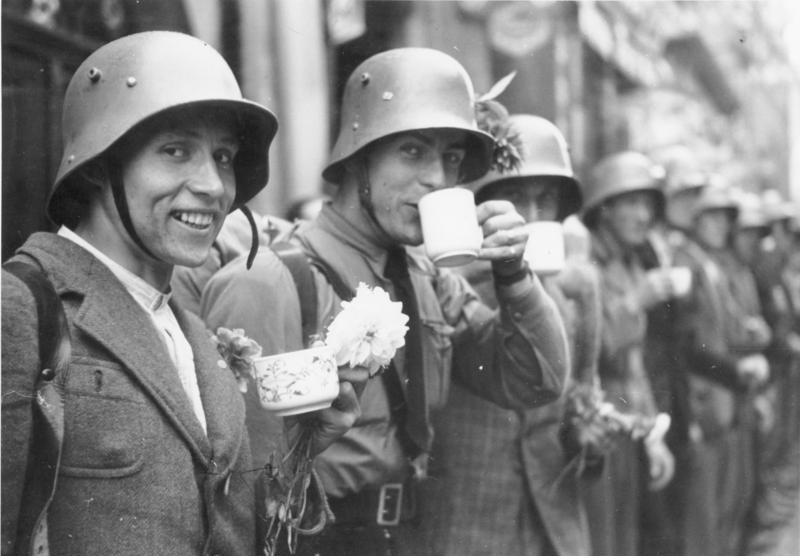
Sudeten German Freikorps

The Sudeten German nationalists, particularly the Nazis, expanded their activities after the Depression started. On 30 January 1933, Adolf Hitler was appointed chancellor of Germany. The Czechoslovak government prepared to suppress the Sudeten Nazi Party. In the autumn of 1933, the Sudeten Nazis dissolved their organization, and the German Nationals were pressured to do likewise. The government expelled German Nationals and Sudeten Nazis from local government positions. The Sudeten German population was indignant, especially in nationalist strongholds like Egerland.

On 1 October 1933, Konrad Henlein with his deputy, Karl Hermann Frank, aided by other members of the Kameradschaftsbund, a youth organization of mystical orientation, created a new political organisation. The Sudeten German Home Front (Sudetendeutsche Heimatfront) professed loyalty to Czechoslovakia but championed decentralization. It absorbed most former German Nationals and Sudeten Nazis. The Kameradschaftsbund under Henlein did not promote joining Germany, but campaigned for decentralised Czechoslovakia based on the model of Switzerland; Henlein promoted a separate Sudeten German identity, using the term sudetendeutscher Stamm (Sudeten German tribe). Before 1937, Henlein was critical of Adolf Hitler and advocated for the ideas of liberalism and individualism. However, Henlein's movement was growing increasingly divided and his own position soon became precarious. Henlein suffered a severe blow to his reputation as well as political influence when his mentor, Heinz Rutha, was accused of homosexuality and committed suicide in prison. The radical wing of the party pressured Henlein to resign, and the Czechoslovak security forces increased their efforts to frustrate the movement's activities. Ronald Smelser noted that "backed to the wall, Henlein took what he thought to be the only step left to rescue his own position and the unity of his movement: he wrote a letter to Adolf Hitler." Henlein started secretly cooperating with the German government and the underground Nazi movement.

In 1935, the Sudeten German Home Front became the Sudeten German Party (Sudetendeutsche Partei) (SdP) and embarked on an active propaganda campaign. In the May election, the SdP won more than 60% of the Sudeten German vote. The German Agrarians, Christian Socialists and Social Democrats each lost approximately half of their followers. The SdP became the centre of German nationalist forces. The party represented itself as striving for a just settlement of Sudeten German claims within the framework of Czechoslovak democracy. Henlein, however, maintained secret contact with Nazi Germany and received material aid from Berlin, which told him to refuse every concession offered by Czechoslovakia. The SdP endorsed the idea of a Führer and mimicked Nazi methods with banners, slogans and uniformed troops. Concessions offered by the Czechoslovak government, including the installation of exclusively Sudeten German officials in Sudeten German areas and the possible participation of the SdP in the cabinet, were rejected. Nevertheless, the party campaigned on autonomy for the Sudetenland and pledged allegiance to the Czechoslovak stance; a majority of SdP voters supported regional autonomy and did not desire to join the German state. Elizabeth Wiskemann remarked that "when Henlein repeated to his English friends in London as late as May 1938 that he still wished for autonomy within the Czechoslovak State, whether he was speaking sincerely or not, he was expressing the wishes of a very considerable proportion of his followers". According to Ralf Gebel, "the majority had voted for a party that united the Sudeten Germans and aimed to improve their position within the Czechoslovak Republic — no more and no less". Johann Wolfgang Brügel also highlights that although Henlein became "Hitler's paladin", the SdP of 1935 represented a "conglomerate of practically all [political] colourings", and the opinion of the general Sudeten German population only supported autonomy within Czechoslovakia.

On 13 March 1938, the Third Reich annexed Austria during the Anschluss. Sudeten Germans reacted with fear to the news of Austrian annexation, and the moderate wing of SdP grew in strength. Hitherto pro-Henlein German newspaper Bohemia (newspaper) denounced the SdP leader, arguing that his call for Sudeten Anschluss goes against the wish of his voters and supporters: "His present call to irredentism saddles the Sudeten Germans with all the consequences of treason to the State; for such a challenge the electors gave him neither their votes nor their mandate". On 22 March, the German Agrarian Party, led by Gustav Hacker, merged with the SdP. German Christian Socialists in Czechoslovakia suspended their activities on 24 March; their deputies and senators entered the SdP parliamentary club. However, the majority of Sudeten Germans did not support annexation into Germany. Contemporary reports of The Times found that there was a "large number of Sudetenlanders who actively opposed annexation", and that the pro-German policy was challenged by the moderates within the SdP as well; according to Wickham Steed, over 50% of Henleinists favoured greater autonomy within Czechoslovakia over joining Germany. P. E. Caquet argues that in case of a fair plebiscite, a majority of the Sudetenland population would have voted to remain in Czechoslovakia. The municipal elections of May 1938 were marred with voter intimidation and street fighting - officially the SdP won about 90% of the Sudeten vote, but about a third of Sudeten Germans were prevented from casting a free vote.

=== Czechoslovak Chamber of Deputies (1920–1935) ===
The table below shows the number of seats German parties and German–Hungarian lists gained in the Czechoslovak Chamber of Deputies between 1920 and 1935.

| Party or List | Seats 1920 | Seats 1925 | Seats 1929 | Seats 1935 | Votes 1935 |
|---|---|---|---|---|---|
| Sudeten German Party | – | – | – | 44 | 1.256.010 |
| German National Party | – | 10 | 7 | – | – |
| German National Socialist Workers Party | 15 | 17 | 8 | – | – |
| German Social Democratic Workers Party | 31 | 17 | 21 | 11 | 300.406 |
| German Christian Social People's Party | 7 | 13 | 14 | 6 | 163.666 |
| German Union of Farmers | 11 | 24 | – | 5 | 142.775 |
| Hungarian Parties and Sudeten German Electoral Bloc | 9 | 4 | 9 | 9 | 292.847 |
| United German Parties | 6 | – | 16 | – | – |
| Total (out of 300 seats) | 79 | 85 | 75 | 75 | |

- Hungarian Parties and Sudeten German Electoral Bloc (1935): German Democratic Liberal Party, German Industrialist Party, Party of German Nation, Sudeten German Land Union, German Workers Party, Zips German Party, Provincial Christian Social Party, Hungarian National Party

== Munich Agreements ==
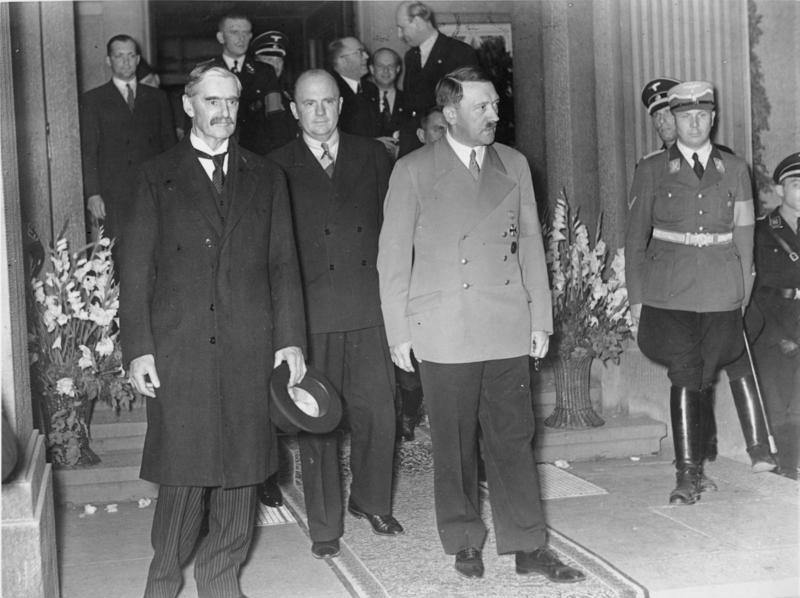
Neville Chamberlain (left) and Adolf Hitler leave the Bad Godesberg meeting on 23 September 1938.

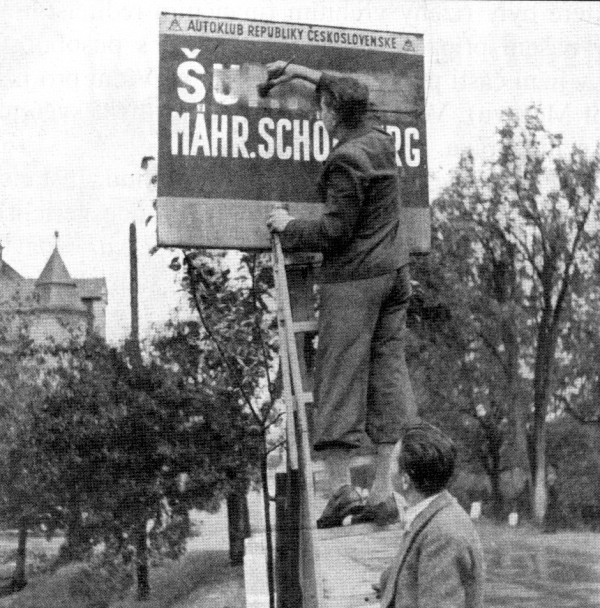
In Šumperk-Mährisch Schönberg, Czech names were erased by the Sudeten Germans after the German annexation of Sudetenland in 1938.

Konrad Henlein met with Hitler in Berlin on 28 March 1938 and was told to raise demands that would be unacceptable to the Czechoslovak government. In the Carlsbad Decrees, issued on 24 April at the Carlsbad convention, the SdP demanded complete autonomy for the Sudetenland and freedom to profess Nazi ideology. If Henlein's demands had been granted, the Sudetenland would have been in a position to align itself with Nazi Germany.

As the political situation worsened, the security in Sudetenland deteriorated. The region became the site of small-scale clashes between young SdP followers, equipped with arms smuggled from Germany, and police and border forces. In some places, the regular army was called in to pacify the situation. Nazi propaganda accused the Czech government and Czechs of atrocities on innocent Germans. The Czechoslovak public started to prepare for an inevitable war, such as by training with gas masks.

On 20 May, Czechoslovakia initiated a so-called "partial mobilization" (literally "special military precaution") in response to rumours of German troop movements. The army moved into position on the border. Western powers tried to calm down the situation and forced Czechoslovakia to comply with most of the Carlsbad Decrees. However the SdP, instructed to continue to push towards war, escalated the situation with more protests and violence.

With the help of special Nazi forces, the Sudetendeutsche Freikorps (paramilitary groups trained in Germany by SS-instructors) took over some border areas and committed many crimes: they killed more than 110 Czechoslovaks (mostly soldiers and policemen) and kidnapped over 2,020 Czechoslovak citizens (including German antifascists), taking them to Nazi Germany.

In August, British Prime Minister Neville Chamberlain sent Lord Runciman, a faithful appeaser, to Czechoslovakia to see if he could obtain a settlement between the Czechoslovak government and the Sudeten Germans. His mission failed because Henlein refused all conciliating proposals under secret orders by Hitler.

The Runciman Report to the British government stated this on Czechoslovakia's policy towards the German minority during the preceding decades:

Czech officials and Czech police, speaking little or no German, were appointed in large numbers to purely German districts; Czech agricultural colonists were encouraged to settle on land confiscated under the Land Reform in the middle of German populations; for the children of these Czech invaders Czech schools were built on a large scale; there is a very general belief that Czech firms were favoured as against German firms in the allocation of State contracts and that the State provided work and relief for Czechs more readily than for Germans. I believe these complaints to be in the main justified. Even as late as the time of my Mission, I could find no readiness on the part of the Czechoslovak Government to remedy them on anything like an adequate scale... the feeling among the Sudeten Germans until about three or four years ago was one of hopelessness. But the rise of Nazi Germany gave them new hope. I regard their turning for help towards their kinsmen and their eventual desire to join the Reich as a natural development in the circumstances.

Britain and France then pressured the Czechoslovak government into ceding the Sudetenland to Germany on 21 September. The Munich Agreement, signed September 29 by Britain, France, Germany and Italy and negotiated without Czechoslovak participation, only confirmed that decision and the negotiated details. Czechoslovakia ceded a German-defined maximalist extension of Sudetenland to Germany, including the Škoda Works; near Pilsen, they had been Czechoslovakia's primary armaments factory.

As a result, Bohemia and Moravia lost about 38% of their combined area, and 3.65 million inhabitants (2.82 million Germans and approximately 513,000 – 750,000 Czechs to Germany).

== Under Nazi rule ==
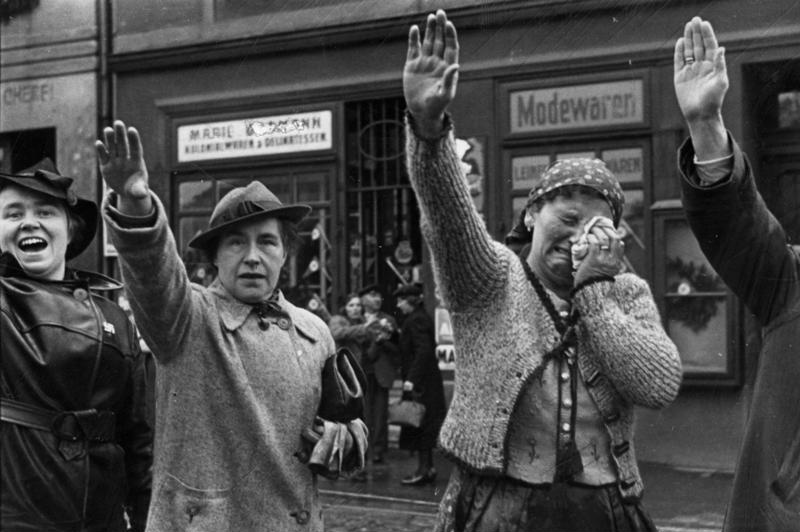
Sudeten Germans greeting Hitler with the Nazi salute after he crossed the border into Czechoslovakia in 1938

Some 250,000 Germans remained on the Czech side of the border, which later became part of the Reich by the establishment of the Protectorate of Bohemia and Moravia under German governors and the German Army. Almost all the Germans in these Czech territories were subsequently granted German citizenship, while most of the Germans in Slovakia obtained citizenship of the Slovak state.

With the establishment of German rule, hundreds of thousands of Czechs who (under the policy of Czechification) had moved into the Sudetenland after 1919 left the area, some willingly. They were, however, permitted to take away their possessions and to legally sell their houses and land. A few, however, remained.

In elections held on 4 December 1938, 97.32% of the adult population in Sudetenland voted for the NSDAP (most of the rest were Czechs who were allowed to vote as well). About half a million Sudeten Germans joined the Nazi Party, which amounted to 17.34% of the German population in the Sudetenland (the average in Nazi Germany was 7.85%). Because of their knowledge of the Czech language, many Sudeten Germans were employed in the administration of the Protectorate of Bohemia and Moravia as well as in the Nazi oppressive machinery such as the Gestapo. The most notable was Karl Hermann Frank, the SS and Police general and Secretary of State in the Protectorate.

After the establishment of the Protectorate of Bohemia and Moravia, almost all Bohemian and Moravian Jews, many of whom were primarily German-speaking, were deported and murdered by the authorities. The Nazis evacuated about 120,000 Germans (mostly women and children) to the Sudetenland and the Protectorate.

== Expulsion and transfer ==
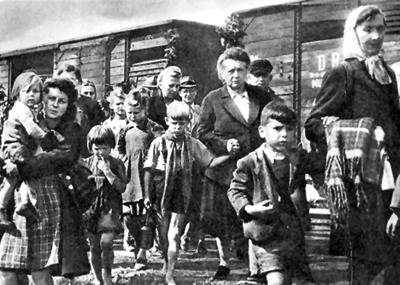
Germans expelled from Bohemia and Moravia after the Second World War

In the aftermath of World War II, when the Czechoslovak state was restored, the government expelled the majority of ethnic Germans (about 3 million altogether), in the belief that their behaviour had been a major cause of the war and subsequent destruction. In the months directly following the end of the war, "wild" expulsions happened from May until August 1945. Several Czechoslovak statesmen encouraged such expulsions with polemical speeches. Generally local authorities ordered the expulsions, which armed volunteers carried out. In some cases the regular army initiated or assisted such expulsions. Several thousand Germans were murdered during the expulsion, and many more died from hunger and illness as a consequence of becoming refugees.

The regular transfer of ethnic nationals among nations, authorized according to the Potsdam Conference, proceeded from 25 January 1946 until October 1946. An estimated 1.6 million "ethnic Germans" (most of them also had Czech ancestors; and even Czechs, who spoke mainly German over the last years), were deported from Czechoslovakia to the American zone of what would become West Germany. An estimated 800,000 were deported to the Soviet zone (in what would become East Germany). Estimates of casualties related to this expulsion range between 20,000 and 200,000 people, depending on source. Casualties included primarily violent deaths and suicides, rapes, deaths in internment camps and natural causes.

Even the German-speaking Charles-Ferdinand University in Prague could not escape expulsion. The remaining faculty, students, and administrators fled to Munich in Bavaria, where they established the Collegium Carolinum, a research institute for the study of the Bohemian lands.

The Sudetendeutsche Landsmannschaft claims to represent the German refugees from the former Czechoslovak Republic, but its conservative positions were and are discussed very controversially among the refugees themselves, with many choosing not to associate with the organization. In the 2001 census, 39,106 people in the Czech Republic claimed German ethnicity. In theory, with the accession of the Czech Republic into the European Union, refugee Sudeten Germans and their descendants (or for that matter, also Germans with no previous link to the Bohemian lands) could have moved back there without needing the Czech government's permission – but in practice such a move did not materialize in any significant numbers, as they could not reclaim property and many were well established in Germany.

In February 2025, the Czech government announced a multi-million crown subsidy from the Ministry of Regional Development to support the maintenance of abandoned Sudeten German graves. Following World War II, the expulsion of over three million Germans from Czechoslovakia led to the neglect of numerous German cemeteries. Many municipalities, like Radonice, have struggled to preserve these sites due to limited resources. Historian Martin Krsek emphasizes that these graves hold significant historical and artistic value, serving as chronicles of past communities. The new funding aims to assist local authorities in preserving this neglected part of the nation's heritage.

== In other countries ==
=== Argentina ===
Although to a lesser extent than the Volga Germans, Sudeten Germans also immigrated to Argentina. Some groups settled in different German colonies in the Misiones Province.

Particularly notable is the case of the German businessman Oskar Schindler and his wife Emilie Schindler, who lived in Argentina for a few years.

Likewise, Argentina-based Princess Mercedes von Dietrichstein, daughter of Alexander von Dietrichstein, has spent long years legally battling to recover her family's assets (for example, Mikulov Castle) that were confiscated from them in the Sudetenland area by order of the President of Czechoslovakia Edvard Beneš, through the so-called Beneš Decrees, which dispossessed all ethnic Germans of their property and expelled them from their land.

=== Chile ===
In 1877, a group of Sudeten Germans from the city of Braunau (historical region of Bohemia, then located in the Austro-Hungarian Empire; current city of Broumov, Czech Republic) founded the town of Nueva Braunau in Chile, in Los Lagos Region. Likewise, in the town of Colonia Humán (currently integrated as a neighborhood into the city of Los Ángeles), in the Biobío Region, some Germans from the Sudetenland joined other groups of established Germans.

In the 1930s, the Chilean businesswoman Antonia Inalaf decided to finance a project to emigrate Sudeten Germans to Chile. This group of Germans came from the city of Rossbach (currently Hranice, in the historical region of Moravia, Czech Republic), and in 1935 she founded the town of Puyuhuapi, in the Aysén Region. Although her project was to settle many more families, the Second World War frustrated her plans. Therefore, some relatives of those who had already settled were only able to arrive in 1947. First, the settlers settled with their families, which gave rise to a new population.

Following the expulsion of Germans from Czechoslovakia at the end of World War II, a new group of Sudeten Germans immigrated to Chile, either to settle in Puyuhuapi or in other German colonies in the south of the country.

=== Spain ===
Before World War II broke out, Prince Maximilian Eugene of Hohenlohe-Langenburg decided to take refuge in Spain. Similarly, after the war, all of his assets were confiscated through the Beneš Decrees. However, the fortune of his wife's family prevented him from falling out of favor. In Spain, one of his sons, Prince Alfonso, founded the Marbella Club Hotel, thus beginning the Marbella Golden Mile, which he catapulted as a destination for international luxury tourism, which since then has generated great wealth for Spain.

=== Paraguay ===
On October 1, 1933, some families of Sudeten Germans founded the "Colonia Sudetia" in the Paso Yobai district, Guairá Department. In the beginning the colony was difficult for them, since most of them were not farmers but had other professions, but they soon knew how to adapt and today the community is the seat of large yerba mate factories.

== Languages ==
German was spoken in various East Central and Austro-Bavarian dialects. The Sudeten German area of settlement lay mostly along the border areas of Czechoslovakia and so the dialects mostly resembled those of German dialects beyond those borders. Thus, there were East Central German dialects in northern Bohemia and Moravia, but Austro-Bavarian ones in western and southern Bohemia as well as southern Moravia. Furthermore, the Austrian variety of standard German and the Austro-Bavarian dialect of its capital Vienna exerted a superstrate influence at least until the end of World War I.

Various Sudeten German dialects are currently practically extinct as most Germans were expelled from Czechoslovakia: present Sudeten Germans speak mainly Czech and/or Standard German.

== See also ==
- Occupation of Czechoslovakia (1938–1945)
- Beneš decrees
- Sudeten German Homeland Association
- History of Czechoslovakia (1918–1938)
- Ethnic minorities in Czechoslovakia
