= Heinz Rutha =

Heinz Rutha (born Heinrich Rutha; 20 April 1897 – 4 November 1937) was a Sudeten German interior decorator and politician for the Sudeten German Party. He died by suicide in prison after having been publicly accused of homosexual practices and the "corruption of youth".

== Early life ==
Rutha was born on 20 April 1897 in Lázně Kundratice (German: Bad Kunnersdorf), Bohemia, Austria-Hungary (today part of Osečná in the Czech Republic). A prominent landscape feature where he was growing up was the Devil's Wall (Czech: Čertova zeď), a huge outcrop of volcanic black rock that resembles a wall reaching more than thirty feet high and running over 20 miles. According to local legend, it was built by the Devil to keep the quarreling ethnic Germans and Czechs of Bohemia apart after a German farmer sold his soul in exchange for the wall being built. The devil features in a disproportionate number of Bohemian folk tales, both German and Czech. For some, the Devil's Wall became a symbol of the German-Czech dispute as the people living north of the wall tended to speak German while the people living south of the wall tended to speak Czech.

Rutha was born in and grew up in Sudetenland region of Bohemia, whose politics was dominated by a conflict between the nationalism of the Czech majority who challenged the dominant position of the German minority. In turn, the völkisch ideology which from the 1880s interpreted Germanness in racial terms was very popular with the ethnic Germans of Bohemia as it was used to justify their traditionally dominant position. The same year that Rutha was born, 1897, had seen widespread rioting by the German minority in protest against a law passed by the Austrian Reichsrat declaring that henceforward Bohemia was to be bilingual with Czech having the same status as German.

Rutha grew up in this atmosphere of German-Czech conflict, and as an ethnic German saw his role in promoting the German language and culture in Bohemia. Rutha's father, like other ethnic Germans in Bohemia, had völkisch inclinations, and Rutha was later to praise the Devil's Wall as a barrier that protected the Germans of the Sudetenland from the Czech "Slavic flood" that threatened to wash them away. Rutha's mother, whom he idealized, was of Czech descent; at her insistence he learnt some Czech and at age 11 was sent to the town of Mnichovo Hradiště south of the Devil's Wall to improve his Czech. Rutha was later to write that his time in Mnichovo Hradiště was the worse time of his life as he felt out of place with the Czechs who were to him a "foreign" people.

A charismatic man with a romantic streak, Rutha joined the Wandervogel ("Wandering Birds")-an early German-nationalist youth movement- group shortly before the First World War, which became his passion. Bohemia was the scene of a heated conflict between the German minority versus the Czech majority, and as an ethnic German in north Bohemia, Rutha had embraced his Wandervogel group assuming a strongly nationalistic outlook. A major part of the message of Rutha's Wandervogel, which went out on Wanderungen (expeditions) to the countryside was that only Germans could properly appreciate the beauty of the countryside and mountains of the Sudetenland, which was a way of asserting a sort of claim on ownership on Bohemia.

== World War I ==
In the First World War Rutha enlisted in the Austrian Army, and fought on the Italian front. On 1 April 1918, Rutha wrote in his diary of feeling very attracted to a "tall blond lad" from Prague, whose address he was able to obtain, and whom he called when arrived in Prague a few days later. On 8 April 1918, Rutha took his oath of loyalty to the Emperor Karl I, writing with disgust that most of the other men in his unit had little enthusiasm for the Austrian Empire, the emperor or the war, which he blamed on the fact that they were all "Czechs, Jews and shallow Germans". Despite his ardent support for the war, even Rutha complained in his diary about the "corruption and cowardice" of the Austrian Army, observing that most officers were more interested in getting rich via corruption than in the lives of their men. Much to his own shock, Rutha discovered that the officers of the Imperial Austrian and Royal Hungarian Army did not care about the lives of their men, and after being verbally and physically abused by a Hungarian officer who had slapped him across the face, Rutha wrote in his diary: "For a long time, I myself have believed that the free man of the twentieth century is just a number, but I have never had it expressed so bluntly."

Rutha saw war as the ultimate test of masculinity, and was often nostalgic after the war for the intense sense of male camaraderie he experienced while fighting the Italians up in the Alps in 1918. For Rutha, his experience of the war confirmed to the value of the male bonding promoted by the Wandervogel movement, of the necessity of charismatic leadership to hold a group of men together and of the völkisch concept of all life as a struggle to survive. At one moment, when Rutha found himself face to face with a trench full of corpses, he felt that he passed through the fire of the "apocalypse" and had been "reborn". In 1918, Rutha recorded in his diary a struggle over his sexuality, attempting to deny his homosexuality, calling such feelings "unnatural" while admitting to his obsessive love for his "blood brothers". One of his "blood brothers" from the Wandervogel was a Hans Martin, whom Rutha called his "dearest lad" who was killed in action in 1918. Another "blood brother" was a man identified only as Förster, whom Rutha had last seen in 1916, but whose memory was cherished by him.

Rutha wrote an imaginary letter to Förster in his diary of their "devoted moments, your hand held in mine as we sit and talk in the quiet twilight...For I am a piece of yourself: our experience, our feelings, our striving upwards will lie naked before us". Later, Rutha wrote in his imaginary letter to Förster: "Common, impure men who in their filth see nothing as pure, would perhaps-not certainly-class my feelings for you as unnatural". During a period of leave in August 1918, Rutha attended a wandervogel festival in the Sudeten mountains, which he met a teenager named Ernst Juppe, whose "wonderfully developed body" caused him to be constantly sexually aroused. While taking a walk in the mountains while locking arms, Juppe told Rutha that he had given up masturbation, and as a result no longer had feelings for men while Rutha told him about his struggle over sexuality.

On 16 October 1918, Rutha was promoted to corporal. Rutha later wrote on that night, he went walking through the trenches on a night without stars, knowing that in front of him was "uncertain emptiness" and behind him the "chaos of a gigantic collapse". In late October 1918, the Italians started a new offensive which caused the collapse of the Austro-Hungarian Army, which simply disintegrated with men abandoning their posts to head home. In 1919, Rutha returned home to the Sudetenland, which together with the rest of Bohemia was now part of the new First Czechoslovak Republic, a state that Rutha was very hostile towards.

== Political career ==
Active in the Wandervogel, Rutha came to envision his own ideas of a "Männerbund," influenced in part by the rise of national self-awareness on the part of the Sudeten Germans after the collapse of Austria-Hungary. Opposed to Czechoslovakia, Rutha believed that the solution to the problems facing the Sudeten German community was a Männerbund, an elite group of "heroic" men who united by charismatic leadership and intense male bonding would provide the necessary leadership to "save" the Sudeten Germans. In 1921, inspired by the "male bonding" notions of the homosexual German poet Stefan George, he created the Jungenschaft, his own section within the Wandervogel. Like George, Rutha saw ancient Greece as a model to emulate, noting that the ancient Greeks had idealized male bonding and beauty. George had promoted the notion of "Hellenic Germans", namely a group of romantic, handsome young men who would be the "heroic" elite, a concept that Rutha embraced. Rutha always denied his sexuality in public, and he never embraced the politics of the early German homosexual rights campaigner Adolf Brand, but much of Rutha's style was inspired by Brand. To counter the popular stereotype of homosexuals as weak and effeminate, Brand had promoted a "hard", macho image for himself and his followers. Like Brand, Rutha glorified ancient Greece, male bonding, and the male body; embraced eroticism as a sort of life force that could be channeled; and promoted a "hard" macho style with his followers encouraged to engage in physical fitness and to be tough.

The Wandervogel group that Rutha led on various camping trips out to the Sudeten mountains and forests where they read poetry, sang German folk and nationalist songs, admired the beauty of nature, and cultivated male bonding was entirely male as Rutha refused to accept women as members. Rutha in public denied that he was homosexual, but contemporaries noted that the open homoeroticism of Rutha's wandervogel group that fetishized the beauty of the male body. Despite Rutha's vehement denials, evidence that came out in 1937 does suggest that sex occurred during the camping trips in the wildness of the Sudeten mountains.

Greatly influenced by the theories of the conservative Catholic Austrian philosopher Othmar Spann and by his own reading of Plato's book The Republic, Rutha envisioned a German-dominated society emerging in Bohemia that would be organized hierarchically along corporatist lines. Rutha saw his Männerbund as playing the same role in this proposed new society that Plato had envisioned for his elite in The Republic.

In 1926, Rutha and his group left the Wandervogel and joined the Sudeten Turnverbund (Gymnastics League), where Konrad Henlein was one of his disciples. Rutha was also active in the elitist and covert Kameradschaftsbund organization. Later he joined the Sudeten German Party (SdP), as did many other members of the Kameradschaftsbund. Rutha wanted the Sudetenland to become autonomous in Czechoslovakia and was opposed to the Grossdeutschland group led by Karl Hermann Frank who wanted the Sudetenland to join Germany. In 1935 Henlein appointed Rutha as his 'foreign minister', as an ambassador sent abroad to persuade the West of the justice of the Sudeten German cause. As such, Rutha visited Geneva several times to negotiate at the League of Nations; and also took part in League of Nations Union Congresses in Brussels (1935), Glasgow (1936) and Bratislava (1937). His talks in London, 1935–37, did much to persuade the British government of Sudeten German 'moderation' and Czech 'obstinacy', paving the way for the British perspective towards Czechoslovakia in 1938.

== Arrest ==
In late 1937, however, the Czechoslovak media published stories charging Rutha with homosexual practices, based on police interrogations of young men employed at Rutha's furniture manufacturing plant. The scandal began in August 1937 when the police in Reichenberg arrested a young man named Wilhelm Purm who was a SdP member and was believed to working as a low-level spy for Germany. Purm denied being a spy, and also blurted out that he was not a homosexual, which struck the police as unusual since that allegation was not part of their investigation. Intrigued, the police pressed Purm on why they might think he was homosexual, which led him to mention that many men in the SdP were and that Rutha was an "ein warmer Bruder" ("a warm brother"-German slang). On the basis of this the police opened an investigation into Rutha. Rutha lived in the village of Kundratice where he ran a furniture business out of a former mill, and employed dozens of men. The police interviewed one former apprentice from Rutha's workshop, Franz Veitenhensel, who wrote that when he was 15 years old in 1935 and working as an apprentice at the shop, Rutha would invite him to his home above his shop, where: "First, he gave me something to eat, then he read to me (chiefly Stefan George and Hölderlin) and finally it came to mutual gratification: namely he played with my genitals until I ejaculated, or he took my penis into his mouth and sucked on it until the semen came out, which-as far I could tell-he swallowed".

Based on this and other statements, the police arrested dozens of other young men who were active in Rutha's youth group, who told similar stories. Another man active in Rutha Wandervogel group, the 20 year-old Werner Weiss, told the police that Rutha often persuaded him to spend the night in his house, during which time the two had kissed and engaged in mutual masturbation. Weiss told the police that Rutha would come into his bed and: "After a short conversation, he persuaded me to let him take my sexual organ in his hand and in this way he produced an ejaculation. At his request, I did the same for him." On 6 October 1937, Rutha was arrested in his SdP office in Prague on charges of violating paragraph 129b of the Czechoslovak legal code, which was a carry-over from an Austrian law passed in 1852 which made it illegal for "any act where sexual gratification is sought or found on the body of the same sex". After his arrest, the police opened the safe in Rutha's office containing his will, which he had written in 1930. In his will, Rutha had asked: "My coffin should be borne by six of our best and most beautiful young men. Leave me alone with them for a hour or a night, before I have to go. If I am still among them, then I will know that I am still alive even if my body is dead."

Under questioning, Rutha admitted that he was very close to the teenage boys who were following him; buying them presents for their birthdays; taking them on trips to museums and art galleries to teach them about German and ancient Greek art; on inviting them to his home to teach philosophy and literature; but vehemently denied having any sort of erotic relationships with his followers. Tellingly, Rutha told the police: "I don't regard myself as a homosexual and I have never had homosexual intercourse."

Rutha never came to trial, for he hanged himself in a prison in Česká Lípa on 4 November 1937. A Helleneophile to the end, Rutha in his suicide note compared himself to Socrates who had killed himself after being found guilty of corrupting the youth of Athens. Twelve other young men connected to Rutha were still brought to trial by the Czech authorities, of whom ten were convicted and several sentenced to jail terms. Many other investigations of the Youth Movement were started (most notably scrutinizing the sexual activities of Walter Brand). The direct political aftermath was that Konrad Henlein, as leader of the SdP, had to start making political concessions to the National Socialist wing of the party. In the following years, especially after the Nazi invasion of Czechoslovakia, the National Socialists invoked the charges against Rutha as a handy tool to ostracize and expel many Sudeten separatists from the SdP. This shifted the balance of power in favor of those who favored Anschluss with Germany.
