= Konrad Henlein =

Sudeten German politician, Gauleiter, SS-Obergruppenführer (1898–1945)

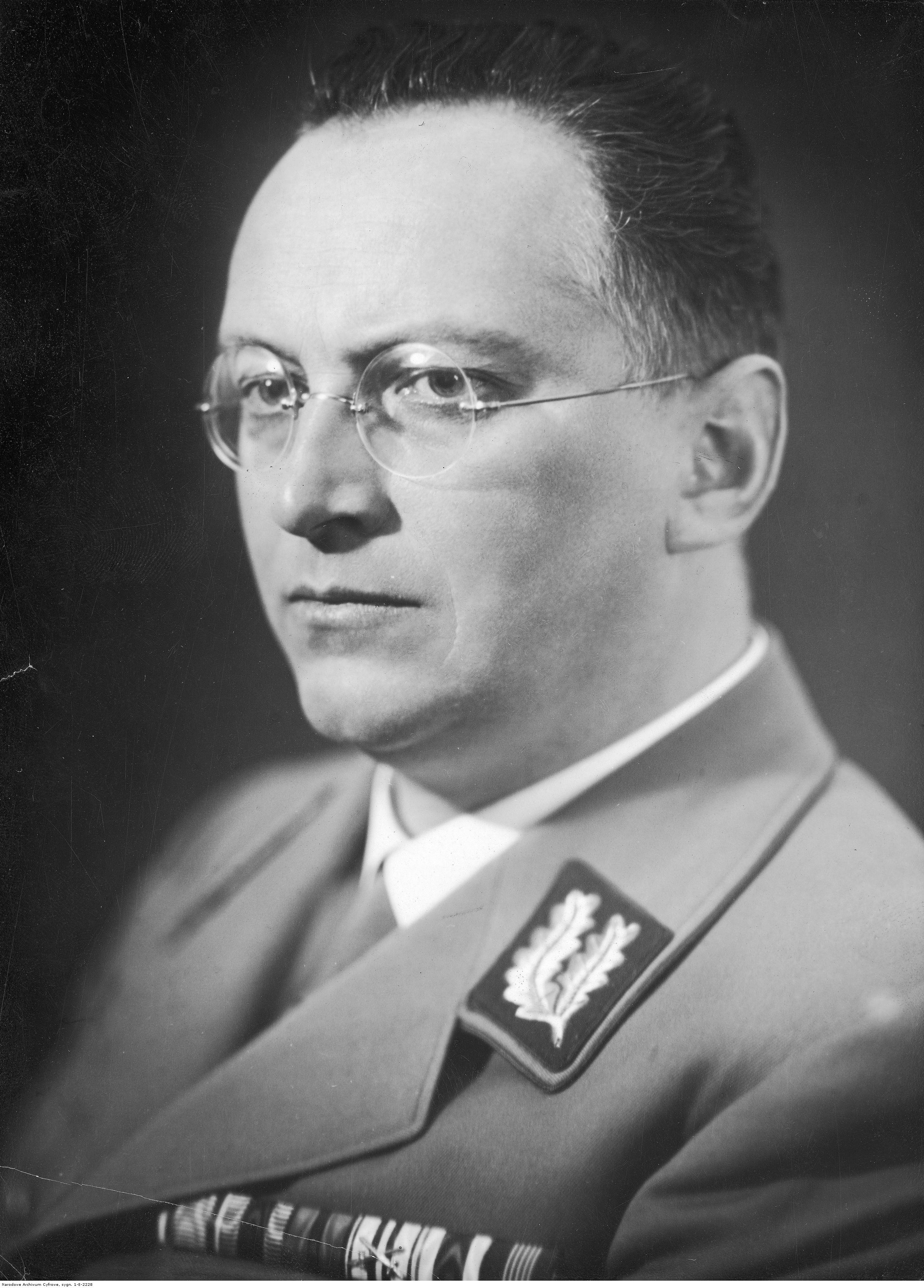
- Henlein in 1938

Gauleiter of Reichsgau Sudetenland
- In office 1 October 1938 – 8 May 1945
- Preceded by: Position created
- Succeeded by: Position abolished

Reichsstatthalter of Reichsgau Sudetenland
- In office 1 May 1939 – 8 May 1945
- Preceded by: Position created
- Succeeded by: Position abolished

Commander of Sudetendeutsches Freikorps
- In office May 1938 – September 1938
- Preceded by: Position created
- Succeeded by: Position abolished

Leader of the Sudeten German Party of Czechoslovakia
- In office 1 October 1933 – 5 November 1938
- Preceded by: Position created
- Succeeded by: Position abolished

Personal details
- Born: 6 May 1898 Maffersdorf, Bohemia, Austria-Hungary
- Died: 10 May 1945 (aged 47) Plzeň, Czechoslovakia
- Party: NSDAP (1939–1945)
- Other political affiliations: SdP (1933–1938)
- Profession: Bank teller

Military service
- Allegiance: Austria-Hungary; Nazi Germany
- Branch/service: Austro-Hungarian Army; Sudetendeutsches Freikorps; Schutzstaffel
- Rank: Kriegsfreiwilliger; SS-Obergruppenführer
- Unit: Tiroler Kaiser-Jäger-Regiment Nr. 3 Infanterie-Regiment Nr. 27
- Battles/wars: World War I: Italian Front (POW)

Konrad Ernst Eduard Henlein (6 May 1898 – 10 May 1945) was a Sudeten German politician in Czechoslovakia, before World War II. After Nazi Germany invaded and occupied Czechoslovakia, he became the Gauleiter and Reichsstatthalter of Reichsgau Sudetenland.

Born in the Austro-Hungarian Empire in 1898, Henlein served in the Austro-Hungarian Army in World War I. The Austrian Empire collapsed after that, and the Sudetenland, where Henlein lived, became part of newly created Czechoslovakia.

He became active in the Deutscher Turnverband movement, a German nationalist and Völkisch athletic organization. In 1933, after the Machtergreifung of Hitler and his regime, he founded the Sudeten German Party of Czechoslovakia. It merged into the Nazi Party in 1939.

Henlein actively lobbied for Germany to annex the Sudetenland and led the Sudetendeutsches Freikorps in the Sudeten German uprising in September 1938 that led to the Munich Agreement and the German occupation of the Sudetenland. After the occupation in October 1938, he formally joined the Nazi Party and the Schutzstaffel (SS) and was appointed Gauleiter of Reichsgau Sudetenland. He became Reichsstatthalter of Reichsgau Sudetenland when it was formed on 1 May 1939, and was responsible for mass deportations to extermination camps. He died on 10 May 1945 in American custody by suicide.

== Early life ==
Henlein was born in Maffersdorf in Bohemia, Austria-Hungary (now Vratislavice nad Nisou, part of Liberec in the Czech Republic). His father, Konrad Henlein Sr., worked as an accounts clerk. His mother, Hedvika Anna Augusta Dworatschek (Dvořáčková), came from a Czech family of German Bohemian origin.

Henlein attended business school in Gablonz (Jablonec nad Nisou) and in World War I entered the Austro-Hungarian Army as a military volunteer (Kriegsfreiwilliger), assigned to the k.u.k. Tiroler Kaiser-Jäger-Regiment # 3. In May 1916 he attended officer candidate school, then was assigned to k.u.k. Infanterie-Regiment Nr. 27, based in Graz. He saw Italian Front service in the Dolomites at Monte Forno, Mont Sief, and Monte Maletta between May 1916 and 17 November 1917.

He was severely wounded, then captured by Italian soldiers, and spent the rest of the war as a POW on Asinara Island, where he studied the history of the German Turner (gymnastics) movement of Friedrich Ludwig Jahn. His experiences as a Frontkämpfer (front-line fighter), gassed on the Italian front played an important role in shaping his politics. His self-image as a fighter for the Sudeten community was crucial to his subsequent career.

== Völkisch gymnastics leader ==
Henlein embraced the Völkisch movement and joined the Deutscher Turnverband (gymnastics association). By 1923, he was promoting völkisch ideology in his local turner club. Henlein became an increasingly well known figure in the Sudetenland after club wins in a 1926 gymnastics competition in Prague. Henlein's mentor Heinz Rutha, founder of the Turnerbund movement, proposed a youthful männerbund (male elite) of Führern (leaders) commanding unconditional loyalty, a that which greatly influenced Henlein's politics.

Politics in the Sudetenland were divided between loyalists who wanted Sudeten Germans to take part in Czechoslovak elections, and separatist "negativists" who did not, Henlein among them. By 1928 the Turnerbund began to emerge as a proto-political party opposed to "activist" parties in the coalition governments in Prague. In an article published in December 1930 in the Turnerzeitung, Henlein called on Sudeten Germans to embrace völkisch ideology and condemned liberalism and democracy as "un-German". In May 1931, Henlein was elected president of the supposedly apolitical Turnerbund, and it became more overtly völkisch and militaristic. The purpose of the Turnerbund became to indoctrinate its members into the völkisch movement.

== Party leader ==
Knowing that the Czechoslovak authorities were about to ban the two main völkisch parties in the Sudetenland for treason, on 1 October 1933, Henlein founded the Sudetendeutsche Heimatfront ("Sudeten German Home Front", SHF). Although originally meant as a successor to the banned anti-Czech German National Socialist Workers' Party and German National Party, it soon became a big tent right-wing movement for autonomy for the German minority, rivalling the German Social Democratic Workers Party. Henlein's association with the Catholic Kameradschaftsbund, which followed the teachings of Austrian philosopher Othmar Spann, allowed him to argue that his movement was not a continuation of the banned parties. American historian Gerhard Weinberg described Henlein as "...a thirty-five year-old veteran of the war who had achieved prominence in a racist athletic organization in the Sudeten area. He now rallied around himself a motley assortment of elements that were long involved in internal feuds".

British historian Mark Cornwall wrote that he was "attractive to the Sudeten population precisely because of his ordinariness... an Everyman who represented the average Sudeten German's grievances". Ethnic Germans of the Sudetenland had been favored under the Austrian Empire and suddenly now were outsiders in the new Czechoslovak republic. Henlein saw himself as the founder of a volksgemeinschaft ("people's community") for all Sudeten Germans. Henlein presented the Sudeten Germans as a special and unique German community. This Sudeten "particularism" later caused Henlein much trouble under the Third Reich when grossdeutschland nationalists like Reinhard Heydrich took exception to these speeches. Cornwall wrote that "...there slowly developed a chasm between Henlein's self-perception as a Sudeten Führer and the reality of a man who lacked both charisma and political acumen."

=== Czech politics ===
In the early 1930s, Henlein took a pro-Czechoslovak and overtly anti-Nazi stance in his speeches, but as early as 15 May 1934, Czechoslovak Foreign Minister Edvard Beneš told President Tomáš Garrigue Masaryk that Henlein's Heimfront received financial support from Berlin. Beneš was correct. From April 1934 onward, it was subsidized by not only the Auswärtiges Amt, but also the Verband für das Deutschtum im Ausland ("Society for Germandom Abroad").

Henlein advocated Sudetenland autonomy, but was vague about what form this would take. To avoid having his party banned, Henlein presented the party's ideas as pro-democracy rather than anti-Czech. He spoke of Sudeten Germans living in a Central European "common space" with an identity that transcended loyalty to Czechoslovakia, part of a wider Germanic "common space" that embraced all of Central Europe. He advocated "reconciliation" between Germans and Czechs, provided that the Czechs recognised that they and the Sudetenlanders belonged to the Central European "common space". Despite his claims of loyalty to Czechoslovakia and its mosaic of peoples, Henlein portrayed life in Germany as far superior to Czechoslovakia, and encouraged his followers to boycott businesses owned by Czechs and Jews. He described the SdP as having a "Christian worldview", a code-word for anti-Semitism.

On 19 April 1935 the SHF was renamed Sudeten German Party (Sudetendeutsche Partei, SdP) under pressure from the Czechoslovak government. In the parliamentary election of May 1935, the SdP, with massive support from the Nazi Party, received 15.2% of the votes cast and become the strongest Czechoslovak party with about 68% of the ethnic German vote. Henlein capitalized on resentment over the unemployment rate in the Sudetenland, twice that in Bohemia and Moravia.

The SdP was being secretly subsidised by the Auswärtiges Amt and received 15,000 Reichsmark in 1935 alone from the German legation in Prague. In 1933 the subsidies greatly increased, and the SdP became the main recipient of German money in the spring of 1935. In part, the victory of the SdP in the 1935 elections was due to generous financial support from Germany; SdP ran a slick, polished campaign that overshadowed rival ethnic German parties.

Although the party was led "collectively", Henlein regularly exercised sole authority. He made decisions without consulting the committee he was ostensibly responsible to, and lied and dissembled to even his closest followers. He also summoned all of the SdP deputies to Eger (modern Cheb, Czech Republic) to publicly swear oaths of personal loyalty to him.

Not all committee members knew of the secret German funding, but Henlein's rival Karl Hermann Frank sometimes used the knowledge to blackmail him. Henlein claimed he had no contact with Germany, Weinberg wrote, but "...in fact the internal affairs of the Sudeten German party were being supervised by Berlin with the German government picking the leaders, settling the policy lines, and giving or withholding financial support as the situation appeared to dictate".

Though the SdP won the majority of the seats in the Sudetenland, the numerical dominance of the Czech parties ensured that the SdP was always going to be an opposition party. The main right-wing Czech parties favored preserving Czechoslovakia as a single state, and Henlein's talks with them quickly floundered over this issue. Czech public opinion was overwhelmingly hostile to calls to turn Czechoslovakia into a federation. The Czech government rejected Sudeten German autonomy, so Henlein courted foreign governments, especially Britain, in the hope that they would pressure the Czech government. Henlein's voters expected him to achieve his platform of autonomy and his turn to "foreign policy" in 1935 reflected his fear of disappointing his supporters.

=== Contact with Britain ===
Henlein first met British spy and RAF Group-Captain Graham Christie, his main conduit to the British for the next three years, in July 1935. Henlein enjoyed being courted by foreign governments, as it strengthened his authority over his party, where his leadership was frequently questioned.

In December 1935, Henlein gave a lecture at Chatham House in London on the Sudeten Germans. Historian Robert William Seton-Watson interviewed Henlein afterwards and in a summary wrote that Henlein accepted:

...the existing constitution, treaties and the Minority treaties as the basis of a settlement between Czechoslovakia and the Sudeten Germans. He ruled out not only all questions of German Bohemia (either as a whole or in part) uniting with Germany, but also admitted the impossibility of separating the German and Czech districts, and insisted on the essential unity of the Bohemian lands throughout history and no less today.

Henlein told Seton-Watson that he only criticized Czechoslovakia as a "dishonest democracy". Henlein admitted his party was völkisch, but denied having any contacts with Germany, and said that claims his party was subsidized by the Germans were a "lie". Seton-Watson asked if it was really possible for someone to believe in both völkisch ideology and German-Czech equality, but wrote that Henlein seemed very sincere.

Few in Britain had paid attention to Czechoslovakia before 1938, but the few who did tended to cite the "injustices" of the treaties of Versailles and St. Germain: that the Sudetenland was not allowed to join Germany or Austria as the majority of the Sudetenlanders had asked in 1918–19. Given these sympathies, Henlein was well received at the Chatham House.

In May 1936, Czechoslovak Prime Minister Milan Hodža declared in a speech: "The government would take care that Henlein achieved no success, and it was confident that the SdP would then split up into various factions that could then be more easily handed". On 12 June 1936, Henlein complained in a speech in Eger that the law in Czechoslovakia protected only the rights of individuals, not "racial groups".

In July 1936, Henlein again went to London and expounded upon various grievances felt by the volksdeutsche of Czechoslovakia. "It may well be that Germany has designs on Czechoslovakia in any event," wrote the Permanent Undersecretary of the Foreign Office, Sir Robert Vansittart after meeting him, "but it is quite certain that at present the Czechoslovak government are providing them with ... a first-class pretext". London knew from 1936 onward that Henlein's party was being secretly subsidised by Germany. One Foreign Office official wrote in April 1937 when a journalist from The News Chronicle presented evidence that Germany was financing the SdP that the documents "do not really tell us anything new". In the fall of 1936, President Beneš, despite his distaste for Henlein, tried to talk with him, but Henlein, on orders from Berlin, ignored the feelers.

Starting in January 1937, the British government pushed Benes to negotiate with Henlein, but Beneš refused. The French minister in Prague, Léopold Victor de Lacroix, supported Beneš, saying that any concession to Henlein would weaken Czechoslovakia, and thus the entire cordon sanitaire as the French alliance system in Eastern Europe was known. As France was Czechoslovakia's most powerful ally, Beneš felt no need to give in to the British pressure in 1937 for talks with Henlein about devolving power from the Castle. Weinberg argued that this was a great missed opportunity for Beneš as "...the way to show up Henlein as disloyal was for the Czechoslovak government to make him a real offer which he would either have to accept, thereby recognizing the willingness of the Prague government to make meaningful concessions, or reject and thereby show himself uninterested in agreement".

=== Beneš reaction ===
However, in February 1937, Beneš did promise "ethnic proportionality" in the Czechoslovak civil service, more funding for ethnic German cultural groups, a guarantee that government contracts for public works would go to businesses owned by ethnic Germans in areas where Germans where the majority, the distribution of government spending on a regional basis, and to allow greater use of German as one of the official languages of Czechoslovakia. On 27 April 1937, Henlein in a speech before the chamber of deputies demanded that all of the "racial groups" of Czechoslovakia be automatically enrolled in "national organisations" which would be separate legal entities and would direct all of the internal affairs of their own "racial group". Once a citizen had chosen their "national organisation" at the age of 18, they would not be allowed to leave it. Henlein concluded that each of the "racial groups" needed their own "national organisation" to provide the necessary space to allow them to develop in peace. These demands were rejected by Beneš as an attempt to gut Czechoslovak unity by turning it into a series of corporate "racial groups" governing themselves. However, Henlein's demands served to distract attention from the February reforms and allowed him to once again present the Sudeten Germans as being "oppressed" by Beneš, supposedly denying them the right to their own "racial identity".

In the meantime, Henlein engaged in a "soft power" offensive, and was interviewed by the famous historian Arnold J. Toynbee for The Economist in July 1937. He insisted he was loyal to Czechoslovakia, but talked much about the Czech-dominated government discriminating against the Sudeten Germans. The speech by Hodža, where he pointed out the Czechoslovak state provided far more money in subsidies to German cultural groups than to cultural groups of the other minorities and that government spending in the Sudetenland was well above the 23% level required by "the principle of proportionality" which required that spending be matched to the size of the ethnic groups, attracted little attention in the British media, which largely repeated variations of Henlein's line that the Sudeten Germans were the victims of "oppression" by the Czech-dominated Czechoslovak state.

Henlein did not become a declared follower of Adolf Hitler until 1937, after the pro-German camp within the SdP represented by Karl Hermann Frank emerged victorious. In October 1937 the Czechoslovak authorities were tipped off (possibly by the German secret service) about the homosexuality of his close ally Heinz Rutha, who was imprisoned on charges that he had had sexual relations with young men active in the SdP. Rutha hanged himself in a jail cell awaiting trial. Henlein swiftly aligned himself with the slogan Ein Volk, ein Reich, ein Führer! ("One People, One Country, One Leader!"), thus calling for the predominantly (typically more than 80%) German-speaking Sudetenland to be a part of Germany. Unknown to Henlein, on 5 November 1937 at the conference in Berlin recorded in the Hossbach Memorandum, Hitler declared that he was planning to attack Austria and Czechoslovakia in the very near future. British historian Richard Overy noted that in the Hossbach memorandum Hitler said nothing about Czechoslovakia's treatment of the Sudeten Germans as a reason for war, instead saying that Germany was falling behind in the arms race with Britain and France, and so needed to conquer Czechoslovakia to exploit its resources, industries and people to take the lead in the arms race and to provide for economic autarky to make Germany immune to a British blockade.

On 19 November 1937, Henlein wrote to Hitler asking him to support him as the sole leader of the Sudeten German community, and declared his belief that ethnic Germans and Czechs simply could not coexist in the same country, and his willingness to support any German foreign move that would bring the Sudetenland "home to the Reich". The Rutha scandal together with Henlein's inability to achieve the autonomy he had promised his voters in 1935 left Henlein's position as party leader weakened, so he decided to fully align himself with Berlin as the only way to save his career. On 3 November 1937, Henlein in a letter to Christie wrote: "the policy which I have represented up to now is only sustainable if it results in concrete success".

== 1938 crisis ==
The dominance by Henlein's political party of the Sudetenland in the 1930s set off the crisis that led to the Munich Agreement on 30 September 1938. On 12 March 1938, British Foreign Secretary Lord Halifax told Jan Masaryk, the Czechoslovak minister in London, that his government should try to negotiate with Henlein, but Masaryk replied that Henlein was not to be trusted and it was a waste of time to talk to him. The Austrian Anschluss in March 1938 caused much excitement in the Sudetenland and the SdP held huge rallies with portraits of Hitler prominently displayed and crowds shouting "Ein Volk, ein Reich, ein Führer!" and "Home to the Reich!". Henlein declared at these rallies that now more than ever his party was the only party that spoke for the Sudetenland. Two of the Sudeten "activist" parties, the Christian Social Party and the German Agrarian Party, both quit the government in Prague, declaring that they stood behind Führer Henlein.

=== Enabling the invasion of Czechoslovakia ===
Henlein secretly visited Berlin to meet Hitler, and agreed to provide a pretext for a German invasion by demanding autonomy for the Sudetenland. Hitler believed that Italy could hold both Britain and France in check and that there was no danger that a German attack on Czechoslovakia would cause a wider war. Henlein's role would be to make demands that the Castle could never accept. At a second meeting on 29 March 1938 also attended by Hitler, Henlein, Foreign Minister Joachim von Ribbentrop and State Secretary Ernst von Weizsäcker to work out the tactics, Henlein was told to always come across as moderate, not to move too quickly, and above all never to negotiate in good faith.

Hitler made it clear that he did not want a general war in 1938 and that it was necessary to isolate Czechoslovakia internationally by making it appear that the Czechoslovak government was being intransigent, which was especially important given that France and Czechoslovakia had signed a defensive alliance in 1924. Hitler also authorized Henlein to contact other parties representing the Slovak, Polish, Ukrainian and Magyar minorities for a joint campaign to make Czechoslovakia into a federation, as this would make Czechoslovakia appear unstable and rickety, and hence presumably increase the unwillingness of France to go to war for a state that seemed unlikely to last. Finally, Henlein was told to ask only for autonomy, but to subtly promote the message that ethnic Germans and Czechs could not co-exist in the same country. On 5 April 1938, Henlein told a Hungarian diplomat that "whatever the Czech government might offer, he would always raise still higher demands...he wanted to sabotage an understanding by all means".

On 24 April 1938, at a party congress in Karlsbad, Czechoslovakia (now Karlovy Vary, in the Czech Republic) Henlein announced the eight-point Karlsbad programme for Sudetenland autonomy, while insisting that he and his party were loyal to Czechoslovakia. The apparent moderation of the Karlsbad programme, demanding only autonomy, was intended to make Czechoslovakia appear intransigent, "forcing" Germany to invade.

Hitler wanted the demand for German regiments to be the ninth point in the Karlsbad programme, but Henlein persuaded him that it was too inflammatory and too likely to alienate public opinion abroad. The Karlsbad programme set off the crisis that led to the Munich Agreement in September. Henlein's speech in Karlsbad received extensive newspaper coverage all over the world, and raised acute tensions between Berlin and Prague when the German government declared its support for the Karlsbad programme. At the Karlsbad party congress, Henlein also added the "Aryan paragraph" to the StP, formally adopting völkisch racism. Despite this, Basil Newton, the British minister in Prague, described Henlein to London as a "moderate", saying it was time for the Castle to make concessions before Henlein lost control of his party.

Czechoslovakia was allied to France. Britain would intervene in a Franco-German war rather than risk a French defeat that would make Germany the dominant power in Europe. The Soviet Union, also allied to Czechoslovakia, would be drawn in the war as well.

=== Hitler ignoring his generals ===
Much of the Wehrmacht leadership, led by Chief of the General Staff General Ludwig Beck, objected to Hitler's plans as likely to cause a war with France, the Soviet Union and probably also Britain, at a time when they believed that German re-armament was not advanced enough for another world war. Until the spring of 1938, German military planning assumed that when the Reich went to war with France again, which the entire Wehrmacht leadership regarded as both inevitable and desirable, it would also go to war with France's ally Czechoslovakia. In the spring of 1938, Hitler decided to attack Czechoslovakia, on the assumption that France would remain neutral, which Beck and Hermann Göring regarded as absurd. On 21 April 1938, Hitler told General Wilhelm Keitel of the OKW the "political preconditions" for a war against Czechoslovakia. The "expendable" Baron Ernst von Eisenlohr, the German minister in Prague, was to be assassinated, as justification for a German attack on Czechoslovakia. On 28 May 1938 Hitler issued orders for Fall Grün, the invasion of Czechoslovakia, scheduled for 1 October 1938.

German ambassador to Great Britain von Dirksen advised Berlin that the German position would seem stronger to the British if Henlein and his movement were not seen as working for Berlin, and that Henlein should visit London to promote this idea. Henlein first went to Berlin, where he was given a memo written by Weizsäcker telling him what to say in London: "Henlein will deny in London that he is acting on instructions from Berlin...Finally, Henlein will speak of the progressive disintegration of the Czech political structure, in order to discourage those circles which consider that their intervention on behalf of this structure may still be of use". Starting on 12 May 1938, Henlein visited London and impressed almost everyone he met as an apparently reasonable, mild-mannered man full of genial charm, who just wanted autonomy for his people. Henlein told British politicians that he was not working for Hitler, that the Czechs were "oppressing" the Sudetenland by forcing the children in some districts to attend classes taught in Czech, and insisted he only wanted autonomy for the Sudetenland. Henlein promoted the idea that he only wanted a "fair deal" for the Sudeten and claimed that he opposed the Sudetenland joining Germany, noting that after the Anschluss Austrian Nazis were pushed aside by the Germans. He said he did not want the same thing to happen to him, but did admit that if Prague refused to give in to all eight demands of the Karlsbad programme, Germany would definitely invade. No British cabinet ministers met Henlein, as it was felt to be inappropriate for ministers of the Crown to meet an opposition politician from another country, but he did meet with many backbenchers and journalists, who came away sympathetic to Henlein's movement. Henlein was however unable to explain just precisely how a one-party state could co-exist inside a democracy. On 15 May 1938, Henlein left London for Berlin, where he called his visit a great success.

In the May 1938 local elections in the Sudetenland, the SdP candidates for town and village councils won 87%–90% of the votes cast, indicating that a majority of the Sudeten Germans were behind Henlein. Frustrated with the unwillingness of Henlein and Hodža to talk, in the summer of 1938 the British government, believing that both parties wanted an agreement, sent an intermediary to Czechoslovakia they thought might be able to break the deadlock. In his August 1938 visit, British Liberal politician Lord Runciman fell under Henlein's influence. He was said to have told Henlein to stop inciting violence, but the report he wrote largely reflected Henlein's ideas, for example, that ethnic Germans and Czechs simply could not live together and should be separated.

In August 1938, Group-Captain Graham Christie met Henlein in a beer-hall in Karlsbad, and reported that unlike his usual mild-mannered self, Henlein under the influence of alcohol was abusive and arrogant, saying he hated the Czechs and did not want to live with them in the same state anymore. On 17 August 1938, General Louis-Eugène Faucher, the French military attache in Prague, reported to Paris that Czechoslovak military intelligence had presented him with conclusive evidence that Henlein was planning, together with the Abwehr (German military intelligence), a September uprising in the Sudetenland. The initial plan for the Anschluss had called for Austrian Nazis to assassinate as a pretext Franz von Papen, the German ambassador to Vienna. The same plan was adopted for Czechoslovakia; Henlein ordered some of his followers to put on police uniforms and assassinate Baron Ernst von Eisenlohr to provide a pretext for war when the time was right, as well as to have attack the police, to create further incidents.

In early September 1938, President Beneš announced the "Fourth Plan" for constitutional change to make Czechoslovakia into a federation, which did not meet all of the demands of the Karlsbad programme, but did grant autonomy to the Sudetenland. In response, Henlein announced on 7 September 1938 that the "Fourth Plan" was unacceptable. On 9 September 1938, Benito Mussolini formally endorsed all eight points of the Karlsbad programme and denounced Czechoslovakia as "tainted" by its alliances with France and the Soviet Union. From 12 September 1938 forward, Henlein helped organise hundreds of terrorist attacks and two coup attempts by the Sudetendeutsches Freikorps a paramilitary organisation affiliated with the SS-Totenkopfverbände, immediately after Hitler's threatening speech in Nuremberg at the Nazi Party's annual rally on 12 September 1938. Hitler dropped Sudetenland autonomy and formally demanded that it join Germany. The attempted uprising was quickly suppressed by Czechoslovak forces. Henlein fled to Germany, only to start numerous intrusions into Czechoslovak territory around Aš as a commander of Sudeten guerilla bands. Henlein's flight was widely seen as cowardice, and he remained always very sensitive about criticism of his actions in September 1938.

Hitler's plans for Fall Grün (Case Green), scheduled for 1 October 1938, were foiled by Britain, who took at face value Hitler's claim that all he wanted was the Sudetenland, and did not realize that the issue was a pretext. Greek historian Aristotle Kallis wrote: "The problem [for Hitler] was that the British government took the irredentist alibi of Nazi expansionism quite seriously, eager to make concessions on these lines, without realising that no territorial offer on ethnic grounds would never satisfy the geographical prerequisites of the fascist 'new order'". Kallis noted that Hitler's plans had always called for the conquest of all of Czechoslovakia, not just the Sudetenland. The fact that Britain kept pressuring Czechoslovakia in September 1938 to make concessions sabotaged Hitler's plan for war based on the assumption that the Castle would not make concessions on the Sudetenland issue. Kallis wrote that Hitler's claim that he was only concerned about the treatment of ethnic Germans in the Sudetenland can be seen as dishonest, since until 1939 he completely ignored the South Tyrol region of Italy, whose ethnic German population was treated far worse.

When Hitler finally did turn to South Tyrol in 1939, he signed the South Tyrol Option Agreement with Mussolini calling for the German-speakers of South Tyrol to either move to Germany or be Italianized. For Hitler, an alliance with Fascist Italy outweighed any concern for the persecuted German community of South Tyrol. As the countdown for a war scheduled to begin on 1 October continued, it dawned on Henlein that the Sudetenland was going to become a war zone, which caused him to sink into depression. But on 27 September 1938 when Hitler decided not to go to war after all, citing the unenthusiastic response of the people of Berlin to a huge military parade he had ordered. He could not go to war with the German people not behind him, he said. On 28 September 1938, Hitler told French ambassador André François-Poncet that he was willing to attend a conference in Munich to discuss a peaceful solution to the crisis, with Mussolini as a mediator. The Munich Agreement of 30 September 1938 ended the crisis and stated the Sudetenland was to "go home to the Reich" peacefully over a ten-day period in October 1938. Hitler saw the Munich Agreement as a diplomatic defeat as it "cheated" him out of the war he had planned to start the next day, but Henlein was greatly relieved.

== German occupation ==
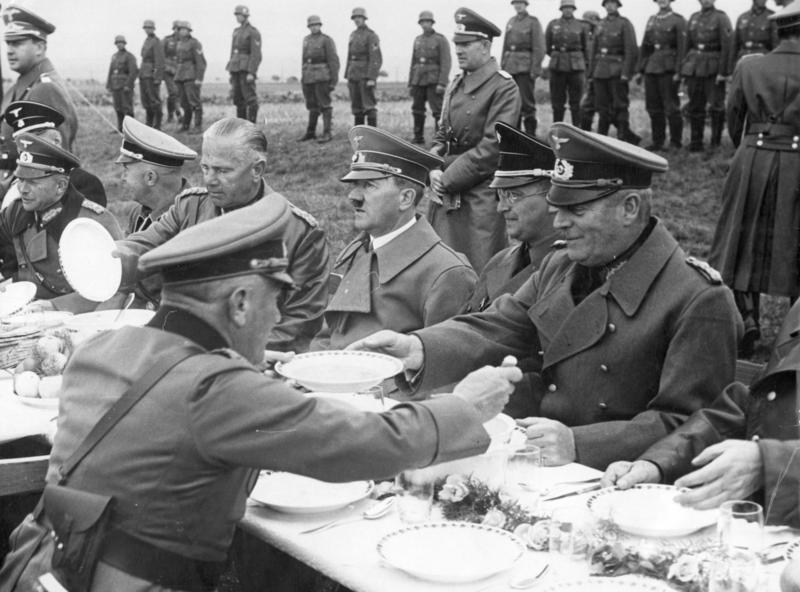
Rest during the German invasion on the road to Franzensbad: Henlein in uniform sitting between Hitler and General Wilhelm Keitel (right), 3 October 1938

Upon the Wehrmacht's entry into the Sudetenland, on 1 October 1938 Henlein was appointed Reichskommissar and Gauleiter for Reichsgau Sudetenland and became a SS-Gruppenführer (later an SS-Obergruppenführer).

Henlein organized the Kristallnacht pogrom in the Sudetenland on 9 November 1938, which smashed Jewish homes and businesses. and was deeply involved in a campaign for the "de-Jewification" of the Sudeten economy, confiscating businesses and properties owned by Jews. He himself confiscated a villa in Reichenberg (modern Liberec, Czech Republic) from a Jewish businessman. It remained his home until 1945. Henlein was elected to the Reichstag in December 1938 and formally joined the Nazi Party on 26 January 1939.

=== Nazi politics ===
When Germans took over what remained of Czechoslovakia in March 1939, Henlein served one month as head of the civil administration of the Protectorate of Bohemia and Moravia, nominally making him the number-two-man in the Protectorate behind Reichsprotektor Konstantin von Neurath. Henlein welcomed the creation of the Protectorate of Bohemia-Moravia as restoring "natural Czech subservience" to the Germans, saying that Bohemia and Moravia were "German lands" that had unfortunately ended up "occupied" by the Czechs, who now would serve as a "demographic and economic resources" to be exploited by Germany. However, most of the power ended up in the hands of his long-time rival Karl Hermann Frank. On 1 May 1939, Henlein was named Reichsstatthalter (Reich Governor) of Reichsgau Sudetenland, thereby holding both the highest party and governmental offices in his jurisdiction. On 16 November 1942, he was named Reich Defense Commissioner for the Reichsgau. He continued to hold these positions until the end of the war.

Henlein attempted to place his long-term followers in key positions in his Reichsgau and, starting in the spring of 1939, became locked into a battle over patronage with Reinhard Heydrich. Cornwall described them as "ideologically close", with the principal differences between Henlein's emphasis on Sudeten "particularism" as opposed to Heydrich's Großdeutschland nationalism. Heydrich felt that Henlein should present the SdP as an unambiguously völkisch party. In late 1939, Heydrich struck at Henlein by arresting over 50 leading Sudeten Nazis – all of them closely associated with Henlein's mentor Heinz Rutha – on charges of being part of a homosexual group who used their positions in the SdP in the 1930s to recruit young men for sex. Heydrich let the accused go on trial in early 1940 rather than taking them into "protective custody" when the courts heard lurid stories of how in the 1930s the SdP leaders had engaged in homosexual orgies.

Faced with that threat, Henlein went to Berlin to meet Heydrich and agreed to fire deputy Gauleiter Fritz Köllner and replace him with Heydrich's nominee, Richard Donnevert. Hitler tended to side with his Gauleiters, and made clear that he was behind Henlein, so removing him was not practical for Heydrich, who therefore tried to neutralize him by removing his followers from the local NSDAP. In March 1940, at a party rally in Hohenelbe (modern Vrchlabí, Czech Republic), Henlein formally denouncing Rutha—the best man at his wedding in 1926—as a homosexual "pervert", and embraced Heydrich's Großdeutschland nationalism, asserting that Sudeten Germans were no different from the Reichdeutsch.

Henlein's pursued a "merciless" vendetta against the Czechs in the Sudetenland, who numbered about 300,000 (~10% of the population). An "apartheid" regime was designed to ensure the total physical separation of the German and Czech communities, with the Czechs forced to accept considerably inferior facilities. Henlein said that Czechs were to serve as helots to the Germans, and banned Czech children from going beyond primary school, believing that education would encourage them to demand equality. In 1942–43, he confiscated much land owned by ethnic Czech farmers unable to pay their taxes, and gave it to 3,000 settlers from Germany. Henlein's policy was the complete Germanization of the Sudetenland, and only the unwillingness of the authorities in Bohemia-Moravia to accept the ethnic Czechs of the Sudetenland prevented Henlein from expelling them all. However, the need of the German state for Czechs to work in war industries, especially when so many Sudeten German men had been called up for service with the Wehrmacht, meant that the Sudetenland had more Czechs living in it in 1945 than in 1938. Henlein protested against bringing Czechs from Bohemia-Moravia to work in the Sudetenland's factories and farms, which counteracted his policy of reducing the Czech population, but Berlin said that the needs of war industry and agriculture were far more important than his anti-Czech obsessions.

When Henlein heard of Heydrich's assassination, he celebrated by visiting the local beer-hall.

In late 1942, Henlein deported the last Jews to Theresienstadt. For the next two years, Henlein reigned supreme in his Gau and rehired many of the men he had been forced to fire in 1940. Henlein's willingness to assert himself won him the respect of Martin Bormann who called him in July 1944 a "historic personality" and "an especially reliable party comrade".

In the last days of World War II, in what Cornwall called a "mad scheme", Heinlen tried to persuade Hitler to abandon Berlin for the Sudetenland, to continue the war and launch a new invasion of the Soviet Union from its mountains.

== Arrest and suicide ==
On 10 May 1945, while in American captivity in the barracks of Pilsen, he committed suicide by cutting his veins with his broken glasses. He was buried anonymously in the Plzeň Central Cemetery.

The annexation of Sudetenland to Germany was reversed after the war. Almost the entire ethnic German population of the Sudetenland was transferred to Germany and Austria in 1945–46 under the Beneš decrees. In Czech, Henleinovci ('Henleinists') is a term of abuse, meaning a traitor or fifth-columnist.

== In fiction ==
Harry Turtledove's The War That Came Early alternate history novel series begins with Henlein being assassinated on 28 September 1938, causing a version of WWII to begin in 1938.

"Henleinists" are a looming presence throughout Martha Gellhorn's novel A Stricken Field (1940). Republished 2011, ISBN 0226286967.

Henlein is the subject of a murder investigation by detective Bernie Gunther in Philip Kerr's novel Prague Fatale. Published 2011.

He was also portrayed in the Czechoslovak film "Jára Cimrman ležíci spíci", where he is a child living in the fictional village of Liptákov.

== See also ==
- Germans in Czechoslovakia (1918–1938)
- List SS-Obergruppenführer
