= Richard Donnevert =

German politician (1896–1970)

Richard Donnevert (2 August 1896 in Mainz – 27 January 1970 in Wiesbaden) was a German Nazi Party politician.

Donnevert studied medicine at the University of Göttingen and submitted his doctoral thesis in 1922. A dentist by profession, Donnevert held a number of party administration posts in the early 1930s whilst also serving as a member of the Schutzstaffel, reaching the rank of SS-Oberführer.

Donnevert worked in the office of the Deputy Führer until in 1940 when he was sent by Rudolf Hess and Martin Bormann to serve as deputy Gauleiter in the Sudetenland with specific instructions to control his new superior Konrad Henlein. Henlein was aware of Donnevert's intrigues against him and was able to engineer his deputy's removal from office. Donnevert remained on the pay-roll of the SS after this, albeit with little of real purpose to do, and he retreated into alcoholism. On 19 August 1940, Donnevert obtained a seat in the Reichstag representing the Sudetenland as a replacement for Josef Kraus, and he served until the end of Nazi rule in May 1945.
