= Corporate statism =

Corporatist political culture

Corporate statism or state corporatism is a political culture and a form of corporatism whereby corporate groups form the basis of society and the state. By this principle, the state requires all citizens to belong to one of several officially designated interest groups (based generally on economic sector), which consequently have great control of their members. Such interest groups thus attain public status, and they or their representatives participate with national policymaking, at least formally.

Societies have existed historically which exemplified corporate statism, for instance as propounded by Othmar Spann in Austria and implemented by Benito Mussolini's regime in Italy (1922–1943), António de Oliveira Salazar's Estado Novo in Portugal (1933–1974) and by the interwar Federal State of Austria. After World War II, corporate statism influenced the rapid development of South Korea and Japan under the LDP.

Corporate statism most commonly manifests itself as a ruling party acting as a mediator between the workers, capitalists and other major state interests by incorporating them institutionally into the government. Corporatist systems were most prevalent during the mid-20th century in Europe and later elsewhere in developing countries. One criticism is that interests, both social and economic, are so diverse that a state cannot possibly define or organize them effectively by incorporating them. Corporate statism differs from corporate nationalism in that it is a social mode of organization rather than economic nationalism operating by means of private business corporations. The topic remains controversial in some countries, including South Korea, Japan, and Portugal.

== See also ==
- Chaebol — a type of very large South Korean business conglomerate
- Zaibatsu — a type of very large Japanese business conglomerate
- Keiretsu — a type of very large Japanese business conglomerate
- Miracle on the Han River — an economic transformation in South Korea
- Japanese economic miracle — an economic transformation in Japan
- Taiwan Miracle — an economic transformation in Taiwan
- East Asian Miracle — an economic transformation in East and Southeast Asian countries
- Corporatocracy — a government dominated by business interests, often mistaken for corporatism
- Fascism — a political ideology that includes corporate statism as a component
- Folkhemmet — The name given to the Swedish variant of corporatism, sometimes called Social corporatism
- State capitalism — an economic form in which state-controlled enterprises dominate the economy and operate for-profit
