= Kameradschaftsbund (Czechoslovakia) =

Interwar Sudeten German nationalist group

The Kameradschaftsbund (KB) was a Völkisch organization, founded in 1920s Czechoslovakia. It was a meeting ground of Sudeten German intellectuals, preparing them to take up leadership roles in a possible future independent Sudetenland.

Walther Heinrich and Heinz Rutha were founders of the movement, and drew heavily on the theories of Othmar Spann. At the end of the 1920s, the movement also became politically active, including the infiltration of the Turnverband by Konrad Henlein, one of the earliest KB members. Many Kameradschaftsbund members later obtained top positions in the Sudetendeutsche Partei (SdP), under Karl Hermann Frank and Walter Brand. After Rutha was charged with homosexual activity in 1937 (he later committed suicide), the KB gradually lost its influence on the SdP; Heinrich was sent to a concentration camp in 1938, and the SdP itself had to openly embrace German National Socialism.
