= Johannes von Tepl =

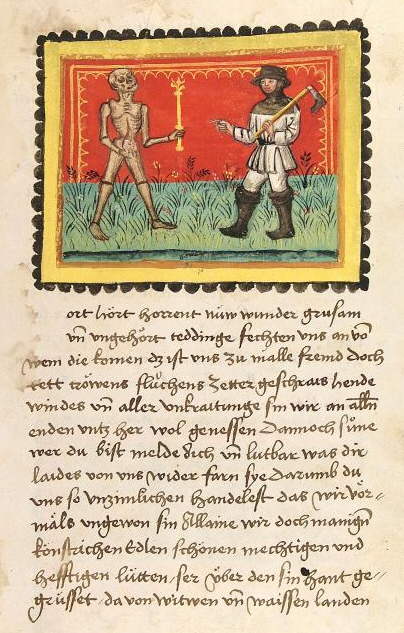
Page from an illuminated manuscript of Der Ackermann aus Böhmen, c. 1470

Johannes von Tepl (c. 1350 – c. 1415), also known as Johannes von Saaz (Czech: Jan ze Žatce), was a Bohemian writer of the German language, one of the earliest known writers of prose in Early New High German (or late Middle German—depending on the criteria). He was literate in Czech, German, and Latin.

Not much is known about him; historians presume that he probably studied at universities in Prague, Bologna, and Padua. In 1383, he became a solicitor in Žatec (Saaz) and in 1386 a rector of the town's Latin school. He lived in Prague from 1411. He spent almost all of his life in the Kingdom of Bohemia, during the reign of kings Charles and Wenceslaus.

Johannes von Tepl is best known for his early humanist poem Der Ackermann aus Böhmen (Ploughman of Bohemia), sometimes also called Der Ackermann und der Tod (Ploughman and Death), written around 1401 and first printed in 1460. It is a dialogue between Death and a ploughman, who accuses Death because his wife Margaretha recently died. Central themes of the book are their opposing views on life, mankind, and morality. (In the history of Bohemia, the ploughman is an important symbol of Bohemian kings—Přemysl, the legendary founder of the Přemyslid dynasty, was originally a ploughman.) The poem is regarded as one of the most important German poems in the late Middle Ages.
