= Der Ackermann aus Böhmen =

1401 work of prose by Johannes von Tepl

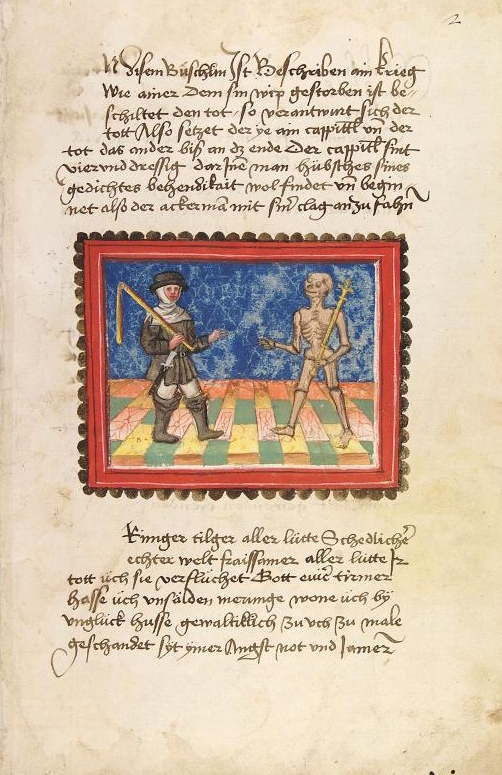
- Folio 2v of the manuscript UB Heidelberg, Cod. pal. germ. 76
- Type: Poetry
- Language: German
- Author: Johannes von Tepl

Der Ackermann aus Böhmen (German for "The Ploughman from Bohemia"), also known as Der Ackermann und der Tod ("The Ploughman and Death"), is a work of prose in Early New High German by Johannes von Tepl, written around 1401. Sixteen manuscripts and seventeen early printed editions are preserved; the earliest printed version dates to 1460 and is one of the two earliest printed books in German. It is remarkable for the high level of its language and vocabulary and is considered one of the most important works of late medieval German literature.

It is a spirited dialogue between the ploughman, whose wife Margaretha has recently died, and Death. Central themes of the book are their opposing views on life, mankind, and morality. The work also represents a concept of marriage as a communion of love, a notion not generally accepted at the time.

The work consists of 34 short chapters. In odd-numbered chapters the ploughman accuses Death of robbing him of his beloved young wife. In the even chapters Death answers, setting logic and cynicism against the emotions of the ploughman. In Chapter 33, God appears and judges the dispute: he reminds the ploughman that he owes his life to God, and reminds Death that he owes his powers to God. "So plaintiff, yours is the honour! And Death, yours is the victory! Every man is obliged to give his life to Death, his body to the earth, and his soul to Us." Chapter 34 is a lyrical prayer of the ploughman for the soul of his wife.

The work has been seen as a precursor of early humanism in German literature, especially by Konrad Burdach. The opposite position, that the work should be viewed in the tradition of medieval literature, was argued by Arthur Hübner.

There is also the question of whether the work is a mere exercise in courtly style or represents the processing of the author's personal experiences. The former is supported by a letter that Johannes von Tepl wrote in Latin to a friend to accompany the work; in it, he exclusively stresses the work's stylistic merits. The latter is supported by the fact that the author's first wife had died in 1400, that the protagonist's plough is described as a feather (i.e. he is a writer), and that the initial letters of the last chapter's prayer spell JOHANNES.

== Relevant literature in English ==
- Schneider, Christian. 2014. Divine Wisdom: The Christological Interpretation of Sapientia in Johannes von Tepl’s Der Ackermann. The German Quarterly 87.3: 277-296.
