= Othmar Spann =

Austrian philosopher, sociologist and economist (1878–1950)

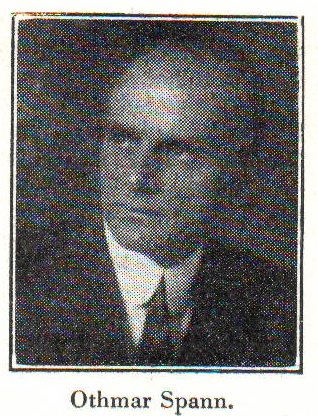
- Born: 1 October 1878; Altmannsdorf, Vienna, Austria-Hungary
- Died: 8 July 1950 (aged 71); Neustift bei Schlaining, Austria

Philosophical work
- Era: 20th-century philosophy
- Region: Western philosophy
- Main interests: Economics; Social philosophy; Political philosophy
- Notable ideas: Corporate statism

Othmar Spann (1 October 1878 – 8 July 1950) was a conservative Austrian philosopher, sociologist and economist. His radical anti-liberal and anti-socialist views, based on early 19th century Romantic ideas expressed by Adam Müller et al. and popularized in his books and lecture courses, helped antagonise political factions in Austria during the interwar years.

== Early life ==
Othmar Spann was the son of Josef Spann, a manufacturer and inventor. He grew up in Altmannsdorf, a suburban area of Vienna, Austria. He had three siblings and after the early death of his mother, his father was no longer able to provide for the family. From the age of 12, Spann therefore grew up with his maternal grandmother, whose husband was a former sergeant and whose military-oriented lifestyle was in contrast to that of his father. He attended a Bürgerschule and graduated in 1898. Afterwards, he studied philosophy at the University of Vienna, followed by political sciences of Zürich and Bern. He received his doctorate in political science from the University of Tübingen in 1903.

From 1903 to 1907, Spann worked for the "Center for Private Welfare Service" in Frankfurt. He was responsible for empirical studies of this population of workers. By the end of 1904, Spann, along with Hermann Beck and Hanns Dorn founded a newspaper called "Critical Pages for the whole Social Sciences".

On 17 October 1906 Spann married the poet Erika Spann-Rheinsch (1880–1967), with whom he had sons Adalbert Spann (1907–1942) and Rafael Spann (1909–1983). The grave of Othmar Spann and his wife has been preserved at the local cemetery in Bergwerk.

In 1907, Spann wrote his "Habilitation in Political Economy" for the Hochschule in Brünn. From 1907 to 1909, he was given the position of "Privatdozent" which allowed him to teach and collect fees from students. As early as 1908, Spann began working as the full-time imperial-royal vice-secretary of the statistic central commission in Vienna. He was given the position of creating a new census for Austria between 1909 and 1910.

In 1909, he was appointed to the German Technical University in Brno as an extraordinary professor, and from 1911 to 1919 as a full professor of economics and statistics.

From 1914 to 1918, during the First World War, Spann was a first lieutenant of the reserve. He was injured during the Battle of Lemberg, (now Lviv, Ukraine) on 27 August 1914. When he recovered he was first a commander of a company of Russian prisoners and then until later in 1918 he was given a position on the "scientific committee for wartime economy" with the war Ministry in Vienna.

In 1919, at the instigation of the Austrian Minister of Education Emerich Czermak, he was appointed full professor of economics and social studies at the University of Vienna, where he was supposed to form a philosophical counter-position to Austro-Marxism. The city of Vienna was considered a stronghold of Austro-Marxist positions, and at the law faculty they represented the dominant university philosophy. With the appointment of Spann, the Christian-social teaching administration aimed to create an ideological bulwark against Austrian social democracy and Bolshevism. With his 1920 lecture series entitled The True State, Spann began to set the direction for his corporatist theory, universalism. In 1921, the lectures were published in book form under the same title. In his work, he developed a holistic theory based on Adam Heinrich Müller. The anti-democratic and anti-Marxist ideas propagated in it were particularly popular with German nationalist and conservative Catholic student groups in Austria and the Sudetenland and he quickly rose to a cult figure.

Spann was popular with students, not only for his lectures which would spill out into the hallways at the university, but also for mid-summer festivals which he would hold in the woods where he would teach that "the ability to intuit essences was nurtured by jumping over the fire..." (Caldwell 2004, 138-9)

== Activism and career ==
In 1928 he also became a board member of the Kampfbund für deutsche Kultur (KfdK).The first public event of the Kampfbund took place on 23 February 1929 in the auditorium maximum of the Ludwig-Maximilians-Universität München, where he gave a speech about the cultural crisis of the present, which was well received in the media at the time. Spann called for the authoritarian corporate state as a “third way” between democracy and Marxism. However, due to differences with the organization’s leadership, he was expelled from the Kampfbund in 1931.

From 1933, he was editor of the Ständisches Leben magazine, which was closely related to Nazism. On 1 May 1933 he became a secret member of the Nazi party.

He supported the burning of books, but not the extent of anti-Semitism. Beginning in 1935, his ideas were increasingly attacked by Nazi organs. Between 1936 and 1938, when the NSDAP was banned in Austria, there was an illegal printing shop in his castle in Bergwerk.

Repeatedly, Spann tried to draw the ruling powers' attention to his authoritarian theory of a corporate state, which he thought should be introduced immediately for the benefit of all. Around 1930, he also joined the Nazi Party. In 1933 the Austro-Hungarian social philosopher Karl Polanyi wrote that Spann had given Fascism its first comprehensive philosophical system, and that his idea of anti-individualism (Note: "Moral decay in Liberalism, cultural paralysis through Democracy, and final degradation by Socialism", are inevitable. Polanyi, K., "The Essence of Fascism" (1933-4, p. 362, n.1.).) had become its guiding principle.

== Spannian universalism ==
Spann's authoritarian-corporate holistic doctrine of universalism (also known as Spannism) was based on an ontological metaphysics that Spann created by connecting various lines of thought from politics, social science and economics. In terms of the history of ideas, his universalism was essentially based on Plato's theory of ideas, medieval German mysticism, Hegel's idealism and the philosophy of romanticism. He published works from these schools of thought in his multi-volume anthology Die Herdflamme.

Spann saw the most important task of universalism in “overcoming individualistic social and economic theory”. During his academic career, Spann wrote numerous socio-political writings, of which his work The True State of 1921 is considered the most important. The term spannism is also used for universalism. In it he developed a “social model based on medieval guilds, structured by estates and characterized by hierarchy, which, instead of equal voting rights for the citizens, knew the election of a supreme leader by the leaders of the diverse, structured masses and associations.” According to Spann, the people were neither constituted by the state, nor by race or language, but only through a "spiritual community". Spann saw this in the Germans in their ethnic “people” and their “people’s property”. This universalistic-idealistic social doctrine was directed against rationalism, liberalism, materialism and Marxism and called for a reorganization of state and society on a professional basis (corporate state).

The universalist teachings of Spann did not describe the world as an atomistic structure in the sense of market theory, but as an organic structure in the sense of structure theory. Within this organic whole, in which "each individual member could only be adequately defined in relation to the unit superior to it", the hierarchically structured social unit took precedence over the individual. Spann thought of the economic system in a tiered structure with the world economy at the top, which is further subdivided in descending order into national economies, regional economies, business associations, companies and individual economists.

== Notable students ==
- Oskar Morgenstern
- Friedrich Hayek, winner of the 1974 Nobel prize
- Eric Voegelin

== Removal from teaching ==
Although to a large degree in tune with the Zeitgeist, he repeatedly met with disapproval until, in 1938, right after the Anschluss, he was briefly imprisoned by the Nazis and eventually barred from his professorship at the University of Vienna, which he had held since 1919.

In 1938 he was arrested and allegedly interned for four months in the Dachau concentration camp, where he is said to have contracted serious eye problems as a result of the abuse. A detention in the Dachau concentration camp could not be proven in the archives.

Living as a recluse till the end of the war, Spann tried to get his university post back in 1945, aged 67. However, he was not allowed to resume his teaching and died in 1950, disappointed and embittered.

== Reception ==
=== Economics ===
According to Helmut Woll (1994), Othmar Spann is considered "the most influential economist of the Weimar period". Woll attributes Spann's universalism to the history of dogma.

=== Austrian representative of the Conservative Revolution ===
According to Armin Pfahl-Traughber, Spann applies to his corporate state theory as an Austrian representative of the ultra-nationalist Conservative Revolution. Pfahl-Traughber counts Spann as part of this intellectual current because of his positions, specifically as a representative of the young conservatives. According to Pfahl-Traughber, unlike many other conservative revolutionaries, Spann's corporate state theory provided a "concrete and comprehensive counter-proposal to the rejected democratic constitutional state". As an intellectual living and working in Austria, he only played a limited role in the formation and development of the Conservative Revolution, but his thinking also helped shape its main protagonists such as Edgar Julius Jung. Karl Bruckschwaiger (2005) assigns Othmar Spann's thinking to the Conservative Revolution, as defined in Rolf Peter Sieferle's work.

=== Placement and influence in political Catholicism ===
The universalists around Spann are assigned to the socio-romantic currents within political Catholicism, all of which represented "more or less backward-looking, oriented towards romanticism, feudalism and urban economy" views. In addition to the universalists around Spann, the groups around Anton Orel, Karl Lugmayer, Joseph Eberle and Ernst Karl Winter also count among the social romantics. In doing so, Spann rose with his direction in the interwar period "to the decisive exponent of the socio-romantic world of ideas". Jonas Hagedorn (2016) emphasizes that Spann's authoritarian-corporatist model of society is only one of a total of three variants of corporatism represented by political Catholicism. In sharp contrast to anti-democratic and centralist universalism were the variants of free corporatism, represented by the Catholic socialists in the social-democratic concept of economic democracy and by the solidarists.

=== Relationship to Fascism and Nazism ===
According to Reinhold Knoll (2005), Spann never identified himself as a fascist or Nazi. He had become the “central figure” of a “new Catholic”, “conservative right” in Germany and Austria. According to Knoll, Spann had the ambition to become the “ideologue of a 'new Germany'” but was clearly inferior to his Nazi opponent Alfred Rosenberg. Helmut Woll also sees Spann in contrast to German Nazism. Woll argues that Spann "proclaimed a more than hundred-year-old Counter-Reformation through his universalism." According to Woll, Spann “essentially only aimed against atheistic individualism, not against Christianity”. Spann used the term universalism in the sense Aristotle understood: "The whole is greater than the sum of its parts." In contrast, according to Alfred Rosenberg, Nazism was directed against the individual in general and demanded the "primacy of race" - for the Nazis, "race" was the universal. "Although Spann and Rosenberg used the term universalism," Woll states, "they mean completely different things by it."

=== Influence in Austria ===
Jonas Hagedorn (2016) judges that Spann's apprenticeship intellectually paved the way for the Austrian Dollfuss-Schuschnigg government. Spann's universalism was also able to have a certain influence on German political Catholicism. In particular, the Catholic Academic Association declared Spann's teaching to be its doctrine. According to Walter Euchner et al. (2000), Spann had "considerable influence [sic!]" on Catholicism in German-speaking countries. Robert Kriechbaumer states in a similar way (2005) that Spann became “the eloquent and influential prophet of political neo-romanticism” in Austria’s First Republic, whose corporate-authoritarian, anti-liberal ideas influenced academic youth “to a considerable extent.” Stefan Breuer (1995) describes Spann as the "leader of the Catholic Right". Emmerich Tálos (2013) attests Spann to have “theoretically underpinned the criticism of the parliamentary representative system and of the parties as well as the efforts made in connection with the economic crisis to find an authoritarian solution for mediating state and social interests.” Universalism has not been implemented in Austria in terms of realpolitik, but has "contributed significantly" to the content of the estate discussion. In this way, Spann had an indirect influence on the Home Guard and, via Ignaz Seipel, on the Christian Social Party.

From 1929, Spann was close to the Home Guard, especially the Styrian Homeland Security Service, with whose leader Walter Pfrimer he also appeared at events and whose publishing house published his essay Die Irrungen des Marxismus. Spann's close associate Walter Heinrich became head of the federal organization of the Austrian Home Guard in 1930 and is considered the author of the Korneuburg Oath. Hans Riehl (social scientist), another student of Spann, also served as propaganda director for the federal association. Heinrich founded the Comradeship Association for national and socio-political education (KB), through which Spann's teachings decisively shaped the political movement of the Sudeten Germans before 1938. Its members were also known as the Spannkreis.

Spann, especially in his book The True State, developed the idea of an authoritarian and largely static organization of a corporate society directed against parliamentary democracy and the labor movement alike. The estates, which were conceived as compulsory professional organizations, were given extensive state sovereign rights and the workers were subject to the rule of the "business leaders". His positions mediated “between the intellectual tradition of socially conservative ideologies and the practice of fascist mass movements. … The conglomerate of clerico-romantic and German-nationalist ideologemes,” according to historian Willibald Holzer, “as it was based on Spann’s recourse to both romantic-clerical and national-imperialist traditions, is essential to Spann’s turn to Italian fascism, the German National Socialists, and all three Austrian fascisms favored and its integrative function within the Austrian right made possible in the first place." and closely tied to the traditions of political Catholicism from Seipel to Dollfuss.

In relation to his biography, the historian and ÖVP politician Geraldario regards Spann as an atypical representative of the Austrian intelligentsia in the 20th century: “He had resisted being taken over by the corporate state and the Nazi dictatorship, but despite the physical injuries he suffered in the concentration camp impairments – he was considered persona non grata in the Second Republic. This manifests an atypical career: Spann managed to be unpopular in three consecutive different phases of Austrian politics."

=== Influence in Slovakia ===
Spann's corporative-authoritarian doctrine also exerted a "great attraction" on the clerical-nationalist party wing of the Ludak party in Slovakia. It was initially taken over by the radical Catholic circle of intellectuals around the magazine Nástup (“The Inauguration”) and then also represented by the later party leader Jozef Tiso. The state ideology of the Slovak State, as formulated by party ideologist Štefan Polakovič in 1939 and 1941, was inspired to a significant extent by Spann's teachings.

== Major works ==
- Die Haupttheorien der Volkswirtschaftslehre (Types of Economic Theory, 1912; nineteenth revised edition, 1929).
- Der wahre Staat (The True State, 1921)
- Kategorienlehre (1924).
- Der Schöpfungsgang des Geistes (1928).
- Gesellschaftsphilosophie (1932).
- Naturphilosophie (1937).
- Religionsphilosophie auf geschichtlicher Grundlage (1947).
- Die Haupttheorien der Volkswirtschaftslehre (Heidelberg: Quelle & Meyer 1949).

== Bibliography ==
- Caldwell, Bruce. Hayek's Challenge: An Intellectual Biography of F.A. Hayek. The University of Chicago Press. 2004
- Giovanni Franchi (a cura di), Othmar Spann. La scienza dell'intero, Edizioni Nuova Cultura, Roma 2012. ISBN 9788861348042
- Sebastian Maaß, Dritter Weg und wahrer Staat. Othmar Spann - Ideengeber der Konservativen Revolution. Regin-Verlag, Kiel, 2010.
