= Liptaň Tragedy =

Liptaň Tragedy (Czech: Liptaňská tragédie) is an event that occurred in Liptaň in Czechoslovakia on 22 September 1938 when Radicalized German villagers attacked the gendarmerie station and murdered all six Czech members of the State Defense Guard.

== Event ==
The local events started when men of the Sudeten German Free Corps (Sudetendeutsches Freikorps) in nearby towns gained control over police stations Město Albrechtice (Olbersdorf) and Zlaté Hory (Zuckmantel), therefore cutting both main routes from Liptáň with the rest of the Czech inland. Later in the evening, local Freikorps members opened a secret stash of German army rifles and submachine guns that had been previously smuggled across the border and stored within a railway station.

Then a mob of 150–180 men, most of them armed, proceeded towards the local gendarme station. The mob leaders compelled Chief Constable Rudolf Mokrý to call to the nearby station in Mokrá where gendarmes already had surrendered. Gaining information that several nearby stations were handed over without any violence and with Czechoslovak official mostly being allowed to withdraw inland, still under orders preventing use of firearms and facing armed mobs, the station chief agreed to surrender the station. The Germans took the officers' firearms and held them captive inside the building while someone was sent to procure a car that could be used to transport the captives (it is unknown whether inland or to Germany).

Shortly after the officers within the station building were disarmed, two gendarme officers driving on a motorcycle arrived to town. As they were nearing the station a firefight erupted. In the general confusion, the Germans started shooting not only at the officers but also at each other; it is not known whether the officers managed to fire their weapons. The officers used the chaos and attempted to reach the station not knowing that it was already fully under German control. Both gendarme officers Inocenc Dostál and Vítězslav Hofírek were shot dead immediately after entering the station. Outside of the station, most of the mob dispersed, leaving behind three dead bodies and several angry Freikorps members. The remaining disarmed gendarme officers Chief Constable Rudolf Mokrý, Constable Vilém Leher and Constable Ludvík Svoboda were dragged outside of the station and lynched to death.Constable František Čech, station's messenger, was also lynched to death either with the three other officers or elsewhere in the town's vicinity.

The gendarme officers' bodies were transported over the border to the German town Leobschütz where they were buried in an unmarked mass grave. Their fate remained unknown until the March 1939 Nazi German takeover of the remainder of Czechoslovakia, when Nazi German authorities acknowledged their deaths.

The victims' bodies were later exhumed and ceremonially buried in Czechoslovakia. The perpetrators were never captured (although having been identified, as with Alfred Selig), however, three other Germans that took part in the attack were arrested, tried and executed by hanging in October 1946.

Since then the murdered officers have been commemorated in Liptaň with a statue and signs explaining the events, as well as with different activities of remembrance, including reenactment.
