= Sudetendeutsches Freikorps =

Nazi paramilitary for Czechoslovak border operations

Sudeten German Free Corps
- German: Sudetendeutsches Freikorps
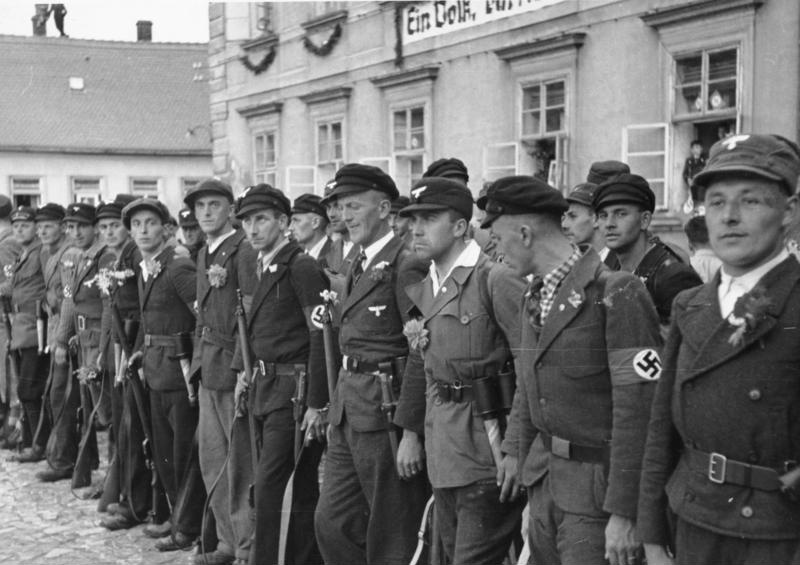
- Sudetendeutsches Freikorps members
- Active: 1938 to 1939
- Country: Germany; Czechoslovakia
- Allegiance: Adolf Hitler
- Type: Paramilitary organization
- Role: Break-up of Czechoslovakia
- Engagements: Sudeten German uprising, Undeclared German–Czechoslovak war

Commanders
- De facto commander: Friedrich Köchling
- Formal commander: Konrad Henlein
- Vice-commander: Karl Hermann Frank
- Chief of staff: Anton Pfrogner

The Sudetendeutsches Freikorps (SFK) (Sudeten German Free Corps, also known as the Freikorps Sudetenland, Freikorps Henlein and Sudetendeutsche Legion) was a paramilitary organization founded on 17 September 1938 in Germany on direct order of Adolf Hitler. The organization was composed mainly of ethnic German citizens of Czechoslovakia with pro-Nazi sympathies who were sheltered, trained and equipped by the German army and who conducted cross-border terrorist operations into Czechoslovak territory from 1938 to 1939. They played a role in destabilizing Czechoslovakia and facilitating the annexation of the Sudetenland into the Third Reich under Nazi Germany.

The Sudetendeutsches Freikorps was formed largely from members of the Freiwilliger Schutzdienst, also known as Ordnersgruppe, an organization established by the Sudeten German Party in Czechoslovakia unofficially in 1933 and officially on 17 May 1938, following the example of the Sturmabteilung, the original paramilitary wing of the German Nazi Party. Officially registered as a promoter organization, the Freiwilliger Schutzdienst was proscribed on 16 September 1938 by the Czechoslovak authorities due to its implication in many criminal and terrorist activities. Many of its members as well as leadership, wanted for arrest by Czechoslovak authorities, had moved to Germany where they became the basis of the Sudetendeutsches Freikorps, conducting the Freikorps' first cross-border raids into Czechoslovakia only a few hours after its official establishment. Due to the smooth transition between the two organizations, similar membership, Nazi Germany's sponsorship and application of the same tactic of cross-border raids, some authors often do not particularly distinguish between the actions of Ordner (i.e. up to 16 September 1938) and Freikorps (i.e. from 17 September 1938).

Relying on the Convention for the Definition of Aggression, Czechoslovak president Edvard Beneš and the government-in-exile later regarded 17 September 1938, the day of establishment of the Sudetendeutsches Freikorps and beginning of its cross-border raids, as the beginning of the undeclared German–Czechoslovak war. This understanding has been confirmed in 1997 by the Czech Constitutional Court. Meanwhile, Nazi Germany formally declared that Czech captives would be considered prisoners of war from 23 September 1938 onwards.

== Background ==
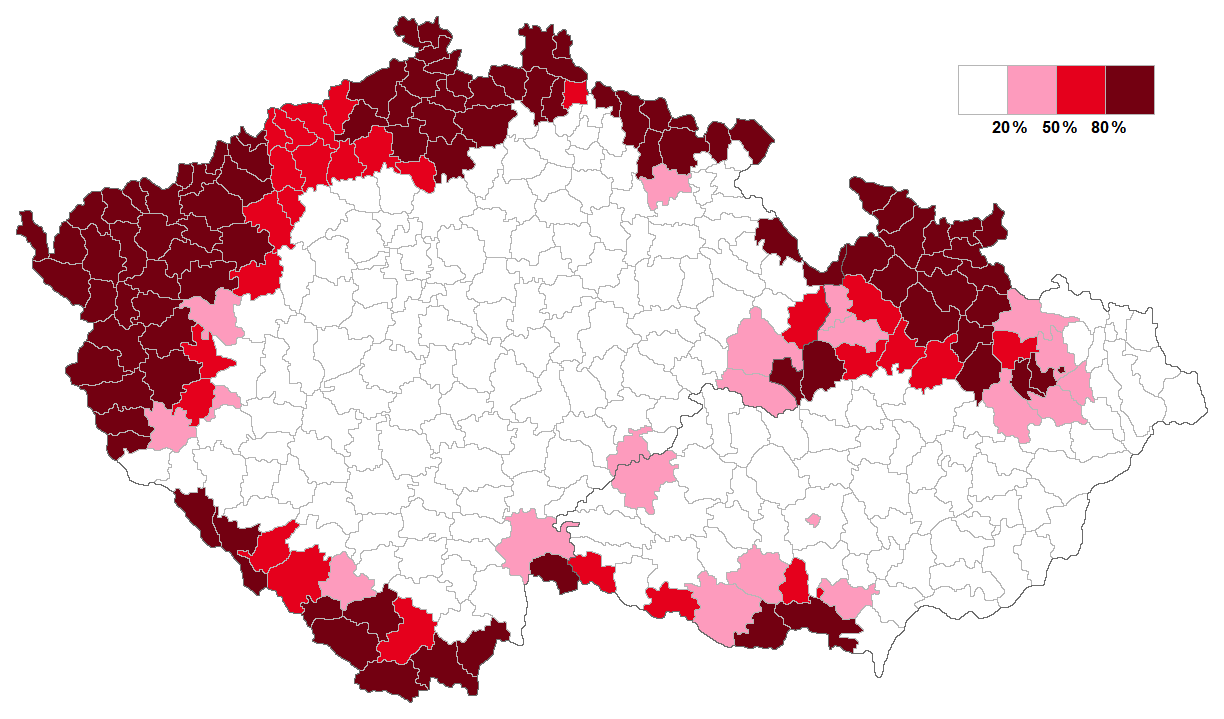
Czech districts with an ethnic German population in 1934 of 20% or more (pink), 50% or more (red), and 80% or more (dark red) in 1935

From 1918 to 1938, after the breakup of the Austro-Hungarian Empire, more than three million ethnic Germans lived in the Czech part of the newly created state of Czechoslovakia.

In 1933, as Adolf Hitler assumed power in Germany, Sudeten German pro-Nazi leader Konrad Henlein founded Sudeten German Party (SdP), the local branch of the Nazi Party for the Sudetenland. By 1935, the SdP was the second largest political party in Czechoslovakia. Shortly after the Anschluss of Austria to Germany, Henlein met with Hitler in Berlin on 28 March 1938, where he was instructed to raise demands unacceptable to the Czechoslovak government of president Edvard Beneš. On 24 April, the SdP issued a series of demands upon the government of Czechoslovakia, known as the Carlsbad Program. Among the demands, Henlein demanded autonomy for Germans living in Czechoslovakia. The Czechoslovak government responded by saying that it was willing to provide more minority rights to the German minority but it refused to grant them autonomy.

By June 1938, the party had over 1.3 million members, i.e. 40.6% of the ethnic Germans from Czechoslovakia (many of whom had fled to Germany), 40% of them women. During the last free democratic elections before the German occupation of Czechoslovakia, the May 1938 communal elections, the party received 88% of ethnic German votes, taking over control of most municipal governments in the Czech borderland. The country's membership made it one of the largest fascist parties in Europe at the time.

The first major crisis took place in May 1938 after a partial Czechoslovak army mobilization. Activities of pro-Nazi ethnic Germans in the area led to a large flight of ethnic-Czech civilians and especially Jews. Hitler's escalating threats to attack Czechoslovakia led to full mobilization on 22 September 1938. Many ethnic Germans refused to follow the Czechoslovak army mobilization order and either moved across the border to Germany and joined the Freikorps, continuing to raid cross-border from there, or established Grün Freikorps units operating from Czechoslovak forests, receiving arms and equipment from Germany, and continuing raids against Czechoslovak authorities, Jews and Czechs, until the German occupation of the Czechoslovak border areas following the Munich Agreement.

== Ordnersgruppe, Freiwilliger Schutzdienst ==
Freiwilliger Schutzdienst
- German: Ordnersgruppe
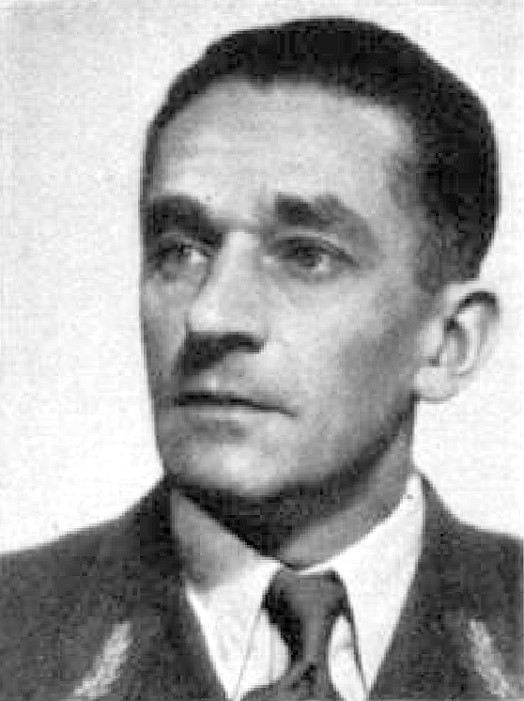
- Karl Hermann Frank, the FS's vice-Führer who received orders directly from Hitler
- Active: 17 May 1938 to 16 September 1938
- Country: Czechoslovakia
- Allegiance: Germany
- Type: Terrorist organization
- Role: Break-up of Czechoslovakia

Commanders
- Führer: Konrad Henlein
- Vice-Führer: Karl Hermann Frank
- Secretary: Fritz Köllner
- Chief of staff: Willi Brandner

=== Founding of the organization ===
Immediately after establishing the Sudetendeutsche Heimatfront (later Sudeten German Party, SdP) in 1933, the party started forming its informal Ordnungsdienst (Order Service; its members were called in German Ordner (both singular and plural)) which was officially supposed to preserve order at meetings and assemblies of the party and protect it against its political enemies. In reality, however, these were from the beginning attack squads with potentially terrorist assignments, following the example of the Sturmabteilung (a.k.a. "Brownshirts" or "Storm Troopers"), the original paramilitary wing of the German Nazi Party. More systematic build-up of the paramilitary wing started before the 1935 elections, when the SdP's leadership decided that each local SdP organization should establish its own squad of Ordner.

On 14 May 1938, the Ordnersgruppe was formally transformed into new official organization called the Freiwilliger Schutzdienst (FS), openly built up on the model of the Nazi Sturmabteilung. SdP's chief Konrad Henlein was the Schutzdienst's leader, Fritz Köllner became its secretary and Willi Brandner it chief of staff, also responsible for building up of squad groups. By 17 May 1938, the date of the organization's official registration, the Schutzdienst had over 15,000 members.

The Schutzdienst started a wide recruitment program in June 1938. Its members were divided into three categories:

- Category A: The most trusted and physically capable members that were supposed to carry out the duty of guardians of "inner purity" of the SdP. Category A was composed of the so-called "surveillance departments" and was directly subordinate to the SdP. Apart from functions within the organization, its members were also collecting information on political opponents and conducting military espionage.
- Category B: Wider selection of members. Its members were trained for propaganda activities and for conducting terrorist and sabotage assaults.
- Category C: Mostly older members of FS, mainly former soldiers with World War I front line experience. Their main task was providing training to the B category members as well as being the FS's reserve force.

FS squads were being built up as militias with local, district and regional formations and central staff. FS further created special squads: communication, medical and rear. The FS's squad leaders were trained directly by the Nazi Sturmabteilung in Germany.

The FS became instrumental for the psychological warfare of the operation Case Green, smuggling weapons through "green border" from Germany, conducting various provocations of Czechoslovak armed forces and provocations on the border with Germany.

=== Attempted putsch ===
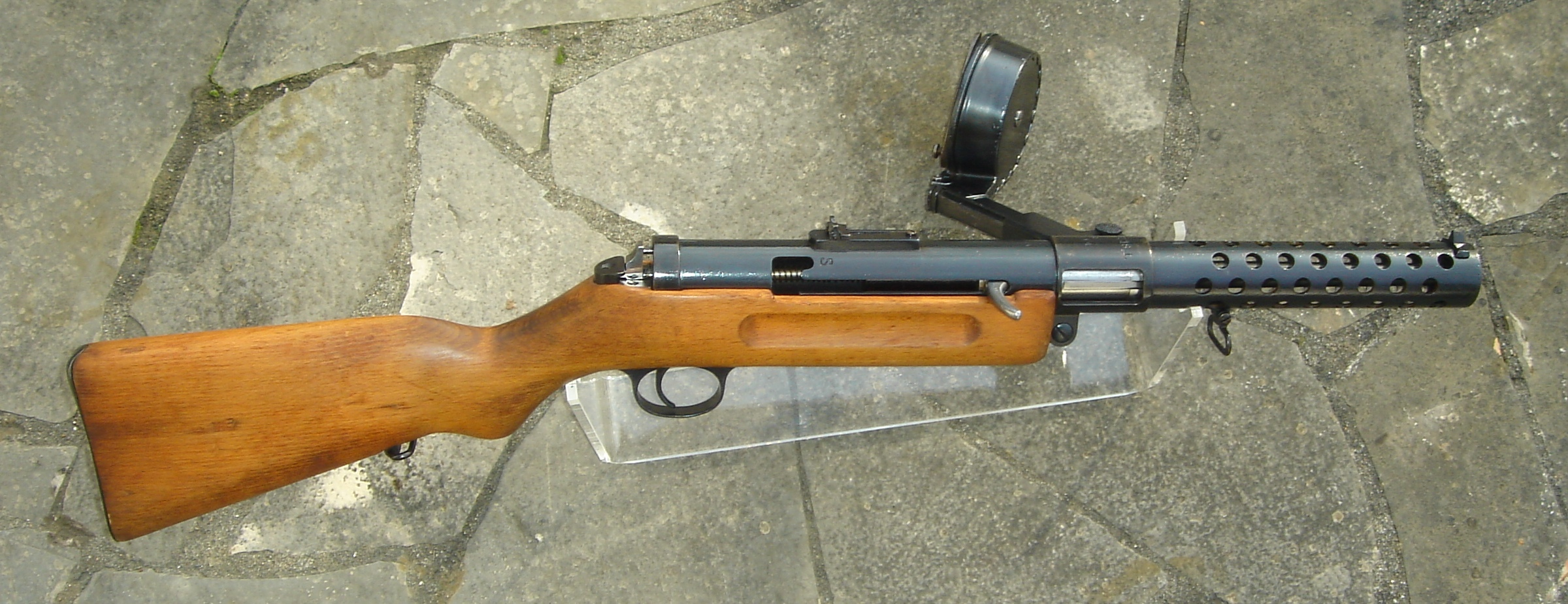
Bergmann MP18. Ordner were supplied with many sub-machineguns provided by, and smuggled from, Germany

Sudeten German Party Putsch
- Part of German occupation of Czechoslovakia
Date	10–15 September 1938
Location	Czechoslovak borderlands
Result	Putsch quashed, SdP and SF banned and dissolved

Belligerents
Sudeten German Party: Freiwilliger Schutzdienst	Czechoslovakia

Commanders and leaders
Konrad Henlein; Karl Hermann Frank; Fritz Köllner; Willi Brandner	(Czechoslovakia) Milan Hodža

Casualties and losses
10 dead, over dozen wounded	over 23 dead, over 60 wounded
- Violence led a large number of Jews, Czechs and anti-fascist Germans to flee from the borderlands further to inland Czechoslovakia. Following the restoration of order by Czechoslovak authorities, tens of thousands of pro-Nazi ethnic Germans fled to Germany to avoid either arrest or mobilization into the Czechoslovak army.

The German Nazi Party was convening its 10th congress between 5 and 12 September 1938 in Nuremberg, where it was expected that Hitler would make clear his further plans as regards Czechoslovakia. FS squads were kept in a state of high alert, ready to conduct any orders that may come from "higher up". On 10 September 1938, all FS district headquarters received orders to start large scale demonstrations, which escalated to a number of members of Czechoslovak law enforcement being wounded, as well as FS members in numerous cities already the next day. FS Vice-Führer Karl Hermann Frank was in direct contact with Hitler, receiving instructions for the following days.

Immediately after the highly anticipated Hitler's final speech on 12 September 1938, in which Hitler declared his intention to take care of German interests "under any circumstances" and to "prevent the creation of a second Palestine in the heart of Europe where the poor Arabs are defenseless and abandoned, while Germans in Czechoslovakia are not defenseless, nor abandoned", the FS initiated widespread violence in the whole borderland. In Cheb alone, K. H. Frank's hometown, ethnic-German mob plundered 38 Czech and Jewish shops. Other main targets included buildings of the German Social Democratic Party and Czechoslovak authorities, including schools. The FS conducted over 70 armed assaults against Czechoslovak authorities and assaulted selected Czechs and ethnic German anti-fascists. Czechoslovak law enforcement was meanwhile ordered not to intervene in order not to further fuel up Hitler's propaganda.

As it became clear that the SdP was attempting to push the Czechoslovak authorities out of the towns in the borderland and replace them with its own governance, and with the rising death toll that included, inter alia, the murder of four gendarmes by the FS in Habartov, the Czechoslovak government responded by declaring martial law in the thirteen worst struck districts and by dispatching the military. Major assaults on Czechoslovak law enforcement as well as the military continued throughout 14 September 1938, with the last one taking place on 15 September in Bublava. Altogether, the violence led to 13 dead and numerous injuries on 12–13 September and culminated with 23 dead (13 Czechoslovak authorities personnel, 10 ethnic Germans) and 75 seriously wounded (of those 14 ethnic Germans) on 14 September. However, the attempted putsch was thwarted.

On 14 September 1938, the SdP's leadership ran across the border to Selb, Germany, where K. H. Frank unsuccessfully demanded immediate military intervention from Hitler. The leadership's flight had chilling effect on the FS members, especially those that had taken part in the violence and now feared criminal prosecution. On 15 September 1938, German radio broadcast a speech by Henlein, who was purportedly speaking live from Aš in Czechoslovakia. By this time, the SdP's flight to Germany had become public knowledge and according to the then German ambassador in Prague, instead of stimulating SdP's members to further actions, it led to a serious rift in its ranks.

On 16 September 1938, Czechoslovak authorities banned and dissolved the SdP as well as the FS. Many of its functionaries as well as members that were wanted for arrest in connection with the preceding violence fled to Germany, while a number of town mayors elected for the SdP exhorted FS members to keep calm and expressed their support to the commanders of Gendarme stations situated in their towns.

Sudeten German Party Putsch

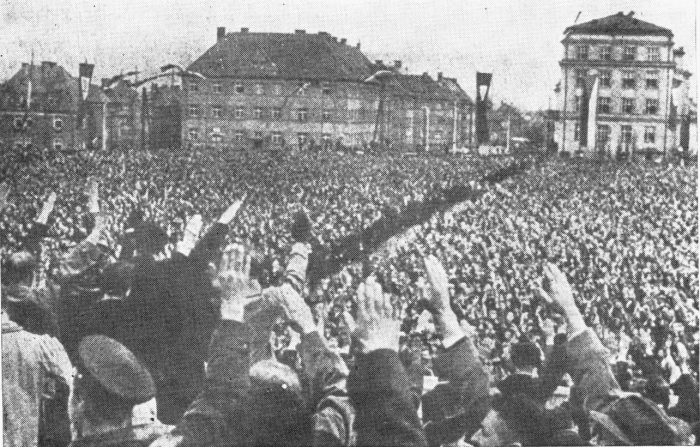
SdP's assembly on 1 May 1938 in Liberec

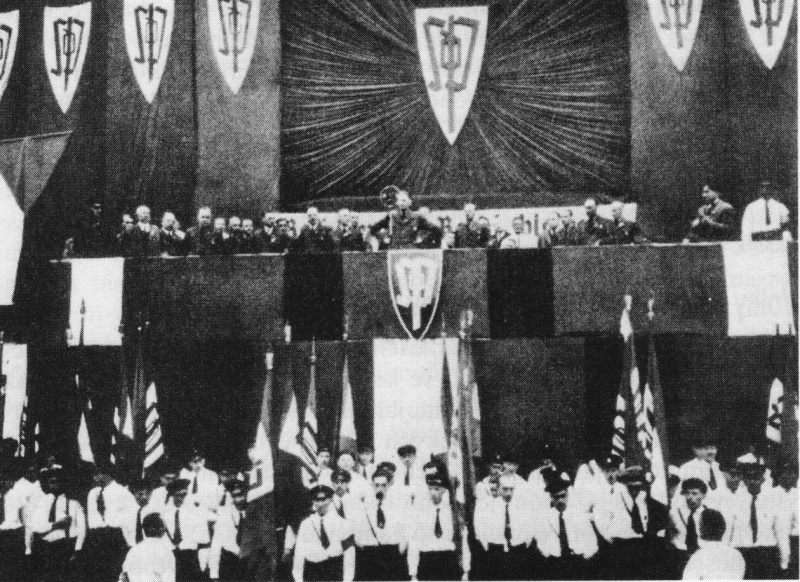
K. H. Frank speaking during the 1938 SdP congress

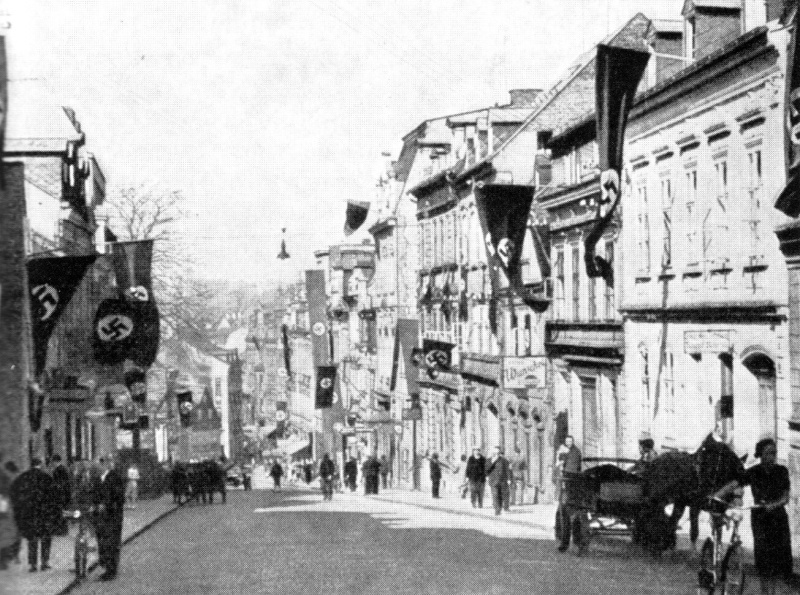
Main street in Aš, where the SdP's leadership met on 13 September 1938 before fleeing to Germany

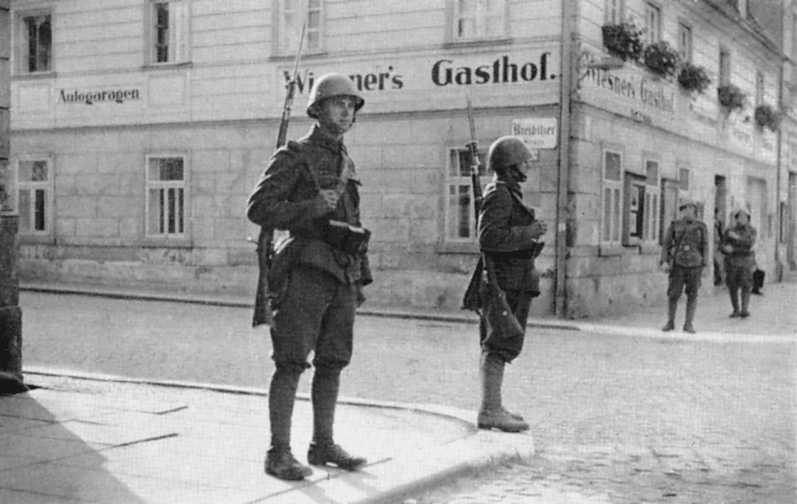
Czechoslovak soldiers patrolling in Česká Lípa

Notable engagements
Date	Place	Summary	Details
11–14 September 1938	Cheb	Major unrest involving up to 4,000 members of SdP	Cheb, a district town and SdP stronghold, faces major unrest from 11 September 1938 as the SdP tries to disrupt an assembly of the Czechoslovak automobile association in the town's theater, leading to clashes with police that result in 17 lightly wounded policemen and police officer Václav Brůžek suffering a severe injury. On 12 September 1938, immediately after the end of Hitler's Nuremberg speech, a mob of up to 4,000 SdP members and supporters rush into the streets, sacking 38 Jewish and Czech shops and lynching Jews and Czechs. Altogether 70 members of the Gendarmerie and 30 State Police officers try to restore order, using only batons as they are under orders preventing use of firearms apart from necessary self defense. On 13 September the mob in the streets number some 2,000 people, but now armed with knives, sticks and stones and also some firearms. The mob try to push the police cordon out of the main square. Several shots are fired in both directions, leading to the death of one German while police officers Lodr, Anděl and Čmelák suffer injuries in the scuffle. Thereafter the mob disperses. Later during the day reinforcements of 60 policemen and an army unit including tanks and infantry fighting vehicles arrive, fully restoring order in the town. On 14 September, police move to conduct a search of a local hotel on suspicion that it is being used to store illegal firearms for Ordner. As police try to breach the entrance, several perpetrators open fire from hotel windows from rifles, pistols and at least one machine gun. Police officer Jan Klenner is mortally wounded. Railway worker Emmanuel Bláha, who happens to be nearby, attempts first to help Klenner, then to return fire with a policeman's rifle, but is also shot dead. Another civilian, Václav Tejček, tries to help the two but is also shot dead. Immense gunfire from hotel windows hits and kills three uninvolved German civilians in the street. After dusk, police use many hand grenades and then enter the building, which is already mostly empty. The only person caught is later released as there is no evidence tying him to the gunfire; according to his testimony a group of around 10 men armed mostly with pistols and two machineguns are responsible for the shootout.
13 September 1938	Habartov	The local SdP carries out a lawful demonstration in the streets. Armed Ordner use mobs to seize the post office including a telephone switchboard and later also the police station, killing four members of Czechoslovak security forces in the process.	In the morning after Hitler's Nuremberg speech, the local SdP carries out an initially lawful demonstration in the streets after calling for further 300 SdP members from the nearby town of Doupov to join. Armed Ordner first seize the post office with its telephone switchboard and take its workers as well as one municipal policemen captive. A German mob, many of them armed, surround the police station and demand the surrender of policemen. The mob force their way into the building where they corner two armed policemen in each of two different rooms. The policemen, under orders not to use firearms, refuse to surrender. The Germans try to wrestle the firearms from the policemen's hands. Failing to do that, the Germans start shooting, killing Sergeant Major Jan Koukol. The rest of the policemen return fire, killing two attackers and wounding another. Most Germans flee from the station. The three surviving policemen, one of them with his hand wounded by a gunshot and the two others wounded in the face with glass shards, fortify the station while the Germans take positions in the houses around the station (which is situated on the ground floor of a building that is used also as German-language primary school) and start a continuous barrage of fire into the station's windows. Two Ordner are killed and two others seriously wounded during first two hours of shootout, leading the Germans to call for more reinforcements against the three policemen whose telephone line was cut. The Germans then try to flood the station using a firefighting vehicle, but are again driven away by police gunfire. The Germans then take one of the policemen's wife, put a noose on her neck and send her half-naked in front of the station while holding the other end of the noose, demanding immediate surrender under threat of killing her. The policemen surrender. Constable Matěj Příbek is beaten and locked in nearby house. Constable Jan Paulus is beaten senseless and then twice again after regaining consciousness. Constable Antonín Křepela, after seeing the mob attack on Paulus, tries to run away and is shot and wounded. Lying on the ground, the Germans beat him to death with clubs and pickaxes. Having lost all contact, county police HQ sends a bus with 15 policemen to Habartov at 1 pm. Immediately after stopping at the town square in front of the police station, policemen are subjected to a barrage of fire from Germans hidden in windows in houses overlooking the square. Corporal Stanislav Roubal is shot in the head and killed, Constable Vavřinec Hyka is shot in the head and wounded. Policemen try to get into the station, which is however also occupied by Ordner who open fire as they try to get in. Policemen then scramble towards a house nearby while Sergeant Vladimír Černý is shot in the chest and killed. Eleven policemen manage to get into a house opposite to the station, from which they start firing at the Ordner. At 2 pm, further police reinforcements arrive and the Ordner mostly run away towards the border with Germany. Seven perpetrators are caught and arrested, but due to developments in the following weeks they escape justice. Court proceedings continue only after World War II, leading to ten perpetrators receiving the death penalty, six of which are carried out.
13 September 1938	Stříbrná	SdP attempt to take over police station thwarted.	A German mob assembles in front of the police station; local SdP leaders demand the immediate surrender of all security forces. Station chief Sergeant Major František Novák makes it clear that police will answer any violence with deadly force; the crowd disperses.
13 September 1938	Bublava	A mob from Germany proper with armed members of the SdP take over the town, killing three members of Czechoslovak security forces and taking 45 captives to Germany.	In the morning after Hitler's Nuremberg speech, an anti-Nazi ethnic German informs Czechoslovak police that a large crowd is gathering in Germany with the aim of forcing their way into the town that lies directly on the border. Around midday, a large crowd from Germany advances towards the Czechoslovak customs house, part of which is used for official purposes and part including flats where customs officers' families live. Meanwhile, Ordner cut the telephone line leading to the customs house. Seven customs officers inside are under strict orders preventing them from shooting in the direction of the German border and decide to simply lock the doors and wait. SdP members break through the doors and the mob floods the customs house. Customs officers decide to surrender their firearms while Germans loot the offices as well as private flats. At about 1 pm the crowd moves on in the direction of the town center and police station, which is about 1 km away from the customs house. After a brief standoff, two buses carrying reinforcements with 14 policemen and several soldiers arrive. While the situation around the police station de-escalates, one bus is sent with three policemen to the customs house. While trying to negotiate the release of customs officials and their family members, policemen are ambushed by Germans shooting from behind concrete barrier on the border. Constable Josef Falber is shot in the stomach and bleeds to death. Constable Bohuslav Kazda is shot in the head close to the ear and loses consciousness. Superintendent Nový returns fire and suffers a gunshot wound to the hand and leg. Meanwhile on the ground, the mob attacks him. German customs officers cross the border and prevent Nový from being beaten to death. After hearing gunfire, three policemen and four customs officers (whose families are held hostage) drive a second bus towards the customs house. Being ambushed by heavy gunfire, they disembark about 100 meters from the target. Sergeant Major Hrádek, the police station chief leading the group, is shot in the leg. Severely outnumbered and with orders preventing them from returning fire in the direction of Germany proper, they load the wounded Nový and Kazda and drive back to the police station. Ordner send negotiators to the police station. The Germans agree to free the customs officers and their wives and children. The family members drive further inland to Czechoslovakia and the freed customs officers reinforce the police station. Ordner cut the telephone line to the station and start building barricades around the police station. The police chief burns all secret files; shortly thereafter the mob breaks through the doors and all 45 members of Czechoslovak security forces surrender with no shots being fired. Altogether 45 captive members of Czechoslovak security forces are taken to Germany proper where they are imprisoned until mid-October when they are returned to Czechoslovak authorities. After successfully dealing with the situation in Stříbrná (see elsewhere in this table), Sergeant Major František Novák is ordered to send a patrol to Bublava with which the regional HQ lost telephone contact. Novák himself leads an SDG group of two policemen, eight customs officers and two armed civilians. Unknown to them, all members of security forces in Bublava were already captured and kidnapped over the border to Germany. The SDG group reaches Bublava after dusk. While advancing towards the police station, the group walks into a well-prepared ambush. An intense firefight erupts. Superintendent Emil Martinů is wounded by the explosion of a hand grenade. Constable Vojtěch Brčák is shot in stomach and dies. Sergeant Major František Novák suffers multiple shot wounds and dies. Armed civilian František Moucha is wounded in the head. Customs superintendent Cheníček is wounded in the face. Customs officers Hájek, Kovanda and Říšský are also wounded. The SDG members scatter, regroup outside of the town and retreat back to Stříbrná. The next day, an army unit of about 120 soldiers with three LT-35 light tanks and two armoured fighting vehicles takes position on a hill overlooking the town. SdP members and Ordner cross the border towards Germany proper. The army does not enter the town, which remains in no-man's land, seldom entered either by Czechoslovak or German patrols until the German occupation.

== Freikorps ==
=== Formation ===
Czechoslovakia conducted partial mobilization in May 1938. Many young ethnic Germans did not follow the mobilization order and deserted across the border to Germany instead. Thousands more fled as they were receiving mobilization orders after 12 September 1938. The Wehrmacht first initiated a plan of including Czechoslovak ethnic Germans of 20–35 years of age, who had previously undergone military training in the Czechoslovak army, into its own ranks. This was however abandoned as soon as Hitler ordered the establishment of the Sudetendeutsches Freikorps on 17 September 1938. Konrad Henlein was formally named the Freikorps' commanding officer, with the Wehrmacht's liaison officer Lieutenant Colonel Friedrich Köchling, previously liaison officer in the Hitler Youth, being the Freikorps' de facto commander. The official purpose of the Freikorps, as stated in a telegram to the Oberkommando der Wehrmacht, was the "protection of Sudeten Germans and maintaining further unrest and armed clashes". The Wehrmacht was further instructed to conceal its cooperation with the Freikorps for "political reasons".

The Freikorps' ranks were filling up rather fast. It had 10,000–15,000 members by 20 September 1938, 26,000 members by 22 September 1938, with many more deserters coming after the general Czechoslovak mobilization that took place on 23 September 1938 and reaching 41,000 by 2 October 1938. Apart from Konrad Henlein, its leadership consisted of K. H. Frank (vice-commander in chief), Hans Blaschek (2nd vice-commander in chief), and Anton Pfrogner (chief of staff, previously an SdP senator). The Freikorps' headquarters was situated in a castle near Bayreuth, Germany. The Freikorps was divided into four groups alongside the whole German-Czechoslovak border. Groups were further divided into battalions and companies. Depending on the border length and local conditions, there were also sometimes "sections" as an interstage between the battalion and companies.

Group	Reorganized	Staff	Details	Position	Commanding officer
Group 1 Silesia	Group 5 Lower Silesia; Group 6 Wrocław	Wrocław	11 battalions, 6,851 members (27 September 1938)	From Racibórz to Zittau	Fritz Köllner
Group 2 Sachsen	Group 4 Sachsen	Dresden	8 battalions, 7,615 members (27 September 1938); 14 battalions, 13,264 members (1 October 1938)	From Zittau to Aš	Franz May
Group 3 Bavaria Ostmark		Bayreuth	7 battalions, 5,999 members (27 September 1938)	From Aš to Bayerisch Eisenstein	Willi Brandner
Group 4 Alps and Danuber	Group 1 Vienna; Group 2 Linz	Vienna	9 battalions, 7,798 members (29 September 1938)	From Bayerisch Eisenstein to Poysdorf	Friedrich Bürger

I swear by Almighty God, that as a fighter of the Freikorps, I am aware of my duties and I pledge steadfast allegiance to Adolf Hitler until my death. I swear I shall be brave and loyal fighter of the Freikorps, that I shall be obedient to my superiors and that I shall fulfill all of my duties.

— Freikorps Oath

Companies had 150–200 men each and were stationed in German towns and villages along the German–Czech border, each of them being fully equipped for independent cross border raids and assaults. Although the official directive allowed only ethnic Germans with Czechoslovak citizenship to be part of the Freikorps, due to the low number of officers among the deserters, their places were filled with members of the Nazi Sturmabteilung. The SA was further providing training, material support and equipment to the Freikorps. All members got regular pay for their service. Most members did not have any standardized uniform and were only distinguished by an armband with swastika. Formally, they were not part of the Wehrmacht and were prohibited from wearing Wehrmacht uniforms.

Members of the Freikorps were trained and hosted in Germany but operated across the border in Czechoslovakia attacking the infrastructure, administrative, police and military buildings and personnel, as well as the pro-government and antifascist ethnic-German civilians, Jews, Jewish owned businesses and ethnic Czech civilians. They committed assassinations, robberies and bombing attacks, retreating over the border to Germany when faced with serious opposition. They murdered more than 110 and abducted to Germany more than 2000 Czechoslovak personnel, political opponents or their family members.

==== Intelligence service ====
The Freikorps also had its own intelligence service, established on 19 September 1938 with headquarters in Selb, Germany. It was headed by Richard Lammel. The intelligence was gathering information for the reikorps as well as for Abwehr, Sicherheitsdienst (SD) and Gestapo.

==== Green Cadres ====
Many ethnic Germans who deserted after receiving the mobilization order did not go across the border to Germany, but rather established their own guerrilla units. Operating from forests in Czechoslovakia, they received the name Green Cadres, sometimes being referred to as Green Freikorps, although they were not officially incorporated as part of the German Freikorps.

==== Armaments ====
In order to conceal the level of cooperation between Wehrmacht and Freikorps, the original orders stated that the Freikorps should be armed only with weapons from warehouses of the former Austrian army. This however led to delays in arming the Freikorps and became outright impossible as regards ammunition and explosives, which were being delivered from the Wehrmacht's own supplies. The most common weapons were Mannlicher M1895 8×56 Msch., K98k 8×56 JS, pistols P08 9mm Parabellum, Bergmann machine guns and sub-machine guns, and German hand grenades. Due to the initial Czechoslovak orders forbidding the use of firearms apart from self-defense, the Freikorps also captured Czechoslovak weapons, mostly vz. 24 rifles and vz. 26 machine guns.

Meanwhile, the Green Cadres, as well as other ordners that did not join the Freikorps, were armed with a variety of hunting rifles and shotguns, pistols, as well as many sub-machine guns that had been previously supplied by Germany to the Ordnersgruppe/Freiwilliger Schutzdienst. Scoped hunting rifles in the hands of skilled Ordner proved especially deadly.

=== Czechoslovak security forces ===
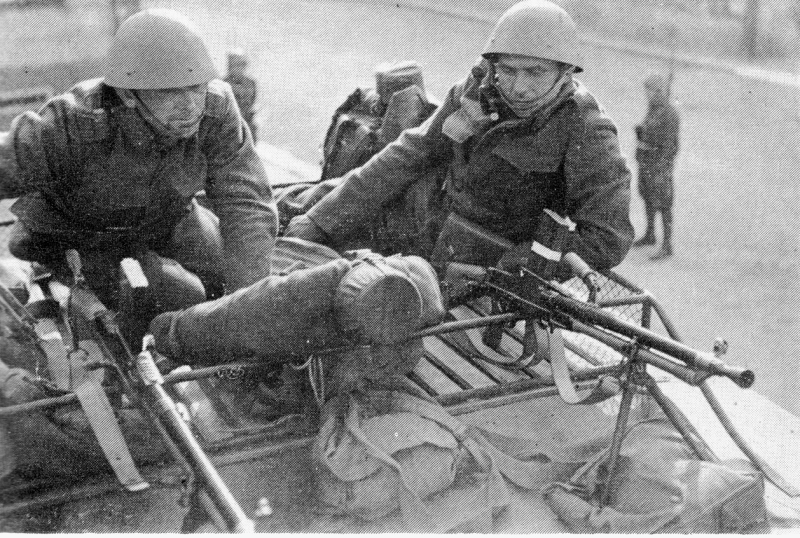
Members of the Czechoslovak Army on an armoured vehicle ready for action against the Freikorps

Following the remilitarization of the Rhineland, Czechoslovak authorities came to the conclusion that any future war would most probably begin as a sudden attack without a formal declaration of war. At the time, protection of borders was mostly vested into the authority of the Customs Administration (also called Financial Police), which was controlling the border crossings and collecting customs duties, while Gendarme officers were taking care of general law enforcement mainly within towns. This was deemed insufficient as the Customs Administration could merely enforce the custom duties and general order at border crossings, but not security along the whole border. In 1936, the State Defense Guard was established. Normally, SDG would function only in a very limited way necessary to ensure full readiness of its structure (under authority of the Ministry of Interior), with its ranks being filled up with personnel in case of emergency (under military command). Its main task was protecting the Czechoslovak border and it was supposed to be able to immediately close and defend the border for the time that would be necessary for the army to reach the attacked areas in full combat readiness. Initially, the State Defense Guard was composed of selected members of Customs Administration, Gendarme and State Police, but later its ranks were filled also with reliable civilians. In case of any unrest, its squads were further boosted by army soldiers. The State Defense Guard included also ethnic Germans that were deemed loyal to the Czechoslovak state (mostly Social Democrats and communists). The State Defense Guard thus became the main target of the Freikorps' activities.

Up to 22 September 1938 the Czechoslovak security forces were under general orders not to use their firearms apart from self-defense.

==== Republikanische Wehr ====
Republikanische Wehr was a Czechoslovak ethnic German anti-fascist militia with several thousand members. Known also as Rote Wehr (Red Defense), its members also took part in the fighting, supporting the Czechoslovak authorities. Several of its members were killed by the Nazi forces during the clashes, with thousands more being interned in concentration camps following the Munich Agreement and occupation of Czechoslovakia.

== Undeclared German–Czechoslovak War ==
Undeclared German–Czechoslovak war
- Part of the German occupation of Czechoslovakia
Date	17 September – early October 1938
Location	Czechoslovak borderlands
Result	Military: Czechoslovak Army deployment mostly restored order; Political: Appeasement through the Munich Agreement; Strategic: German occupation of Czechoslovak borderland

Belligerents
Germany: Sudeten German Freikorps; SS; SA; Abwehr; Sudeten German Party: Green Cadres	Czechoslovakia: (Czechoslovakia) Czechoslovak Army; (Czechoslovakia) State Defense Guard; (Czechoslovakia) Customs Administration, Gendarmes, State Police; (Czechoslovakia) Republikanische Wehr

Commanders and leaders
Friedrich Köchling; Konrad Henlein; Karl Hermann Frank; Fritz Köllner; Willi Brandner	(Czechoslovakia) Jan Syrový; (Czechoslovakia) Ludvík Krejčí

Casualties and losses
Freikorps: Killed: 52; Wounded: 65; Missing in action: 19; Other: Unknown	Armed forces: Killed: 110; Wounded: 50; Abducted: 2029 (including railway employees, postal workers, judges, other functionaries and their family members); Civilians: Unknown (both volunteers as well as innocent victims of Freikorps terror)
- Violence led large number of Jews, Czechs and anti-fascist Germans to flee from borderlands further to inland Czechoslovakia. Assaults continued also after Czechoslovakia ceded the borderlands to Germany. Freikorps number according to official Freikorps closing report, real tally several times higher.

The first Freikorps assaults took place during the night of 17 to 18 September 1938 in the area of Aš. Other major Freikorps assaults included, inter alia:

=== 18 September 1938 ===
Place	Assailants	Assaulted	Details	Outcome
Aš	Unknown number of Freikorps members	Several customs officers	Municipality of Aš Many Freikorps members surrounded customs house about 100 meters within Czechoslovak territory during the night of 18 to 19 September. The building was under intense fire from firearms as well as hand grenades. Czechoslovak police fired a flare to signal distress to other Czechoslovak units and barricaded themselves. They did not return fire outside of the building in order to prevent any possible accusation of Czechoslovak forces shooting across the border to Germany.	2 customs officers seriously wounded
Bílá Voda	Unknown number of Freikorps members	Several Gendarme officers, several customs officers	Jeseník District The customs house in Bílá Voda, which was located directly on the Czech–German border, had been targeted by gun fire from Germany since 18 September. Its personnel was ordered not to return any fire over the border towards Germany and was allowed to retreat only in the afternoon of 22 September, when it joined the local SDG squad in its attempt to get further inland (see below).	1 Gendarme officer seriously wounded

=== 19 September 1938 ===
Place	Assailants	Assaulted	Details	Outcome
Český Heršlák	Unknown number of Freikorps members	SDG Squad	Český Krumlov District SDG Squad No. 16 dug a trench near railway line 700 meters from the German border. The Freikorps charged their position but failed, losing one. Then, the Freikorps carried out sporadic gunfire from beyond the German border with the knowledge that the SDG was under orders not to return fire into German territory. Customs officer Ladislav Krch was hit and seriously wounded. SDG Squad laid covering fire into the German territory in order to enable Krch's transport towards hospital.	1 customs officer serious wounded; 1 Freikorps member dead
Horní Malá Úpa	Unknown number of Freikorps members; SA men	Customs house: Several Gendarme officers; Several Customs officers	Trutnov District Freikorps attacked customs house in Horní Malá Úpa in the evening of 19 September 1938. The building was burned to the ground. Several wounded officers managed to retreat. Two Gendarme officers were captured and abducted to Germany. Constable Eduard Šíma was killed and his body was also abducted to Germany.	1 Gendarme officer killed; Several officers wounded; 2 Czechoslovak state officials abducted and interned in a prison in Hirschberg, Germany
Mladkov			District Ústí nad Orlicí Assault on SDG squad	
Rychnůvek	8 members of the Freikorps	SDG motorcycle messenger	Český Krumlov District The Freikorps designated the chief of local Gendarme station Jan Trněný as a "dangerous Czech" and targeted him for assassination. Trněný was supposed to be delivering messages to forward SDG Squads during the evening of 19 September. Unknown to the Freikorps, Trněný was swapped by Gendarme officer Antonín Měsíček. Měsíček was well liked by the local German population and received a warning about possible Freikorps assault, but decided to carry on with his orders. Měsíček was ambushed while on the road in the woods leading back to his home station in Rychnůvka with rifle fire and grenades. The Freikorps ran away after an SDG Squad that was nearby fired a flare when they heard the gunfire. Měsíček died in hospital the next day. Back in Germany, Freikorps member Franz Bayer was awarded 200 Reichsmarks for killing Měsíček.	Gendarme officer Antonín Měsíček killed
Starostín	Unknown number of Freikorps members	Several Customs officers	Náchod District Numerous Freikorps members surrounded the customs house in Starostín. With heavy machine gun and rifle fire, they managed to get directly to the building, but they fled after the policemen used several hand grenades.	2 customs officers seriously wounded
Znojmo	Up to 300 Freikorps members	Customs Administration	Znojmo District	
Železná Ruda			Klatovy District Assault on customs house	

=== 20 September 1938 ===
On 20 September 1938, Freikorps headquarters issued Order No. 6 signed by Henlein. According to the order, each of the groups was supposed to undertake at least 10 major raids into Czechoslovak before the morning of 21 September. The order further specified that the Freikorps was to take no regard to any aversion to the armed assaults that it had previously encountered from some ethnic German civilians. Moreover, each group was ordered to establish its own intelligence staff that would be providing information to the center in Selb. In line with the order, Freikorps attacks increased both in their frequency as well as brutality.

=== 21 September 1938 ===
Place	Assailants	Assaulted	Details	Outcome
Aš	Crowd of several hundred ethnic Germans; unknown number of Freikorps members	50 members of Czechoslovak State Police and local police force	Municipality of Aš The city of Aš borders with Germany from three sides and had only two main access roads from inland Czechoslovakia. Heads of local state authorities were advised that they would not receive further reinforcements from inland, but at the same time they were ordered to hold their posts. On the evening of 21 September, the chief of the local State Police station was summoned to a meeting held by the head of the Aš District, an ethnic German. The meeting was attended by a number of Sudeten German Party officials, who requested that the policemen lay down their firearms and hand the area over to the SdP. The chief refused and returned to the station. Soon after a mob of people broke down the main gate leading to the station's courtyard and apprehended the chief. The rest of the policemen, still being under general order not to use firearms (which were changed only the following day) surrendered. Meanwhile, the Freikorps took over the local gendarme station after they threatened to set the station ablaze with hand grenades.	50 policemen abducted and interned in a concentration camp in Germany; Police Chief abducted and imprisoned by Gestapo in Nuremberk
Bartulovice	Unknown number of Freikorps members	State Defense Guard: 10 members of Customs Administration; 5 soldiers; 2 Gendarme officers	Bruntál District About 30 Freikorps members and other local ethnic German citizens came to the customs house in Bartulovice, demanding that the SDG members hand over the building as well as their weapons. SDG chief first wanted to request orders from his superiors, however, the local post office, where the telephone switchboard was situated, had already been occupied by the Freikorps. The SDG decided to retreat from the municipality fully armed, passing a truck full of heavily armed Freikorps members from neighboring Jiříkov without incident. One customs officer remained in the building unarmed in order to formally resist occupation of the building by the Freikorps. After doing so, Freikorps he was abducted to Germany where he was interned in a concentration camp. The rest of the SDG unit continued its retreat on foot through the woods towards Holčovice, which they reached some 15 hours later and where they regrouped with ten other SDG units that had retreated under similar circumstances.	1 Czechoslovak state official abducted and interned in a concentration camp in Germany
Habartice	Unknown number of Freikorps members; SA officer leading the assault	State Defense Guard squad (18 members)	Liberec District On 20 September 1938, SDG members stationed in the border crossing station in the town Habartice observed maneuvers of German army units taking place over the border in Germany, leading them to fortify the building with sandbags and boarding. In the evening, the electricity was shut off on both sides of the border. SDG further observed that several trucks arrived at 10 PM on the German side of the border. Germans started crossing border bridge at about 3 AM on 21 September 1938 and mounted four attack waves with 30–40 men each against the SDG building, using not only firearms, but also hand grenades and dynamite. The Freikorps set off explosives which led to the collapse of the entire front wall of the building; the rest, however, remained standing. The SDG successfully defended the building, also using 36 hand grenades. The SDG squad chief had also called for reinforcements, but the soldiers had to dismount their truck after being targeted by machine gun fire over the border from Germany. The soldiers reached Habartice by crawling in ditches in the morning only after the attack had been repelled. The SDG suffered 4 seriously wounded servicemen, one of them permanently losing his eyesight. During the day after the night fight, Czechoslovak SDG members and army soldiers ostentatiously played volleyball right on the border line, some of them with bandages covering their wounds.	4 SDG members seriously wounded; 3 dead, 16 wounded assailants
Nové Vilémovice	Unknown number of Freikorps members	8 Customs officers	Jeseník District Numerous Freikorps members surrounded building of Customs Administration in Nové Vilémovice. Six officers that were inside surrendered without a shot. After this, Freikorps tried to capture another two officers that were on a patrol on the town's outskirts. A shootout ensued, in which one officer was killed while the other managed to retreat through forest. The perpetrators buried the victim's body in a secret location and then ran over the border to Germany to avoid arrest by Czechoslovak authorities. The perpetrators were not found and the court proceedings that took place in 1945 did not lead to any convictions.	1 customs officer killed
Petrovice			Petrovice Assault on customs house	
Wies (Cheb)			Cheb District Assault on customs house	

=== 22 September 1938 ===
On the night of 21 September 1938, German radio broadcast false information that Czechoslovakia agreed to cede its border areas to Germany. Next day, most ethnic German majority towns were full of German Nazi flags and Hitler portraits, while Freikorps and ethnic German mobs unleashed a wave of attacks against state authorities and non-German civilians.

On 22 September, Adolf Hitler gave orders to provide the Freikorps with German weaponry, ammunition and equipment (until that moment, Freikorps were to be armed only with weapons that Germany obtained with the Anschluss of Austria).

Czechoslovak forces' order not to use firearms except in self-defense was called off during the day.

By 24 September 1938, Freikorps conducted over 300 raids against Czechoslovak authorities.

Place	Assailants	Assaulted	Details	Outcome
Bartošovice v Orlických horách	Unknown number of Freikorps members	Customs house: 2 customs officers; 6 soldiers	District Rychnov nad Kněžnou During the night from 22 to 23 September, Freikorps attacked a customs house located in the border town Bartošovice with heavy machine gun fire and grenades. Reinforcements sent to the customs house found themselves also under heavy fire and unable to reach it. During the fourth consecutive assault wave, the custom's house roof caught fire and started collapsing. All Czechoslovak personnel managed to retreat without any loss of life.	Customs house burned to the ground.
Bernartice	Unknown number of Freikorps members	15 members of State Defense Guard; 5 Gendarme officers	Jeseník District Freikorps members ambushed 15 members of SDG and 5 gendarmes in Bernartice. The soldiers and policemen were disarmed and abducted to Germany where they were interned by local authorities in a concentration camp.	20 Czechoslovak state officials abducted and interned in a concentration camp in Germany.
Bílá Voda	Unknown number of Freikorps members	State Defense Guard squad	Jeseník District The State Defense guard house in Bílá Voda, which was located directly on the Czech–German border, had been under fire since 18 September. The personnel received orders to retreat in the afternoon of 22 September. Retreating squad was ambushed by Freikorps. A part of the squad broke through, but 15 members of SDG were captured by the ethnic German rebels, disarmed, and abducted to Germany where they were interned by local authorities in a concentration camp.	15 Czechoslovak state officials abducted and interned in a concentration camp in Germany.
Cetviny	150 Freikorps members	Gendarme officers; SDG squad	Český Krumlov District About 150 Freikorps members crossed the border river Malše and ambushed a Gendarme and SDG squad in Cetviny; the entire squad was kidnapped to Germany. Meanwhile, an SDG squad that was stationed in the vicinity heard the gunfire and sent two members to scout the situation. One of them, Václav Klimeš, was shot dead and the other seriously wounded and kidnapped to Germany. Czechoslovak forces recaptured the area after heavy fights in the following days. Considering it too vulnerable, it was then left without permanent presence.	Several Czechoslovak officials wounded and kidnapped to Germany
Černá brána near Varnsdorf	70 Freikorps members	SDG Squad	Varnsdorf An SDG squad stationed in a mountain cabin on the borderline outside of Varnsdorf was assaulted at 6AM with grenades and rifle fire. An assault on Varnsdord was undertaken later at 10 am (see below).	Two wounded soldiers
Černá Voda	ethnic German mob	2 Customs officers; 4 Gendarme officers	Jeseník District Two members of the Customs Administration were being lynched by ethnic German pro-Nazi mob in Černá Voda. When four gendarmes intervened, members of Freikorps opened fire with hunting rifles, pistols, and a light machine gun. Two members of Freikorps were wounded in the skirmish.	2 customs officers lynched; 2 Freikorps members shot and wounded
Dolní Podluží			Děčín District After 2 pm, SDG Squad No. 76 was retreating from border town Varnsdorf which was overrun by pro-Nazi German ethnic mob where was stationed also another SDG squad, whose leader collaborated with Nazis and ordered its members to surrender weapons to Freikorps. The squad stopped close to a gas pump in Dolní Podluží, with three customs officers driving to it to fill their motorbikes and others establishing a defensive position nearby. While pumping gas, they were ambushed by Freikorps. In the ensuing gunfight, customs officers Václav Kozel and Jan Teichman were shot dead and customs officer Miroslav Bernard was severely wounded. Gas pump owner Rudolf Stelzig was also shot and died. The gunfight continued until SDG Squad 77 reached the place and covered 76's retreat. Both squads retreated to Czechoslovak Army defense post in Nová Huť. After a brief rest there they then received orders to move back to Varnsdorf and recapture the lost territory, which they would successfully accomplish after numerous skirmishes in the following days. Memorial to Jan Teichman and Josef Kozel	2 customs officers killed; 1 customs officer wounded and kidnapped; 1 civilian killed
Frýdlant	Unknown number of Freikorps members	2 infantry fighting vehicles with crews	Liberec District Freikorps occupied SDG headquarters and other strategic buildings in the town Frýdlant and hung out Nazi swastika flags on many buildings in the town. The Czechoslovak army dispatched two infantry fighting vehicles with crews from Liberec. After arriving in the town, the soldiers announced that they would consider every building and person with a swastika as hostile, Freikorps packed the flags and withdrew from the town.	Freikorps attempt to take over town thwarted by mere army presence.
Heřmanice	Unknown number of Freikorps members	2 unarmed civilians	Liberec District Freikorps occupied part of municipality of Heřmanice. A local SDG unit was stationed on a hill overlooking the municipality, secured its position and did not further intervene in the municipality itself. Generally, the control over the municipality was unclear with Freikorps occupying a part lying further away from the SDG and no mutual engagement. Two civilians loyal to the Czechoslovak state, a teacher from Frýdlant school Otakar Kodeš and ethnic German communist Perner, decided to investigate the actual situation in Heřmanice. On the road leading to Heřmanice, they passed an SDG patrol that unsuccessfully recommended them not to continue into Freikorps-controlled territory. Shortly after passing the SDG patrol, they were both shot. Kodeš was shot dead, while wounded Perner was abducted to Germany. Perner, a Czechoslovak citizen, was taken to Dresden, Germany, where he was tried and convicted for treason. Perner was interned in a concentration camp, not surviving through the war. Kodeš' murderer was found, tried, sentenced and hanged in 1947.	1 civilian murdered, 1 civilian abducted, interned and murdered in a concentration camp in Germany
Heřmánkovice	60 Freikorps members	SDG squad	Náchod District Freikorps attacked the local SDG squad at 7pm. An attempt to take the town over failed.	Attempt to take town over was thwarted.
Hnanice	200 Freikorps members	Customs house: 8 customs officers; 5 soldiers	Znojmo District Freikorps attacked the customs house in Hnanice early in the morning. While their first wave failed, Czechoslovak officers retreated during the second attack without sustaining any losses. Later, two SDG squads recaptured the customs house after heavy fighting, only to lose it again on 26 September. SDG squad leader Otmar Chlup was killed in action.	1 dead, several wounded SDG members; 24 dead, 37 wounded Freikorps members
Hrádek nad Nisou	200 Freikorps members	SDG Station	Liberec District During the evening, some 200 Freikorps members started attack on a local assembly hall that was being used as an SDG station. The gunfight lasted for five hours and ended up with the Freikorps retreating.	2 dead, about 50 Freikorps members wounded
Javorník	100+ members of Freikorps	State Defense Guard: 11 members of customs administration; 2 soldiers; several Gendarme officers	Jeseník District A State Defense Guard squad was retreating further inland. When they reached the outskirts of Javorník, a group of Freikorps members offered them safe passage. While passing through the town, the squad was ambushed. The Czechoslovak servicemen were disarmed and abducted to Germany where they were interned by local authorities in the concentration camp in Patschkau (apart from two who were released and one who escaped during transport). Apart from soldiers, the Freikorps also abducted a district court judge and his clerk, who were taken to the concentration camp in Patschkau.	15 Czechoslovak state officials abducted and interned in a concentration camp in Germany.
Libná (town no longer exists); Zdoňov; Horní Adršpach	Unknown number of Freikorps members	SDG	Náchod District Freikorps attacked the customs house in the border town of Libná. SDG squad leader Robert Jokl was wounded and abducted to Germany, while the rest of the squad was forced to retreat further inland. Being severely outnumbered, other SDG squads were forced to retreat from the nearby municipalities of Zdoňov and Horní Adršpach. All units met at the hamlet Krčmov, where they established a new point of defense. Later in the evening SDG was reinforced by 9th Company of 48th Infantry Regiment with two armored vehicles and took control of all three towns; while retreating to Germany, the Freikorps set the customs house in Libná on fire, burning it to the ground. Czechoslovak units in the area faced further attacks until being ordered to retreat on 28 September.	Several wounded; SDG officer wounded and abducted to Germany; Customs house burned to the ground
Liptaň	150–180 ethnic Germans; Unknown number of Freikorps members	6 Gendarme officers	Bruntál District Freikorps successfully gained control over police stations in the nearby towns of Albrechtice and Zlaté Hory, cutting both main routes from Liptáň with the rest of the Czech inland. Later in the evening, local Freikorps members opened a secret stash of German army rifles and submachine guns that had been previously smuggled across the border and stored within a railway station. A mob of 150–180 men, most of them armed, proceeded towards the local gendarme station. Mob leaders forced Chief Constable Rudolf Mokrý to call the nearby station in Mokrá where gendarmes already surrendered. Gaining information that several nearby stations were handed over without any violence with Czechoslovak official mostly being allowed to withdraw inland, still under orders preventing use of firearms and facing an armed mob, the station chief agreed to surrender the station. Germans took the officers' firearms and held them captive inside the building while someone was sent to procure a car that could be used to transport the captives (it is unknown whether inland or to Germany). Shortly after the officers within the station building were disarmed, two gendarme officers driving on a motorcycle arrived to town. As they were nearing the station, a firefight erupted. In general confusion, Germans started shooting not only at the officers, but also at each other; it is not known whether the officers managed to fire their weapons. The officers used the chaos and attempted to reach the station, not knowing that it was already fully under German control. Both gendarme officers Inocenc Dostál and Vítězslav Hofírek were shot dead immediately after entering the station. Outside of the station, most of the mob dispersed, leaving behind three dead bodies and several angry Freikorps members. The remaining disarmed gendarme officers Chief Constable Rudolf Mokrý, Constable Vilém Leher and Constable Ludvík Svoboda were dragged outside of the station and lynched. Constable František Čech, the station's messenger, was also lynched either with the three other officers or elsewhere in the town's vicinity. Gendarme officers' bodies were transported over the border to the German town Lischwitz where they were buried in an unmarked mass grave. Their fate remained unknown until March 1939 German invasion of the remainder of Czechoslovakia, when German authorities acknowledged their deaths. The victims' bodies were later exhumed and ceremonially buried in Czechoslovakia. The culprits were never captured (although having been identified), but three other Germans that took part in the attack were arrested, tried and executed by hanging in October 1946.	6 Gendarme officers lynched; 3 assailants killed
Malonty	Several dozen Freikorps members	Several gendarmes	Český Krumlov District The local Gendarme station faced heavy gunfire. All officers successfully retreated further inland.	Retreat of local Gendarmes
Mikulovice	Unknown number of Freikorps members	State Defense Guard squad	Náchod District Freikorps members ambushed an SDG squad in Mikulovice. The servicemen were disarmed and forced to wait for a train to Germany at a local train station. Meanwhile, a train going in the opposite direction was passing through the station and the soldiers hopped on it before the Freikorps could stop them. The squad got to Jeseník and engaged Freikorps in numerous firefights in the following days, arresting five.	5 Freikorps members arrested
Studánky (Vyšší Brod)	Freikorps	Customs Administration	Český Krumlov District	Takeover of customs house
Třemešná	Freikorps	Gendarme station (4 officers)	Freikorps takeover of Gendarme station and local post office. Some officers/postal workers are let go inland, some abducted to Germany. Bruntál District	Takeover of Gendarme station, abduction of several officers to Germany
Vápenná – Supíkovice – Rejvíz	Unknown number of Freikorps members	Gendarme	Jeseník District After Freikorps overran the town of Javorník (see above), local Gendarmerie supported by some of the soldiers that managed to retreat from Javorník, established a new defense posts on the line between municipalities of Vápenná – Supíkovice – Rejvíz. Gendarme officers were repeatedly attacked by Freikorps, with six ending up wounded and one killed in action in the following days.	1 Gendarme officer killed in action, 6 wounded
Varnsdorf	Several hundred Freikorps members	Several dozen SDG members	Varnsdorf Customs house on the border in Varnsdorf was attacked at 2am with several hand grenades, but attackers immediately retreated behind the border. At 10am a train led by SdP's Czechoslovak Parliament member Franz Werner and full of Freikorps members crossed the border. The Freikorps took over the train station and captured six soldiers and several railway workers. After some negotiations, SDG squads stationed in the town started retreating inland. One SDG squad leader ordered his men to surrender leading to their kidnapping to Germany; the man, who was of partially German ancestry, was later uncovered as long-term German agent. There was an army unit with three tanks stationed in nearby Rumburk, but they were ordered not to relieve SDG in Varnsdorf. At 5 pm, the army unit also left Rumburk and retreated further inland. Varnsdorf was retaken by the army the following day (see below).	Town taken over by Freikorps
Vidnava	Unknown number of Freikorps members	2 Gendarme officers; State Defense Guard squad	Jeseník District A large mob of Czechoslovak ethnic Germans that had previously left to Germany came to the border crossing in the town Vidnava carrying Nazi swastika banners. Among them were a number of Freikorps members, who used the commotion and got right to the two Gendarme officers on duty and disarmed them. The mob released the two officers and continued towards the town center. After briefing the two disarmed Gendarme officers, SDG squad leader Josef Novák contacted the town's mayor, an ethnic German Göbel, who promised that he would negotiate the return of the Gendarmes' firearms. Officers Novák and Pospíšil left SDG station and went towards the town center, now in the hands of the Freikorps. There, they were both immediately attacked and lynched. Before dying, Pospíšil tossed a hand grenade, wounding several assailants. Later that day Freikorps members also lynched an ethnic German communist Fitz. Groups of heavily armed Freikorps started taking over the whole town. Remaining SDG members and Gendarme officers decided to lay covering fire and evacuate several civilians as well as themselves towards the train station. There they fortified several wagons and drove away. Meanwhile, however, the Freikorps blocked the railway line leading to the next train station in Velká Kraš and took positions in a school building overlooking the line. After the train stopped before the blockage just in front of the school, Freikorps opened fire with rifles and started tossing hand grenades. The train occupants ran away from the building and train towards fields, leaving behind one dead civilian and two wounded SDG members and several wounded civilians, who were captured by Freikorps and delivered to Germany. There they were first treated and later released. The rest managed to get away and under constant covering fire reached the train station in Velká Kraš. Here, Freikorps leader Latzel first persisted that the SDG personnel must surrender. The SDG squad, now consisting of 13 seriously wounded and a few lightly wounded members, refused and stated the intent to either get further inland or die trying. Freikorps then let the seriously wounded be taken on a train with expelled ethnic Czech civilians bound for Jeseník while the few remaining SDG members left on foot through the woods to Zighartice. In Jeseník hospital, ethnic German doctors with swastika pins on their lapels refused to treat the seriously wounded SDG members, until one of the SDG members threatened to discharge hand grenades.	2 SDG members lynched; 2 civilians murdered; 15 SDG members seriously wounded; several civilians seriously wounded
Zlaté Hory	Ethnic German mob of several hundred; Several dozen Freikorps members; Two trucks with unmarked heavily armed men from Germany proper	10 Gendarme officers	Jeseník District A mob of several hundred ethnic Germans and several dozen Freikorps members, who were placing women and children in front of them, surrounded the Gendarme station in Zlaté Hory and demanded surrender of the officers. After arrival of two trucks with unmarked armed men from Germany proper, the officers surrendered and were abducted to Germany, where they were held first in prison in Glatz (now Kłodzko in Poland), later in a concentration camp in Dresden.	10 Czechoslovak state officials abducted and interned in a concentration camp in Germany

=== 23 September 1938 ===
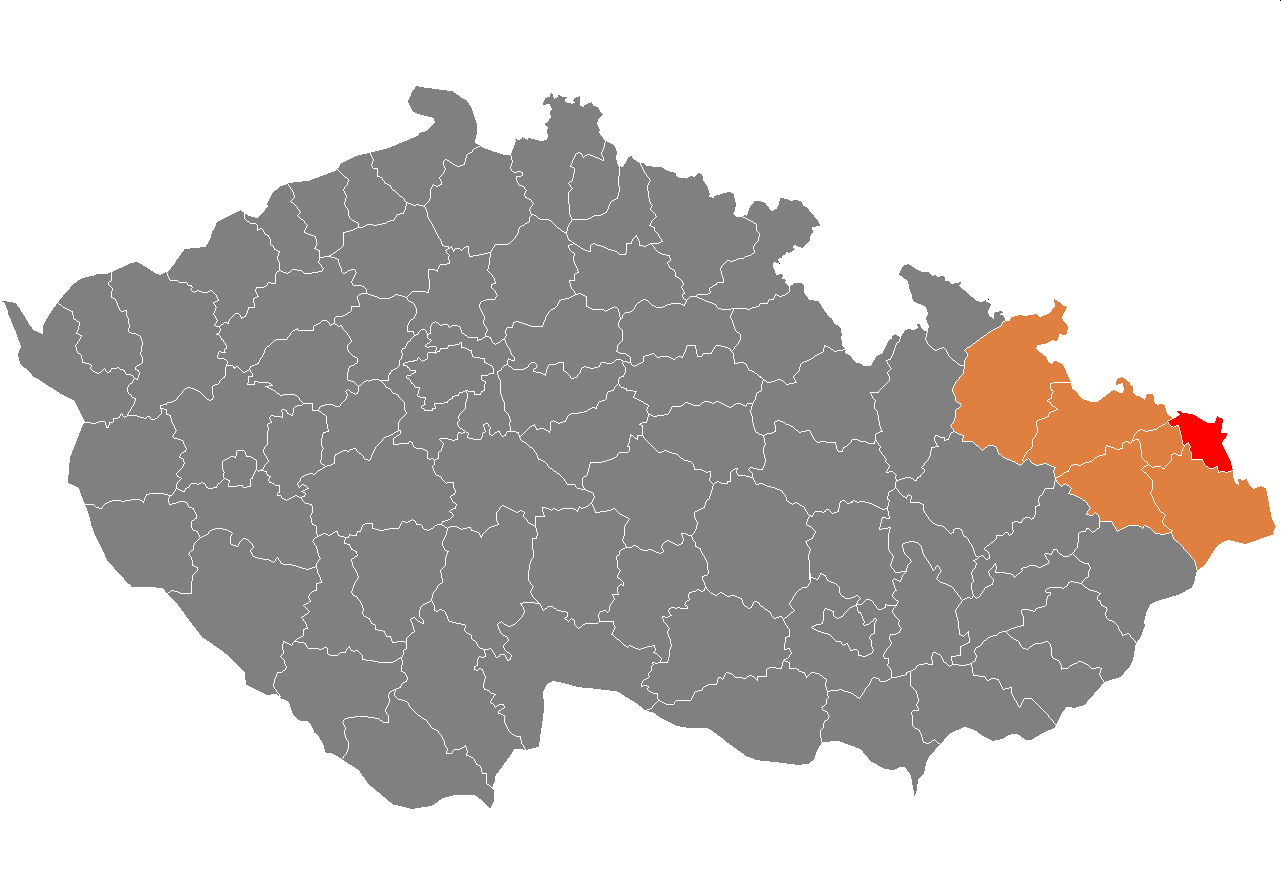
Polish offensive in Karviná District: On 23–24 September Poland gave an order to the so-called "battle units" of the "Trans-Olza Legion", made up of volunteers from all over Poland, to cross the border to Czechoslovakia and attack Czechoslovak units. This followed an official Polish request of 21 September for a direct transfer of the Trans-Olza area to its own control, and placing some 60,000 Polish soldiers along the border on 22 September. By this time, however, Czechoslovak border fortifications in the area were already manned and in full combat readiness. The Polish charge was repulsed and attacking units retreated to Poland without gaining any ground.

Hitler gave new orders under which captured Czechs were to be considered and treated as prisoners of war. Captives that could prove Slovak or Hungarian nationality were to be regarded as refugees to Germany.

By 11 am, the Czechoslovak government officially declared that it was unable to exercise Czechoslovak authority in two border districts (Osoblaha and Jindřichov). State officials from these regions were ordered to retreat towards a new line of defense manned by the army.

In other areas the Czechoslovak army started offensive actions which led to recapturing of areas in and around Varnsdorf, from which SDG squads retreated in the previous days.

At 11:30 pm, Czechoslovakia declared full army mobilization as well as full stationing of Czechoslovak border fortifications.

Place	Assailants	Assaulted	Details	Outcome
Srbská	Unknown number of Freikorps members	Customs Administration (5 officers); State Defense Guard (12 members)	Liberec District Already on 9 September, German customs house on the other side of the border had its windows facing Czechoslovakia boarded up, leaving only small slits for shooting. On 23 September 1938 at 11 pm, two ethnic Germans entered the Czechoslovak customs house in order to be cleared to pass the border to Germany. While customs officer Václav Čep was dealing with the necessary formalities, not facing the two Germans, one of them shot him from point blank into his temple. At the same moment, the other German opened fire on two customs officers present in the room, instantly killing officer Josef Vojta and mortally wounding officer Bohumil Hošek (shot in the back). As the two Germans ran across border to Germany, other assailants opened machine gun fire, forcing two remaining customs officers (not present in the room at the time of shooting) to withdraw to another building in the municipality held by SDG squad. Three SDG members were killed in the subsequent gunfight.	3 customs officers murdered; 3 SDG servicemen killed in action
Varnsdorf; Krásná Lípa	Freikorps	Czechoslovak army: 1st Battalion of 47th Infantry Regiment; Emergency platoons of 47th Infantry Regiment; Tank platoon; Armored train	Varnsdorf At 6 am, Czechoslovak units started moving forward from the border fortifications around Varnsdorf and recapturing territory from which SDG left the previous day. By 10 am the army started assault on Krásná Lípa and Varnsdorf. Both were taken by 5 pm without any soldiers lost. The Army captured a number of Freikorps members that did not manage to retreat to Germany as well as large stockpiles of arms and ammunition.	Šluknov Hook recaptured

=== 24 September 1938 ===
Freikorps leadership gave out an order that Freikorps fighting units must compel ethnic German mayors of Czechoslovak border towns to send telegraphs to the Führer asking for immediate German intervention. The order specifically mentioned that telegrams must reach Hitler before his planned meeting with Chamberlain, and at the same time they were to be sent in a manner that did not connect them back to Freikorps nor raise suspicion of concerted action.

Czechoslovak full army mobilization had a chilling effect on Freikorps membership and led to a lower number of attacks. As the Czechoslovak forces started retaking territory lost in previous days, retreating Freikorps looted public buildings and "confiscated" money and valuables from bank vaults.

The German Army (Wehrmacht) was given sole authority over German border areas with Czechoslovakia. This led to quarrels between Freikorps lower officers and Wehrmacht officers over the actual line of command. The Freikorps was ordered to conduct raids over the border only after briefing the respective local leader of the German border guard.

Place	Assailants	Assaulted	Details	Outcome
Brandov	8 Freikorps members	2 State policemen	Brandov Two state policemen on a motorbike with a sidecar were patrolling the area around local branch of Česká zbrojovka small arms maker when they were ambushed by 8 Freikorps members. Driver Václav Staňek was shot in the backbone and immobilized, while Josef Hřích remained lying on the ground. As Freikorps emerged from their cover and approached the scene, Hřích unholstered his pistol and started shooting, wounding two. Staňek later died in hospital while the Freikorps retreated over the border to Germany with their wounded. Heavy fight over the factory started few days later, see below	1 policeman killed; 2 Freikorps members wounded
Bruntál	Unknown number of Freikorps members	State Defense Guard: 10 District office clerks; 2 State Police officers; 8 Gendarme officers; 15 army soldiers; 5 army officers; 35 Gendarme cadets	Bruntál District State Defense Guard units in Bruntál and surrounding areas had been under sporadic attacks since May 1938. The frequency of assaults rose up in September and culminated between 24 and 26 September. The main attack started at noon of 24 September and continued through the night with Freikorps members shooting from buildings as well as rooftops. The next day authorities found one dead and eight severely wounded Freikorps members, as well as many others' pools of blood. The large scale battle led many civilians to leave the town while authorities declared martial law. Fight broke out also next evening and continued throughout the whole night. SDG members resorted to defending their own buildings and swept the town next morning, finding a large number of blood pools but no bodies or wounded Freikorps members. In the following nights the SDG sent most of its personnel patrolling the streets and no other fights broke out. In total, 6 SDG members were wounded. The number of Freikorps casualties remained unknown but was presumed to be as high as 80, which was the death-toll that the Freikorps sustained in a similar size assault that was taking place meanwhile in Krnov and which matched the number of large blood pools that were found in the morning following the night fights.	6 SDG members seriously wounded; dead, 8 wounded Freikorps members confirmed, up to 80 Freikorps casualties unconfirmed

=== 25 September 1938 ===
Place	Assailants	Assaulted	Details	Outcome
Libá (Aš District)	700 Freikorps members and armed civilians (mainly WW1 veterans); 160–180 SS soldiers with light cannons	State Defense Guard squad (30 members) with 2 light tanks; Several armed civilians (mainly young German Social Democratic Party members)	Municipality of Libá within the Aš District After taking control of Aš during the night of 21 to 22 September (see above), SdP started executing control over the territory of Aš District, blocking main roads from inland Czechoslovakia and pushing further inland as far as the municipality of Libá. The Freikorps push inland was stopped at a hamlet two kilometers from Libá and the line of contact stabilized at this place for a few days with sporadic exchanges of rifle fire. During the afternoon of 25 September, two light tanks of the SDG squad drove forward in order to test the enemy's strength. An exchange of fire ensued and the light tanks started retreating. Germans on foot engaged the tanks with machine gun fire and hand grenades, to no effect. As the tanks retreated back to the hamlet, Germans took cover in haystacks in its vicinity. The armoured vehicles received anti-tank fire from the German side of the border. Severe exchange of gunfire continued until the haystacks were set on fire and Germans forced to retreat. The intensity of the skirmish led to panic in SdP ranks which requested reinforcements from Germany: SdP reported that they had only 700 armed men (Freikorps sent from Germany and civilians, mainly members of a WW1 veterans' association) at their disposal and that they would not be able to hold in case of counterattack. Two SS companies were sent from Germany and replaced Freikorps at the point of contact. The line remained stable with continuous exchanges of rifle and machine gun fire until the evening of 28 September when SDG squad was ordered to retreat. The hamlet was taken over by SS on 29 September. The hamlet was severally damaged in the fighting and immediately used by German propaganda as an example of "Czech terror against German civilians".	Several wounded SDG members; Several German casualties

=== 26 September 1938 ===
Adolf Hitler ordered Freikorps to conduct more assaults. The number of assaults became higher than in previous days, but did no reach the intensity of 21–22 September.

Place	Assailants	Assaulted	Details	Outcome
Javorník (Jeseník District)	SS; Freikorps	SDG	Jeseník District Numerous SS and Freikorps crossed border into the town of Javorník and its vicinity. SDG units present retreated inland towards border fortification line without fighting.	Javorník area under German control.

=== 27 September 1938 ===
Place	Assailants	Assaulted	Details	Outcome
Brandov	200 Freikorps members	SDG	Brandov 200 well-armed Freikorps members crossed the border into Brandov and assaulted the local SDG unit. SDG briefly retreated, however after receiving reinforcements pushed the Freikorps out of the town. The Freikorps recaptured the entire town as well as local small arms factory the next day, only to be pushed back again by SDG on 29 September.	8 soldiers seriously wounded, 1 captured and beaten to death by Freikorps (private Michal Vimi, 2nd Unit of 1st Battalion of 28th Regiment); 15 dead and 25 wounded Freikorps members
Rychnůvka	Unknown number of Freikorps members	SDG squad	Český Krumlov District Freikorps attempted to seize the town, starting assault during midnight change of SDG shifts. Heavy exchange of rifle and machinegun fire and much use of grenades by both sides. Freikorps retreated to Germany before morning, leaving behind several pools of blood.	Several wounded SDG members; Several wounded or dead Freikorps members

=== 28 September 1938 ===
Place	Assailants	Assaulted	Details	Outcome
Horní Lomany (now part of Františkovy Lázně)	Unknown number of Freikorps members	Customs patrol; SDG squad	Františkovy Lázně The line of contact at the area had been stable for several days with Freikorps controlling municipality of Házlov by the German border and Czechoslovak authorities controlling municipality of Horní Lomany lying between Házlov and first major Czechoslovak town, Františkovy lázně. On 28 September at 2 am, a motorbike with two men drove towards Czechoslovak fortified checkpoint by the railway tracks near Horní Lomany. The men were shouting in broken Czech: "Don't shoot, we are German Social Democrats, we are your friends." Customs officer Rudolf Josiek left the barricade to talk to them, was ambushed and shot dead. Both perpetrators, Freikorps members, managed to escape. The same day in the evening, Freikorps opened fire from Házlov towards a position of SDG in Horní Lomany. SDG squad carried out assault against the enemy in an infantry fighting vehicle, killing two Freikorps members before retreating back to original position.	1 Customs officer ambushed and killed; 2 Freikorps members killed
Lísková			Monument in Dolní Podluží commemorating Josef Röhrich, member of the Czechoslovak Customs Administration, killed by the Germans on 28 September 1938 (Plzeň Region, Czech Republic). Memorial to Josef Röhrich	1 customs officer killed
Načetín (Kalek)	60 Freikorps members	3 SDG members	Chomutov District SDG patrol consisting of two customs officers (Dostál, Trojan) and one soldier (private Novák) was attacked by a large group of Freikorps. SDG, armed with rifles and one light machinegun, defended their position and seriously wounded 14 Freikorps members; two of them later died. By the time 7 other members of SDG came to relieve them, Freikorps were already retreating with their wounded.	12 Freikorps wounded, 2 dead

=== 29 September 1938 ===
Place	Assailants	Assaulted	Details	Outcome
Pohraničí (Reizenhain)	Large number of Freikorps	SDG Squad (23 members)	Chomutov District SDG Squad (armed with rifles, hand grenades, and one light machine gun) established a defensive post in the woods next to the municipal graveyard and sent 4 members to patrol near a train stop by the border. Shortly after midnight, several dozen members of Freikorps attacked the patrol by the train stop. The patrol was relieved by the rest of the SDG and pushed the Freikorps behind the border, only to face even more of them shortly afterward. Facing heavy machine gun fire and being several times outnumbered, SDG retreated further inland without losses. The next day SDG recaptured the area with help of army reinforcements that included three tanks.	Several wounded Freikorps members
Načetín (Kalek)	Freikorps	3 SDG members	Chomutov District Undeterred by the losses of previous day (see above), Freikorps again attacked SDG patrol. This time, Freikorps were also armed with machine guns. The patrol held their ground until the arrival of an infantry fighting vehicle, which forced the Freikorps to retreat.	Freikorps pushed back

=== 30 September 1938 ===
Following the signing of the Munich Agreement, Freikorps leadership gave orders to cease cross-border assaults. At the same time, Hitler decided that Freikorps would be subordinate to SS command, and not to Wehrmacht as were his previous orders. Freikorps were supposed to conduct police powers within the territory of occupied Czechoslovakia.

According to a final report of Friedrich Köchling, officially the Wehrmacht's liaison officer to Freikorps but its de facto leader up to 4 October 1938, Freikorps had killed 110 people, wounded 50 and kidnapped 2,029 to Germany. The report lists 164 successful and 75 unsuccessful operations that lead to 52 fatalities, 65 seriously wounded and 19 lost members of Freikorps.

From 7 October 1938, Freikorps were headquartered in a former Czechoslovak Bank building in Cheb. On 10 October 1938 Freikorps was officially disbanded.

As Freikorps operations involved a large scale looting and "borrowing" in its area of operation, aggrieved parties were given up to 15 November 1938 to request damages from newly established German authorities in the occupied area. Court cases dealing with these claims were running as far as 1942.

== Criminal liability ==
=== Germany ===
Being aware that Freikorps actions involved a large-scale criminal activity, Adolf Hitler issued a decree on 7 June 1939, according to which all of the actions that were criminal under Czech law would be considered lawful under German law, and those that were criminal under German law were pardoned.

=== Czechoslovakia ===
A majority of Freikorps members were formally Czechoslovak army deserters (especially after the full army mobilization order of 23 September) and their mere membership in Freikorps was punishable by life imprisonment under Czechoslovak act No. 50/1923, on the protection of the Republic. Meanwhile, their active participation in crossborder raids which included murders, attempted murders and kidnapping was punishable by death under the 1852 Criminal Code.

The vast majority of the perpetrators who survived the war avoided justice through the postwar expulsion of Germans from Czechoslovakia.

Individual cases were decided by a Special Tribunal set up in the city of Cheb. The Tribunal decided 62 cases, last on 29 October 1948. 10 Freikorps members were sentenced to death (of which sentences 6 were carried out), 16 to life imprisonment, 5 to 30 years' imprisonment, 10 to 25 years' imprisonment and 16 to 20 years' imprisonment. The majority had however already been released and expelled to Germany in 1955, which was the year in which Czechoslovakia officially declared the end of the war with Germany that started on 17 September 1938 with first Freikorps crossborder operations.

== Brandenburg Division ==
Based on the successful utilization of the Freikorps' tactics against Czechoslovakia and in psychological warfare against Czechoslovak allies, the Abwehr later in September 1939 established the so-called "1st Construction Training Company for special purposes" (1. Baulehr-Kompanie Brandeburg z.b.V.) that had former Freikorps members as their core. This later rose to the size of division. The division was known for large scale use of tactics that involved its soldiers wearing enemy uniforms, conducting saboteur actions behind enemy lines and many war crimes.
