= Liptaň =

- Municipality
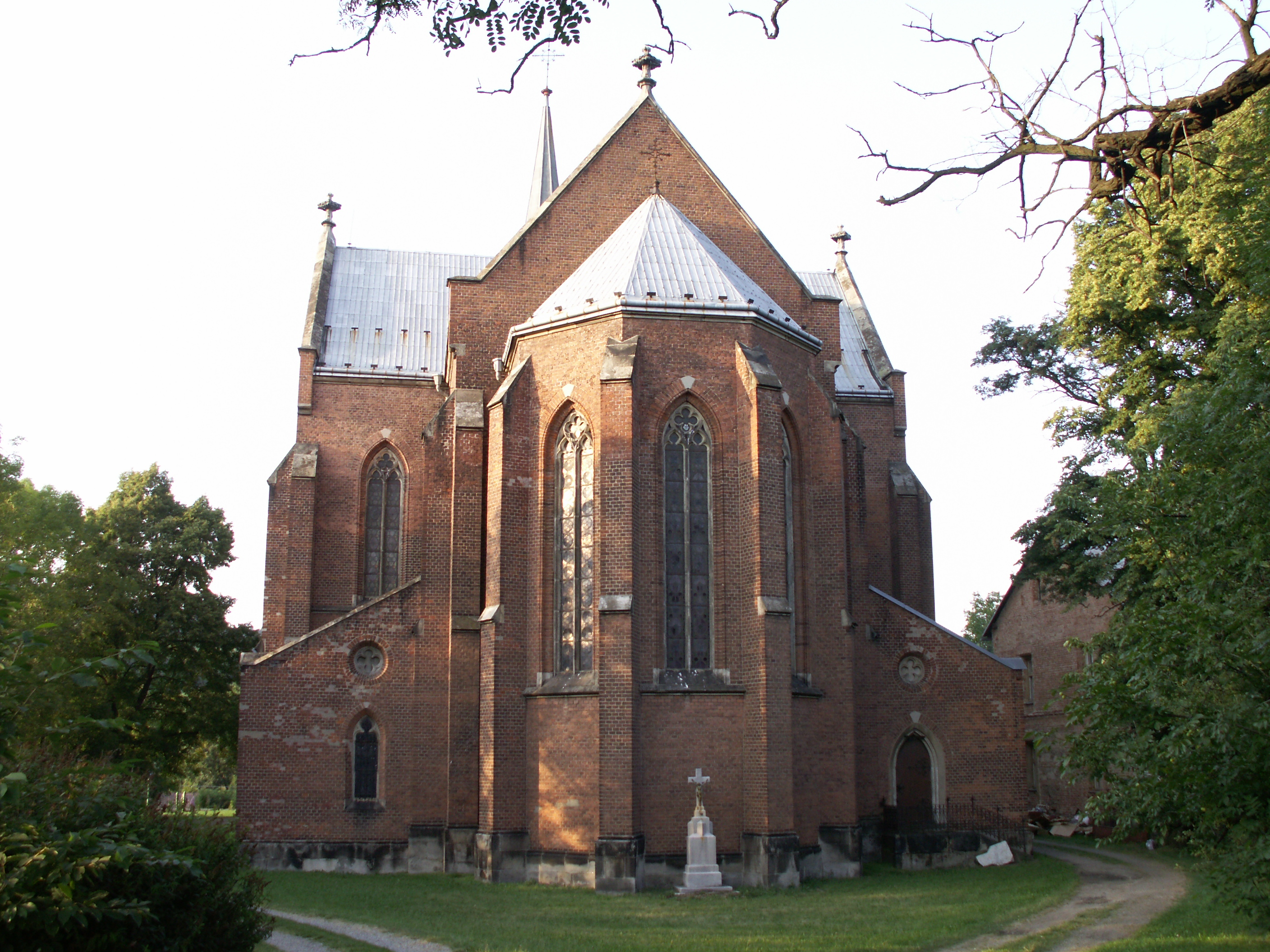
- Church of the Assumption of the Virgin Mary

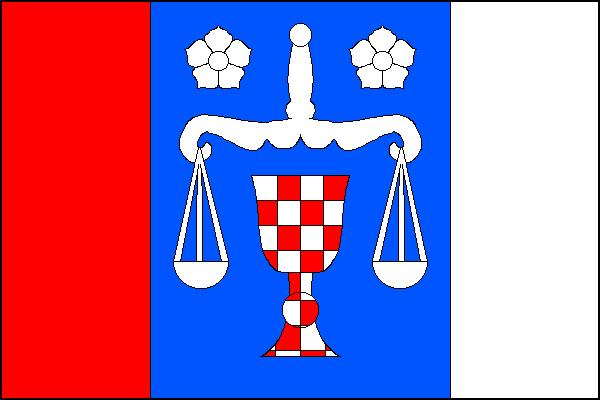
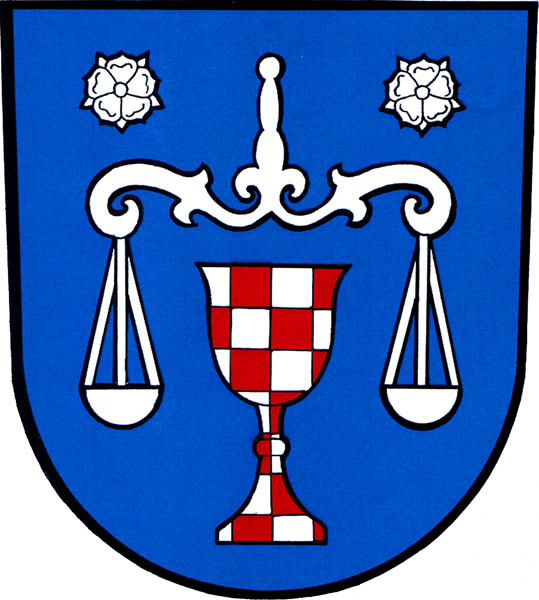
- Flag Coat of arms

- Location in the Czech Republic
- Coordinates: 50°13′20″N 17°36′20″E
- Country: Czech Republic
- Region: Moravian-Silesian
- District: Bruntál
- First mentioned: 1256

Area
  - Total: 20.28 km^{2} (7.83 sq mi)
- Elevation: 295 m (968 ft)

Population (2026-01-01)
  - Total: 465
  - Density: 22.9/km^{2} (59.4/sq mi)
- Time zone: UTC+1 (CET)
  - Summer (DST): UTC+2 (CEST)
- Postal code: 793 99
- Website: www.liptan.cz

Liptaň (German: Liebenthal) is a municipality and village in Bruntál District in the Moravian-Silesian Region of the Czech Republic. It has about 500 inhabitants.

== Administrative division ==
Liptaň consists of three municipal parts (in brackets population according to the 2021 census):

- Liptaň (342)
- Bučávka (49)
- Horní Povelice (35)

== Geography ==
Liptaň is located about 28 kilometres (17 mi) north of Bruntál and 62 km (39 mi) northwest of Ostrava. It is situated in the Osoblažsko microregion. It lies in the Zlatohorská Highlands. The highest point is the hill Kobyla at 574 m (1,883 ft) above sea level, located on the southern municipal border.

South of the village of Liptaň is situated the Liptaňský bludný balvan Nature Monument with one of the largest glacial erratics in the Czech Republic. Reminding of the period 250–800 thousand years ago, the boulder was carried there by a continental glacier from the south of Sweden. Its weight is about 4.7 tonnes.

== History ==
The first written mention of Liptaň is from 1256. It was founded around 1240. For most of its history, it was a fief of the Olomouc bishopric or it was administered directly by the Olomouc bishops.

The event known as the Liptaň Tragedy happened on 22 September 1938. Radicalised German villagers attacked the gendarmerie station and disarmed and assassinated all six Czech members of the State Defense Guard. The gendarme officers' bodies were transported over the border to the German town of Leobschütz (now Głubczyce, Poland) where they were buried in an unmarked mass grave.

== Demographics ==
Historical population

Year	Pop.	±%
1869	2,611	—
1880	2,737	+4.8%
1890	2,447	−10.6%
1900	2,391	−2.3%
1910	2,101	−12.1%

Year	Pop.	±%
1921	1,898	−9.7%
1930	1,781	−6.2%
1950	915	−48.6%
1961	869	−5.0%
1970	687	−20.9%

Year	Pop.	±%
1980	564	−17.9%
1991	477	−15.4%
2001	445	−6.7%
2011	434	−2.5%
2021	426	−1.8%

Source: Censuses

== Transport ==
Liptaň is located on the narrow-gauge Třemešná ve Slezsku–Osoblaha railway.

== Sport ==
On the Strážný vrch hill there is a 250 metres (820 ft) long ski lift.

== Sights ==
The main landmark of Liptaň is the Church of the Assumption of the Virgin Mary. The original church was as old as the village. The current building was built of red bricks in the Neo-Gothic style in 1866–1870.

Other historical monuments include the Chapel of Our Lady of Help, the house No. 240 with a chapel, and the former police station in the house No. 261 where the Liptaň Tragedy took place. There is a memorial plaque commemorating this event.

On the top of the hill Strážnice is a wooden observation tower. It was built in 2003 and it is 9 metres (30 ft) high.

The narrow-gauge railway serves not only for transport but also as a tourist attraction. Steam trains run on weekends during the tourist season.
