= Aschberg =

Mountain on the Germany–Czech Republic border

Aschberg / Kamenáč
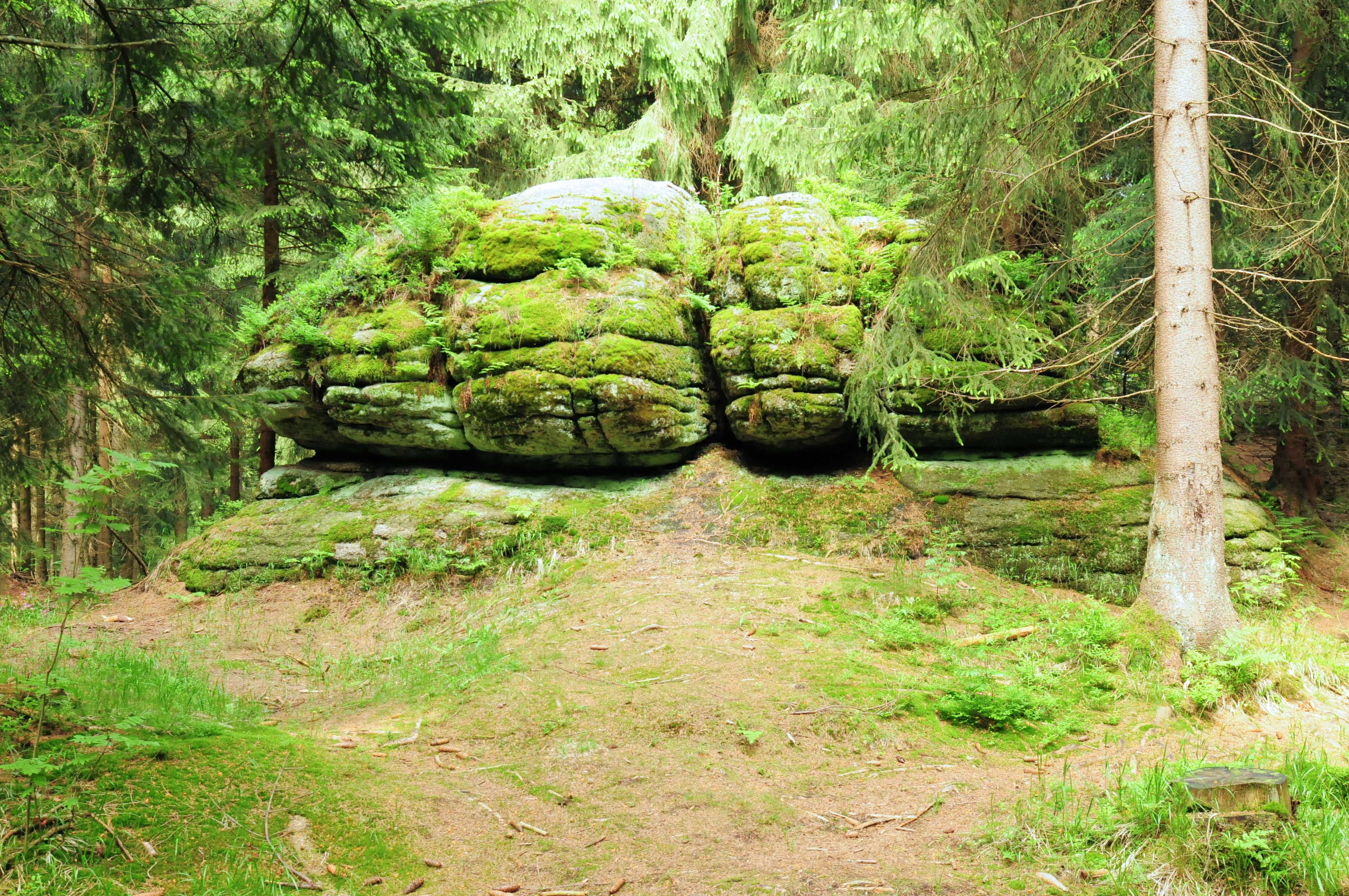
- Group of rocks on the summit

Highest point
- Elevation: 936 m (3,071 ft)

Geography
- Location: Bublava, Czech Republic; Klingenthal, Germany

The Aschberg (Czech: Kamenáč; German: Aschberg) is a mountain on the border of Germany (Saxony) and the Czech Republic. It is part of the Ore Mountains. The summit lies on the Czech side, in the municipality of Bublava.

== Location and region ==
Near the summit there is an observation tower on the German side and a youth hostel next to it. The summit plateau is populated on the Saxon side. The scattered houses, originally mountain farmhouses, are known as the Aschbergsiedlung ("Aschberg settlement").

There is a transmission mast on the mountain that transmits at the following frequencies:

- VHF 93.7 MHz (MDR 1 Radio Sachsen) - Power: 0.2 kW
- VHF 98.4 MHz (MDR Kultur) - Power: 0.2 kW
- VHF 103.5 MHz (Vogtland Radio) - Power: 0.05 kW

The summit lies on the Czech side of the border and consists of a small rock outcrop supporting a square-section granite column of the Royal Saxon Survey. It is a level 1 station and bears the number 24. It only has historical significance. Not far from the peak there are other outcrops formed by woolsack weathering, the most famous of which is the group of rocks called Tři skalky; the name means "three rocks".

The view over Bublava and Klingenthal into the Elster Mountains opens up a distant view over the Bohemian and Saxon highlands towards the Slavkov Forest, the Kapellenberg and the heights of the northern Upper Palatinate Forest. A vantage point on the border trail below the youth hostel was given the name Paul-Apitzsch-Blick, where a bench named after this local historian 50.38624°N 12.50214°E commemorates him and is one of the most important viewing points over the Saxon Vogtland.

There is a ski slope on the mountain and the Kammloipe cross country skiing trail, which runs from Mühlleithen to Schöneck or Carlsfeld to Johanngeorgenstadt.

== History ==
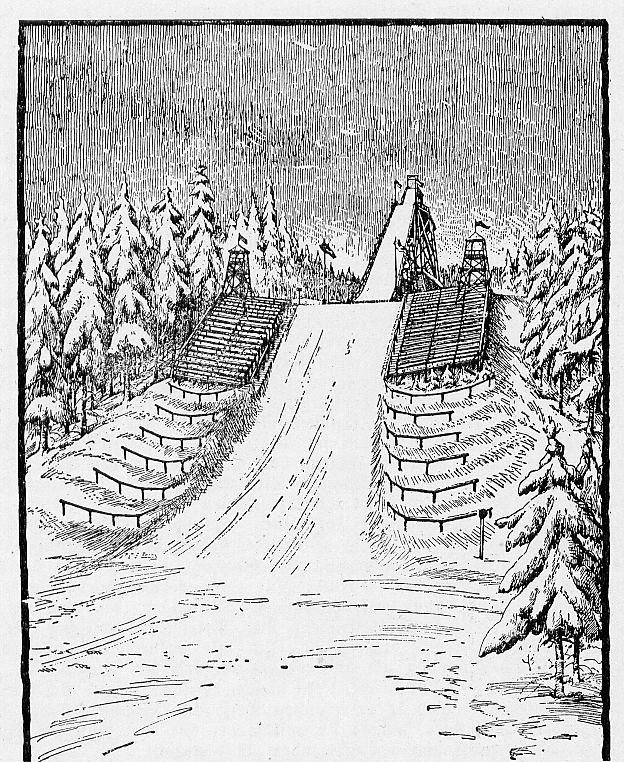
The ski jump around 1925

Along with miners and hammersmiths, glassmakers also came to the western Ore Mountains to process the quartz found in several veins on this mountain, as well as other places. The vast forests, which had never been exploited before, provided sufficient wood for the smelting furnaces and for "liming", the extraction of potash from charcoal.

The mountain was also populated on the Czech side. With the expulsion of the German population after the Second World War, the buildings south of the summit were dismantled.

On the northern slopes there was a ski jump, the Curt A. Seydel Schanze, which was in use from 1923 to 1940.
