= Bublava =

- Municipality
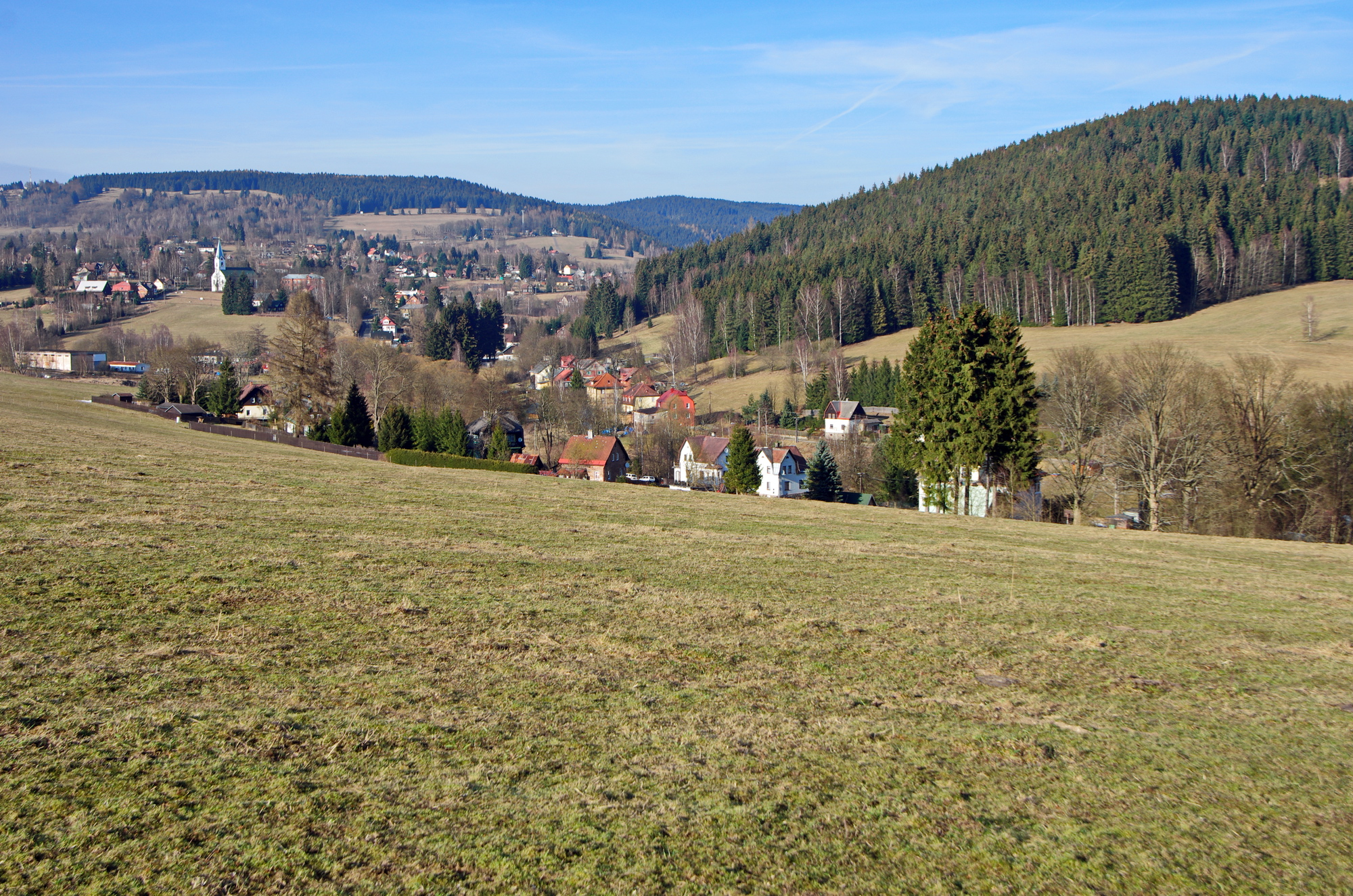
- View from the south

- Flag Coat of arms

- Location in the Czech Republic
- Coordinates: 50°22′28″N 12°30′19″E
- Country: Czech Republic
- Region: Karlovy Vary
- District: Sokolov
- First mentioned: 1601

Area
  - Total: 6.15 km^{2} (2.37 sq mi)
- Elevation: 735 m (2,411 ft)

Population (2026-01-01)
  - Total: 409
  - Density: 66.5/km^{2} (172/sq mi)
- Time zone: UTC+1 (CET)
  - Summer (DST): UTC+2 (CEST)
- Postal code: 357 22
- Website: obecbublava.cz

Bublava (until 1947 Schwaderbach) is a municipality and village in Sokolov District in the Karlovy Vary Region of the Czech Republic. It has about 400 inhabitants.

== Etymology ==
Until 1947, the municipality and the village used the German name Schwaderbach (initially Schwederbach), meaning 'talking stream'. In 1947, they were was renamed to its current name. The name Bublava translates as 'bubbling stream'.

== Geography ==
Bublava is located about 24 kilometres (15 mi) north of Sokolov and 29 km (18 mi) northwest of Karlovy Vary. It lies on the border with Germany, adjacent to the German town of Klingenthal. It lies in the western part of the Ore Mountains. The stream Bublavský potok flows through the municipality. The highest point is the mountain Kamenáč at 936 m (3,071 ft) above sea level. A dominant feature is also the mountain Olověný vrch at 802 m (2,631 ft).

== History ==
The first written mention of Bublava is from 1601.

== Demographics ==
Historical population

Year	Pop.	±%
1869	2,410	—
1880	2,692	+11.7%
1890	3,194	+18.6%
1900	3,447	+7.9%
1910	3,914	+13.5%

Year	Pop.	±%
1921	3,695	−5.6%
1930	4,106	+11.1%
1950	675	−83.6%
1961	668	−1.0%
1970	533	−20.2%

Year	Pop.	±%
1980	363	−31.9%
1991	260	−28.4%
2001	336	+29.2%
2011	344	+2.4%
2021	362	+5.2%

Source: Censuses

== Transport ==
on the border with Germany is the road border crossing Bublava / Aschberg/Klingenthal.

== Sport ==
From the early 20th century, Bublava is known as a winter sports resort.

== Sights ==
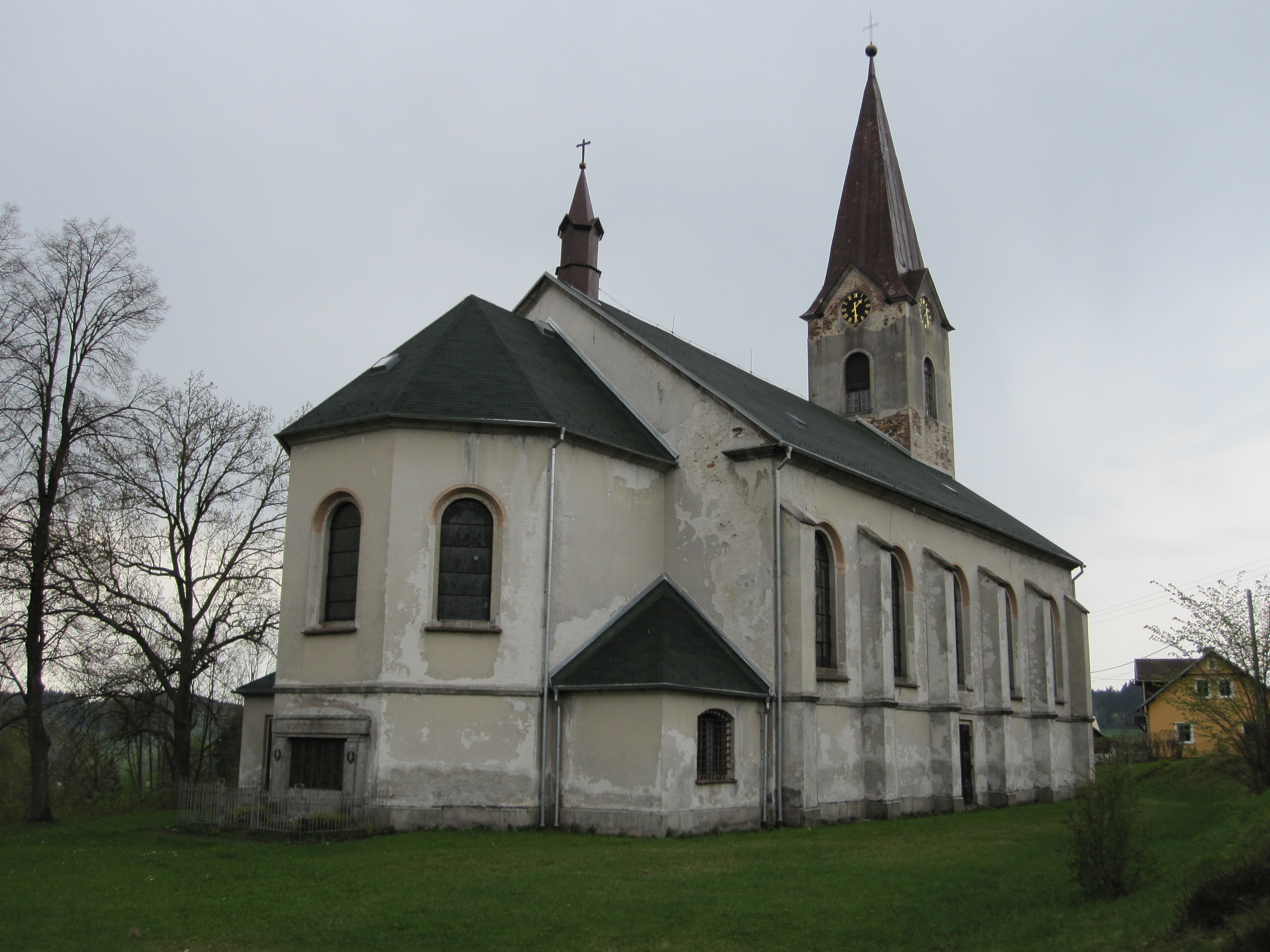
Church of the Assumption of the Virgin Mary

The main landmark of Bublava is the Church of the Assumption of the Virgin Mary. It was consecrated in 1883.

On the hill Olověný vrch is the Bleiberg observation tower. It was built in 1933. The historical building was closed in 2017 and its repair is planned.
