= Hnanice =

- Municipality
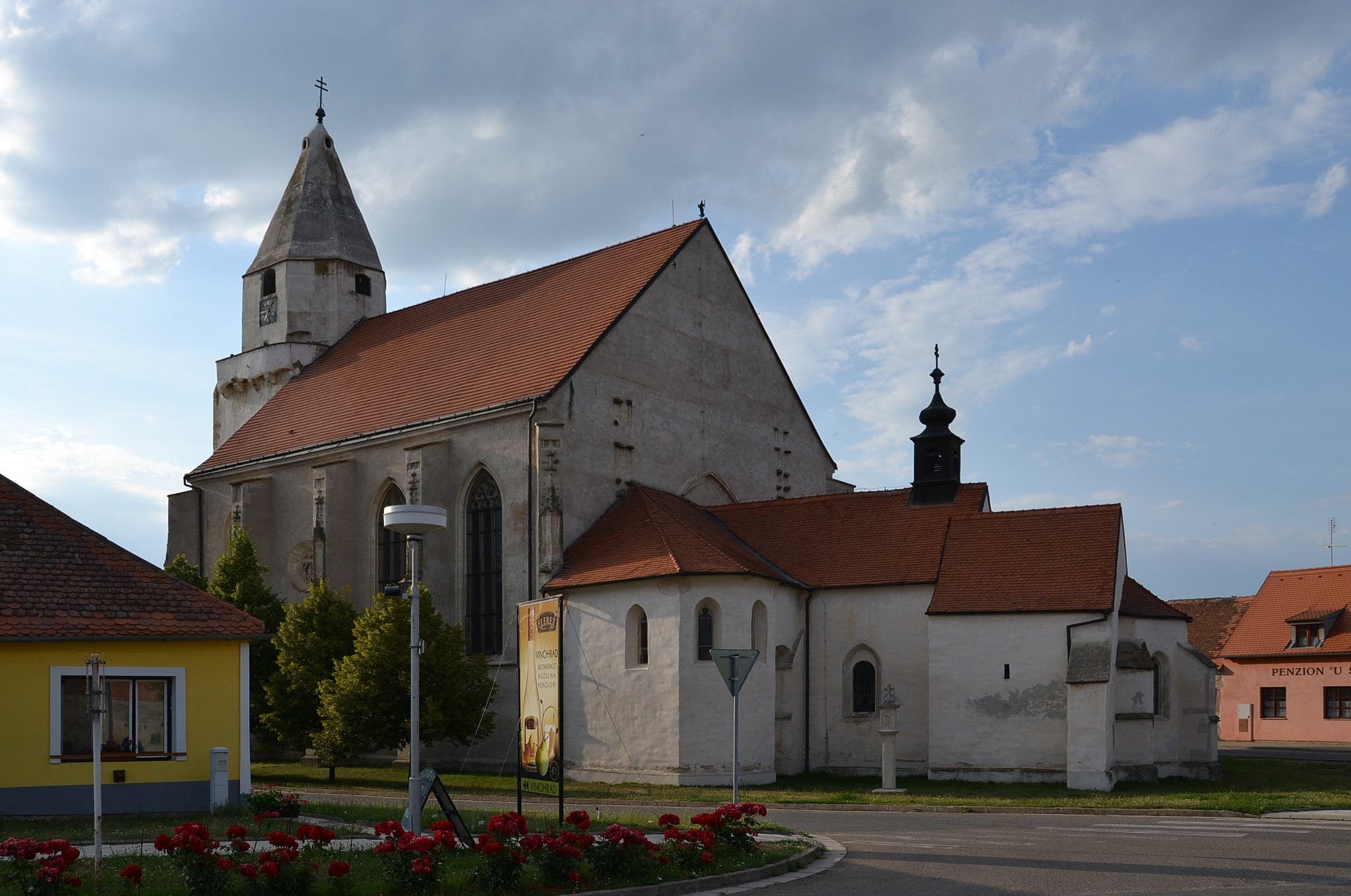
- Church of Saint Wolfgang

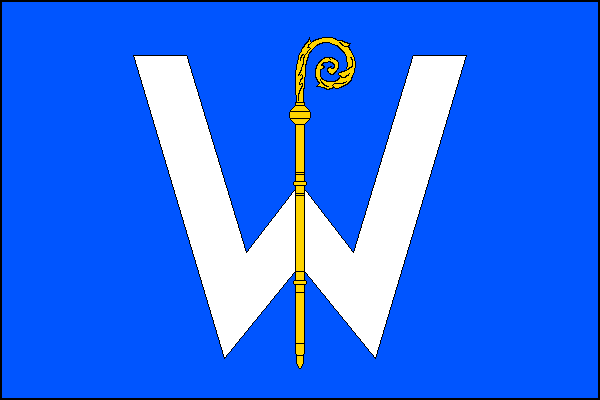
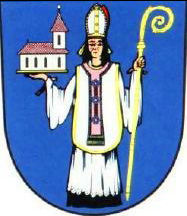
- Flag Coat of arms

- Location in the Czech Republic
- Coordinates: 48°47′55″N 15°59′12″E
- Country: Czech Republic
- Region: South Moravian
- District: Znojmo
- First mentioned: 1201

Area
  - Total: 7.77 km^{2} (3.00 sq mi)
- Elevation: 268 m (879 ft)

Population (2026-01-01)
  - Total: 355
  - Density: 45.7/km^{2} (118/sq mi)
- Time zone: UTC+1 (CET)
  - Summer (DST): UTC+2 (CEST)
- Postal code: 669 02
- Website: www.obechnanice.cz

Hnanice (German: Gnadlersdorf) is a municipality and village in Znojmo District in the South Moravian Region of the Czech Republic. It has about 400 inhabitants.

Hnanice lies approximately 8 kilometres (5 mi) south-west of Znojmo, 65 km (40 mi) south-west of Brno, and 182 km (113 mi) south-east of Prague.

== Demographics ==
Historical population
Year	Pop.	±%
1869	624	—
1880	629	+0.8%
1890	613	−2.5%
1900	595	−2.9%
1910	587	−1.3%
1921	584	−0.5%
1930	565	−3.3%
1950	353	−37.5%
1961	293	−17.0%
1970	264	−9.9%
1980	235	−11.0%
1991	219	−6.8%
2001	290	+32.4%
2011	316	+9.0%
2021	330	+4.4%
Source: Censuses
